= 1832 in India =

- Centuries: 17th; 18th; 19th; 20th; 21st
- Decades: 1810s; 1820s; 1830s; 1840s; 1850s
- See also: List of years in India; Timeline of Indian history

Events in the year 1832 in India.

== Incumbents ==
- Governor-General of India: Lord William Bentinck

== Events ==
- The Bank of Hindostan was liquidated.
- The Kol uprising began.
- The Guntur famine of 1832 affected Guntur, Madras Presidency.
- The Bombay Dog Riots occurred, sparked by an attempt by municipal colonial authorities to exterminate the city's stray dogs, which was opposed by Bombay's Parsis due to dogs being considered sacred in Zoroastrianism.
