= 1831 in India =

- Centuries: 17th; 18th; 19th; 20th; 21st
- Decades: 1810s; 1820s; 1830s; 1840s; 1850s
- See also: List of years in India; Timeline of Indian history

Events in the year 1831 in India.

== Incumbents ==
- Governor-General of India: Lord William Bentinck

== Events ==
- 6 May: The Battle of Balakot took place which saw the Sikh forces under prince Sher Singh defeat the Mujahideenunder Syed Ahmad Barelvi at Balakot.
- 9 October: The Nagar revolt which began in 1830, ended when the British East India Company took over.
- October: The Ropar Meeting took place.
