= 1825 in India =

- Centuries: 17th; 18th; 19th; 20th; 21st
- Decades: 1800s; 1810s; 1820s; 1830s; 1840s
- See also: List of years in India; Timeline of Indian history

Events in the year 1825 in India.

== Incumbents ==
- Governor-General of India: William Amherst, 1st Earl Amherst

== Events ==
- 9 December: The Siege of Bharatpur begins.
- The Jardine, Skinner and Company is established in Bombay.

== Births ==
- September 4 – Dadabhai Naoroji, politician.
