= 1613 in India =

- Centuries: 16th; 17th; 18th; 19th
- Decades: 1590s; 1600s; 1610s; 1620s; 1630s
- See also: List of years in India; Timeline of Indian history

Events in the year 1613 in India.

== Incumbents ==
- Basu Dev, Raja of Nurpur State, 1580–1613
- Suraj Mal, Raja of Nurpur State, 1613–1618

== Events ==
- Construction of the Tomb of Akbar the Great was completed
- Construction of Bhangarh Fort in Rajasthan was completed
- Jhansi Fort was built by Raja Vir Singh Deo of Orchha; construction work continued till 1618.
- British forces established a factory (trading post) at Surat
- Dutch forces established a factory (trading post) at Palakollu
- Poet Ganesa, son of Gopal Das, wrote Jatakalankara, a brief Sanskrit treatise comprising one hundred twenty-five slokas on predictive Hindu astrology
- St. Michael's Church, Anjuna was constructed in Anjuna, Goa
- Defense works at the city of Chaul were expanded

== Births ==
- Amar Singh Rathore, a Rajput nobleman affiliated with the royal house of Marwar, and a courtier of the Mughal emperor Shah Jahan, on 11 December
- Kavi Bhushan, poet in the courts of the Bundeli king Chhatrasal and the Maratha king Shivaji
