= 1632 in India =

- Centuries: 16th; 17th; 18th; 19th
- Decades: 1610s; 1620s; 1630s; 1640s; 1650s
- See also: List of years in India; Timeline of Indian history

Events in the year 1632 in India.

== Events ==
- June 17 – Shah Jahan's beloved wife Mumtaz Mahal dies, after giving birth to their 14th child. Soon after, construction of the Taj Mahal, begins.
- Date Unknown - The Portuguese are driven out of Bengal.
