= 1814 in India =

- Centuries: 17th; 18th; 19th; 20th; 21st
- Decades: 1790s; 1800s; 1810s; 1820s; 1830s
- See also: List of years in India; Timeline of Indian history

Events in the year 1814 in India.

== Events ==
- National income - ₹13,556 million
- The Anglo-Nepalese War (also known as the Nepal War or the Gorkha War) began.
