= 1755 in India =

- Centuries: 16th; 17th; 18th; 19th; 20th
- Decades: 1730s; 1740s; 1750s; 1760s; 1770s
- See also: List of years in India; Timeline of Indian history

Events in the year 1755 in India.

== Deaths ==
14 February – Raghoji I Bhonsle, Maratha King of Nagpur

== Events ==
- National income - ₹9,140 million
- The Nizam of Hyderabad (virtually independent of the Moghuls since 1748) cedes the Circars to the French.
