= 1811 in India =

- Centuries: 17th; 18th; 19th; 20th; 21st
- Decades: 1790s; 1800s; 1810s; 1820s; 1830s
- See also: List of years in India; Timeline of Indian history

Events in the year 1811 in India.

== Events ==
- National income - ₹13,863 million

== Law ==
- East India Company Bonds Act (British statute)

== Births ==
- Daya Shankar Kaul Nasim, poet (died 1845).
