= 1721 in India =

- Centuries: 16th; 17th; 18th; 19th; 20th
- Decades: 1700s; 1710s; 1720s; 1730s; 1740s
- See also: List of years in India; Timeline of Indian history

Events in the year 1721 in India.

== Events ==
- National income - ₹8,303 million
- April – October, the Attingal Outbreak took place
- 13 and 14 November, the 1721 Madras cyclone struck Madras (now Chennai)
- Nazarbaug Palace, a Gaekwad palace built in Vadodara, Gujarat state
- December - Cricket was first played in India for Recreational purpose by English sailors in Cambay (now Khambhat), Gujarat.
