= 1801 in India =

- Centuries: 17th; 18th; 19th; 20th; 21st
- Decades: 1780s; 1790s; 1800s; 1810s; 1820s
- See also: List of years in India; Timeline of Indian history

Events in the year 1801 in India.

== Incumbents ==
- Shah Alam II and the Nawab of Oudh, Mughal Emperor, reigned 10 December 1759 – 19 November 1806
- James Henry Craig, Commander-in-Chief of India, February 1801 – March 1801
- General Gerard Lake, 1st Viscount Lake, Commander-in-Chief of India, March 1801 – July 1805

== Events ==
- National income - ₹11,209 million
- Annexation of Allahabad by the British.
- Shezada Hyder Ali, grandson of Hyder Ali, joined the Maratha
- Maharaja Ranjit Singh created an imperial power
