= 1668 in India =

- Centuries: 15th; 16th; 17th; 18th; 19th
- Decades: 1640s; 1650s; 1660s; 1670s; 1680s
- See also: List of years in India; Timeline of Indian history

Events in the year 1668 in India.

== Events ==
- 27 July – Bombay is granted to the East India Company.
- 1 September - The ship 'Constantinople Merchant' reaches the coast of Surat with a royal charter granting the Port and Island of Bombay to the English East India Company.
