= 1833 in India =

- Centuries: 17th; 18th; 19th; 20th; 21st
- Decades: 1810s; 1820s; 1830s; 1840s; 1850s
- See also: List of years in India; Timeline of Indian history

Events in the year 1833 in India.

== Incumbents ==
- Governor-General of India: Lord William Bentinck

== Events ==
- 26 August – 1833 Bihar–Nepal earthquake
- The Guntur famine of 1832 continues to affect communities in Guntur, Madras Presidency.
- The Bhumij Revolt, led by Ganga Narayan Singh continues.
- The Kol uprising ends.
- The Asiatic Society of Mumbai Town Hall is completed.
