= 1804 in India =

- Centuries: 17th; 18th; 19th; 20th; 21st
- Decades: 1780s; 1790s; 1800s; 1810s; 1820s
- See also: List of years in India; Timeline of Indian history

Events in the year 1804 in India.

== Events ==
- National income - ₹11,422 million
- The Nizam of Hyderabad acquires Berar from the Marathas.
- Delhi becomes a British possession though the King of Delhi remains in the city till 1857.
