= 1769 in India =

- Centuries: 16th; 17th; 18th; 19th; 20th
- Decades: 1740s; 1750s; 1760s; 1770s; 1780s
- See also: List of years in India; Timeline of Indian history

Events in the year 1769 in India.

== Events ==
- National income - ₹9,897 million
- 1st Mysore War, 1767–69.
