= 1629 in India =

- Centuries: 15th; 16th; 17th; 18th; 19th
- Decades: 1600s; 1610s; 1620s; 1630s; 1640s
- See also: List of years in India; Timeline of Indian history

Events in the year 1629 in India.

== Events ==
- Death of Jehangir and accession to the Mughal throne of Shah Jahan (born 1592, deposed 1658, died 1666)
