= 1748 in India =

- Centuries: 16th; 17th; 18th; 19th; 20th
- Decades: 1720s; 1730s; 1740s; 1750s; 1760s
- See also: List of years in India; Timeline of Indian history

Events in the year 1748 in India.

== Events ==
- National income - ₹9,205 million
- Madras restored to the British by the French who captured the city in 1746.
