= 1615 in India =

- Centuries: 16th; 17th; 18th; 19th
- Decades: 1590s; 1600s; 1610s; 1620s; 1630s
- See also: List of years in India; Timeline of Indian history

An incomplete list of events in India in 1615:

== Events ==
Thomas Roe came to Mughal India as ambassador from James I of United Kingdom.
