= 1659 in India =

- Centuries: 15th; 16th; 17th; 18th; 19th
- Decades: 1630s; 1640s; 1650s; 1660s; 1670s
- See also: List of years in India; Timeline of Indian history

Events in the year 1659 in India.

== Events ==
- The reign of Aurungzebe begins (reigned till 1707).
