= 1663 in India =

- Centuries: 15th; 16th; 17th; 18th; 19th
- Decades: 1640s; 1650s; 1660s; 1670s; 1680s
- See also: List of years in India; Timeline of Indian history

Events in the year 1663 in India.

== Events ==
- January 23 – The Treaty of Ghilajharighat is signed in India between representatives of the Mughal Empire and the independent Ahom Kingdom (in what is now the Assam state), with the Mughals ending their occupation of the Ahom capital of Garhgaon, in return for payment by Ahom in silver and gold for costs of the occupation, and King Sutamla of Ahom sending one of his daughters to be part of the harem of Mughal Emperor Aurangzeb.
- March 4 – The Prince Edward Islands in the sub-antarctic Indian Ocean are discovered by Barent Barentszoon Lam, of the Dutch ship Maerseveen, and named Dina (Prince Edward) and Maerseveen (Marion).
- Rise of the Travancore Kingdom - The first maharaja of the Travancore Kingdom, His Highness Rama Varma I was sworned in.

== Deaths ==
- Bihari Lal, poet (b.1595).

== Sources ==
- Mumtaza, I S (1994). "Mir Jumla's Assam Invasion as depicted in the Buranjis". Proceedings of the Indian History Congress. 55: 368–374. JSTOR 44143375.
- Sarkar, J. N. (1992), "Chapter VIII Assam-Mughal Relations", in Barpujari, H. K. (ed.), The Comprehensive History of Assam, vol. 2, Guwahati: Assam Publication Board, pp. 148–256
