= Siege of Goorumconda =

Siege during the Third Anglo-Mysore War

- Part of the Third Anglo-Mysore War
Date	15 September – 25 December 1791 (101 days)
Location	Bangalore, Mysore, India 13.777°N 78.586°E
Result	Anglo-Hyderabadi victory
Territorial changes	Anglo-Hyderabadi alliance failed to capture Goorumconda in 1790; British captured the fort in 1791

Belligerents
Kingdom of Mysore	Hyderabad; British East India Company

Commanders and leaders
Shezada Hyder Ali	Mahabat Jung; Captain Read

The Siege of Goorumconda (15 September – 25 December 1791) was a series of conflicts fought at Goorumconda, a hill fort northeast of Bangalore, during the Third Anglo-Mysore War. An army of the Nizam of Hyderabad, assisted by British East India Company forces, captured the outer works of the town on 20 November, after a one-month siege. Following this, the British troops, which had stormed the works, turned the town over to a detachment of the Nizam's troops. These were surprised and slaughtered by a detachment of Mysorean troops led by Shezada Hyder Ali, the eldest son of Tipu Sultan, on 20 November 1791, who resupplied the fort. The works were again captured by the British on 25 December 1791.
