= 1785 in India =

- Centuries: 16th; 17th; 18th; 19th; 20th
- Decades: 1760s; 1770s; 1780s; 1790s; 1800s
- See also: List of years in India; Timeline of Indian history

Events in the year 1785 in India.

== Incumbents ==
- Rulers ruled the land.

== Events ==
- National income - ₹10,217 million
