= 1796 in India =

- Centuries: 16th; 17th; 18th; 19th; 20th
- Decades: 1770s; 1780s; 1790s; 1800s; 1810s
- See also: List of years in India; Timeline of Indian history

Events in the year 1796 in India.

== Incumbents ==
- John Shore, 1st Baron Teignmouth, Governor-General, 1793–96.
- Marquess Cornwallis, Governor-General, 1796–98 (also 1786–93 and 1805)

== Events ==
- National income - ₹11,055 million
