= 1822 in India =

- Centuries: 17th; 18th; 19th; 20th; 21st
- Decades: 1800s; 1810s; 1820s; 1830s; 1840s
- See also: List of years in India; Timeline of Indian history

Events in the year 1822 in India.

== Incumbents ==
- Mughal emperor: Akbar II

== Events ==
- July 1 – Mumbai Samachar, a Gujarati daily newspaper, is established
