= 1795 in India =

- Centuries: 16th; 17th; 18th; 19th; 20th
- Decades: 1770s; 1780s; 1790s; 1800s; 1810s
- See also: List of years in India; Timeline of Indian history

Events in the year 1795 in India.

== Events ==
- National income - ₹10,952 million
- Trial of Warren Hastings, Governor-General of India, before the House of Lords, 12 Feb. 1788 – 23 Apr. 1795.
- The Nizam of Hyderabad defeated at the Battle of Kharda by the Marathas.
- Travancore comes under British protection; see Company rule in India
