= 1774 in India =

- Centuries: 16th; 17th; 18th; 19th; 20th
- Decades: 1750s; 1760s; 1770s; 1780s; 1790s
- See also: List of years in India; Timeline of Indian history

Events in the year 1774 in India.

== Events ==
- National income - ₹9,670 million
- Warren Hastings, governor of Bengal, appointed the first Governor-General.
- Rampur Raza Library was established in India, located in what is now Uttar Pradesh.
