= 1687 in India =

- Centuries: 15th; 16th; 17th; 18th; 19th
- Decades: 1660s; 1670s; 1680s; 1690s; 1700s
- See also: List of years in India; Timeline of Indian history

Events in the year 1687 in India.

== Events ==
- National income - ₹7,004 million
- Founding of Calcutta by Job Charnock, an East India merchant.
- Conquest of the Deccan by Emperor Aurungzebe; Hyderabad becomes the residence of the governor of the Deccan.
