= 1803 in India =

- Centuries: 17th; 18th; 19th; 20th; 21st
- Decades: 1780s; 1790s; 1800s; 1810s; 1820s
- See also: List of years in India; Timeline of Indian history

Events in the year 1803 in India.

== Events ==
- National income - ₹11,369 million
- 11 September – Battle of Delhi, during the Second Anglo-Maratha War, between British troops under General Lake, and the Marathas of Scindia's army under General Louis Bourquin.
- 17 October – Agra was stormed by the forces commanded by Lord Lake.
- 17 December - Treaty of Deogaon signed between the East India Company and the Rajah of Berar, Raghuji Bhonsle II. Bhonsle ceded territories, including Cuttack and Balasore, to the British.
