= 1813 in India =

- Centuries: 17th; 18th; 19th; 20th; 21st
- Decades: 1790s; 1800s; 1810s; 1820s; 1830s
- See also: List of years in India; Timeline of Indian history

Events in the year 1813 in India.

== Incumbents ==
- The Marquess of Hastings, Governor-General, 1813–22.

== Events ==
- National income - ₹16,193 million
- The East India Company's trading monopoly is abolished.
- The Anglican Bishopric of Calcutta is established, with Thomas Middleton serving as the first bishop.
- The Chowringhee Theatre is inaugurated in Kolkata.

== Law ==
- The Charter Act 1813 was passed in United Kingdom on the company rule in India.
