= 1606 in India =

- Centuries: 15th; 16th; 17th; 18th; 19th
- Decades: 1580s; 1590s; 1600s; 1610s; 1620s
- See also: List of years in India; Timeline of Indian history

Events in the year 1606 in India.

== Events ==
- Dutch blockade of Goa.
- A sixth suffragan See to Goa was established at San Thome, Mylapore, near the modern Madras, and the site of the National Shrine of St. Thomas Basilica, advancing the Christianization of Goa

== Deaths ==
- Guru Arjan, first martyr of Sikh faith and the fifth of the ten Sikh Gurus, died on 30 May in Lahore
- Eknath, Marathi sant, in Paithana
