= 1820 in India =

Events in the year 1820 in India.

== Events ==
- National income - ₹11,684 million
- June 10 – Sir Thomas Munro is appointed as the British colonial Governor of the Madras Presidency, which encompasses most of southern India.

== Law ==
- Divorce Bills Evidence Act (British statute)

- Centuries: 17th; 18th; 19th; 20th; 21st
- Decades: 1800s; 1810s; 1820s; 1830s; 1840s
- See also: List of years in India; Timeline of Indian history

== Births ==
- 26 September – Ishwar Chandra Vidyasagar, the "Father of Bengali prose", educator and social reformer (died 1891)
