= 1784 in India =

- Centuries: 16th; 17th; 18th; 19th; 20th
- Decades: 1760s; 1770s; 1780s; 1790s; 1800s
- See also: List of years in India; Timeline of Indian history

Events in the year 1784 in India.

== Events ==
- 15 January - The Asiatic Society was established.
- 11 March - Treaty of Mangalore signed between a jubilant Tipu Sultan and East India Company bringing a closure to Second Anglo-Mysore War.

== Laws ==
- Pitt's India Act

== Births ==
- Zorawar Singh (Dogra general)
