= 1612 in India =

- Centuries: 15th; 16th; 17th; 18th; 19th
- Decades: 1590s; 1600s; 1610s; 1620s; 1630s
- See also: List of years in India; Timeline of Indian history

Events in the year 1612 in India.

== Events ==
- The Battle of Swally took place.
