= 1756 in India =

- Centuries: 16th; 17th; 18th; 19th; 20th
- Decades: 1730s; 1740s; 1750s; 1760s; 1770s
- See also: List of years in India; Timeline of Indian history

Events in the year 1756 in India.

== Events ==
- National income - ₹9,334 million
- Suraj-ud-Dowlah captures Calcutta.
- 19 June – Confinement of prisoners in the Black Hole of Calcutta.
- Seven Years' War, 1756–63.

== Deaths ==
- Siraj-ud-Din Ali Khan Arzu, Urdu poet and Lexicographer in Delhi. (b. 1687)
