= 1696 in India =

- Centuries: 15th; 16th; 17th; 18th; 19th
- Decades: 1670s; 1680s; 1690s; 1700s; 1710s
- See also: List of years in India; Timeline of Indian history

Events in the year 1696 in India.

== Events ==
- National income - ₹7,877 million
- Building of the fort of Calcutta.
