= 1799 in India =

- Centuries: 16th; 17th; 18th; 19th; 20th
- Decades: 1770s; 1780s; 1790s; 1800s; 1810s
- See also: List of years in India; Timeline of Indian history

Events in the year 1799 in India.

== Events ==
- National income - ₹11,245 million
- Fourth Anglo-Mysore War.
- Storming of Seringapatam and death of Tipu Sahib.
- The Nizam of Hyderabad accepts a permanent alliance with the British.
- On 25 October 1799, Serfoji II of Thanjavur cedes the State of Thanjavur to the East India Company, receiving in return an annual income of a lakh of Pagodas.
