= 1802 in India =

- Centuries: 17th; 18th; 19th; 20th; 21st
- Decades: 1780s; 1790s; 1800s; 1810s; 1820s
- See also: List of years in India; Timeline of Indian history

The following events occurred in India in the year 1802.

== Events ==
- National income - ₹11,115 million
- Treaty of Bassein.
- Maratha Wars, 1802–05.

== Law ==
- Criminal Jurisdiction Act (British statute)
