= 1818 in India =

- Centuries: 17th; 18th; 19th; 20th; 21st
- Decades: 1790s; 1800s; 1810s; 1820s; 1830s
- See also: List of years in India; Timeline of Indian history

Events in the year 1818 in India.

== Births ==
- 25 August - Shiv Dayal Singh, Founder and First Satguru of Radha Soami faith (died June 15,1878).

== Events ==
- National income - ₹11,927 million
- The first Mill of Cotton clothes in Kolkata
- Manavadar (Bantva-Manavadar) becomes a British Protectorate, a Princely state which was founded in 1733.
- 1 January – The Peshwa defeated at Koregaon by the British.
- 6 January – Treaty of Mandasor is signed between the British and the Marathas.
- February – The Third Anglo-Maratha War which started in 1817 ends with the Marathas defeated by the British
- 20 February – The Peshwa defeated at Ashti by the British.
- 3 June – Baji Rao II surrenders to the British
