= 1772 in India =

- Centuries: 16th; 17th; 18th; 19th; 20th
- Decades: 1750s; 1760s; 1770s; 1780s; 1790s
- See also: List of years in India; Timeline of Indian history

Events in the year 1772 in India.

== Events ==
- National income - ₹9,790 million
- Warren Hastings appointed governor of Bengal.
