= 1805 in India =

- Centuries: 17th; 18th; 19th; 20th; 21st
- Decades: 1780s; 1790s; 1800s; 1810s; 1820s
- See also: List of years in India; Timeline of Indian history

Events in the year 1805 in India.

== Incumbents ==
- Marquess Cornwallis, Governor-General, 1805 (also 1786–93, 1796–98)
- Sir George Barlow, 1st Baronet, Governor-General, 1805–07.

== Events ==
- National income - ₹11,704 million
- Maratha Wars, 1802–05.
