= 1827 in India =

- Centuries: 17th; 18th; 19th; 20th; 21st
- Decades: 1800s; 1810s; 1820s; 1830s; 1840s
- See also: List of years in India; Timeline of Indian history

Events in the year 1827 in India.

== Events ==
- March: The Battle of Shaidu took place in Shaidu.

== Births ==
- 3 December – Acharya Rajendrasuri, reformer in Śvetāmbara sect of Jainism (died 1906).
