= 1780 in India =

- Centuries: 16th; 17th; 18th; 19th; 20th
- Decades: 1760s; 1770s; 1780s; 1790s; 1800s
- See also: List of years in India; Timeline of Indian history

Events in the year 1780 in India.

== Events ==
- National income - ₹9,900 million
- 2nd Mysore War.

== Law ==
- East India Company Act (British statute)
