= 1661 in India =

- Centuries: 15th; 16th; 17th; 18th; 19th
- Decades: 1640s; 1650s; 1660s; 1670s; 1680s
- See also: List of years in India; Timeline of Indian history

Events in the year 1661 in India.

== Events ==
- 7 October – Guru Har Krishan becomes the eighth Sikh guru, Guru Ji
- 23 June – Bombay is given to Charles II of England as the marriage portion of Catherine of Portugal.

== Deaths ==
- 8 March Guru Har Rai seventh Sikh guru dies (born 1630)
