= Timeline of South Asian history =

Below is a timeline of South Asian history.

South Asia Timetable
Timeline and cultural period	Westcoast	Northwestern Sub-continent (West Punjab-Khyber Pakhtunkhwa)	Indo-Gangetic Plain			Central India; Deccan Plateau	Southern India
Timeline and cultural period	Westcoast	Northwestern Sub-continent (West Punjab-Khyber Pakhtunkhwa)	Western Gangetic Plain (Kurukshetra)	Northern India (Central Gangetic Plain)	Northeastern India (Bengal)	Central India; Deccan Plateau	Southern India
South Asian Stone Age (until c. 3300 BCE)						South Asian Stone Age (until c. 1100 BCE)	
Culture	Paleolithicum (until c. 10,000 BCE)						
70,000 - 10,000 BCE		Sanghao Caves				Bhimbetka rock shelters (30,000-15,000 BCE)	
Culture	Mesolithicum (c. 10,000-7,000 BCE)						Mesolithicum (c. 10,000-3,000 BCE)
c. 10,000-7,000 BCE							
Culture	Neolithicum (c. 7000-3300 BCE)						Mesolithicum (c. 10,000-3000 BCE)
c. 7,000-3,300 BCE		Mehrgarh					
BRONZE AGE (c. 3300-1100 BCE)							NEOLITHIC (c. 3000-1400 BCE)
Culture		Early Harappan					
3300-2600 BCE		Early Harappan					
Culture		Integration Era					
2600-1900 BCE	Indus Valley civilization	Indus Valley civilization	Indus Valley civilization				
Culture		Localisation Era/Late Harappan; OCP/Cemetery H					
1900-1500 BCE				Earliest known rice cultivation			
Culture		Localisation Era/Late Harappan; OCP • Cemetery H • Early Vedic period • Gandhara grave culture					Megalithic (c. 1400-1100 BCE)
1500-1300 BCE		Indo-Aryan migration					
1300-1100 BCE		Wandering Vedic Aryans					
IRON AGE (c. 1100-300 BCE)
Culture		Middle Vedic Period					
Culture		Gandhara grave culture	Black and red ware culture				
1100-800 BCE		Vedic settlements Gandhara	Vedic settlements Kuru				
Culture		Late Vedic Period					
Culture		Gandhara grave culture	(Brahmin ideology) • early Upanishads • Painted Grey Ware culture	(Kshatriya/Shramanic culture) • Northern Black Polished Ware			
800-600 BCE		Gandhara	Kuru-Pancala	Kosala-Videha			
Culture		Late Vedic Period; Mahajanapada					
Culture		Gandhara grave culture	(Brahmin ideology) • early Upanishads • Painted Grey Ware culture	(Kshatriya/Shramanic culture) • Northern Black Polished Ware			
6th century BCE		Gandhara	Kuru-Panchala	Kosala; Magadha; Anga		Adivasi (tribes)	
Culture		Persian-Greek influences	"Second Urbanisation"				
Culture		Persian-Greek influences	Later Upanishads	Rise of Shramana movements Jainism - Buddhism - Ājīvika - Yoga; Later Upanishads			
5th century BCE		(Persian rule)		Shishunaga dynasty		Adivasi (tribes)	
4th century BCE		(Greek conquests)		Nanda Empire; Kalinga		Adivasi (tribes)	
HISTORICAL AGE (after 300 BCE)
Culture	Spread of Buddhism					Pre-history	Sangam period (300 BCE – 200 CE)
3rd century BCE	Maurya Empire						Early Cholas; Early Pandyan Kingdom; Satavahana dynasty Cheras
Culture	Preclassical Hinduism - "Hindu Synthesis" (c. 200 BCE-300 CE); Epics - Puranas - Ramayana - Mahabharata - Bhagavad Gita - Brahma Sutras - Smarta Tradition; Mahayana Buddhism						Sangam period (continued) (300 BCE – 200 CE)
2nd century BCE		Indo-Greek Kingdom		Shunga Empire		Adivasi (tribes)	Early Cholas; Early Pandyan Kingdom; Satavahana dynasty Cheras
1st century BCE			Yona	Maha-Meghavahana Dynasty		Adivasi (tribes)	Early Cholas; Early Pandyan Kingdom; Satavahana dynasty Cheras
1st century CE		Indo-Scythians; Indo-Parthians		Kuninda Kingdom		Adivasi (tribes)	Early Cholas; Early Pandyan Kingdom; Satavahana dynasty Cheras
2nd century			Pahlava		Varman dynasty	Adivasi (tribes)	Early Cholas; Early Pandyan Kingdom; Satavahana dynasty Cheras
3rd century			Kushan Empire	Western Satraps	Kamarupa kingdom	Adivasi (tribes)	Kalabhra dynasty
Culture	"Golden Age of Hinduism"(c. 320-650 CE); Puranas; Co-existence of Hinduism and Buddhism						
4th century	Gupta Empire						Kadamba Dynasty; Western Ganga Dynasty
5th century	Gupta Empire						Vishnukundina
6th century	Maitraka					Adivasi (tribes)	
Culture	Late-Classical Hinduism (c. 650-1100 CE); Advaita Vedanta - Tantra; Decline of Buddhism in India						
7th century	Maitraka	Indo-Sassanids		Vakataka dynasty Empire of Harsha	Mlechchha dynasty	Adivasi (tribes)	Pallava
8th century	Maitraka		Kidarite Kingdom			Adivasi (tribes)	Kalachuri
9th century		Indo-Hephthalites (Huna)		Gurjara-Pratihara		Adivasi (tribes)	Chalukya
10th century					Pala dynasty Kamboja-Pala dynasty	Adivasi (tribes)	Rashtrakuta
Culture	Islamic rule and "Sects of Hinduism" (c. 1100-1850 CE) - Medieval and Late Puranic Period (500–1500 CE)						
11th century	Western Chalukyas	(Islamic conquests); Kabul Shahi (Islamic Empire)	Rajputs	Pala Empire; Paramara dynasty Chaulukya dynasty Eastern Ganga dynasty	Sena dynasty	Adivasi (tribes)	Chola Empire; Yadava dynasty Western Chalukyas; Eastern Chalukyas; Kakatiya dynasty Hoysala Empire
12th century	Western Chalukyas		Rajputs	Paramara dynasty Chaulukya dynasty Eastern Ganga dynasty	Sena dynasty	Adivasi (tribes)	Chola Empire; Yadava dynasty Western Chalukyas; Eastern Chalukyas; Kakatiya dynasty Hoysala Empire
13th century		Delhi Sultanate				Adivasi (tribes)	Chola Empire
14th century			Delhi Sultanate			Adivasi (tribes)	Vijayanagara Empire
15th century			Delhi Sultanate			Adivasi (tribes)	Vijayanagara Empire
16th century	Mughal Empire					Adivasi (tribes)	Vijayanagara Empire
17th century	Mughal Empire						Maratha Empire
Culture	Maratha Empire and British Colonisation - Company rule in India						
18th century	Maratha Empire		Maratha Empire		British	Maratha Empire/British	
Culture	British Colonisation - British Raj						
19th century		Sikh Empire					
Culture	British Raj - Independence struggle - Pakistan - India - Bangladesh						
20th century	Pakistan		India		Bangladesh	India	
21st century	Pakistan		India		Bangladesh	India	

== See also ==
- Outline of South Asian history
- Timeline of Bangladeshi history
- Timeline of Indian history
- Timeline of Pakistani history

== Sources ==
- Flood, Gavin D. (1996), An Introduction to Hinduism, Cambridge University Press
- Hiltebeitel, Alf (2002), Hinduism. In: Joseph Kitagawa, "The Religious Traditions of Asia: Religion, History, and Culture", Routledge, ISBN 978-1-136-87597-7
- Michaels, Axel (2004), Hinduism. Past and present, Princeton, New Jersey: Princeton University Press
- Samuel, Geoffrey (2010), The Origins of Yoga and Tantra. Indic Religions to the Thirteenth Century, Cambridge University Press
