= 1806 in India =

- Centuries: 17th; 18th; 19th; 20th; 21st
- Decades: 1780s; 1790s; 1800s; 1810s; 1820s
- See also: List of years in India; Timeline of Indian history

Events in the year 1806 in India.

== Incumbents ==
- Shah Alam II, Mughal Emperor, reigned 10 December 1759 – 19 November 1806
- Akbar II, Mughal Emperor, reigned 19 November 1806 – 28 September 1837
- General Gerard Lake, 1st Viscount Lake, Commander-in-Chief of India, March 1801 – July 1805

== Events ==
- National income - ₹11,730 million
- 19 November – Akbar II Akbar Shah, Mughal Emperor ascended to the throne of Delhi.

== Deaths ==
- 19 November – Shah Alam II, Mughal Emperor
