= 1807 in India =

- Centuries: 17th; 18th; 19th; 20th; 21st
- Decades: 1780s; 1790s; 1800s; 1810s; 1820s
- See also: List of years in India; Timeline of Indian history

Events in the year 1807 in India.

== Incumbents ==
- T Earl of Minto, Governor-General, 1807–1813.

== Events ==
- National income – ₹ 11,794 million
