= 1790 in India =

- Centuries: 16th; 17th; 18th; 19th; 20th
- Decades: 1770s; 1780s; 1790s; 1800s; 1810s
- See also: List of years in India; Timeline of Indian history

Events in the year 1790 in India.

== Events ==
- National income - ₹10,434 million
- Third Anglo-Mysore War.
- 26 October - Kingdom of Coorg became a Protectorate of East India Company.
