= 1758 in India =

- Centuries: 16th; 17th; 18th; 19th; 20th
- Decades: 1730s; 1740s; 1750s; 1760s; 1770s
- See also: List of years in India; Timeline of Indian history

Events in the year 1758 in India.

== Events ==
- National income - ₹9,451 million
- 20 April – Marathas attacked Lahore and occupied it.
- Tukoji Holkar conquered Multan, Dera Ghazi Khan, Kashmir, Attock and Peshawar by 8 May.
- Madras besieged by the French.
