= 1739 in India =

- Centuries: 16th; 17th; 18th; 19th; 20th
- Decades: 1710s; 1720s; 1730s; 1740s; 1750s
- See also: List of years in India; Timeline of Indian history

Events in the year 1739 in India.

== Events ==
- National income – ₹8,776 million
- Nadir Shah invades India from Iran.
- Nadir Shah captures and sacks Delhi.
