= 1605 in India =

- Centuries: 16th; 17th; 18th; 19th
- Decades: 1580s; 1590s; 1600s; 1610s; 1620s
- See also: List of years in India; Timeline of Indian history

Events in the year 1605 in India.

== Events ==
- National income - ₹ 2,269 million
- 15 October – End of the reign of the Mughal Emperor Akbar (reigned since 1556).
- 16 October – The reign of Jehangir begins (reigned till 28 October 1627).

== Deaths ==
- 15 October – Akbar, Mughal Emperor died in the age of 63 in Agra, Mughal India.
