= 1798 in India =

- Centuries: 16th; 17th; 18th; 19th; 20th
- Decades: 1770s; 1780s; 1790s; 1800s; 1810s
- See also: List of years in India; Timeline of Indian history

Events in the year 1798 in India.

== Incumbents ==
- Sir Alured Clarke, Governor-General, 1798
- Marquess Wellesley, Governor-General, 1798–1805.

== Events ==
- National income - ₹11,131 million
- The Fourth Anglo-Mysore War begins.

== Births ==
- 10 November – Charles Phillip Brown, writer and colonial official (died 1884).
