= 1828 in India =

- Centuries: 17th; 18th; 19th; 20th; 21st
- Decades: 1800s; 1810s; 1820s; 1830s; 1840s
- See also: List of years in India; Timeline of Indian history

Events in the year 1828 in India. Raja Rammoyan Roy founded Brahmo Sabha in 1828; it was later renamed Brahmo samaj.

== Incumbents ==
- The Hon. W. Butterworth Bayley, Governor-General.
- Lord William Bentinck, Governor-General, 1828–35.

== Law ==
- Criminal Law (India) Act (British statute)

== Births ==
- Rani Lakshmibai, Queen of Jhansi (probable year; died 1858)
