= 1824 in India =

- Centuries: 17th; 18th; 19th; 20th; 21st
- Decades: 1800s; 1810s; 1820s; 1830s; 1840s
- See also: List of years in India; Timeline of Indian history

Events in the year 1824 in India.

== Law ==
- Slave Trade Act (British statute)

== Births ==
- 12 February – Swami Dayanand Saraswati
- 18 December – Lal Behari Dey, journalist (died 1892)
