= 1644 in India =

- Centuries: 15th; 16th; 17th; 18th; 19th
- Decades: 1620s; 1630s; 1640s; 1650s; 1660s
- See also: List of years in India; Timeline of Indian history

Events in the year 1644 in India.

== Events ==
- The British establish themselves at Madras, building Fort George there.
