= Zavaritski Caldera =

Volcanic crater in the Kuril Islands, Russia

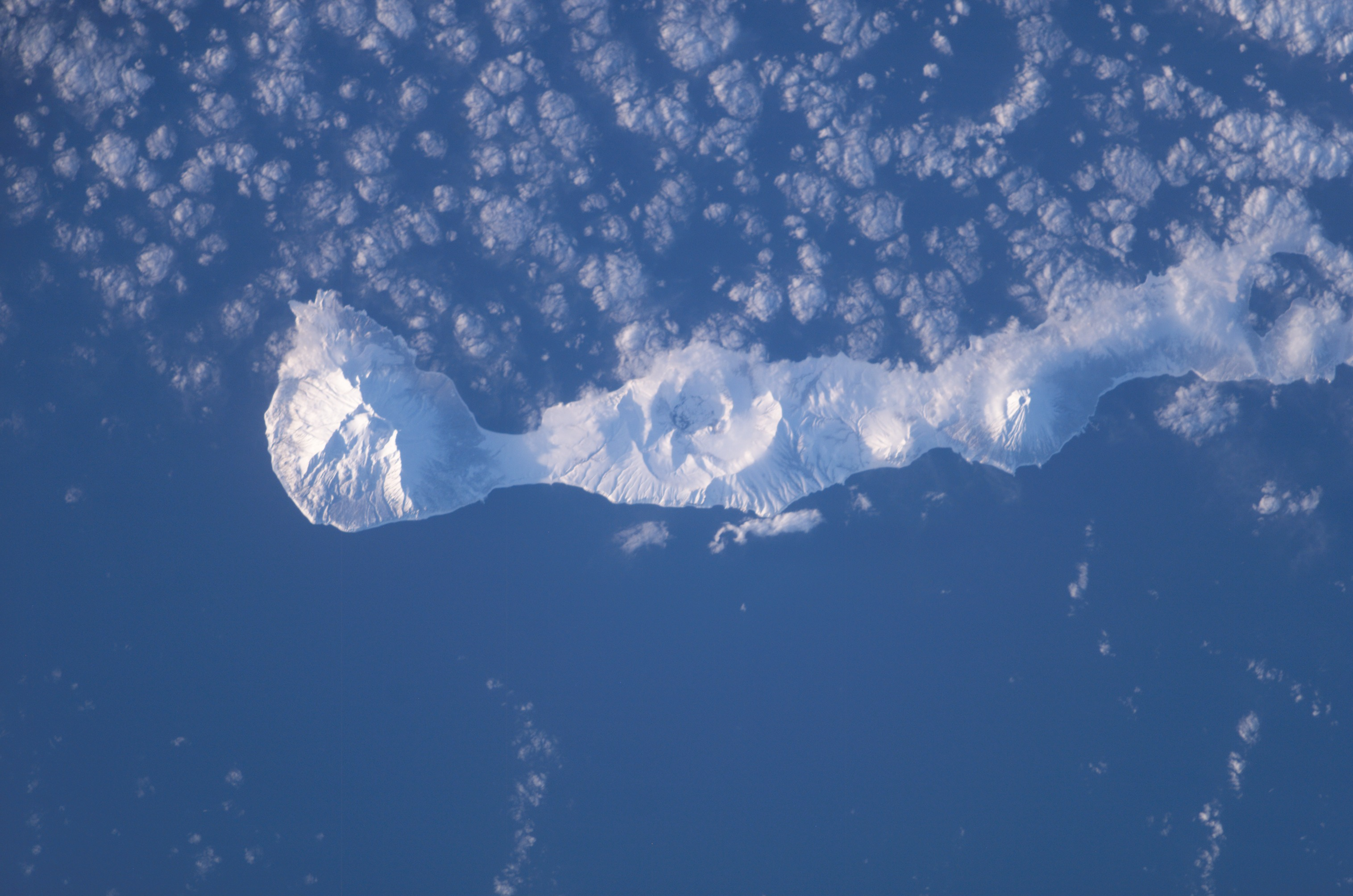

Highest point
- Elevation: 624 m (2,047 ft)
- Coordinates: 46°55′N 151°57′E

Geography
- Location within Far Eastern Federal District
- Location: Simushir, Kuril Islands, Russia

Geology
- Mountain type: Caldera
- Last eruption: November to December 1957

Zavaritski Caldera (Russian: Вулкан Заварицкого, Vulkan Zavaritskogo), also spelled "Zavaritskii" and "Zavaritsky", is a caldera system located in the centre of Simushir island, in the central Kuril Islands, Russia. The volcano is named after Alexander Nikolayevich Zavaritski, a scientist of the Academy of Sciences of the Soviet Union.

== Geology ==
The Zavaritski volcano contains three nested calderas, measuring 3 kilometres (2 miles), 8 km (5 mi) and 10 km (6 mi) in diameter. The youngest caldera, which is partially filled by Lake Biryuzovoe, was formed during the Holocene and features several young volcanic cones and lava domes. The lake surface sits at an elevation of 40 metres (100 feet) above sea level, with the lake bottom at 30 m below sea level. Lake sediments overlying pumice deposits indicate that a previous caldera lake surface existed 200 m (700 ft) above sea level.

The last reported explosive eruption was recorded in November 1957. This destroyed a 500 m (1/3 mi) diameter cone that reportedly grew pre-eruption and had formed a peninsula extending into the lake from the northeast caldera wall. The eruption filled the northwest section of the lake, including the emplacement of a 350 m (1/4 mi) wide, 40 m (100 ft) high dome.

== Evidence of high-magnitude 1831 eruption ==
Research indicates that Zavaritski Caldera may have been the source of a high-magnitude explosive eruption that occurred in 1831, during the Northern Hemisphere summer.

Evidence for the eruption includes sulfate peaks in polar ice cores and from historical observations of atmospheric phenomena in Japanese records (such as observations of an abnormally colored sun). It is thought that the mass injection of sulfur from the eruption caused Northern Hemisphere climate cooling of 0.5–1.0 °C (1–2 °F), coincided with fluctuations in the Indian and African monsoons, and preceded major famines (including the Guntur famine of 1832 in India and the Tenpō famine in Japan). However, the source of this major eruption has remained a mystery.

The researchers, led by volcanologist William Hutchison, conducted geochemical analyses of several Greenland ice cores. They found, coinciding with the sulphate peaks from the 1831 eruption, microscopic layers of tephra that chemically matched deposits from the most recent Plinian Zavaritski eruption, dated to the early 19th century. Modelling suggests that the eruption could have been a VEI 5/6-magnitude eruption event. The reconstructed radiative forcing of the eruption is comparable to the 1991 eruption of Mount Pinatubo, and may account for the climatic cooling observed between 1831–1833.

== See also ==
- List of volcanoes in Russia
- Tectonic–climatic interaction
