= 1761 in India =

- Centuries: 16th; 17th; 18th; 19th; 20th
- Decades: 1740s; 1750s; 1760s; 1770s; 1780s
- See also: List of years in India; Timeline of Indian history

Events in India in 1761

== Incumbents ==
- Shah Alam II, Mughal Emperor, reigned 10 December 1759 – 19 November 1806
- Brigadier general John Carnac, Commander-in Chief of India December 1860– April 1761
- Lieutenant-General Eyre Coote (East India Company officer), Commander-in Chief of India April 1761– 1763
- Mir Qasim, Nawab of Bengal and Murshidabad, 20 October 1760 – 7 July 1763

== Events ==
- National income - ₹9,456 million
- 14 January – Third Battle of Panipat

== Deaths ==
- 14 January
  - Sadashivrao Bhau, 30, CINC of Maratha Army of India
  - Vishwasrao
  - Ibrahim Khan Gardi
  - Shamsher Bahadur I
  - Jankoji Rao Scindia
- 23 June - Nanasaheb Peshwa, 3rd Peshwa of Maratha Empire
- 9 December – Tarabai, Queen of Maratha Empire. (b. 1675)
