= 1707 in India =

- Centuries: 16th; 17th; 18th; 19th; 20th
- Decades: 1680s; 1690s; 1700s; 1710s; 1720s
- See also: List of years in India; Timeline of Indian history

Events in the year 1707 in India.

== Incumbents ==
- Aurangzeb, Mughal Emperor, 31 July 1658- 3 March 1707.
- Bahadur Shah I, Mughal Emperor, 19 June 1707 – 27 February 1712
- Muhammad Azam Shah, self-proclaimed Mughal Emperor, 14 March 1707 – 8 June 1707
- Sukhrungphaa, King of the Ahom kingdom, 1696–1714
- Dost Mohammad of Bhopal, Nawab of Bhopal State, 1707-1728
- Bhagatsimhji Udaisimhji, Thakur Sahib of Wadhwan State, 1681–1707
- Arjansimhji Madhavsimhji, Thakur Sahib of Wadhwan State, 1707–1739
- Ram Singh I, Maharao of Kota State, April 1696-18 June 1707
- Kanthirava Narasaraja II, Wodeyar of Mysore, 1704-1714
- Rama Varma V, Maharajah of Cochin, 1701-1721
- Amar Singh II, Rajput Mewar (Sisodia), 1698–1710
- Chakdor Namgyal, Chogyal of Sikkim, 1700-1717
- Rajaram Chhatrapati, Chhatrapati of the Maratha Empire, 1688-1707
- Tarabai, Regent of the Maratha Empire, 1700–1707

== Events ==
- National income - ₹8,228 million
- Mughal–Maratha Wars ended in May following Mughal Emperor Aurangzeb's death
- Brothers Bahadur Shah I and Muhammad Azam Shah fought the Battle of Jajau on 20 June to determine Mughal succession, leaving Bahadur Shah I in power after 32,000 died
- The Delhi Army under Nawab Daud Khan captured Vellore Fort after defeating the Marathas
- Dost Mohammad of Bhopal founded Bhopal State
- Bundi State conquered Kota State on 18 June and held the territory for six years
- Sukhrungphaa established Rangpur, the capital of the Ahom kingdom
- Senapati, the grandson of Maharaja Chhatrasal, built Raja Ka Tal reservoir
- Construction of the Darbar building in Dehradun was completed

== Births ==
- Chimnaji Appa, Maratha military commander who liberated the western coast of India from Portuguese rule
- Suraj Mal, ruler of Bharatpur State in Rajasthan, born in February
- Bhim Singh Rana, ruler of princely state Gohad, in northwestern Madhya Pradesh

== Deaths ==
- Aurangzeb, Mughal Emperor, on 3 March 1707 in Ahmednagar, Mughal Empire
- Muhammad Azam Shah, self-proclaimed Mughal Emperor, on 8 June in Jajau
- Bidar Bakht, Muhammad Azam Shah's son, on 8 June in Jajau
- Shahzada Jawan Bakht Bahadur, Muhammad Azam Shah's son, on 8 June in Jajau
- Shahzada Sikandar Shan Bahadur, Muhammad Azam Shah's son, on 8 June in Jajau
- Udaipuri Mahal, at some point after 8 June in Gwalior
- Zubdat-un-Nissa, Mughal princess and the third daughter of Emperor Aurangzeb and his Empress consort Dilras Banu Begum, on 17 February in Delhi
- Wali Mohammed Wali, classical Urdu poet, died in Ahmedabad, Gujarat
- Ram Singh I, Maharao of Kota State, 18 June 1707
