= 1757 in India =

- Centuries: 16th; 17th; 18th; 19th; 20th
- Decades: 1730s; 1740s; 1750s; 1760s; 1770s
- See also: List of years in India; Timeline of Indian history

Events in the year 1757 in India.

== Events ==
National income - ₹9,322 million

- January – Recapture of Calcutta.
- Battle of Plassey.
- Sack of Delhi.
