= 1817 in India =

- Centuries: 17th; 18th; 19th; 20th; 21st
- Decades: 1790s; 1800s; 1810s; 1820s; 1830s
- See also: List of years in India; Timeline of Indian history

Events in the year 1817 in India.

== Events ==
- National income - ₹11,450 million
- 17 June - Gowri Parvati Bayi, regent of Travancore announces state funding for Education.
- November – Third Anglo-Maratha War begins and continues through to 1818.
- 26 November - Battle of Sitabuldi between Appa Saheb Bhonsle and East India Company.
- May - December - Paika Rebellion led by Bakshi Jagabandhu against the East India Company.

== Law ==
- Madras Regulation Act 1817 brings temples in Madras Presidency under East India Company.

== Births ==
- 15 May – Debendranath Tagore, founder in 1848 of the Brahmo Religion (died 1905).
- 17 October – Syed Ahmad Khan, founder in 1875 of the Aligarh Muslim University (died 1898).
