= Jatakalankara =

Sanskrit treatise on Hindu astrology

- Author: Ganesa
- Language: Sanskrit
- Subject: Astrology
- Publication place: India

Jatakalankara is a brief Sanskrit treatise comprising one hundred twenty-five slokas or verses on the predictive part of Hindu astrology written in the classic Sloka format in the Srgdhara meter. It was written by Poet Ganesa, son of Gopal Das (who was the second son of Kanhaji, and who was himself an accomplished poet, dramatist, artist and mathematician), in the year 1613 and describes many yoga-formations that have immediate bearing on various aspects of human life. Ganesha wrote this treatise to please his Guru Shiva Its first translation into English was probably published, along with the original text, in 1941 by Sri Vijay Lakshmi Vilas Press.

Ganesa examined the planetary influences on the health of individuals while observing that ritualistic remedia scriptures, medical and astronomico-astrological texts of instruction are propitiable as well as religious scriptures.. At the International Sanskrit Conference it was brought on record that Ganesa, son of Gopala, wrote this treatise in Vrddhapura (Vadanagara).

This work describing numerous planetary combinations yogas, some unique, some auspicious and other inauspicious, is divided into seven Adhyayas or chapters, viz – 1) Sangyadhyaya (12 stanzas) dealing with preliminaries, 2) Bhavadhyaya (38 stanzas) dealing with nature, characteristics and results of 12 bhavas i.e. houses, 3) Yogadhyaya (34 stanzas) dealing with planetary combinations and their results, 4) Vishakanyadhyaya (4 stanzas) dealing with combinations which indicate birth of Vishakanyas (inauspicious women), 5) Ayurdayadhyaya (23 stanzas) dealing with longevity, 6) Vaiparityasthadhyaya (9 stanzas) dealing with mutual exchange of signs by planets, and 7) Vanshadhyaya (5 stanzas) dealing with basic information about this text and its author. Its author, Ganesa, belonging to the Bhardwaja Gotra, was the son of Gopaldas. He wrote and completed this work in a village named Suryapur in the month of Bhadrapada Saka year 1536 (1613 CE).
