= 1823 in India =

- Centuries: 17th; 18th; 19th; 20th; 21st
- Decades: 1800s; 1810s; 1820s; 1830s; 1840s
- See also: List of years in India; Timeline of Indian history

Events in the year 1823 in India.

== Incumbents ==
- The Hon. John Adam, Governor-General, 1 January to 1 August.
- Lord Amherst, Governor-General, 1823–28.

== Events ==
- On 11 September, Sirohi State taken under British protection in return for acknowledgment of supremacy and government in accordance with the advice of the political resident.

== Law ==
- Lascars Act (British statute)
