= Daya Shankar Kaul Nasim =

Urdu poet

Daya Shankar Kaul "Nasim" (1811 – 1845) was an Urdu poet of the 19th century who is best known for his Masnavi Gulzar-e-Nasim (epic Gul Bakawali). He was defended by Brij Narayan Chakbast when it was suggested that he was not the author of this book.
