= Attingal Outbreak =

1721 revolt

The Attingal Outbreak (or Attingal Revolt; April–October 1721) was the massacre of 150 East India Company soldiers by native Indians and the following siege of Fort Anjengo. It is often regarded as the first organized revolt against British authority in Malabar, Cochin, Travancore, and India itself. The main reason behind the resentment was large-scale corruption and the manipulation of black pepper prices by the company.

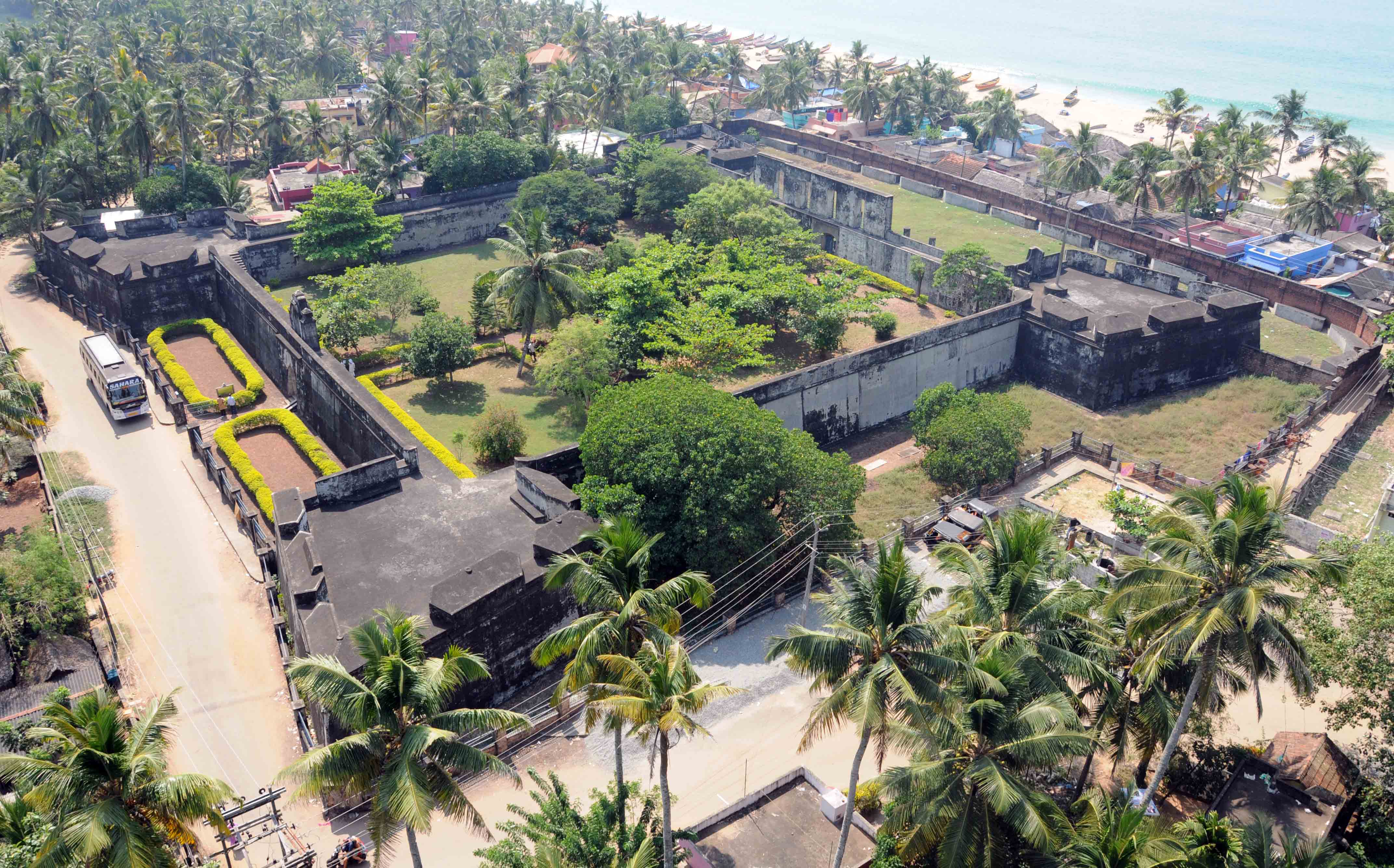
Anjengo Fort

== Background ==
English East India company's involvement in Attingal principality is believed to have begun 1680s. Rani Aswathi Tirunal Umayamma (1677–1684) gave permission to the English to create a settlement at Anchuthengu in 1684. The settlement was fortified beginning in 1695 and the Anjengo/Anchuthengu fort was completed in 1699. The Queen/Rani of Attingal, whose eldest son will be the King of Travancore, had special powers to deal directly with foreign powers. The Dutch and the Pillamars(Nairs) pressurised the queen to prevent fortification of the settlements by the English. However, their efforts failed leading to resentment among many local feudal lords and local people who were also seething against monopolisation of pepper trade by the English, who often paid low prices for the priced produce.

== About the revolt ==
Since the establishment of the factory at Anjengo, the British used to send to the Queen costly gifts from the Fort of Anjengo annually. Meanwhile, Kudamon Pillai, one of the Ettuveettil Pillais (Pillamar in Malayalam), the chieftains of the King, demanded that the gifts be presented to the Queen through them only. The chief factor at the Anjengo factor, Gyfford however refused to hand over the customary gifts meant for the Rani of Attingal to the agents of the local feudal lords (Pillamar) and tried to hand them directly to the Rani. In April 1721, around 140 British troops started their journey from Anjengo to the palace of Attingal for this purpose. This show of force had the opposite effect and the local people rebelled mainly nair soldiers and Muslim merchants, attacked, and destroyed the entire force on their boats in the river, at Kollampuzha, which is very close to the Attingal palace. It is believed that the attack took place while the group was on their way to Anchuthengu by the Vaamanapuram river after visiting the palace.

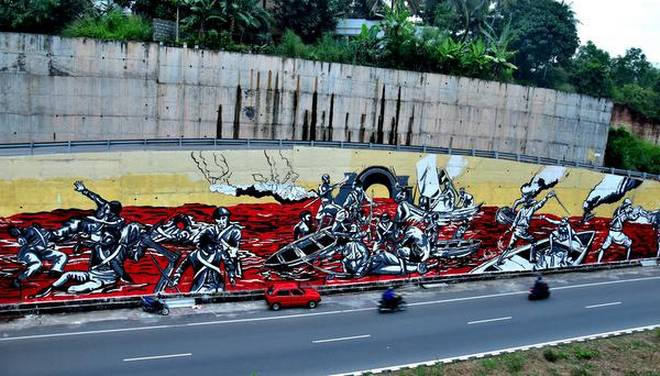
A public artwork depicting the revolt, from Thiruvananthapuram

There is uncertainty as to how many Britishmen were killed in the attack. Various numbers like 140, 141, 151 are mentioned. A letter sent by the Queen of Attingal to the company on 10 January 1731 states that William Gifford and 10 Britishmen had been killed. In June of the same year the Queen of Attingal sent a letter to the Governor of St. Fort mentioning 150 soldiers. This probable means that along with 11 Britishmen, native soldiers were also killed and a small battle took place. There is an opinion among a group of historians that the revolt took place with the prior permission of the queen. The local people then laid siege to the fort and it was said that the siege continued for about 6 months. Samuel Ince, the gunner, led the defence of the fort for six months till the arrival of the company's troops from the British controlled Tellicherry. The reinforced British then suppressed the revolt.

Following the turn of events, the Company and the Rani of Attingal entered into an agreement under which:

- The company was compensated for all losses sustained during the attack on Anjengo
- It was given the sole monopoly of trade in pepper
- It was given the right to erect factories in places of its choice
