= 1829 in India =

- Centuries: 17th; 18th; 19th; 20th; 21st
- Decades: 1800s; 1810s; 1820s; 1830s; 1840s
- See also: List of years in India; Timeline of Indian history

Events in the year 1829 in India.

== Incumbents ==
- Akbar II, Mughal Emperor of Delhi

== Law ==
- Measures against Thuggee and sati (practice) are introduced.
- 4 December – Bengal Sati Regulation, 1829
