= 1830 in India =

- Centuries: 17th; 18th; 19th; 20th; 21st
- Decades: 1810s; 1820s; 1830s; 1840s; 1850s
- See also: List of years in India; Timeline of Indian history

Events in the year 1830 in India.

== Events ==
- National income - ₹9,100 million
- Mysore rebellion.
- Scottish Church College
- Thuggee and Dacoity Department
- Vellore Central Prison

== Law ==
- Illusory Appointments Act (British statute)
- Debts Recovery Act (British statute)
- Infants' Property Act (British statute)
- Colonial Offices Act (British statute)
