= Guntur famine of 1832 =

Famine in India

Guntur famine of 1832 డొక్కల కరువు
- Country: India
- Location: Guntur, Madras Presidency
- Period: 1832 - 1833
- Excess mortality: 150,000
- Death rate: 33%
- Causes: policy failure, drought, back-to-back poor harvests
- Effect on demographics: population declined by 33% due to mortality
- Consequences: Dowleswaram Barrage built
- Preceded by: 1812-13 famine in western India
- Succeeded by: Orissa famine of 1866

The Guntur famine of 1832 (also known as Dokkala Karuvu, or Nandana Karuvu, Pedda Karuvu, Dhatu Karuvu, Valasa Karuvu, Musti karuvu or Dobba Karuvu) was a famine which occurred in Guntur, Madras Presidency from 1832 to 1833. It occurred following widespread crop failures in region which was exacerbated by heavily levels of taxation levied by local authorities..

== Deaths and loss of revenue for the East India Company ==
The famine killed 150,000 people, a third of Guntur's population of 500,000 through starvation. It also led to the deaths of 74,000 bulls, 159,000 cattle and 300,000 sheep and goats. From 1833 to 1848, the East India Company reported a loss of revenue of over 2.5 million pound sterling due to the famine, which also extended southwards to Madras.

== Possible cause ==
In 2025, scientists suggested that the famine may have been caused by climate disruptions from an 1831 eruption of the Zavaritski Caldera in Russia.

== See also ==
- Bengal famine of 1943
- Famine in India
