= Shezada Hyder Ali =

Grandson of Hyder Ali

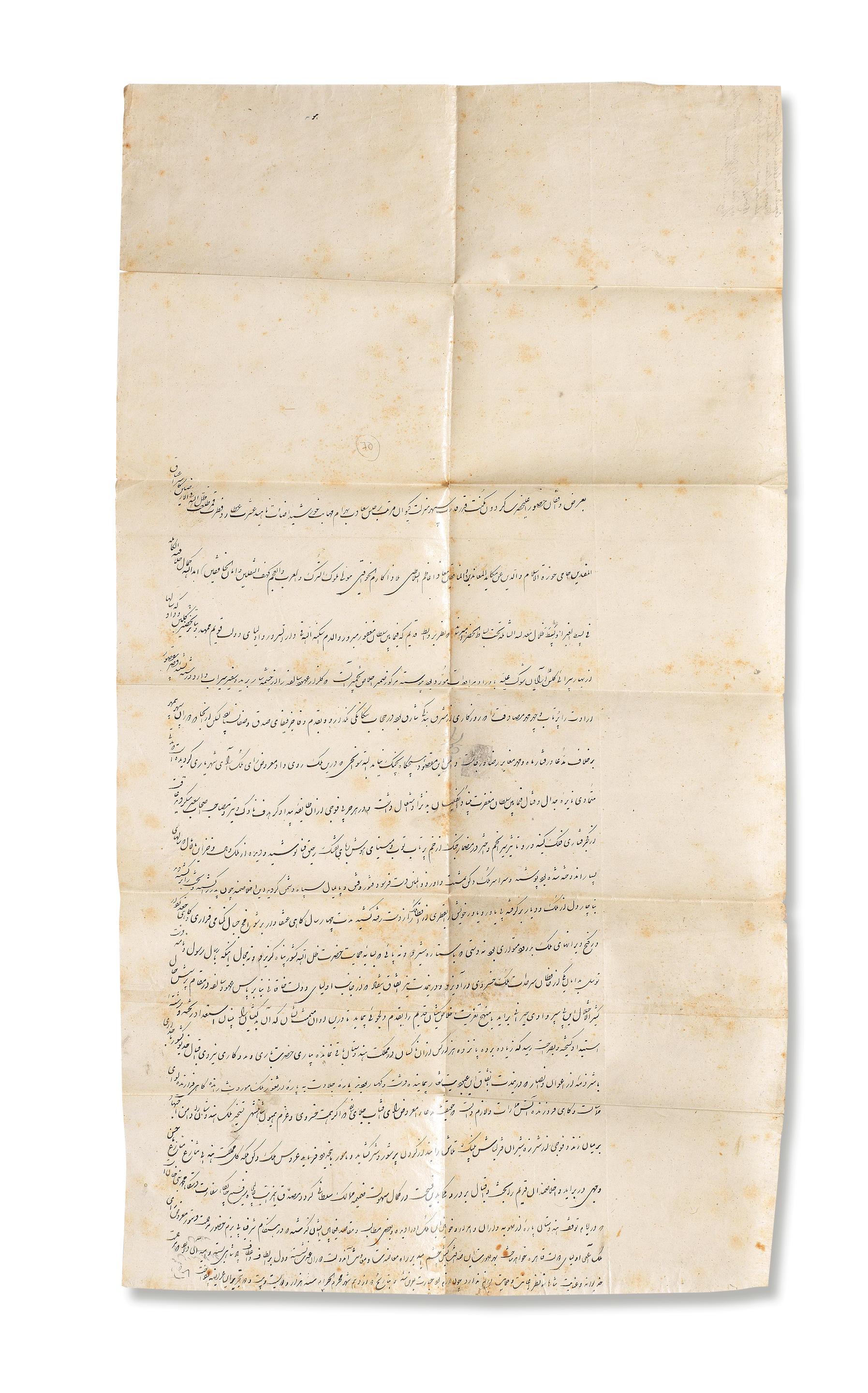
A copy of a letter from Prince Hyder, requesting military aid from Fath-Ali Shah r. 1797-1834), the King of Qajar Iran. Copy created in Iran, Persian manuscript, the original dated 22nd March 1807, the copy roughly contemporary

Shahzada Hayder Ali was the grandson of Hyder Ali and the eldest son of Tipu Sultan.

After the fall of Srirangapattana and death of Tipu Sultan on 4 May 1799, Shezada Hyder Ali and other family members were sent to the Vellore fort on 19 June 1799 and kept under custody of the East India Company. Shezada Hyder Ali managed to escape.

On July 10, 1806, at the marriage of one of Tipu Sultan's daughters at the Vellore fort, Indian soldiers staged a revolt known as the Vellore Mutiny, opening fire in the fort (mandapam), killing several army officers and taking control of the fort's arms and ammunition. They pulled down the Union Jack flag, hoisted the Royal Tiger Flag of Tipu Sultan in its stead, and declared Shezada Hyder Ali as their king. However, they failed to close the gates of the fort securely, and a British officer escaped and alerted the garrison in Arcot. Nine hours later, the British 19th Light Dragoons, led by Colonel Rollo Gillespie, and the Madras Cavalry recaptured the fort. Nearly 350 of the rebels were killed, and another 350 injured before the fighting had stopped. Some accounts state that 17 Indian officers were hanged in public and many were imprisoned at the Vellore and Tiruchi prisons.

Shezada Hyder Ali later married Zaibunnisa Begum of Bijapur. They had a son, Fateh Ahmed Sahib, in Bijapur in 1816. Today, many of Shezada Hyder Ali's descendants live in Calcutta, Karnataka, Andhra Pradesh, and Sydney (Australia).
