= 1710 in India =

Events in the year 1710 in India.

== Incumbents ==
- Mughal emperor: Bahadur Shah I

== Events ==
- National income - ₹8,210 million

== Deaths ==
- Ghazi ud-Din Khan Feroze Jung I
