= Timeline of Indian history =

This is a timeline of Indian history, comprising important legal and territorial changes and political events in India and its predecessor states. To read about the background to these events, see History of India. Also see the list of governors-general of India, list of prime ministers of India and list of years in India.

== Pre-historic India ==
=== Pre-90th century BCE (BC) ===
Year	Date	Event
4,000,000 – 100,000 BCE		Tools crafted by proto-humans that have been dated back two million years have been discovered in the northwestern subcontinent. The earliest archaeological site in the subcontinent is the palaeolithic hominid site in the Soan River valley. Soanian sites are found in the Sivalik region across what are now India, Pakistan, and Nepal. Some of the Bhimbetka rock shelters were inhabited by Homo erectus more than 100,000 years ago. Evidence suggested that occupation of the Indian subcontinent by hominins was sporadic until circa 700,000 years ago, and was geographically widespread by around 250,000 years ago. Madrasian culture sites have been found in Attirampakkam (Attrambakkam=13° 13' 50", 79° 53' 20"), which is located near Chennai (formerly known as Madras), Tamil Nadu. Thereafter, tools related to this culture have been found at various other locations in this region. Bifacial handaxes and cleavers are typical assemblages recovered of this culture. Flake tools, microliths and other chopping tools have also been found. Most of these tools were composed of the metamorphic rock quartzite. The stone tool artifacts in this assemblage have been identified as a part of the second inter-pluvial period in India. Evidence for presence of Hominins with Acheulean technology 150,000–100,000 BCE in Tamil Nadu.
74,000–30,000 BCE		Technology similar to contemporary artifacts found used by Homo sapiens in Africa found in Jwalapuram around 74,000 BCE. Paleolithic industries in South India Tamil Nadu 30,000 BCE.

=== 90th–50th century BCE ===
Year	Date	Event
9,000 BCE		Early Neolithic culture with first confirmed semi-permanent settlements appeared 11,000 years ago in the Bhimbetka rock shelters in modern Madhya Pradesh, India. Some of the Stone Age cave paintings found among the Bhimbetka rock shelters are approximately 30,000 years old. The ancient history of the region includes some of Indian subcontinent's oldest settlements and some of its major civilizations.

== Bronze Age India ==
=== 50th–40th century BCE ===
Year	Date	Event
4000 BCE		Phase of the Indus Valley Civilisation begins. The civilization used an early form of the Indus signs, now called Indus script. Over the course of the next 1000–1500 years, inhabitants of the civilization developed new techniques in handicraft (carnelian products, seal carving) and metallurgy (copper, bronze, lead, and tin) had elaborate urban planning, baked brick houses, efficient drainage systems, water supply systems, and clusters of large non-residential buildings. The civilization depended significantly on trade, was the first civilization to use wheeled transport in the form of bullock carts, and also used boats.

=== 30th–20th century BCE ===
Year	Date	Event
2800 BCE		The Indus Valley Civilization expand across the whole of modern-day Pakistan, much of northern India, and large parts of Afghanistan, with Harappa and Mohenjo-daro becoming large metropolises.
2600 BCE		End of the Early Indus Valley Civilization culture. Start of Mature Indus Valley Civilization culture.

=== 19th century BCE ===
Year	Date	Event
1900 BCE		End of Mature Indus Valley Civilization culture, late Indus Valley Civilization period starts.

=== 18th century BCE ===
Year	Date	Event
1800 BCE		Adichanallur urn-burial site in Tirunelveli district in Tamil Nadu. In 2004, a number of skeletons dating from around 3,800 years ago.

== Iron Age India ==
=== 17th century BCE ===
Year	Date	Event
1700 BCE		Brihadratha also known as Maharatha, was the initiator of the Brihadratha dynasty, the earliest ruling dynasty of Magadha according to the Puranas.
1680 BCE		Jarasandha was the son of Brihadratha and became the 2nd ruler of the Barhadratha dynasty of Magadha succeeding his father.
1665 BCE		Sahadeva of Magadha became the 3rd ruler of the Barhadratha dynasty of Magadha succeeding Jarasandha.
1661 BCE		Somadhi became the 4th ruler of the Barhadratha dynasty of Magadha succeeding Sahadeva of Magadha.
1603 BCE		Srutasravas became the 5th ruler of the Barhadratha dynasty of Magadha succeeding Somadhi.

=== 16th century BCE ===
Year	Date	Event
1539 BCE		Ayutayus became the 6th ruler of the Barhadratha dynasty of Magadha succeeding Srutasravas.
1503 BCE		Niramitra became the 7th ruler of the Barhadratha dynasty of Magadha succeeding Ayutayus.

=== 15th century BCE ===
Year	Date	Event
1500 BCE		Early Vedic period (until 1000 BCE) begins.
1463 BCE		Sukshatra became the 8th ruler of the Barhadratha dynasty of Magadha succeeding Niramitra.
1405 BCE		Brihatkarman became the 9th ruler of the Barhadratha dynasty of Magadha succeeding Sukshatra.

=== 14th century BCE ===
Year	Date	Event
1400 BCE		Gopala Dynasty established by Gopa.
1382 BCE		Senajit became the 10th ruler of the Barhadratha dynasty of Magadha succeeding Brihatkarman.
1332 BCE		Srutanjaya became the 11th ruler of the Barhadratha dynasty of Magadha succeeding Senajit.

=== 13th century BCE ===
Year	Date	Event
1300 BCE		Indus Valley Civilization and Cemetery H culture comes to an end.
1292 BCE		Vipra became the 12th ruler of the Barhadratha dynasty of Magadha succeeding Srutanjaya.
1280 BCE		Pundravardhana Kingdom was established sometime before 1280 BCE.
1257 BCE		Suchi became the 13th ruler of the Barhadratha dynasty of Magadha succeeding Vipra.

=== 12th century BCE ===
Year	Date	Event
1200 BCE		Rigveda codified. The Kuru kingdom is established.
1199 BCE		Kshemya became the 14th ruler of the Barhadratha dynasty of Magadha succeeding Suchi.
1171 BCE		Subrata became the 15th ruler of the Barhadratha dynasty of Magadha succeeding Kshemya.
1107 BCE		Dharma became the 16th ruler of the Barhadratha dynasty of Magadha succeeding Subrata.

=== 11th century BCE ===
Year	Date	Event
1043 BCE		Dharma stepped down as the 16th ruler of the Barhadratha dynasty of Magadha.
1008 BCE		Susuma became the 17th ruler of the Barhadratha dynasty of Magadha succeeding Dharma.

=== 10th century BCE ===
Year	Date	Event
1000 BCE		Middle and Late Vedic period (to 500 BCE).
1000 – 300 BCE		Kanchi district, gold mine of Megalithic sites in Tamil Nadu, South India.
1000- 900 BCE		Kingdom of the Videhas and the Pañcāla Kingdom was established.
970 BCE		Dridhasena became the 18th ruler of the Barhadratha dynasty of Magadha succeeding Susuma.
912 BCE		Sumati became the 19th ruler of the Barhadratha dynasty of Magadha succeeding Dridhasena.

=== 9th century BCE ===
Year	Date	Event
879 BCE		Subala became the 20th ruler of the Barhadratha dynasty of Magadha succeeding Sumati.
877 BCE		Birth of Parsvanatha, 23rd Jain Tirthankara (traditional date).
857 BCE		Sunita became the 21st ruler of the Barhadratha dynasty of Magadha succeeding Subala.
841 BCE		Gopala Dynasty was de-established.
817 BCE		Satyajit became the 22nd ruler of the Barhadratha dynasty of Magadha succeeding Sunita.

=== 8th century BCE ===
Year	Date	Event
767 BCE		Viswajit became the 23rd ruler of the Barhadratha dynasty of Magadha succeeding Satyajit.
732 BCE		Ripunjaya became the 24th and the last ruler of the Barhadratha dynasty of Magadha succeeding Viswajit.

=== 7th century BCE ===
Year	Date	Event
700 BCE		The Upanishads, a sacred text of Hinduism, are written.
700 BCE		Kingdom of Kosala was established. Kosala belonged to the Northern Black Polished Ware culture (c. 700–300 BCE).

=== 6th century BCE ===
Year	Date	Event
600 BCE		Sixteen Maha Janapadas ("Great Realms" or "Great Kingdoms") emerge.
600 BCE		The Chola, Pandya, and Chera dynasties are established.
600 BCE		The capital of the Early Pandyan Kingdom was initially Korkai, all around 600 BCE, and was later moved to Koodal (now Madurai) during the reign of Nedunjeliyan I.
599 BCE		Mahavira of the 24th Tirthankara is born. This turns out to become the most famous wave of Jainism.
563 BCE		Siddhārtha Gautama, Buddha-to-be, is born in Lumbini into a leading royal family in the republic of the Shakyas, which is now part of Nepal.
543 BCE		The Vanga-based Prince Vijaya (c. 543 BCE) married a daughter of the Pandyan king of Madurai, to whom he was sending rich presents every year. Sinhala chronicle Mahavamsa or the Great Chronicle of Sri Lanka mentions this event.
538 BCE		Cyrus, founder of the Persian Achaemenid Empire reached up to northwestern parts of the Indian subcontinent, today's Afghanistan.
527 BCE		Nirvana of Mahavira achieves Moksha.
c. 525 BCE		Kuru kingdom was de-established.

=== 5th century BCE ===
Year	Date	Event
c. 500 BCE		The Vedic period ends.
483 BCE		Proposed Mahaparinirvana date of Gautama Buddha at Kushinagar.

=== 4th century BCE ===
Year	Date	Event
400 BCE		Siddhartha Gautama 'Buddha' of the Shakya polity in South Nepal, founds Buddhism (older date: 563–483 BCE)
350 BCE		Pāṇini, labelled as the father of linguistics, a resident of Gandhara, describes the grammar and morphology of Sanskrit in the text Aṣṭādhyāyī. Pāṇini's standardized Sanskrit is known as Classical Sanskrit.
333 BCE		Persian rule in the northwest ends after Darius III is defeated by Alexander the Great, who establishes the Macedonian Empire after inheriting the Persian Achaemenid Empire.
326 BCE		Ambhi king of Takshila surrenders to Alexander.
326 BCE	May	Porus who ruled parts of the Punjab, fought Alexander at the Battle of the Hydaspes.
321 BCE		Maurya Empire is founded by Chandragupta Maurya in Magadha after he defeats the Nanda Empire. Mauryan capital city is Pataliputra (modern Patna in Bihar).
305 BCE		Chandragupta Maurya defeats Seleucus I Nicator of the Seleucid Empire.
304 BCE		Seleucus gives up his territories in the subcontinent (Afghanistan/Baluchistan) to Chandragupta in exchange for 500 elephants. Seleucus offers his daughter in marriage to Chandragupta to seal their friendship.

== Classical India ==
=== 3rd century BCE ===
Year	Date	Event
290–270 BCE		Pingala, ancient Indian mathematician and poet writes the Chandaḥśāstra (also called the Pingala-sutras), which presents the description of a binary numeral system for prosody. He described meters in the form of short and long syllables.
273 BCE		Ashoka the Great regarded as the greatest ancient Indian emperor, grandson of Chandragupta Maurya, ascends as emperor of the Maurya Empire.
266 BCE		Ashoka conquers and unifies most of Indian subcontinent, along with most of Afghanistan and Balochistan.
265 BCE		Kalinga War takes place between Ashoka and the Kingdom of Kalinga.
261 BCE		After conquering Kalinga, Ashoka who recently converted into Buddhism and made it a quasi-official state religion of the Maurya Empire, reportedly regrets what he has done and relinquishes violence.
260 BCE		Ashoka inscribes the Edicts of Ashoka, written down using Brahmi script. The Edicts describe his Buddhist religious views and his commitment to the welfare of his subjects.
232 BCE		Ashoka dies and is succeeded by Kunala.
230 BCE		Simuka declares independence from Mauryan rule and establishes the Satavahana Empire.

=== 2nd century BCE ===
Year	Date	Event
200 BCE		Kuninda Kingdom is established.
200 BCE		Tolkāppiyam describes the grammar and morphology of Tamil; it is the oldest existing Tamil grammar (dates vary between 200 BCE and 100 CE).
200 BCE		Indo-Greek Kingdom (also known as the Yavana Kingdom) is established. It was a Hellenistic-era Greek kingdom covering various parts of Afghanistan and the northwestern regions of the Indian subcontinent (parts of modern-day Pakistan and northwestern India). The kingdom was founded when the Graeco-Bactrian king Demetrius (and later Eucratides) invaded India from Bactria in 200 BCE. During its existence, the kingdom was ruled over by 30 successive kings, with Menander I being the most famous Indo-Greek king.
185 BCE		The Mauryan Empire ends.
165/155 BCE		Menander I becomes the king of the Indo-Greek Kingdom. Menander is noted for having become a patron of and convert to Greco-Buddhism and he is widely regarded as the greatest of the Indo-Greek kings.

=== 1st century BCE ===
Year	Date	Event
100 BCE		Birth of Charaka, ancient Indian physician who writes the Charaka Samhita, an ancient text that describes theories on human body, etiology, symptomology and therapeutics for a wide range of diseases and is based on the Agnivesha Samhitā.
65 BCE		The Pandyan king sends ambassadors to the Greek and Roman lands.
58 BCE		Beginning of Vikram Era.
1 BCE		Fall of the Indo-Greek Kingdom.

=== 1st century ===
Year	Date	Event
35		Western Satraps formed.
68		Establishment of the Kushan Empire by Kujula Kadphises.
79		Gautamiputra Satakarni becomes Satavahana emperor and starts Shalivahana era calendar after defeating Scythian king Maues.
100 or after		Sugar was first produced from sugarcane plants in northern India sometime after the first century.

=== 2nd century ===
Year	Date	Event
113		Vima Kadphises becomes the ruler of the Kushan Empire. He was the Kushan Emperor to first introduce gold coinage, in addition to the existing silver and copper coinage.
127		Kanishka ascends the throne of the Kushan Empire, succeeding Vima Kadphises. Under his reign, the Kushan Empire reached its zenith.

=== 3rd century ===
Year	Date	Event
240		Sri-Gupta starts the Gupta Empire in Magadha, with its capital in Pataliputra
250		The Vakataka Dynasty in the Deccan is formed by Vindyashakti. He rules until 275.
275		The Pallava dynasty is established.
275		Pravarasena ascends the throne of the Vakataka Dynasty, expanding his empire. He was the first Vakataka ruler who called himself a Samrat, or emperor. He is perhaps the only emperor in his dynasty.

=== 4th century ===
Year	Date	Event
320		Chandragupta I ascends the Gupta throne.
335		Samudragupta ascends the Gupta throne and expands the empire.
345		Kadamba Kingdom established by Mayurasharma, Banavasi as its capital and they were the first kingdom to use Kannada in administration.
380		Chandragupta II, Samudragupta's son becomes the Gupta Emperor.
390		Prabhavatigupta, a Gupta Princess who was the daughter of Chandragputa II, becomes the regent of the Vakataka dynasty after the death of her husband Rudrasena II, effectively ruling the Vakatakas until 410.

=== 5th century ===
Year	Date	Event
413		Kumaragupta I adopted the title of Mahendraditya.
455		Skandagupta, faced Hunas effectively.
467		Invasions by the Huna. Pallavas became a major power during the reign of Mahendravarman I (590 – 630 CE).
475		Harishena takes over the Vakataka Dynasty. He was a great patron of Buddhist Art. The World Heritage monument Ajanta Caves is a surviving example of his works.
476		Birth of Aryabhata, ancient Indian mathematician and astronomer who goes on to write the Aryabhatiya, a Sanskrit astronomical treatise and the Arya-siddhanta.

=== 6th century ===
Year	Date	Event
502		Mihirakula becomes the ruler of the Alchon Huns. He was the second and last of the Alchon Huns. He was considered to be an extremely violent and cruel ruler. He destroyed many Buddhist monasteries in his kingdom.
528		Confederation of Indian rulers Yashodharman, Narasimhagupta and Adityavardhana defeat the Huna emperor Mihirakula in the Battle of Sondani.
528–540		Yashodharman conquers vast territories from the Hunas and Guptas after the Battle of Sondani, and establishes the short-lived Aulikara Empire
554		Collapse of Gupta Empire after the death of Vishnugupta.
573		Varāhamihira, ancient Indian astrologer, astronomer, and polymath writes the Pañcasiddhāntikā, a treatise on mathematical astronomy which summarises five earlier astronomical treatises by five authors.

=== 7th century ===
Year	Date	Event
606		Harsha is crowned Monarch of Kannauj.
628		Ancient Indian mathematician and astronomer Brahmagupta completes the Brāhmasphuṭasiddhānta, a text on mathematical astronomy explaining the role of zero, rules for manipulating both negative and positive numbers, a method for computing square roots, methods of solving linear and quadratic equations, and rules for summing series, Brahmagupta's identity, and Brahmagupta's theorem. Brahmagupta described gravity as a force of attraction. He posited that it is the nature of the Earth to attract objects, a significant departure from the Aristotelian view of objects seeking their "natural place".
637		Badami Chalukya power at its peak. Pulakeshin II pushes north up to the Narmada and defeats the invading Harshavardhana of Kanauj.
647		Death of Harsha.
665		Ancient Indian mathematician and astronomer Brahmagupta completes the astronomical treatise Khandakhadyaka covering topics such as the longitudes of the planets, diurnal rotation, lunar and solar eclipses, risings and settings, the moon's crescent and conjunctions of the planets.

== Medieval India ==
=== 8th century ===
Year	Date	Event
700		According to the Qissa-i Sanjan, the immigrants Parsi are granted permission to stay by the local ruler Jadi Rana.
711		Arab commander of the Umayyad Caliphate, Muhammad bin Qasim defeats Raja Dahir, king of Sindh Region in modern-day Pakistan.
728		Narasimhavarman II of the Pallava dynasty constructs the Shore Temple of Mamallapuram.
736		Delhi is re-established by Bilan Deo Tomar also known as Anangpal Tomar.
738		Confederacy of Indian kings consisting of Nagabhata I of Gurjara-Pratihara dynasty and Bappa Rawal, ruler of Mewar defeat Arab Umayyad Caliphate invasion attempts in the Battle of Rajasthan (738 CE)
739		Avanijanashraya Pulakeshin of the Chalukyas of Navasarika kingdom defeats an invasion attempt by the Arab Umayyad Caliphate.
753		Establishment of Rashtrakuta Kingdom of Manyakhet by Dantidurga by defeating Chalukyas of Badami
753		Saindhava naval fleet defeats Arab naval fleet sent by the Arab governor of Sindh.
776		Saindhava naval fleet under Agguka I defeats second Arab naval expedition.
788		Birth of Adi Shankara.

=== 9th century ===
Year	Date	Event
800		Vikramashila University is established by the Pala emperor Dharmapala in present-day Bhagalpur district in Bihar, in early 9th century
814		Nripatunga Amoghavarsha I becomes Rashtrakuta emperor. Kannada literature flourishes.
836		Mihira Bhoja, regarded as the greatest ruler of the Gujara-Pratihara dynasty, he reorganized the empire to its peak.

=== 10th century ===
Year	Date	Event
935		Chandrapur University established in 935 CE by Srichandra,(Jatin korgaonkar) a ruler of the Chandra dynasty.
985		Rajaraja Chola ascends to the throne of Chola empire. He expands the empire to Sri Lanka and to the north to include Kalinga kingdom.
993		Rajaraja Chola invades Sri Lanka, capturing the northern half.

=== 11th century ===
Year	Date	Event
1000		Invasion of Mahmud of Ghazni begins (1000–1025 CE).
1003–1010		The Brihadisvara Temple is built by Raja Raja Chola I.
1014-1025		Rajaraja Chola adds the Lakshadweep and Maldives islands to the Chola empire.
1014-1025		Rajendra Chola I became the king of Chola Empire after his father Rajaraja Chola. During his reign, he extended the influences of the already vast Chola empire up to the banks of the river Ganges in the north and across the ocean. Rajendra's territories extended coastal Burma, the Andaman and Nicobar Islands, Lakshadweep, Maldives, conquered the kings of Srivijaya (Sumatra, Java and Malay Peninsula in South East Asia) and Pegu islands with his fleet of ships. He defeated Mahipala, the Pala king of Bengal and Bihar, and to commemorate his victory he built a new capital called Gangaikonda Cholapuram. The Cholas became one of the most powerful dynasties in Asia during his reign. The Tamil Chola armies exacted tribute from Thailand and the Khmer kingdom of Cambodia. Rajendra Chola I was the first Indian king to take his armies overseas and make conquests of these territories, even though there is epigraphical evidence of Pallava presence in these very areas.
1014		Mahmud Ghazni defeats the Hindu Shahi king Trilochanapala and annexes Punjab. He then attempts to invade Kashmir, but is defeated by Sangramaraja.
1017		al-Biruni travelled to the Indian subcontinent.
1017	26 April	Ramanuja is born at Sriperumbudur, Tamil Nadu.
1021		Mahmud of Ghazni again attempts to invade Kashmir, but is defeated by Samgrāmarāja.
1025	30 April	Last invasion of Mahmud Ghazni, sacked and destroyed temple of Somnath.
1027		The Sun Temple of Modhera is completed by Bhima I of the Chaulukya dynasty
1030	30 April	Death of Mahmud of Ghazni.
1033	15 June	Suhaldev, king of Shravasti defeats and kills Ghazi Saiyyad Salar Masud, nephew of Mahmud of Ghazni.
1035		The Brihadisvara Temple, Gangaikonda Cholapuram is built by Rajendra Chola I.
1058		Soomra dynasty ends the Arab domination and establishes its own rule over Sindh.

=== 12th century ===
Year	Date	Event
1120		Kalyani Chalukyas power at its peak. Vikramaditya VI ushers in Vikrama Chalukya era.
1121		Ajayaraja II, of the Chahamanas of Shakambhari dynasty repulse Ghaznavid invasions.
1134		Life of Basaveshwara, philosopher and social reformer (to 1196).
1149	30 September	Birth of the Great poet and writer of India Chand Baradai in Lahore.
1150		Bhāskara II, mathematician and astronomer writes the Siddhānta Shiromani, consisting of three books Līlāvatī on arithmetic and measurement, Bijaganita on algebra and Gaṇitādhyāya and Golādhyāya on astronomy.
1157		The Kalachuris of Kalyani under Bijjala II capture Kalyani
1175		Muhammad of Ghor invades India.
1178		Forces of the Chaulukya king Mularaja II led by his regent mother Naiki Devi defeat Ghurid invaders led by Muhammad of Ghor who escapes back to Ghazni, in the Battle of Kasahrada.
1191		First Battle of Tarain between Mohammed Ghori and Prithviraj III. Ghori is defeated by Prithivi Raj Chauhan III.
1192		Second Battle of Tarain fought between Muhammed Ghori and Prithviraj Chauhan III. Prithviraj Chauhan III is defeated by Mohammed Ghori.
1193		Muslim general Muhammad bin Bakhtiyar Khalji destroys the ancient university of Vikramashila.
1194		Battle of Chandawar fought between Muhammad of Ghor and Jaichand of Kannauj. Ghori defeated Jayachandra and killed him.

=== 13th century ===
Year	Date	Event
1204		Trailokyavarman, the Chandela ruler defeats the Ghurid Empire in the Battle of Kakadadaha and retakes the Kalinjar Fort. Subsequently he restores and expands Chandela power across much of the former Chandela realm.
1206	15 March	Khokhars killed Muhammad Ghori during a raid on his camp on the Jhelum River, marking the end of 14 years of Ghurid rule over northern India (1192–1206).
1206	25 June	Qutb ud-Din Aibak establishes slave dynasty (Mamluk) later to be known as Delhi Sultanate, beginning 320 years rule over India (1206–1526).
1206		Raja Prithu defeats Muhammad Bakhtiyar Khalji, destroying his army of 12,000 with only about 100 survivors.
1210		Qutb ud-Din Aibak dies while playing polo.
1210		Shams ud-Din Iltutmish, the third ruler of the Delhi Sultanate, belonging to the Mamluk dynasty (slave dynasty), introduced IQTA (tax, revenue) system. Died in 1236.
1211–1215		Anangabhima Deva III of the Eastern Ganga dynasty in present-day Odisha defeats invasions by Ghiyāth ad-Dīn ʿIwaz Khalji the ruler of Bengal.
1221		Genghis Khan invades Punjab in pursuit of the fleeing Khwarezm Shah Jalal al-Din Mangburni and defeats him in the Battle of the Indus.
1226		Raja Prithu repulses invading forces of Ghiyas ud din Balban the ninth sultan of the Mamluk dynasty of Delhi, in present-day Assam
1229		Sandhya (ruler of Kamarupa) in present-day Assam drives Muslims out of his territory and captures territory till Karatoya river. Thereafter, to avenge previous defeats, he invades the western border of Gaur (Lakhnauti) and annexes regions across the Karatoya into his kingdom.
1236		Narasingha Deva I ruler of the Eastern Ganga dynasty in present-day Odisha launches attacks against the Turko-Afghan rulers of Mamluk dynasty in Bengal that had captured Bihar and Bengal and not only repulses their attacks, but pushes them as far back as Padma River in current-day Bangladesh.
1236	10 November	Rule of Razia Sultana; the daughter of Iltutmish.
1238	October	Sri Madhwacharya born in Pajaka near Udupi, Karnataka
1240	14 October	Murder of Razia Sultan by Turkish nobles (Chalisa).
1243		Narasingha Deva I ruler of the Eastern Ganga dynasty defeats Tughral Tughan Khan of the Mamluk Sultanate of Delhi in the Battle of Katasin and annexes several districts of Bengal into his empire.
1246–66		Rule of Nasiruddin Mahmud with support of Balban (Wazir and powerful member of Chalisa). Chalisa- a council of 40 members.
1250		The Konark Sun Temple is completed, built by Narasingha Deva I.
1257		The Kamrup kingdom, led by its ruler Sandhya defeats and executes Malik Ikhtiyaruddin Yuzbak, the Mamluk Governor of Bengal. His domains are split between the Kamrup kingdom and Narasimhadeva I of the Eastern Ganga Empire.
1266–1286		Rule of Balban; Chalisa wiped out.
1267		The Mahanubhava philosophy established by Chakradhar Swami.
1275		Birth of saint Dnyaneshwar.
1290		Murder of Muiz ud din Qaiqabad by Jalaluddin Firuz Khalji, an army commander.
1290–96		Jalal-ud-din Khilji founds the Khiliji Dynasty.

=== 14th century ===
Year	Date	Event
1309		Alauddin Khalji sends Malik Kafur to South. Malik Kafur Lays siege on the Kakatiya dynasty Capital Warangal and Extracts Tribute. The diamond Kohinoor was among the loot collected.
1310		Ala-ud-din Khilji's army under Malik Kafur occupies Devagiri ending the Seuna Yadava Kingdom
1311		Malik Kafur attacks the Hoyasalas. In the aftermath of the destruction Hoyasalas abandon the old capital Halebidu. He later attacks Madurai. The attacks on Warangal, Halebidu and Madurai is accompanied by wide scale killing, destruction of temples and repatriation of wealth back to Delhi.
1323	9 November	Ulugh Khan (Muhammad bin Tughluq) defeats Prataparudra II ending the Kakatiya dynasty.
1333		Prithvi Chand II of the Hindu Katoch kingdom of Kangra defeats the army of Muhammad bin Tughluq who loses nearly all his 10,000 soldiers and is forced to retreat.
1334		Musunuri Kapaya Nayaka with assistance from the Hoysala ruler Veera Ballala III leads a rebellion against the Tughluq rule of Delhi Sultanate, driving it out of Warangal region in present-day Telangana.
1336	18 April	Vijayanagara Empire established by Harihara I and his brother Bukka Raya I.
1336		Rana of Mewar Hammir Singh defeats and captures Tughlaq dynasty ruler Muhammad bin Tughluq in the Battle of Singoli.
1340		Birth of great mathematician Madhava of Sangamagrama who goes on to found the Kerala school of astronomy and mathematics and write the Venvaroha, which describes the methods for the computation of the true positions of the Moon at intervals of about half an hour for various days in an anomalistic cycle.
1343		Veera Ballala III captured and killed in the Battle of Kannanur.
1347		Governor Hasan Gangu revolts against Muhammad bin Tughluq founding the Bahmani Sultanate.
1351		Samma Dynasty assumes rule over Sindh.
1370		Bukka, the Vijayanagara ruler and his son Kumara Kamapna capture the entire Tamil speaking parts.
1398		Sack of Delhi is committed by Timur's invasion. He plunders cities such as Lahore, Tulamba, Multan, and Bhatner.

=== 15th century ===
Year	Date	Event
1401		Dilawar Khan establishes the Malwa Sultanate in present-day northern India.
1407		Zafar Khan: governor of Gujarat, declares himself as Sultan Muzaffar Shah founding the Gujarat Sultanate/Muzaffarid dynasty.
1414		Khizr Khan, deputized by Timur to be the governor of Multan takes over Delhi founding the Sayyid dynasty
1424		Deva Raya II succeeded his father Veera Vijaya Bukka Raya as monarch of the Vijayanagara Empire
1437		Rana Kumbha of Mewar and Rao Ranmal Rathore of Marwar defeat and take prisoner Mahmud Khalji, Sultan of the Malwa Sultanate in the Battle of Sarangpur
1442		Rana Kumbha of Mewar defeats Mahmud Khalji in the Battle of Mandalgarh
1443		Abdur Razzaq visits India.
1446		Rana Kumbha of Mewar defeats Mahmud Khalji in the Battle of Banas
1446		Mallikarjuna Raya succeeds his father Deva Raya II
1449	26 September	Sankardev, founder of Ekasarana Dharma was born in Nagaon, Assam.
1450		Shri Guru Ravidas Ji was born in 1450 in Varanasi. He was an Indian mystic poet-sant of the Bhakti movement during the 15th to 16th century CE. Venerated as a guru in the region of Punjab, Uttar Pradesh, Rajasthan, Maharashtra and Madhya Pradesh, the devotional songs of Ravidas have had a lasting impact upon the bhakti movement.
1451	19 April	Bahlul Khan Lodhi ascends the throne of the Delhi sultanate starting the Lodhi dynasty
1456		Rana Kumbha of Mewar defeats the combined armies of Shams Khan (sultan of Nagaur) and Qutbuddin Ahmad Shah II (Sultan of Gujarat) in the Battle of Nagaur and captures Nagaur, Kasili, Khandela and Shakambhari. Nagaur Sultanate ceases to exist.
1469	15 April	Guru Nanak, the founder of Sikhism, is born.
1474		Rao Jodha defeats Bahlol Khan and Hussian Shah of Jaunpur Sultanat.
1483	14 February	Birth of Babur in Andijan, Fergana Valley in Central Asia.
1485		Saluva Narasimha Deva Raya drives out Praudha Raya ending the Sangama Dynasty.
1486		Advent of Chaitanya Mahaprabhu, founder of Gaudiya Vaishnavism and leader of the world's first civil disobedience movement, in Navadwip, West Bengal.
1490		Ahmadnagar declares independence, followed by Bijapur and Berar in the same year thus breaking up the Bahmani Sultanate.
1492	30 March	Satal Rathore of Marwar kills Afghan warlord Gudhla Khan in the Battle of Peepar, to rescue 140 girls abducted by the Afghans. He later succumbs to injuries sustained in the battle.
1498	20 May	Vasco de Gama was the first portage's sailor first voyage from Portugal to India and back (in 1499).

=== 16th century ===
Year	Date	Event
1503		Kingdom of Cochin is taken over by the Portuguese creating the first European settlement in India.
1508	3 February	The Christian-Islamic power struggle in Europe and the Middle East. Spills over into the Indian Ocean as Battle of Chaul during the Portuguese-Mamluk War.
1509	3 February	Battle of Diu marks the beginning of the dominance of the Europeans in the Asian naval theater.
1518		Kingdom of Mewar under Rana Sanga defeats Lodi Empire under Ibrahim Lodhi in the Battle of Khatoli, gains control over north eastern Rajasthan.
1519		Kingdom of Mewar under Rana Sanga defeats the Malwa Sultanate and the Gujarat Sultanate in the Battle of Gagron, obtains control of Malwa.
1519		The Kingdom of Mewar under Rana Sanga again defeats Lodi Empire under Ibrahim Lodi in the Battle of Dholpur, extends control up to Agra.
1520		Vijayanagara Empire under Krishnadevaraya defeats the Sultanate of Bijapur in the Battle of Raichur.
1520		Rana Sanga leads a coalition of Rajput armies to invade the Gujarat Sultanate, reinstates Raimal as the Rao of Idar. The Sultan of Gujarat is forced to flee to Muhammadabad.
1520		The mystic poet-sant of the Bhakti movement, Shri Guru Ravidas, dies.
1522		The Portuguese land on the Coromandel Coast.
1526	21 April	Sultan Ibrahim Lodi, of the Delhi Sultanate, angers local nobles, who respond by inviting Babur, the Mughal ruler of Kabul, to invade Delhi and Agra. The local population, plus the possession of artillery, assists Babur in killing the Sultan (whose soldiers desert him) at the First Battle of Panipat. Marks the beginning of Mughal Empire.
1527	17 March	Babur defeats Rana Sanga of Mewar in the Battle of Khanwa.
1530		Astronomer-mathematician Jyeṣṭhadeva of the Kerala school of astronomy and mathematics writes the Yuktibhāṣā, a major treatise on mathematics and astronomy in Malayalam.
1530	28 March,27 January	Babur completes his Baburnama, reflecting on society, politics, economics, history, geography, nature, flora and fauna, which to this day is a standard textbook in 25 countries. Babur dies, and is succeeded by his son Humayun.
1532		Ahoms under king Suhungmung defeat Turbak Khan of the Bengal Sultanate in Battle of Hatbor.
1533		Ahoms under king Suhungmung defeat Turbak Khan of the Bengal Sultanate in Battle of Duimunisila.
1539		Battle of Chausa fought between Humayun and Sher Shah Suri in which Humayun is defeated.
1539		Guru Angad Dev becomes second guru of Sikhs.
1540	18 September	Battle of Kannauj fought between Humayun and Sher Shah Suri and Humayun was completely defeated. Humayun lost the Mughal empire to Afghans (Suri Dynasty), and passed 12 years in exile.
1540	9 May	Maharana Pratap Singh of Mewar (son of Maharana Udai Singh II) is born.
1542	15 October	Akbar is born at Umerkot.
1545	22 May	Death of Sher Shah Suri and succeeded by Islam Shah Suri.
1552	26 March	Guru Amar Das becomes third Guru of Sikhs.
1554	22 November	Islam Shah Suri dies.
1555	22 May	Humayun regained the throne of Delhi from the hands of weak successors of Sher Shah after Battle of Sirhind.
1556	27 January	Humayun dies, and is succeeded by his son Akbar.
1556	7 October	Hindu king Hemu defeats Mughal forces in the Battle of Tughlaqabad.
1556	5 November	Hindu king Hemu establishes his raj in North India and bestowed with title of Vikramaditya. He was defeated at the Second Battle of Panipat by Akbar and Bairam Khan's forces.
1565	26 January	Battle of Talikota results in the rout of Vijayanagara Empire.
1568		Paradesi Synagogue, the first Jewish synagogue in India constructed by the Paradesi Jews.
1572		Akbar annexes Gujarat, also shifts the Mughal capital to Fatehpur Sikri where a new township and citadel containing buildings of a unique all-India character—inspired by the architecture of Bengal, Gujarat, Malwa, Kashmir as well as the Timurid world—is born.
1574	1 September	Guru Ram Das becomes fourth Guru of Sikhs.
1574		Akbar annexes Bengal.
1581	1 September	Guru Arjan Dev becomes fifth Guru of Sikhs.
1582		Maharana Pratap defeats Mughal governor in Battle of Dewair in present-day Rajasthan
1586	6 October	Akbar annexes Kashmir.
1589		Harmandir Sahib (Golden Temple) build in Amritsar by Guru Arjan.
1600	31 December	East India Company is formed in England. Gets exclusive trading rights with India.

=== 17th century ===
Year	Date	Event
1602		Dutch came to India at Pulicut (back to 1825).
1605	27 October	Akbar dies, and is succeeded by his son Jahangir.
1606	25 May	Guru Hargobind is selected to becomes the sixth guru of Sikhs by Guru Arjan.
1606	30 May	Guru Arjan is tortured and killed under orders of Mughal Emperor Jahangir for refusing to convert to Islam.
1612	24 August	East India Company enters into a trade agreement with the Mughal Emperor Jahangir.
1616		Susenghphaa, ruler of the Ahom kingdom defeats Mughal forces in a land and naval battle at Bharali, Assam.
1621		Sikhs army led by Guru Hargobind defeat Mughals in the Battle of Rohilla.
1628		Jahangir announces "Chain of Justice" outside his palace that anyone can ring the bell and get a personal hearing with the emperor. Jahangir dies, and is succeeded by his son Shah Jahan.
1630	19 February	Shivaji, future founder of Maratha Empire is born in Shivneri Fort, near Pune.
1634		Sikhs armies led by Guru Hargobind defeat Mughal armies in the Battle of Amritsar (1634) and Battle of Lahira.
1635	25 April	Sikhs army led by Guru Hargobind defeat a Mughal army in the Battle of Kartarpur.
1636		Establishment of Kohra (estate) by Babu Himmat Sah.
1644	8 March	Guru Har Rai becomes seventh guru of Sikhs.
1640		Rani Karnavati of the Garhwal Kingdom repels and defeats invasion attempt by Mughal army of Shah Jahan.
1658		Shah Jahan completes Taj Mahal, Jama Masjid, and Red Fort. Imperial treasuries drained by architectural and military overexpenditures. Shah Jahan put under house arrest, and is succeeded by his son Aurangzeb.
1659	19 February	Shivaji's ill-equipped and small Maratha army defeat numerically much larger Adilshahi troops at the Battle of Pratapgarh marking the first victory of the Maratha Kingdom. Shivaji personally kills Adilshahi commander Afzal Khan (general).
1659	27 December	Marathas under Shivaji defeat the Adilshahi troops in the Battle of Kolhapur.
1660	13 July	Maratha army of 600 defeats a much larger army of the Bijapur Sultanate of 10,000 in the Battle of Pavan Khind, near the city of Kolhapur.
1661	3 February	Marathas under Shivaji defeat Mughal Empire forces in the Battle of Umberkhind.
1661	6 October	Guru Har Krishan becomes eight guru of Sikhs.
1664	6–10 January	Marathas under Shivaji defeat Mughal Empire forces in the Battle of Surat.
1665	13 February	Shivaji conducts a raid on the Portuguese colony in Basrur and gains a large booty which enables him to strengthen the base of his new kingdom by building a strong navy and forts.
1665	20 March	Guru Tegh Bahadur becomes ninth Guru of Sikhs.
1665	11 June	Treaty of Purandar (1665) (or पुरंदर चा तह) was signed between Shivaji and the Rajput ruler Jai Singh I.
1669	28 November	Jats defeats the Mughal Empire in the Battle of Tilpat takes control of Mathura.
1670	4 February	Marathas under Shivaji capture the fort of Sinhagad (then known as Kondhana) from the Mughals in the Battle of Sinhagad.
1671		Ahom kingdom defeats the Mughal Empire in the Battle of Saraighat, takes back control of Guwahati
1671		Chhatrasal revolts against the Mughal Empire with an army of only 5 horsemen and 25 swordsmen. In ten years he conquers a large tract of land between Chitrakoot, Chhatarpur and Panna in the east and Gwalior in the west, and from Kalpi in the north to Sagar, Garhakota, Shahgarh and Damoh in the south.
1672	February	Maratha forces under Prataprao Gujar defeat a Mughal army twice its size in the Battle of Salher.
1674	6 June	Shivaji is crowned Chhatrapati.
1675	6 May	Marathas defeat the Bijapur Sultanate and capture Ponda Fort after the Siege of Ponda.
1675	24 November	Guru Tegh Bahadur, the ninth Guru of Sikhs is tortured and executed in Delhi by the order of Aurangzeb for his support for the Kashmiri Hindus to practice their religion and for refusing to convert to Islam. Guru Gobind Singh becomes tenth Guru of Sikhs.
1680	3 April	Shivaji dies of fever at Raigad.
1680	20 July	Sambhaji becomes 2nd Chhatrapati of the Maratha Kingdom.
1680		Kingdom of Venad defeats the Mughal Empire in the Battle of Manacaud.
1681		Aurangzeb invades the Deccan.
1681	31 January – 2 February	Maratha ruler Sambhaji attacks and sacks the Mughal city Burhanpur.
1682	August	Ahom kingdom defeats the Mughal Empire in the Battle of Itakhuli, takes back control of Kamrup region.
1684		Marathas under Sambhaji repel a Mughal attempt to invade Konkan. Mughals are forced into a slow retreat and suffer great losses.
1687	16 December	Marathas under Sambhaji defeat the Mughal Army in the Battle of Wai. However, Maratha General Hambirrao Mohite is killed.
1688		The Sikandara was plundered by Rajaram Jat. Even the skeleton of Akbar, was taken out and the bones were consumed to flames.
1689	11 March	After being ambushed and captured by the Mughals, Sambhaji is tortured and killed for refusing to convert to Islam. Rajaram I becomes the third Chhatrapati of the Maratha Kingdom.
1689		Rani Keladi Chennamma defeats Mughal army sent by Aurangzeb in pursuit of Rajaram I, who takes refuge in Keladi.
1690		Maratha Kingdom defeats the Mughal Empire in the Battle of Athani.
1691		Joint forces of Bhim Chand (Kahlur) of Bilaspur and Guru Gobind Singh defeat Mughal army in the Battle of Nadaun.
1692	December	Maratha General Santaji Ghorpade defeats Mughal General Alimardan Khan and captures him. Mughal army under Zulfikhar Ali Khan defeated by Santaji and Dhanaji Jadhav and Zulfiquar Khan is forced to sue King Rajaram for peace.
1693	21 November	Maratha General Santaji Ghorpade defeats Mughal General Himmat Khan.
1695	20 November	Maratha General Santaji Ghorpade defeats and kills Mughal General Kasim Khan.
1696		Sikhs under Guru Gobind Singh defeat Mughal forces in the Battle of Guler (1696)
1696	20 November	Danish India (to 1869).
1699	3 October	Guru Gobind Singh, the 10th Guru of Sikhs creates Khalsa, the saint-soldier at Anandpur Sahib, Punjab.

=== 18th century ===
Year	Date	Event
1700		Sikhs army of 1,000 under Guru Gobind Singh defeats Mughal army numbering 10,000 in the Battle of Anandpur (1700)
1700	3 March	Rajaram I dies. The infant Shivaji II becomes the Chhatrapati of the Maratha Kingdom, with his mother Tarabai as the regent. She continues the Maratha battles against the Mughal Empire, leading the Maratha army herself.
1702		Sikhs army under Guru Gobind Singh defeats Mughal army in the Battle of Nirmohgarh (1702).
1707	13 February	Birth of Suraj Mal son of Badan Singh.
1707	3 March	Death of Aurangzeb the Mughal emperor. Marks the end of Mughal territorial expansion over India.
1708	7 October	Guru Gobind Singh is assassinated by Mughals and the Guru Granth Sahib becomes the eternal Guru of the Sikhs.
1710	12 May	Sikh army under Banda Singh Bahadur defeats Mughal Empire in the Battle of Chappar Chiri and establishes Sikh rule from Lahore to Delhi.
1717		Meitei king Pamheipa (Gharib Nawaz (Manipur)) introduces Hinduism as the state religion and changes the name of the kingdom to the Sanskrit Manipur.
1721	March – October	Attingal Outbreak takes place.
1721	13–14 November	The Madras cyclone occurs.
1720		Bajirao I appointed by Shahu as Peshwa (prime minister) who would later expand the Maratha Kingdom.
1724		Meitei king Gharib Nawaz of the Ningthouja dynasty invades Burma.
1728	28 February	Bajirao I defeats the combined forces of the Mughal Empire and the Nizam of Hyderabad in the Battle of Palkhed.
1729	March	Maratha Kingdom under Bajirao defeats the Mughal Empire, in response for an appeal for help from Chhatrasal, ruler of Bundelkhand in the Battle of Bundelkhand.
1731		Maratha Kingdom under Bajirao defeats Mughal Empire and Maratha rebel factions in the Battle of Dabhoi
1737	16 March	Marathas under Bajirao I defeat the Mughal Empire in the Battle of Delhi (1737).
1737	24 December	Marathas defeat a combined army of the Mughal Empire, Nizam of Hyderabad, Nawab of Awadh and Nawabs of Bhopal in the Battle of Bhopal.
1739	17 February – 16 May	Marathas under Bajirao I defeat the Portuguese in the Battle of Vasai, Portuguese army and administration pulled out of Baçaim (Vasai).
1739	March	Nader Shah invades India from Iran. Nader Shah captures and sacks Delhi. Nader loots the Koh-i-Noor and Darya-i-Noor diamonds, alongside gaining the Peacock Throne.
1740	May	Raghoji I Bhonsle of the Maratha Confederacy defeats and kills Dost Ali Khan the Mughal Nawab of Arcot in the Battle of Damalcherry.
1741	26 March	Maratha army defeats the Nawab of Carnatic and captures Trichinopoly after the Siege of Trichinopoly (1741)
1741	10 August	Kingdom of Travancore under Marthanda Varma defeats the Dutch Empire in the Battle of Colachel.
1753	10 May	Jats under Suraj Mal defeat the Mughal Empire in the Capture of Delhi (1753).
1753	15 August	Treaty of Mavelikkara signed between the Kingdom of Travancore and the Dutch East India Company, effectively ending the political and commercial dominance of the Dutch on the Kerala coast and beginning of the end of Dutch influence in India.
1754	20 January – 18 May	Bharatpur State defeat the Marathas in Battle of Kumher.
1756		Black Hole of Calcutta infamous incident where soldiers of East India Company were held hostage in tortuous conditions, later served as a precedent for the Battle of Plassey.
1757	16 January	Maratha Confederacy defeats Durrani Empire in the Battle of Narela.
1757	23 June	British East India Company defeats the Nawab of Bengal in the Battle of Plassey, marking the end of Islamic period of 565 Years over India (1192–1757) & beginning of British conquests in India.
1757	11 August	Maratha Confederacy defeats Rohilla Afghans in the Battle of Delhi (1757), captures Delhi.
1757	12 February	Jats under Suraj Mal defeat Durrani Empire, in the Battle of Bharatpur.
1757		Third Carnatic War.
1758	28 April	Third Carnatic War.
1758	28 April	Maratha Confederacy led by Raghunathrao and Mahadaji Shinde defeats Durrani Empire in the Battle of Attock (1758), captures Attock.
1758	8 May	Maratha Confederacy led by Raghunathrao, Malhar Rao Holkar and Tukoji Rao Holkar defeats Durrani Empire in the Battle of Peshawar (1758), captures Peshawar.
1759		French India (to 1954).
1759		Maratha Confederacy supported by Sikh Sukerchakia Misl defeats Durrani Empire in the Battle of Lahore (1759).
1760	3 January	Marathas comprehensively defeat the Nizam in the Battle of Udgir. Maratha Confederacy reaches its zenith.
1760	22 January	Battle of Wandiwash, British troops beat French.
1761	January	The Marathas are routed in the Third Battle of Panipat on 14 January 1761, by the Afghans led by Ahmad Shah Durrani, also known as Ahmad Shah Abdali. The battle is considered one of the largest battles fought in the 18th century.
1761	12 June	Capture of Agra Fort by the Kingdom of Bharatpur led by king Suraj Mal, defeating the armies of the Mughal Empire and Rohilla Afghans
1761	August	The Sukerchakia Misl of Dal Khalsa (Sikh Empire) defeats the Durrani Empire in the Battle of Sialkot (1761)
1761	September	The Sikh Confederacy defeats the Durrani Empire in the Battle of Gujranwala (1761)
1762	5 January	The Marathas under the leadership of Peshwa Madhavrao defeat the Nizam's forces in the Battle of Uruli
1762	5 February	Vadda Ghalughara, the massacre of 30,000 Sikhs, mostly non-combatants, by the army of Ahmad Shah Durrani
1762	May	Sikh Misls under Jassa Singh Ahluwalia defeat the Durrani Empire in the Battle of Harnaulgarh
1763	10 August	Maratha Confederacy led by Madhavrao I defeats the Nizam of Hyderabad in the Battle of Rakshasbhuvan and gains territory.
1763	25 December	Suraj Mal dies.
1764	26 February	Sikh Misls under Jassa Singh Ahluwalia defeat the Durrani Empire in the Battle of Sirhind (1764) and capture Sirhind
1764	22 October	Battle of Buxar (British victory against allied Mughal, Bengal and Oudh forces)
1765	February	Kingdom of Bharatpur led by king Jawahar Singh defeats the Mughal Empire in the Battle of Delhi (1764)
1767		First Anglo-Mysore War begins, in which Hyder Ali of Mysore defeats the armies of the British East India Company.
1770		Great Bengal famine of 1770, estimated to have caused the deaths of about 10 million people. Warren Hastings's 1772 report estimated that a third of the population in the affected region starved to death. The famine is attributed to failed monsoon and exploitative policies of the East India Company.
1771		Marathas led by Mahadaji Shinde defeat Rohilla Afghans and re-capture Delhi and parts of North India, thus reasserting their supremacy in north India. As revenge for the losses in the Battle of Panipat, the Maratha army devastated Rohilkhand by looting and plundering and also took the members of royal family as captives.
1772	22 May	Ram Mohan Roy Born (to 1833)
1773		Narayanrao Peshwa is murdered by his uncle Raghunathrao's wife in front of Raghunathrao in Shaniwar Wada, Pune.
1773		Regulating Act 1773 is established.
1773		Warren Hastings appointed as first Governor-General of Bengal.
1774		Chief Justice of the Maratha Confederacy, Ram Shastri passes death sentence against the ruling Peshwa Raghunathrao for murdering his nephew.
1775		First Anglo-Maratha War takes place.
1775	June	Alliance of Shekhawat chieftains and Kingdom of Jaipur defeat the Mughal Empire supported by Baloch chieftains in the Battle of Mandan
1779		Maratha sardar Mahadji Shinde routs the East India Company army at the Battle of Wadgaon. War ends with the restoration of status quo as per Treaty of Salbai.
1780		Second Anglo-Mysore War begins.
1781		Maratha Confederacy defeats forces of the British East India Company in the Battle of Bhorghat.
1784		Second Anglo-Mysore War ends with the Treaty of Mangalore.
1784		Captivity of Mangalorean Catholics at Seringapatam, by armies of Tipu Sultan, suffer extreme hardships, torture, death, forcibly converted to Sunni Islam. Of the 60,000–80,000 Christians taken captive, only 15,000–20,000 survive.
1786		District collectors in Bengal were made responsible for settling the revenue and collecting it.
1787		Maratha Confederacy defeats Tipu Sultan, the king of Mysore in the Maratha–Mysore War, resulting in the Treaty of Gajendragad. Tipu Sultan is forced to pay 4.8 million rupees as a war cost to the Marathas, an annual tribute of 1.2 million rupees and return all the territory captured by his father Hyder Ali
1789		Third Anglo-Mysore War begins.
1789		Tipu Sultan invades Malabar (present day Kerala), destroys a number of temples including the temples of Bhagamandala, Payyavoor, Ammakoottam Mahadevi temple and Thrikkadamba Sri.mahavishnu temple. Thousands are killed, women raped and populace forced to convert to Islam,
1790		The Marathas under Holkar and General de Boigne defeat the Rajputs of Jaipur and Mughals at the Battle of Patan, where 3000+ Rajput cavalry is killed and the entire Mughal unit vanquished. The defeat crushes Rajput hope of independence from external influence
1790	May	Kingdom of Travancore defeats the Kingdom of Mysore in the Battle of Nedumkotta
1792		Third Anglo-Mysore War ends.
1793		Birth of Rani Rashmoni, one of the pioneers of the Bengali Renaissance.
1795	11 March	Maratha Confederacy defeats the Nizam of Hyderabad in the Battle of Kharda, Nizam ceded territory.
1795	13 August	Death of Ahilyabai Holkar
1796		Ching-Thang Khomba moves Manipur's capital to Kangla
1798		Fourth Anglo-Mysore War begins.
1799		Fourth Anglo-Mysore War ends with the death of Tipu Sultan, the victory of the East India Company, and the restoration of their ally, the Wodeyar dynasty of Mysore.
1799		Polygar War.
1800	13 March	Death of Nana Fadnavis.

== Modern India ==
=== 19th century ===
Year	Date	Event
1801	12 April	Maharaja Ranjit Singh establishes Khalsa rule of Punjab from Lahore. Khalsa army liberates Kashmiri Pandits and invades Afghanistan via the Khyber Pass.
1802	11 October	The Kingdom of Kottayam defeats the British East India Company in the Battle of Panamarathukotta
1803	11 September	The Second Anglo-Maratha War begins.
1805	24 December	The Second Anglo-Maratha War ends.
1806	10 July	Vellore Mutiny, the first instance of a large-scale and violent mutiny by Indian sepoys against the East India Company.
1807	10 February	Hari Singh Nalwa, commander of the Sikh Khalsa Army of the Sikh Empire defeats the Durrani Empire in the Battle of Kasur, the first in a series of battles.
1809	25 April	The East India Company signs the first Treaty of Amritsar with Ranjit Singh.
1811	28 October	The death of Yashwantrao Holkar.
1813	13 July	Dewan Mokham Chand and Hari Singh Nalwa, commanders of the Sikh Khalsa Army of the Sikh Empire defeat the Durrani Empire in the Battle of Attock and capture Attock
1815	15 January	"Atmiya Sabha" is established by Raja Ram Mohan Roy.
1817	20 January	Establishment of Hindu College (Presidency College, now Presidency University, Kolkata)
1817	13 June	The Third Anglo-Maratha War begins.
1818	March – 2 June	Sikh Empire defeats the Durrani Empire and captures Multan after the Siege of Multan (1818).
1819	3 July	Sikh Empire defeats the Durrani Empire in the Battle of Shopian and captures Srinagar and Kashmir. Islamic rule ends in Jammu and Kashmir.
1819	9 April	The Third Anglo-Maratha War ends with the capture of Asirgarh Fort and the end of the Maratha Confederacy, leaving the East India Company with control of almost the whole of India.
1820	26 September	Ishwar Chandra Vidyasagar is born (to 1891).
1823	14 March	Sikh Empire defeats the Emirate of Afghanistan and the Nawab of Amb to annex Peshawar Valley, in the Battle of Nowshera
1824	12 February	Dayananda Saraswati is born (to 1883)
1824	5 March	First Anglo-Burmese War (to 1826)
1825	December 1825 – January 1826	Battle between East India Company and Bharatpur State
1826	4 January	British rule in Burma (to 1947)
1827	11 April	Jyotirao Phule is born (to 1890)
1828	19 November	Rani of Jhansi was born (to 1858)
1831		Kol uprising
1831	6 May	Sikh Empire defeats the Mujahideen forces of Syed Ahmad Barelvi in the Battle of Balakot
1834	6 May	Sikh Empire defeats the forces of Afghan Durrani Empire in the Capture of Peshawar (1834). Peshawar becomes part of the Sikh Empire.
1836	18 February	Ramakrishna is born (to 1886)
1837	18 February	Hari Singh Nalwa, commander of the Sikh Khalsa Army defeats the Durrani Empire in the Battle of Jamrud and extends the frontier of Sikh Empire to beyond the Indus River right up to the mouth of the Khyber Pass.
1845	11 December	First Anglo-Sikh war (to 1846).
1845	4 November	Vasudev Balwant Phadke is born (to 1883).
1848	22 November	The Sikh Empire under Sher Singh Attariwalla defeats the British East India Company under Sir Hugh Gough in the Battle of Ramnagar
1849	13 January	The Sikh Empire under Sher Singh Attariwalla defeats the British East India Company under Sir Hugh Gough in the Battle of Chillianwala
1853	1 April	The Post Service started.
1853	16 April	The first railway is established between Bombay and Thane.
1855	31 May	Rani Rashmoni complete the Dakshineswar Kali Temple with the installation of Ma Kali.
1855	30 June	Santhal rebellion
1856	25 July	Hindu Widows' Remarriage Act, 1856
1856	23 July	Bal Gangadhar Tilak is born (to 1920)
1856	20 August	Narayana Guru is born (to 1928)
1857	10 May	British victory in Indian Rebellion of 1857. Last Mughal Emperor Bahadur Shah Zafar was deposed by British East India Company and India transferred to British Crown. Marks the End of Mughal Dynasty rule over India.
1857	18 July, 24 January	India's first three modern universities, (University of Mumbai, University of Madras, and the University of Calcutta), are established.
1858	1 November	British Raj (to 1947) Marks the Beginning Of Direct British Rule Over India For 89 Years(1858–1947).
1858	7 November	Bipin Chandra Pal is born (to 1932).
1859	18 April	Death of Tatya Tope.
1861	7 May	Rabindranath Tagore is born.
1862		The high courts of Calcutta, Madras, and Bombay are established.
1863	12 January	Swami Vivekanand is born (to 1902).
1865	28 January	Lala Lajpat Rai is born (to 1928).
1867	31 March	"Prarthana Samaj" established earlier known as "Atmiya Sabha", "Tahzeeb-ul-Akhlaq" was started
1869	2 October	Mahatma Gandhi is born (to 30 January 1948)
1869	29 November	Thakkar Bapa is born (to 1951).
1873	24 September	Jyotirao Phule establishes the Satyashodhak Samaj society.
1875	May–June	Deccan Riots.
1875	10 April	"Arya Samaj" is established.
1875		Aligarh Muslim University
1876	25 December	Muhammad Ali Jinnah was born (1876–1948)
1877	1 January	The first Delhi Durbar
1883	30 October	Maharishi Dayanand Saraswati dies.
1885	28 December	The Indian National Congress is established
1889	14 November	Jawaharlal Nehru is born (to 1964).
1889	3 December	Khudiram Bose is born (to 1908).
1891	14 April	B. R. Ambedkar is born (to 1956).
1891	31 March	Anglo-Manipur War.
1895	11 May	Jiddu Krishnamurti is born (to 17 February 1986).
1897	23 January	Subhas Chandra Bose is born (to 1945); the first fingerprint bureau of India is established in Calcutta.
1897	11 June	Ram Prasad Bismil is born.
1897	22 June	Chapekar brothers assassinates W.C. Rand.

=== 20th century ===
Year	Date	Event
1900	3 March	Maghfoor Ahmad Ajazi is born (to 1966).
1902		Anushilan Samiti, revolutionary association formed.
1903	11 December	British expedition to Tibet.
1903	1 January	Delhi Durbar Second Time.
1904	5 November	University Act established.
1905		Bharat Sevak Samaj founded by Gopal Krishna Gokhale.
1905	16 October	Partition of Bengal (1905).
1906	April	Jugantar formed.
1906	30 December	All-India Muslim League formed in Dacca.
1907		Surat Split.
1908	May	Alipore bomb case takes place.
1909	25 May	Indian Councils Act 1909 is enacted.
1911		Cancellation of Partition of Bengal.
1911	December	Delhi Durbar Third Time.
1911	12 December	The British government moves the capital from Calcutta to Delhi.
1912	December	Delhi conspiracy case.
1913	15 July	Gadar Party formed.
1913		Rabindranath Tagore won Nobel Prize in Literature
1914	26 August	Rodda company arms heist, in which members of Bengali revolutionary organisation Anushilan Samiti intercept and make away with a shipment of Mauser Pistols and ammunition. In the following years, these pistols and ammunitions were linked to almost all the instances of nationalist struggles in Bengal.
1914		Hindu–German Conspiracy takes place.
1915		Ghadar conspiracy.
1915	1 December	Provisional Government of India formed in Kabul.
1915		Mahatma Gandhi returns to India.
1916	29 December	Lucknow Pact.
1917		Champaran Satyagraha and Kheda Satyagraha.
1917		Justice Party (India) is founded.
1918		Kheda Satyagraha and Ahmedabad Mill Strike.
1919	13 April	Jallianwala Bagh massacre takes place.
1919		Montagu–Chelmsford Reforms.
1919	18 March	Rowlatt Act is passed.
1919	23 December	Government of India Act 1919 introduces a system of diarchy
1920		Non-cooperation movement and Khilafat Movement.
1922	5 February	Chauri Chaura incident.
1924	October	The Hindustan Socialist Republican Association is formed.
1925	9 August	Kakori conspiracy.
1925	27 September	Rashtriya Swayamsevak Sangh (RSS) is founded.
1927	20 March	Mahad Satyagraha.
1927	November	Simon Commission.
1928		Bardoli Satyagraha.
1929		Central Assembly bombed by Bhagat Singh and Batukeshwar Dutt.
1929		Purna Swaraj resolution.
1930		Salt Satyagraha, the civil disobedience movement, begins with the Dandi march.
1930		The first Round Table Conferences (India)
1931	March	Gandhi–Irwin Pact.
1931	23 March	Bhagat Singh, Rajguru and Sukhdev martyred
1931	September–December	The second Round Table Conferences (India).
1932	24 September	Poona Pact established.
1932	16 August	Communal Award.
1932	November–December	The third Round Table Conferences (India).
1935	August	Government of India Act 1935 is passed.
1937		1937 Indian provincial elections.
1939		The All India Forward Bloc established by Subhas Chandra Bose
1940	23 March	Lahore Resolution.
1940		The All-India Jamhur Muslim League established by Maghfoor Ahmad Ajazi to support a united India
1940	8 August	August Offer.
1942	late March	Cripps Mission follows.
1942	August	Quit India Movement is established and the Indian National Army is established by Subhas Chandra Bose.
1943		Arzi Hukumat-e-Azad Hind, the Provisional Government of Free India is formed by Netaji.
1944		Subhas Chandra Bose calls Mahatma Gandhi the "Father of the Nation."
1945	18 August	Subhas Chandra Bose dies in a plane crash at Taiwan.
1945		Wavell Plan, Simla Conference.
1946	February	Royal Indian Navy mutiny happens.
1946	March	Cabinet Mission.
1946	16 August	Direct Action Day/Great Calcutta Killings.
1946	October–November	Noakhali riots takes place.
1947	July	Indian Independence Act 1947 by British Raj.
1947	14 August	Partition of India and Pakistan becomes an independent state.
1947	15 August	Indian independence from the British Raj.
1947	22 October	Pakistan starts the Indo-Pakistani war of 1947–1948 a few weeks after its independence by launching tribal lashkar (militias) from Waziristan supported by irregular Pakistani forces, in an effort to capture Kashmir.
1947	7 November	Battle of Shalateng is fought on the outskirts of Srinagar, where on the advance of the tribal lashkar and Pakistani irregulars is halted and a counter-attack begins to push them back.
1947		Hundreds of thousands die in widespread communal bloodshed after partition, continuing to 1948.
1948	30 January	Mahatma Gandhi is assassinated by Nathuram Godse.
1948		War with Pakistan over disputed territory of Kashmir.
1948		Telangana and other princely states are integrated into Indian union.
1950	26 January	India officially becomes a republic.
1951		Reconstruction of the Somnath temple under the orders of the Home Minister of India Vallabhbhai Patel.
1951		Congress Party wins first general elections under leadership of Jawaharlal Nehru (to 1952).
1955		Nationalisation of the Indian insurance sector.
1956	1 September	Establishment of LIC.
1956	14 October	B. R. Ambedkar converted to Buddhism along with 600,000 followers.
1956	6 December	B. R. Ambedkar died. States Reorganization Act in force from 1 November.
1962		War over disputed territory of Kashmir with China.
1962		India seizes Diu, Daman and Goa from Portuguese India.
1964	27 May	Death of Prime Minister Jawaharlal Nehru.
1965	6–23 September	Second war with Pakistan over Kashmir.
1966	11 January	Prime Minister Lal Bahadur Shastri's mysterious death in Tashkent.
1966	24 January	Nehru's daughter Indira Gandhi becomes prime minister.
1969	19 July	Nationalisation of 14 major private Banks.
1969	15 August	Indian Space Research Organisation formed under Department of Space.
1971	3–16 December	Third war with Pakistan, culminating in the creation of Bangladesh.
1971		Twenty-year treaty of friendship signed with Soviet Union.
1974	18 May	The Smiling Buddha is the first nuclear device in underground test.
1975	15 May	Sikkim becomes part of Indian Union after a referendum in the Sikkim Assembly.
1975	25 June	Indira Gandhi declares a state of emergency after being found guilty of electoral malpractice. Nearly 1,000 political opponents imprisoned and programme of compulsory birth control introduced. (to 1977)
1977		Indira Gandhi's Congress Party loses general elections. Janata Party comes to power. The Communist Party of India (Marxist) comes into power in West Bengal.
1979		The Janata Party splits. Chaudhary Charan Singh becomes Prime Minister.
1980		Indira Gandhi returns to power heading the Congress party splinter group, Congress (Indira).
1983		N. T. Rama Rao NTR's nine-month-old Telugu Desam assumes power in AP becoming a challenger post Loknayak Jayprakash Narayan against Indira Gandhi.
1983		India won World Cup for the first time, in one day international Cricket led by Kapil Dev.
1984		Troops storm Golden Temple, the Sikhs' most holy shrine, after Jarnail Singh Bhindranwale seeks refuge inside. There are a movement to flush out Sikh separatism and calls for secularism, called Operation Blue Star. "Anti-Sikh Riots 1984".
1984		Indira Gandhi is assassinated by her bodyguards; her son, Rajiv, takes over.
1984		Many Sikhs were killed due to the assassination of Indira Gandhi. see 1984 anti-Sikh riots.
1987		India deploys troops for peacekeeping operation in Sri Lanka's ethnic conflict.
1988		SEBI was established by The Government of India on 12 April 1988 and given statutory powers in 1992 with SEBI Act 1992 being passed by the Indian Parliament.
1989		Falling public support leads to a Congress defeat in general election.
1989		The National Front (India), headed by V. P. Singh and led by Janata Dal, is formed and storms into power with outside support from BJP and CPI(M).
1990		Muslim separatist groups begin campaign of violence against Hindus in Kashmir resulting in Exodus of Kashmiri Hindus.
1991	21 May	Rajiv Gandhi is assassinated by a suicide bomber sympathetic to Sri Lanka's Tamil Tigers.
1991		An economic reform programme or Economic liberalisation in India is begun by Prime Minister P. V. Narasimha Rao.
1992	6 December	The demolition of the Babri Masjid, triggering the Bombay riots.
1992	May	Over 200 people die in Cuttack in Odisha, after drinking illegally brewed liquor in the 1992 Odisha liquor deaths incident.
1995	July	West Bengal Chief Minister Jyoti Basu made the first call from Kolkata to inaugurate the cellular services in India.
1996		Congress suffers its worst electoral defeat ever as BJP emerges as the largest single party.
1996	August	The Amarnath Yatra tragedy in which at least 194 pilgrims are reported to have frozen to death in northern Kashmir after being stranded by violent rain and snow storms.
1998		BJP forms coalition government under Prime Minister Atal Bihari Vajpayee.
1998		India and Pakistan carry out nuclear tests, leading to widespread international condemnation.
1999	February	Vajpayee makes a historic bus trip to Pakistan to meet Premier Nawaz Sharif and to sign bilateral Lahore peace declaration.
1999	May	Indian Army launches operations to evict Pakistani forces capturing Indian positions on the icy heights in Kargil district, known as the Kargil War.
1999	October	The Cyclone devastates eastern state of Odisha, leaving at least 10,000 dead.
2000	March	US President Bill Clinton makes a groundbreaking visit to improve ties.
2000	May	India marks the birth of its billionth citizen.
2000	15 November	The states of Jharkhand, Chhattisgarh and Uttarakhand were created.

=== 21st century ===
Year	Date	Event
2001	26 January	The 7.7 M_{w} Gujarat earthquake shakes Western India with a maximum Mercalli intensity of X (Extreme), leaving 13,805–20,023 dead and about 166,800 injured.
2001	July	Vajpayee meets Pakistani President Pervez Musharraf in the first summit between the two neighbours in more than two years. The meeting ends without a breakthrough or even a joint statement because of differences over Kashmir.
2001	July	Vajpayee's BJP party declines his offer to resign over a number of political scandals and the apparent failure of his talks with Pakistani President Musharraf.
2001	September	US lifts sanctions which it imposed against India and Pakistan after they staged nuclear tests in 1998. The move is seen as a reward for their support for the US-led anti-terror campaign.
2001	October	India and Pakistan fire at each other's military posts in the heaviest firing along the dividing line of control in Kashmir for almost a year.
2001	October	Pakistani forces shelled the village of Arnia about three km (two miles) from the border in the early hours of Monday 6 June, killing five and wounding at least two dozen civilians.
2001	13 December	Terrorist attack on Indian parliament in New Delhi, killing several police. The five gunmen are killed in the assault.
2001	December	India imposes sanctions against Pakistan, to force it to take action against two Kashmir militant groups blamed for the suicide attack on parliament. Pakistan retaliates with similar sanctions, and bans the groups in January.
2001	December	Indian and Pakistani mass troops on common border amid mounting fears of a looming war.
2002	January	India successfully test-fires a nuclear-capable ballistic missile – the Agni – off its eastern coast.
2002	February	Inter-religious bloodshed breaks out after 59 Hindu pilgrims returning from Ayodhya are killed in a train fire in Godhra, Gujarat. More than 1,000 people, die in subsequent riots. (Police and officials blamed the fire on a Muslim mob; a 2005 government investigation said it was an accident, though later court and SIT report held Muslim mob responsible.)
2002	May	Pakistan test-fires three medium-range surface-to-surface Ghauri missiles, which are capable of carrying nuclear warheads.
2002	June	The UK and US urge their citizens to leave India and Pakistan, while maintaining diplomatic offensive to avert war.
2002	July	Retired scientist and architect of India's missile programme A. P. J. Abdul Kalam is elected president.
2003	August	Two simultaneous bomb blasts in Bombay, in which over 50 people are killed in, by Pakistan-based Lashkar-e-Taiba.
2003	November	India matches Pakistan's declaration of a Kashmir ceasefire.
2003	December	India, Pakistan agree to resume direct air links and to allow overflights.
2004	January	Groundbreaking meeting is held between government and moderate Kashmir separatists.
2004	May	Surprise victory for Congress Party in general elections. Manmohan Singh is sworn in as prime minister.
2004	September	India, along with Brazil, Germany and Japan, launches an application for a permanent seat on the UN Security Council.
2004	November	India begins to withdraw some of its troops from Kashmir.
2004	December	Thousands are killed when tsunami, caused by the 2004 Indian Ocean earthquake off the Indonesian coast, devastate coastal communities in the south and in the Andaman and Nicobar Islands.
2005	July	More than 1,000 people are killed in floods and landslides caused by monsoon rains in Mumbai (Bombay) and Maharashtra region.
2005	8 October	The 7.6 M_{w} Kashmir earthquake strikes with a maximum Mercalli intensity of VIII (Severe), leaving 86,000–87,351 people dead, 69,000–75,266 injured, and 2.8 million homeless.
2006	February	India's largest-ever rural jobs scheme is launched, aimed at lifting around 60 million families out of poverty.
2006	March	US and India sign a nuclear agreement during a visit by US President George W. Bush. The US gives India access to civilian nuclear technology while India agrees to greater scrutiny for its nuclear programme.
2007	February	India and Pakistan sign an agreement aimed at reducing the risk of accidental nuclear war.
2007	18 February	68 passengers, most of them Pakistanis, are killed by bomb blasts and a blaze on a train travelling from New Delhi to the Pakistani city of Lahore.
2007	March	Maoist rebels in Chhattisgarh state kill more than 50 policemen in a dawn attack.
2007	April	India's first commercial space rocket is launched, carrying an Indian satellite.
2007	May	Government announces its strongest economic growth figures for 20 years – 9.4% in the year to March.
2007	May	At least nine people are killed in a bomb explosion at the main mosque in Hyderabad. Several others are killed in subsequent rioting.
2007	July	India says the number of its people with HIV or AIDS is about half of earlier official tallies. Health ministry figures put the total at between 2 million and 3.1 million cases, compared with previous estimates of more than 5 million.
2007	25 July	Pratibha Patil becomes first woman to be elected president of India.
2008	July	Series of explosions kills 49 in Ahmedabad, in Gujarat state. The little-known terrorist group Indian Mujahideen claims responsibility.
2008	October	Following approval by the US Congress, President George W. Bush signs into law a nuclear deal with India, which ends a three-decade ban on US nuclear trade with Delhi.
2008	22 October	India successfully launches its first mission to the moon, the uncrewed lunar probe Chandrayaan-1.
2008	26–29 November	The 2008 Mumbai attacks (often called the 26/11 attacks) kill 174 people, including 9 of the 10 terrorists from Lashkar-e-Taiba, an Islamic terrorist organisation based in Pakistan. India decides not to attack Pakistan in retaliation.
2008	December	India announces "pause" in peace process with Pakistan. Indian cricket team cancels planned tour of Pakistan.
2009	February	India and Russia sign deals worth $700 million, according to which Moscow will supply Uranium to Delhi.
2009	May	Resounding general election victory gives governing Congress-led alliance of PM Manmohan Singh an enhanced position in parliament, only 11 seats short of an absolute majority.
2009	July	Delhi court decriminalizes gay sex.
2010	13 February	16 people are killed in a bomb explosion at German Bakery in the city of Pune, Maharashtra.
2011	2 April	India wins cricket world cup after 28 years under the captaincy of MS Dhoni.
2011	13 May	After 34 years of Left Front Government, Trinamool Congress and Congress alliance come to power in West Bengal.
2012	25 July	Pranab Mukherjee, the former Finance Minister is elected as the 13th president of India.
2013	12 February	Indian helicopter bribery scandal comes to light.
2013	21 February	Terror attacks in Hyderabad in Dilsukhnagar area.
2013	5 November	Mars Orbiter Mission, is successfully launched into Mars orbit by the Indian Space Research Organisation (ISRO).
2014	16 May	Narendra Modi elected as prime minister of India, Congress was routed in the general elections.
2014	2 June	Telangana, The state of Telangana was officially formed on 2 June 2014.
2015	21 June	The first International Yoga Day was held.
2016	2–5 January	Terror Attacks on Pathankot Air Base.
2016	27 June	India becomes a member of Missile Technology Control Regime.
2016	23 September	India signs a billion-dollar defence deal with France to buy 36 Rafale fighter jets.
2016	27 September	India launches its first space laboratory, AstroSat, in its biggest project since its Mars orbiter mission in 2014.
2016	28 September	India conducted Surgical Strike in response to Uri attack on army base on September 18, 2016
2016	8 November	In a surprise announcement, the government withdraws high denomination notes from circulation causing chaotic scenes at banks across the country as customers try to exchange old notes.
2017	30 June	The Goods and Services Tax (GST) launched, the biggest tax reform in history of India.
2019	14 February	A convoy of vehicles carrying Central Reserve Police Force (CRPF) personnel on the Jammu–Srinagar National Highway was attacked by a vehicle-borne suicide bomber in the Pulwama district, Jammu and Kashmir, India.
2019	26 February	The 2019 Balakot airstrike was conducted by India, when Indian warplanes crossed the de facto border in the disputed region of Kashmir, and dropped bombs in the vicinity of the town of Balakot in Khyber Pakhtunkhwa province in Pakistan.
2019	27 February	The 2019 Balakot strike from Indian side was given a reply named "Swift Retort". After a dog fight between Pakistani and Indian Fighter Pilots. Indian Wing Commander Abhinandan Varthaman was captured by the Pakistani side. However acting to the pressure of various global leaders and bound by the Vienna Convention. Pakistan was Forced to release the Indian Pilot with all due respect.
2019	22 May	2019 Indian general election, Narendra Modi is re-elected as the Prime Minister of India.
2019	5 August	The state of Jammu and Kashmir divided into two separate union territories known as Jammu Kashmir and Ladakh by scrapping of Article 370 of the Constitution of India.
2019	11 December	The Citizenship (Amendment) Act, 2019 was passed by the Parliament of India on 11 December 2019. It amended the Citizenship Act of 1955 by providing a path to Indian citizenship for members of Hindu, Sikh, Buddhist, Jain, Parsi, and Christian religious minorities, who had fled persecution from Pakistan, Bangladesh and Afghanistan before December 2014.
2020	30 January	The first COVID-19 case of the country was reported in Kerala's Thrissur district.
2021	12 May	COVID-19 pandemic in India, with an official death toll of 533,847.
2022	18 July	Droupadi Murmu is elected as President of India, making her the first tribal woman and youngest person to the office.
2022	30 October	The collapse of a suspension bridge in Gujarat, leaves at least 135 dead.
2023	2 June	A train collision in Odisha results in at least 296 deaths and more than 1,200 others injured.
2023	3 July	Indian oil refiners start payments for Russian oil imports in Chinese yuan as an alternative to the US dollar due to increasing sanctions against Russia.
2023	23 August	Chandrayaan-3 becomes the first spacecraft to land near the lunar south pole, carrying a lunar lander named Vikram and a lunar rover named Pragyan.
2023	2 September	The Indian Space Research Organisation (ISRO) successfully launches Aditya-L1, India's first solar observation mission.
2024	June	2024 Indian general election, Narendra Modi elected as Prime Minister for third term.
2025	13 January	The 45-day 2025 Prayag Maha Kumbh Mela held, with over 660 million (66 crore) devotees coming to Prayagraj to participate in the bathing rituals at the sacred confluence of the Ganga, Yamuna, and the mythical Saraswati rivers.
2025	22 April	Terror attack in Pahalgam, Kashmir. Terrorists open fire on tourists, killing 26 and injuring 20. India blames the attack on Pakistan based terrorists, and the Pakistan government for supporting and enabling them.
2025	6-7 May	India launches precision missile strikes named Operation Sindoor on 9 terrorist hideouts in Pakistan and Azad Jammu and Kashmir, as a punitive retaliation for the Pahalgam attack.
2026	27 January	The India-European Union Free Trade Agreement is announced in New Delhi.

== See also ==
- Chronology of Tamil history
- Hindu units of time
- Sikh gurus (1469–1666)
- Tamil units of measurement
- Timeline of Ahmedabad
- Timeline of Ayyavazhi history
- History of Hinduism
- Timeline of Buddhism (563 BCE – present)
- Timeline of Jainism
- Timeline of Mumbai
- Timeline of South Asian history

== Bibliography ==
- Wright, Rita P. (2009), The Ancient Indus: Urbanism, Economy, and Society, Cambridge University Press, ISBN 978-0-521-57219-4
