= 1513 in India =

- Centuries: 15th; 16th; 17th; 18th
- Decades: 1500s; 1510s; 1520s; 1530s
- See also: List of years in India; Timeline of Indian history

Events from the year 1513 in India.

== Events ==
- Bakht Mal becomes king of Nurpur, succeeding Bhil Pal on the latter's death (reigns until 1557 or 1558)
- Construction of Jama Masjid, Champaner begins
- Jain temples are built at Achalgarh Fort

== Births ==
- Jiva Goswami, writer of philosophical works on the theology and practice of Bhakti yoga, Vaishnava Vedanta and associated disciplines is born in Ramakeli in the district of Maldah, West Bengal (dies 1596 or 1598)

== Deaths ==
- Bhil Pal, king of Nurpur (born 1473)

== See also ==
- Timeline of Indian history
