= Bakht Mal =

Raja Bakht-Mal Pathania (1513–1558) was a King of Nurpur, who succeeded Raja Bhil Pal in 1513 who was in good terms with the Lodi dynasty of Delhi. During the conquest of India by Babar in 1526 the Nurpur kingdom became an ally to Babur's conquest. Later, on the flight of Babar's son Humayun in 1540 and the accession of Sher Shah Suri at Delhi, Bakht-Mal switched sides to the Sur dynasty.

The Tarikh-i-Daudi says that the famous fortress of Maukot was erected in the Nurpur kingdom by Islam Shah Suri (1545–53) or it was fortified. It was nearest to the plains, almost halfway to Nurpur from Pathankot, situated on a low hill of Shiwalik range running east to the Chakki river. It was an enclosure surrounded by dense forests, a castle of great strength. It was a legend in its times, a saying was in vogue: Mau Ki Muhim Yaro Maut Ki Nishani Hai, 'The expedition to Mau, friends is a call to death'.

Islam Shah Suri had a narrow escape in an assassination attempt at Maukot. While ascending the hill via a narrow path, a man suddenly rushed upon him with a drawn sword, but he was cut down. It was then discovered that the sword had been presented some time before to one of his own officers. The fort of Maukot is frequently referred to by the Muslim historians, and figures prominently in the history of the Pathania Rajputs till the time of Shahjahan, when it was completely demolished because of the threat it imposed on the Mughals.

In 1553, Mirza Kamran, younger brother of Humayun, on being driven out of Kabul retired to India and sought an asylum with Islam Shah Sur. He was detained as a prisoner but succeeded in making his escape and fled to Raja Bakht-Mal. He made his way to Maukot in disguise, there he found himself in danger and escaped to the Gakhars, by whom he was surrendered to Humayun and blinded.

Sikandar Shah Suri after being driven out of Delhi took refuge in the fortress of Maukot. Bakht-Mal was always in good terms with the Sur dynasty therefore he supported him and defended Maukot, which was besieged by the Mughals for six months. On surrender of the fort in July 1557, Sikandar Shah Suri was permitted to retire to Bengal where a Jagir was assigned to him.

A passage in the Maasir-ul-Umara says that after the capture of Sikandar Shah Suri, Raja Bakht-Mal was captured and taken to the fort of Lahore where he was killed by Bairam Khan. After his death, his brother, Pahari-Mal ascended on the throne in 1557. Bairam Khan took some of their area Rey Shikargah then part of Nurpur kingdom and raised his special army.
