= 1520 in India =

- Centuries: 15th; 16th; 17th; 18th
- Decades: 1500s; 1510s; 1520s; 1530s; 1540s
- See also: List of years in India; Timeline of Indian history

Events from the year 1520 in India.

== Events ==
19 May – The Battle of Raichur is fought.

== Births ==
- Francisco Barreto, later viceroy of Portuguese India is born in Faro (dies 1558)
- Appayya Dikshitar, performer of yajñas is born at Adayapalam, in the Tiruvannamalai district (dies 1593)

== See also ==
- Timeline of Indian history
