= 1523 in India =

- Centuries: 15th; 16th; 17th; 18th
- Decades: 1500s; 1510s; 1520s; 1530s; 1540s
- See also: List of years in India; Timeline of Indian history

Events from the year 1523 in India.

== Incumbents ==
- Governor of Portuguese India Duarte de Menezes

== Events ==
- Santhome Church established in Chennai
- Portuguese settlement of São Tomé de Meliapore(presently Santhome) is established near Madras(Chennai), São Tomé de Meliapore

== Deaths ==
- Chandan of Kamata, first king of the Kamata-Koch kingdom dies (born 1483)

== See also ==
- Timeline of Indian history
