= Agahar =

Village in Himachal Pradesh, India

Aghar
- Village
- Location in Himachal Pradesh, India
- Coordinates: 31.987°N 75.857°E
- Country: India
- State: Himachal Pradesh
- District: Kangra

Area
  - Total: 10 km^{2} (3.9 sq mi)
- Elevation: 326 m (1,070 ft)

Population (2011)
  - Total: 829
  - Density: 83/km^{2} (210/sq mi)

Languages
  - Official: Hindi
- Time zone: UTC+5:30 (IST)
- PIN: 176058
- Telephone code: 01893
- Vehicle registration: HP-88

Agahar is a small village in the chamba District of Himachal Pradesh, with a population of 829 people. It is located near Jhumar and 24 km from Chamba township. It comes under Baat panchayat of Rey Khas.
