= 1521 in India =

- Centuries: 15th; 16th; 17th; 18th
- Decades: 1500s; 1510s; 1520s; 1530s; 1540s
- See also: List of years in India; Timeline of Indian history

Events from the year 1521 in India.

== Events ==
- Duarte de Menezes becomes governor of Portuguese India (until 1524)

== See also ==
- Timeline of Indian history
