= 1518 in India =

- Centuries: 16th; 17th; 18th
- Decades: 1500s; 1510s; 1520s; 1530s
- See also: List of years in India; Timeline of Indian history

Events from the year 1518 in India.

== Events ==
- Lopo Soares de Albergaria ceases his governorship of Portuguese India (commenced 1515)
- Diogo Lopes de Sequeira becomes governor of Portuguese India (and continues until 1522)

== Births ==
- Ibrahim Quli Qutb Shah Wali, later ruler of Golkonda was born (died in 1580)

== Deaths ==
- Kabir, a mystic poet dies (born in 1440)

== See also ==
- Timeline of Indian history
