= 1524 in India =

- Centuries: 15th; 16th; 17th; 18th
- Decades: 1500s; 1510s; 1520s; 1530s; 1540s
- See also: List of years in India; Timeline of Indian history

Events from the year 1524 in India.

== Events ==
- Duarte de Menezes finishes his governorship of Portuguese India (since 1522)
- Vasco da Gama begins and end his governorship of Portuguese India (September to December)

== Births ==
- 5 October – Rani Durgavati (died 1564)

== Deaths ==
24 December - Vasco da Gama, aged 55, Portuguese navigator died at Kochi.

== See also ==
- Timeline of Indian history
