= 1519 in India =

- Centuries: 15th; 16th; 17th; 18th
- Decades: 1500s; 1510s; 1520s; 1530s
- See also: List of years in India; Timeline of Indian history

Events from the year 1519 in India.

== Events ==
- Nasiruddin Nasrat Shah become ruler of the Sultanate of Bengal following his father's (Alauddin Husain Shah) death

== Births ==
- Hindal Mirza Mughal prince and youngest son of Emperor Babur is born (dies 1551)

== Deaths ==
- Alauddin Husain Shah, sultan of Bengal

== See also ==
- Timeline of Indian history
