= 1522 in India =

- Centuries: 16th; 17th; 18th
- Decades: 1500s; 1510s; 1520s; 1530s; 1540s
- See also: List of years in India; Timeline of Indian history

Events from the year 1522 in India.

== Events ==
- 22 January – Duarte de Menezes becomes governor of Portuguese India (until 1524)
- The Portuguese arrive in Chennai and made a port named São Tomé after the Christian apostle, St. Thomas.

== Births ==
- 4 August – Maharana Udai Singh, king of Mewar and the founder of the city of Udaipur, (died 1572)

== See also ==
- Timeline of Indian history
