= 1515 in India =

- Centuries: 15th; 16th; 17th; 18th
- Decades: 1500s; 1510s; 1520s; 1530s
- See also: List of years in India; Timeline of Indian history

Events from the year 1515 in India.

== Events ==
- Phyang Monastery established in Leh district.
- Afonso de Albuquerque dies and so ceases his governorship of Portuguese India (commenced 1509)
- Lopo Soares de Albergaria becomes governor of Portuguese India (and continues until 1518)

== Deaths ==
- 16 December - Afonso de Albuquerque

== See also ==
- Timeline of Indian history
