= 1627 in India =

- Centuries: 15th; 16th; 17th; 18th; 19th
- Decades: 1600s; 1610s; 1620s; 1630s; 1640s
- See also: List of years in India; Timeline of Indian history

This is a list of events in India in year 1627.

== Events ==
- Mohammed Adil Shah becomes Ruler of Bijapur, Karnataka following the death of Ibrahim Adil Shah II.
- Gol Gumbaz, Karnataka begins.
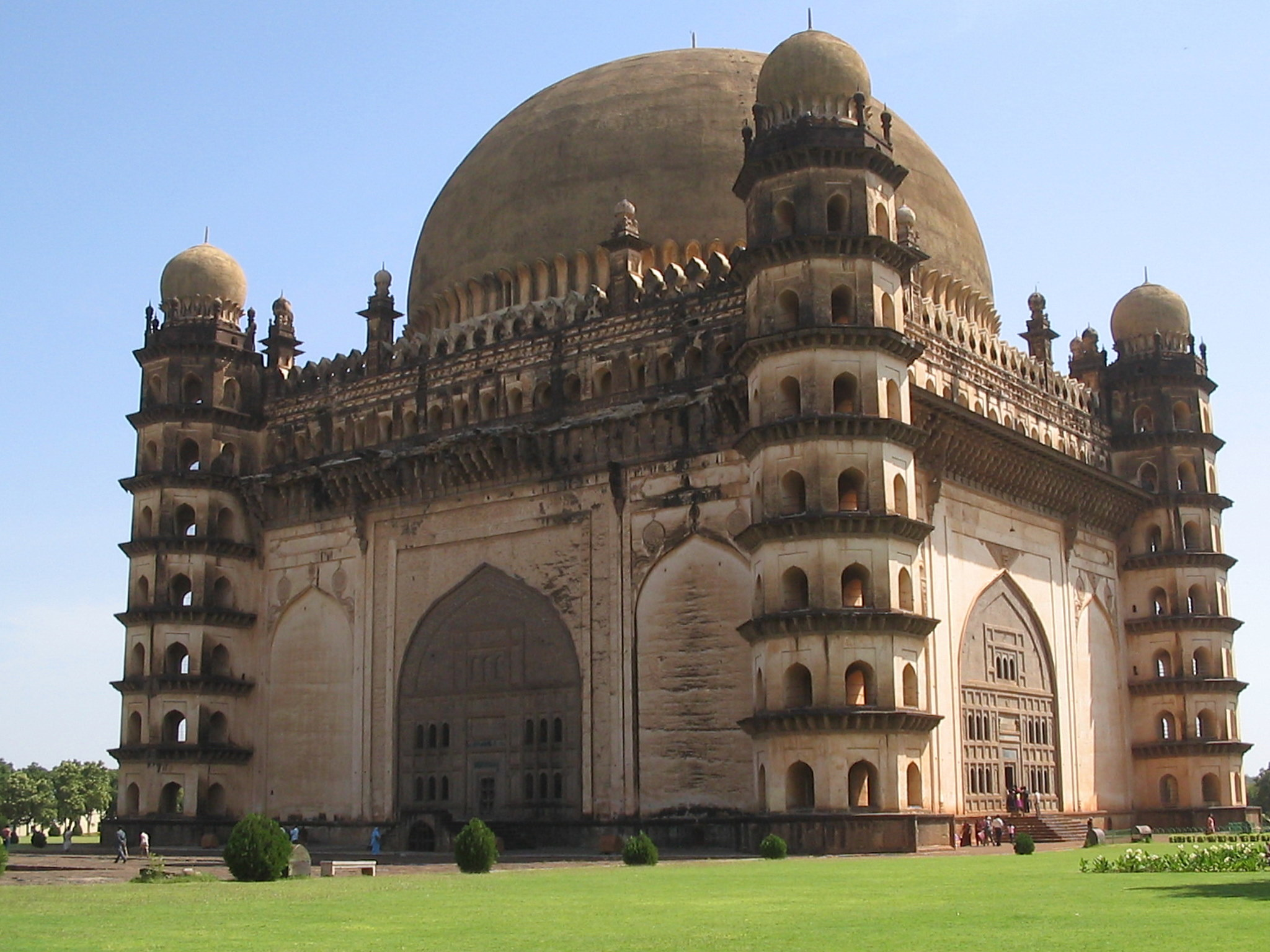
  Gol Gumba

== Deaths ==
- Abdul Rahim Khan-I-Khana poet (born 1556)
- Ibrahim Adil Shah II, later king of Bijapur Sultanate (born 1556)

== See also ==
- Timeline of Indian history
