= Siege of Sambhal =

1526 battle in India

- Part of Mughal conquests
Date	1526
Location	Sambhal, Uttar Pradesh, India
Result	Mughal victory
Territorial changes	Sambhal annexed into Mughal Empire

Belligerents
Mughal Empire	Western Afghan confederates

Commanders and leaders
Bairam Khan; Mirza Hindal Beg; Sheikh Kuren	Malik Baban Jilwani; Kasim Sambhali

Strength
~150	Larger

Casualties and losses
Heavy	High

The Siege of Sambhal (or Battle of Sambhal) took place in the summer of 1526 in present-day Uttar Pradesh, India, as part of the early Mughal conquests. Fought shortly after Babur's decisive victory at the Battle of Panipat. The engagement was led by Mughal commander Mirza Hindal Beg under and the Afghan force under the rebellious Pathan chief Malik Baban Jilwani.

When Malik Baban laid siege to Sambhal, its local Afghan governor, Qasim Sambhali, appealed to Babur for relief. A Mughal vanguard of roughly 150 horsemen launched a surprise charge that routed Baban's larger army before the main relief force arrived. Following the defeat of the besiegers, Hindal Beg secured the town for the Mughals through stratagem, annexing Sambhal into the expanding Mughal realm and subsequently assigning it as a fief to Babur's son, Humayun.

== Background ==
Babur and his army were strangers to the people whom he had subdued in India and a mutual dislike soon manifested itself between his soldiers and the inhabitants of Agra his headquarters. The invasion was regarded as a temporary inundation that would speedily pass off. Every man in authority raised troops and put himself in a condition to act. Those who held delegated authority or Jagirs being generally Afghans were consequently hostile to the new state of things. They soon came to an understanding among themselves and took measures for mutual cooperation.

== Western Afghan confederates and allies ==
Hasan Khan of Mewat in the neighborhood of Agra was the grand instigator of the opposition which was supported by Nizam Khan in Biana; Muhammad Zaitoon of Dholpur; Tatar Khan Sarang khani in Gwalior; Hussein Khan Lohani in Raberi; Kutb Khan in Etawa; Alim Khan Jilal Khan Jighat in Kalpi; Kasim Sambhali in Sambhal and Marghoob a slave in Mahawan within 20 km of Agra. Indeed, all of these chiefs were immediately around Agra or close upon its borders. They looked for aid from Maharana Sangram Singh better known as Rana Sanga, the ruler of Mewar, who on his part laid claim to a great part of the right bank of the Yamuna River including Delhi. These Western Afghans wished to place Sultan Mahmud Lodhi a brother of the late Sultan Ibrahim Lodhi on the throne of Delhi and so to preserve the Afghan and the Lodhi dynasty.

== Siege ==
Babur's first active operation in the field was to dispatch a force to the relief of Sambhal a district lying beyond the Ganges in what is now called Rohilkhand. It was held by Kasim Sambhali who had formerly shown himself hostile to Babur but was glad to solicit his aid when at this time besieged in his chief town by Malik Baban Jilwani. This powerful and active Pathan chief had joined Babur after he had passed Sirhind but subsequently left him under circumstances which are not clear, but he probably was not satisfied with his reception as Babur complains with bitterness of his presumption and pretensions and of the rudeness and stupid forwardness of the Pathans in general. However that may be, Baban had withdrawn himself from Babur's camp had collected an army and now besieged Kasim in Sambhal which he had discovered was ill garrisoned. Kasim reduced to the last extremity applied to Babur for assistance. The Emperor dispatched Hindu Baig with a body of Turks-Mughals along with Sheikh Kuren and his Doab Turkishbunds to his succor.

Hindu Baig marched with all possible expedition till he reached the Ganges and while busily employed in conveying his other troops across that river sent on in advance a Mughal officer with a body of his countrymen. Though the party did not exceed a 150 men, they rode forward till they reached the town and such was the superiority which the invaders from the north had acquired over the troops of the country that the Mughals had no sooner got between the town and the besiegers than they resolutely turned and charged them though already the alarm had been given and Baban had had time to draw out his force. The attack was so vigorous and probably the panic produced by the expected approach of the rest of the detachment so great that Baban's whole army was routed and dispersed several elephants taken and many slaughtered. Next day Hindu Baig arrived with the rest of the troops and had an interview with Kasim Sambhali who made some difficulty about giving up the place. He was soon however seized by stratagem and the fort itself taken possession of. His family and followers were allowed to retire to Biana.

== Aftermath ==
Babur's success did not end here. The fortress of Raberi on the Yamuna was soon after abandoned by its garrison and occupied by his troops and he sent detachments to besiege Etawa and Dholpur two places of the greatest importance from their vicinity to Agra. But these initial victories brought him in direct conflict with the Western and Eastern Afghan confederates at once. Babur then sent an army under his son Humayun who would put to flight the army of the Eastern confederates and take Jaunpur, Oudh, Kalpi.

Meanwhile, the Western Afghan confederates were being gradually swallowed up by Rajput Rana Sanga in the guise of alliance and protection. This was increasingly posing as a major threat to Babur. He was justly alarmed at the progress of Rana Sanga who was in active correspondence with Hasan Khan of Mewat the chief of the Afghan confederacy of the West and had acknowledged as Sultan of Delhi, Mahmud Lodhi, the brother of the late Sultan Ibrahim Lodhi whom the western Afghans had proclaimed King after his brother's death. This would ultimately result in the confrontation known as the Battle of Khanwa.

== See also ==
- Battle of Ghaghra
