= 1510 in India =

- Centuries: 15th; 16th; 17th; 18th
- Decades: 1500s; 1510s; 1520s; 1530s
- See also: List of years in India; Timeline of Indian history

Events from the year 1510 in India.

== Events ==
- 17 February – Afonso de Albuquerque reaches Goa and successfully enters with little conflict
- 30 May – the Portuguese abandon Goa to its former ruler Ismail Adil Shah
- 10 December – Albuquerque recaptures Goa

=== Full date unknown ===
- Ismail Adil Shah becomes king of Bijapur (and rules until 1534)

== Births ==
- June 27 – Kempe Gowda I feudatory ruler under the Vijayanagara Empire is born (d. 1569)

== Deaths ==
=== Full date unknown ===
- Yusuf Adil Shah founder of the Adil Shahi dynasty dies (although it could have been at the beginning of 1511) (born 1459)

== See also ==
- Timeline of Indian history
- Portuguese Conquest of Goa (1510)
