= 1506 in India =

- Centuries: 16th; 17th; 18th
- Decades: 1500s; 1510s; 1520s
- See also: List of years in India; Timeline of Indian history

Events from the year 1506 in India.

== Events ==
- March – Battle of Cannanore (1506)
- Siege of Anjadiva (1506)
- The new city of Agra was founded

== Births ==
- 7 April, Francis Xavier, Roman Catholic missionary active in India is born (dies 1555)

== See also ==
- Timeline of Indian history
