= 1505 in India =

- Centuries: 15th; 16th; 17th; 18th
- Decades: 1500s; 1510s; 1520s
- See also: List of years in India; Timeline of Indian history

Events from the year 1505 in India.

== Events ==
- Viranarasimha Raya succeeds Narasimha Raya II as king of Vijayanagara Empire (reigns until 1509)
- Tristão da Cunha ceases his nominal (never took office) governorship of Portuguese India (commenced 1504)
- Francisco de Almeida becomes governor of Portuguese India (and continues until 1509)
- 7 April, Francis Xavier, Roman Catholic missionary in India (dies 1552)

== Deaths ==
- Narasimha Raya II, king of Vijayanagara Empire

== See also ==
- Timeline of Indian history
