= 1559 in India =

- Centuries: 15th; 16th; 17th; 18th
- Decades: 1530s; 1540s; 1550s; 1560s; 1570s
- See also: List of years in India; Timeline of Indian history

Events from the year 1559 in India.

== Events ==
- The Mughal Emperor Akbar captures Ranthambore Fort for the first time.

== Births ==
- 16 March Amar Singh I, later Maharana of Mewar is born in Chittor Fort (dies 1620)

== Deaths ==
- Sikandar Shah Suri, sixth rule of Sur dynasty
- Fernão Lopes de Castanheda, Portuguese historian and author of "History of the discovery and conquest of India" dies (born c 1500)

== See also ==
- Timeline of Indian history
