= 1508 in India =

- Centuries: 15th; 16th; 17th; 18th
- Decades: 1500s; 1510s; 1520s
- See also: List of years in India; Timeline of Indian history

Events from the year 1508 in India.

== Events ==
- The Christian-Islamic power struggle in Europe and the Middle East spills over into the Indian Ocean as Battle of Chaul during the Portuguese-Mamluk War

== Births ==
- 7 March – Humayun (Nasir ud-din Muhammad Humayun), later Mughal emperor (died 1556)

== Deaths ==
- March, Lourenço de Almeida Portuguese explorer and military commander dies in the Battle of Chaul (born c 1480)
- Mayimama Marakkar, Indian ambassador of the Zamorin ruler of Calicut dies at the Battle of Chaul

== See also ==
- Timeline of Indian history
