= 1511 in India =

- Centuries: 16th; 17th; 18th
- Decades: 1500s; 1510s; 1520s; 1530s
- See also: List of years in India; Timeline of Indian history

Events from the year 1511 in India.

== Events ==
- 23 November Mahmud Begada's rule of Gujarat Sultanate ends with his death (began 1498)

== Births ==
- Bega Begum later empress of the Mughal Empire is born (dies 1582)

== Deaths ==
- 23 November Mahmud Begada dies
- Yusuf Adil Shah founder of the Adil Shahi dynasty (although he may have died at the end of 1510) (born 1459)

== See also ==
- Timeline of Indian history
