= 1504 in India =

- Centuries: 15th; 16th; 17th; 18th
- Decades: 1500s; 1510s; 1520s
- See also: List of years in India; Timeline of Indian history

Events from the year 1504 in India.

== Events ==
- 22 April – 6th Portuguese India Armada (Albergaria, 1504) sets sail for India, and arrives late August/Early September
- March – July – Battle of Cochin (1504)
- Battle of Pandarane
- Tristão da Cunha becomes nominal governor of Portuguese India (but never took office)

== Births ==
- 31 March, Guru Angad the second of the Sikh Gurus is born in Sarae Naga in Muktsar (dies 1552)
- Ranabai, warrior and a Hindu mystical poet (dies 1570)

== Deaths ==
- Qasim Barid I, prime-minister of the Bahmani sultanate and the founder of the Bidar Sultanate dies (born 1489)

== See also ==
- Timeline of Indian history
