= 1503 in India =

- Centuries: 15th; 16th; 17th; 18th
- Decades: 1500s; 1510s; 1520s
- See also: List of years in India; Timeline of Indian history

Events from the year 1503 in India.

== Events ==
- January – Battle of Calicut
- March – August – First siege of Cochin (1503)
- Kingdom of Kochi is taken over by the Portuguese creating the first European settlement in India
- Unniraman Koyikal I reign as King of Cochin ends
- Unniraman Koyikal II reign as King of Cochin begins
- The Portuguese army under Commander Dom Afonso de Albuquerque who reached Cochin in 1503, defeated the enemies of the King of Cochin and in return he gave them permission to build a fort in Kochi
- The Casa de Contratación was founded by Queen Isabella I of Castile in 1503, eleven years after the discovery of the Americas in 1492.
- Diogo Fernandes Pereira visited Socotra, the first European to do so, and he discovered the Mascarenes archipelago

== Establishments ==
- Pallipuram Fort established by the Portuguese in Kerala
- St. Francis Church, in Kochi, Kerala, the oldest European church in India

== Births ==
- Gopala Bhatta Goswami, one of the goswamis of Vrindavana is born (dies 1578)

== Deaths ==
- Tuluva Narasa Nayaka, Vijayanagar commander and prime minister

== See also ==
- Timeline of Indian history
