= 1556 in India =

- Centuries: 15th; 16th; 17th; 18th
- Decades: 1530s; 1540s; 1550s; 1560s; 1570s
- See also: List of years in India; Timeline of Indian history

Events in the year 1556 in India.

== Events ==
- 14 February – at the age of 13 Akbar becomes the emperor of Mughal India
- 7 October – Hemu, the Chief Minister and general of Adil Shah Suri defeats the Mughals in the Battle of Tughlaqabad and captures Delhi.
- 5 November – The Mughals defeat Hemu in the Second Battle of Panipat and recapture Delhi.

== Births ==
- 17 December – Abdul Rahim Khan-I-Khana poet (died 1627)
- Ibrahim Adil Shah II, later king of Bijapur Sultanate (died 1627)

== Deaths ==
- 1 January – Humayun of Mughal India (born 1508)
