= 1501 in India =

- Centuries: 16th; 17th; 18th
- Decades: 1500s; 1510s; 1520s
- See also: List of years in India; Timeline of Indian history

The following lists events that happened during 1501 in India.

== Incumbents ==
- Prabhat Ray, founder and ruler of the Jaintia Kingdom, 1500–1516
- Miran Adil Khan II, Sultan of the Faruqi dynasty, 1457–1501
- Rudra Pratap Singh, Raja of Orchha State, 1501-1531
- Dhanya Manikya, Maharaja of Tripura, 1463-1515

== Events ==
- The 2nd Portuguese India Armada (Cabral, 1500) left India in January
- The 3rd Portuguese India Armada (Nova, 1501), funded by Bartolomeo Marchionni, landed in India in August
- The Portuguese Armada fought the navy of the Zamorin of Calicut in the First Battle of Cannanore on 31 December
- Pedro Álvares Cabral left India on 16 January and returned to Portugal with pepper, ginger, cinnamon, cardamom, nutmeg, mace, and cloves. The profits made from this trip were huge.
- Guru Nanak made his first Udaasis, stopping in Gwarighat on the way back
- Mallabairegowda built Devanahalli Fort
- Rudra Pratap Singh founded Orchha State

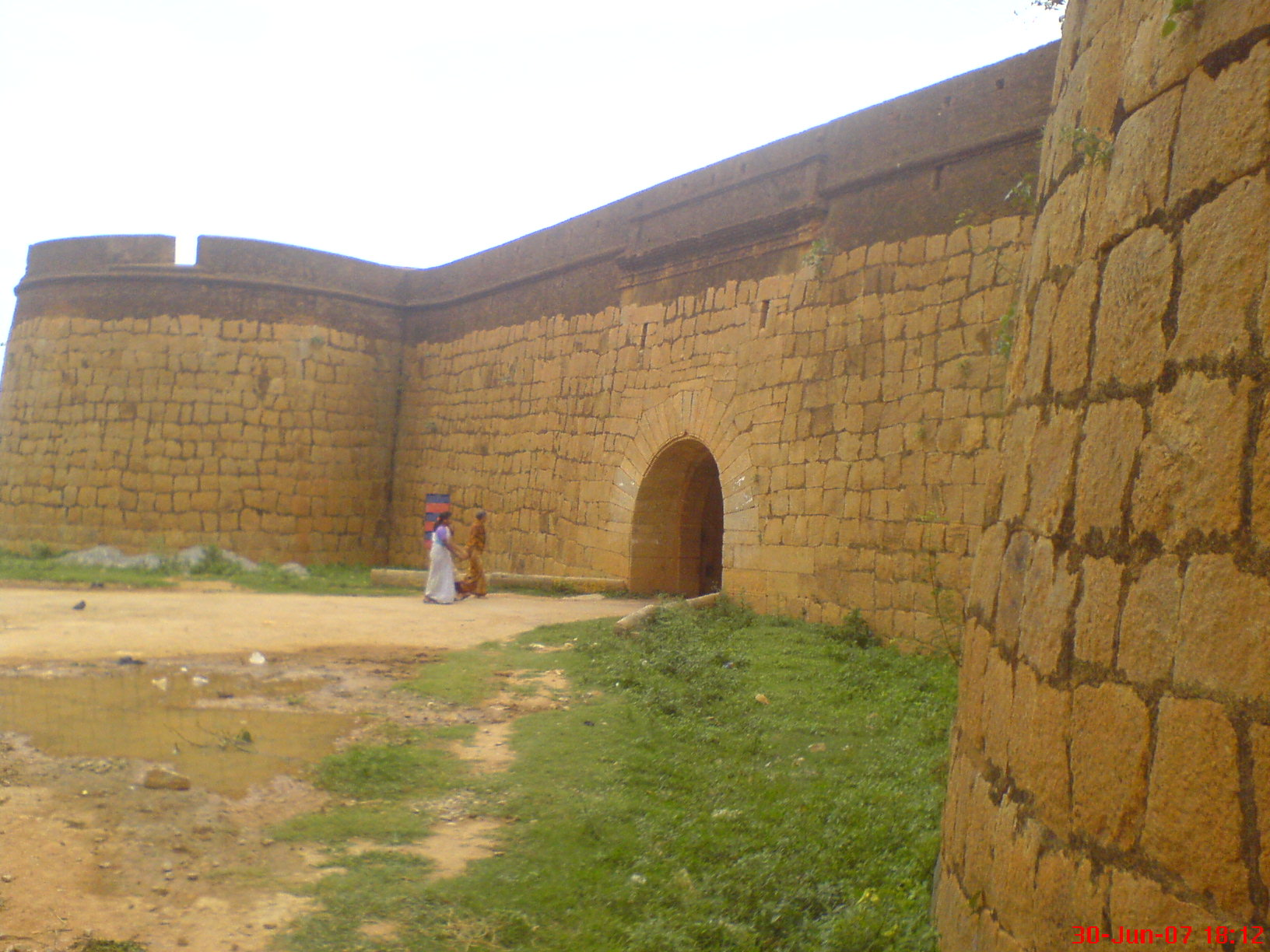
Devanahalli fort

- Sikandar Lodi conquered Dholpur in Rajasthan
- Portuguese tried to conquer Diu Island but failed
- Dhanya Manikya constructed the Tripura Sundari Temple in Udaipur, Tripura
- Nilakantha Somayaji wrote Tantrasamgraha, an important astronomical treatise
- The Jain manuscript Devasanpada Kalpasutra was written

== Deaths ==
- Miran Adil Khan II, Sultan of the Faruqi dynasty
- Ali-Shir Nava'i, who extensively influenced India, died on 9 February in Herat, Timurid Empire

== See also ==
- Timeline of Indian history
