= Rey Khas =

Village in Kangra district, Himachal Pradesh

Rey
- Village
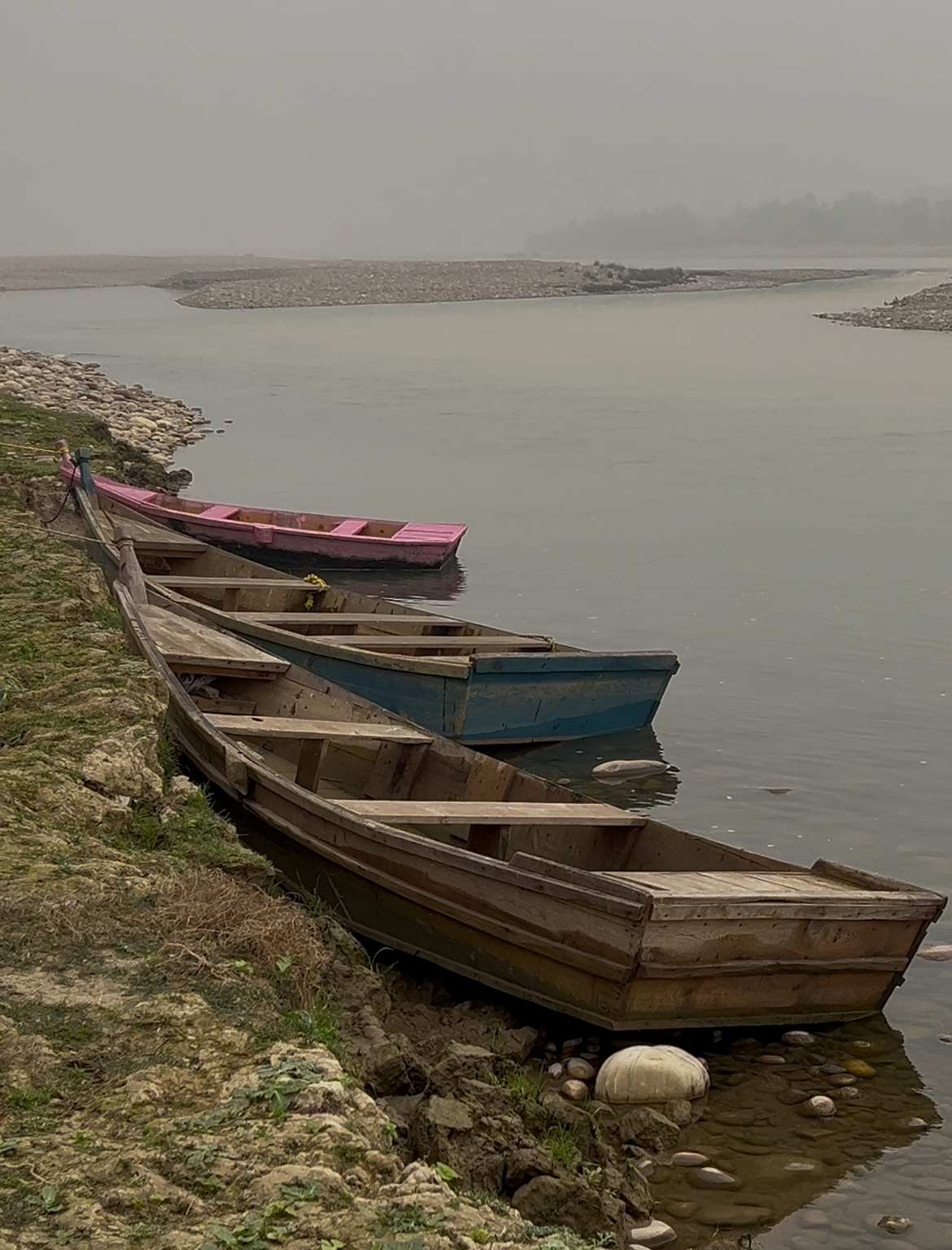
- Rey Khas former harbour

- Location in Himachal Pradesh, India
- Coordinates: 31.987°N 75.857°E
- Country: India
- State: Himachal Pradesh
- District: Kangra

Area
  - Total: 10 km^{2} (3.9 sq mi)
- Elevation: 326 m (1,070 ft)

Population (2011)
  - Total: 1,951
  - Density: 200/km^{2} (510/sq mi)

Languages
  - Official: Hindi
- Time zone: UTC+5:30 (IST)
- PIN: 176058
- Telephone code: 01893
- Vehicle registration: HP-88

Rey or Rey Khas is a small village in Kangra district at borders of Himachal Pradesh, India along a rivulet to which Talwara & Hazipur are the nearer towns in plains of Punjab while Indora & Fatehpur Tehsil H.Q in Himachal are farther in the hills. One can reach Rey Khas by train up to Amb Andaura railway station (AADR) ,Mukerian (MEX) or Pathankot (PTX). MDR 42 road passes through Rey Khas connecting NH 44 with NH 503, nearest airport is Pathankot Airport (IATA: IXP, ICAO: VIPK).

== History ==
Rey was famous in history as harbour over Beas River and was designated as shikargah or (imperial hunting grounds) in mughal maps especially for Nilgai game.

Bairam Khan is reputed to have taken refuge there with his army at 'Bairun the ban' after defeat at Battle of Gunecur and finally surrendered to Mughals at Hajipur (20 km from Rey Khas) in 1560. Rey Shikargah has survived as Pong Dam Lake Wildlife Sanctuary and the Beas Conservation Reserve begins at Harike and extends to its endpoint further along the river upto this area.

In 1830 Sikh Empire awarded Rey Jagir to their courtier Ishri Singh, a descendant of Nurpur kingdom, the post lapsed due to Doctrine of lapse after the death of Kishen Singh in 1879. In 1882 it was renewed by another member of family's parallel branch, General Shankar Singh of Jammu and Kashmir (princely state). From 1899 Mian Raghunath Singh remained Jagirdar of Rey till 1942 and Col. Hoshiar Singh remained last Jagirdar when the post was abolished in 1952. The heritage building at Rey Kothi are from jagirdari era.

Following the abolition of jagirdari structures and the implementation of Panchayati Raj in Himachal Pradesh, the Gram Panchayat became the basic unit of rural governance. From this period onward, the office of the Sarpanch emerged as a democratically elected and empowered institution, entrusted with statutory authority over village administration, local development, resolution of minor disputes, and implementation of government welfare schemes.

The village was served by the following Sarpanchs during this era:

- 1968–1980: Col. Devi Singh Pathania
- 1981–1985: Th. Narinder Singh Pathania
- 1985–1990: Col. Devinder Singh Pathania
- 1991–2000: Th. Jai Singh Pathania
- 2001–2005: Smt. Surjeet Kumari (Reserved for Women)
- 2006–2010: Sh. Om Prakash (Reserved for OBC)
- 2011–2015: Th. Sukhdeep Singh Pathania

This period marks the institutional consolidation of grassroots democracy and the active functioning of elected local self-governance in the village.

== Demographics ==
Re Khas is a medium size village located in Fatehpur Tehsil of Kangra district, Himachal Pradesh administrated by Sarpanch (Head of Village) who is elected representative of 430 resident families from ten villages: 1. Aghar, 2. Banihani Gujran, 3. Beh. 4. Beli Rajianla, 5. Bhadrial, 6. Ghumali, 7. Kharela, 8. Kulali, 9. Rey Khas, 10.Sarela

Economically and socially Rey Khas village is advanced than average Himachal Pradesh village, reflected in higher statistics compared to state average.

- Sex ratio is 1003 females per 948 males, higher than state average of 970 female per 1000 males.
- Literacy rate is 83.15% compared to state average of 82.80%.
- Average Sex Ratio is 1058 while state average of 972.
- Child Sex Ratio is 1131, while than state average of 909.

== Establishments ==
- Government Degree College Rey

Established in 2016, GDC Rey is a state-funded institution affiliated with Himachal Pradesh University offering undergraduate courses in Arts and Commerce.

- Community Health Centre

Established in 1939, CHC Rey is the main public healthcare facility operating under the Block Medical Office Fatehpur. It provides free government medical services, accepts walk-in patients, and is open from 10:00 AM to 4:00 PM, Monday to Saturday.

- Government Primary School Rey Aghar

Established in 1935, GPS Rey Agahar is a government-run primary school in the rural Fatehpur block of Kangra district, Himachal Pradesh, managed by the Department of Education. It offers Classes 1 to 5 in Hindi medium, operates from a government building with two classrooms, basic facilities including electricity, tap water, functional toilets, a small library with 150 books, and provides mid-day meals. The co-educational school has no pre-primary section, playground, or computer facilities, but is accessible by an all-weather road.

== Temples ==
- Thakurdwara Mandir Rey According to a temple inscription dated 1843, the Krishna temple of black marble statue was erected by Jagirdar Ishri Singh, a descendant of the Nurpur Kingdom whose daughter was married to Raja Dhian Singh, the longest serving Prime Minister of the Sikh Empire (1818-1843).
- Dehri A Memorial shrine (dehri) was raised in the temple premises of Thakurdwara Mandir Rey, in memory of Ishri Singh’s daughter who became sati on 16 September 1843. Earlier, Raja Dhian Singh and Emperor Sher Singh were assassinated in Lahore in a conspiracy led by Ajit Singh Sandhawalia on 15 September 1843, Hira Singh, son of Raja Dhian Singh, led a counter-coup the next day and eliminated those responsible.
- Kotli Mata Mandir is a temple dedicated to Kotli Mata situated at the top most point of the area is of very ancient times.
- Prachin Shiv Mandir During later British rule, a 10-foot Shiv Pindi emerged from the ground and was later transformed into a Shiva temple. Historically, in 1557, to protect Shiva lingam from the wrath of Mughal invader Bairam Khan, the temple's pujari buried the pindi. Over time, it was forgotten until it resurfaced. The temple belongs to the late Th. Narinder Singh Pathania and his family, who later nurtured it and constructed the temple building around the pindi.

== Notable personalities ==
- Mian Raghunath Singh, Jagirdar of Rey wrote a vernacular history book in 1904 which became a reference to many English authors of 20th century like John Hutchinson, John Beames, Alexander Cunningham, J Vogel. It was translated by Govt. of Himachal Pradesh in 2004.
- Gen Anant Singh Pathania, MVC belonged to this place
- Virendera Singh Pathania, VrC flying ace was born here.
- The book From the Banks of Beas mentions Commandant Hira Singh's odyssey from the time he went with his unit 19th Bengal Lancers - Fane's Horse to war in France in World War I till he finally retired and came back to his village Rey on the banks of the Beas River ( Hira Singh was Virendera Singh Pathania's grandfather).

== Gallery ==
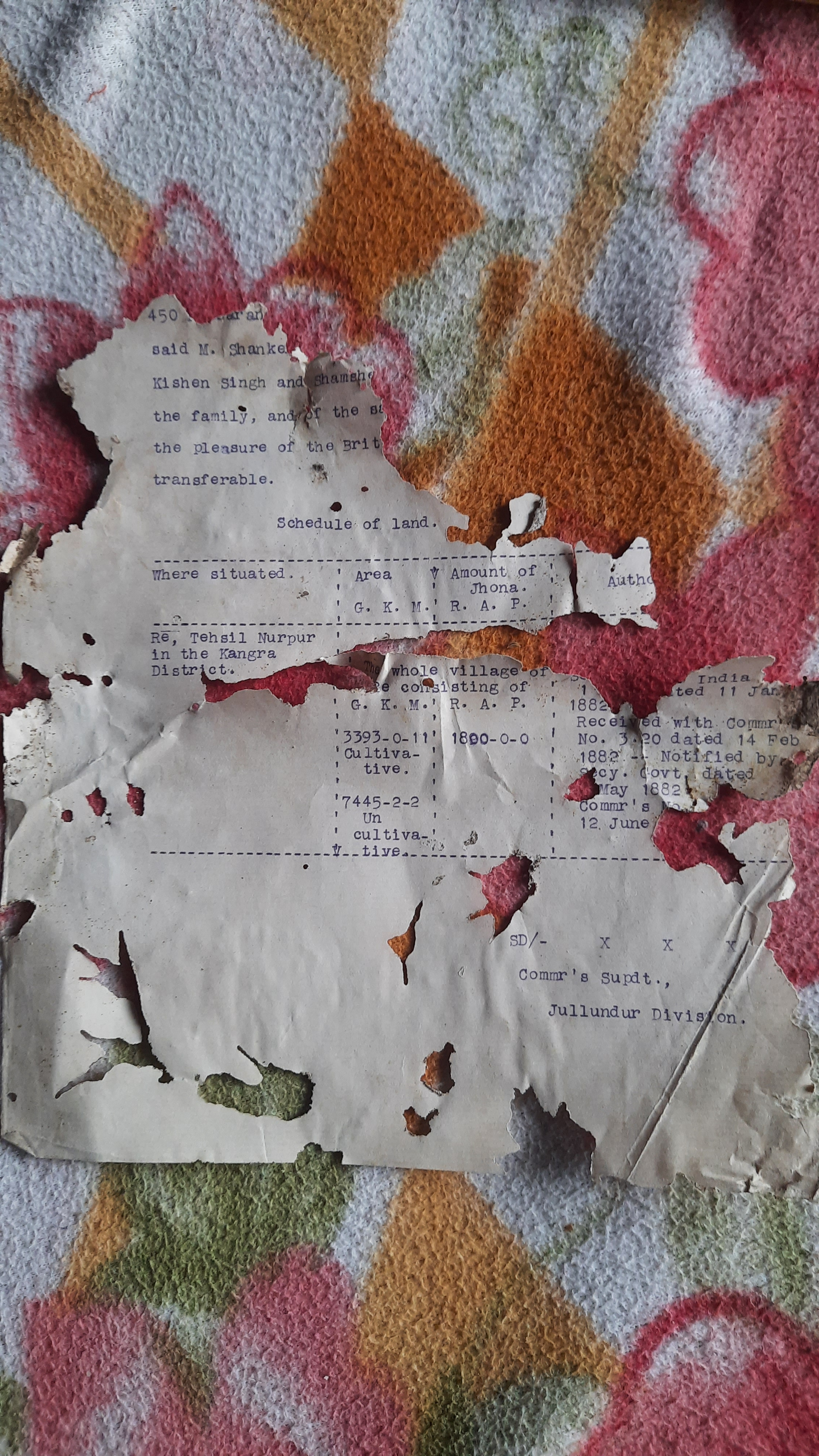
Land details

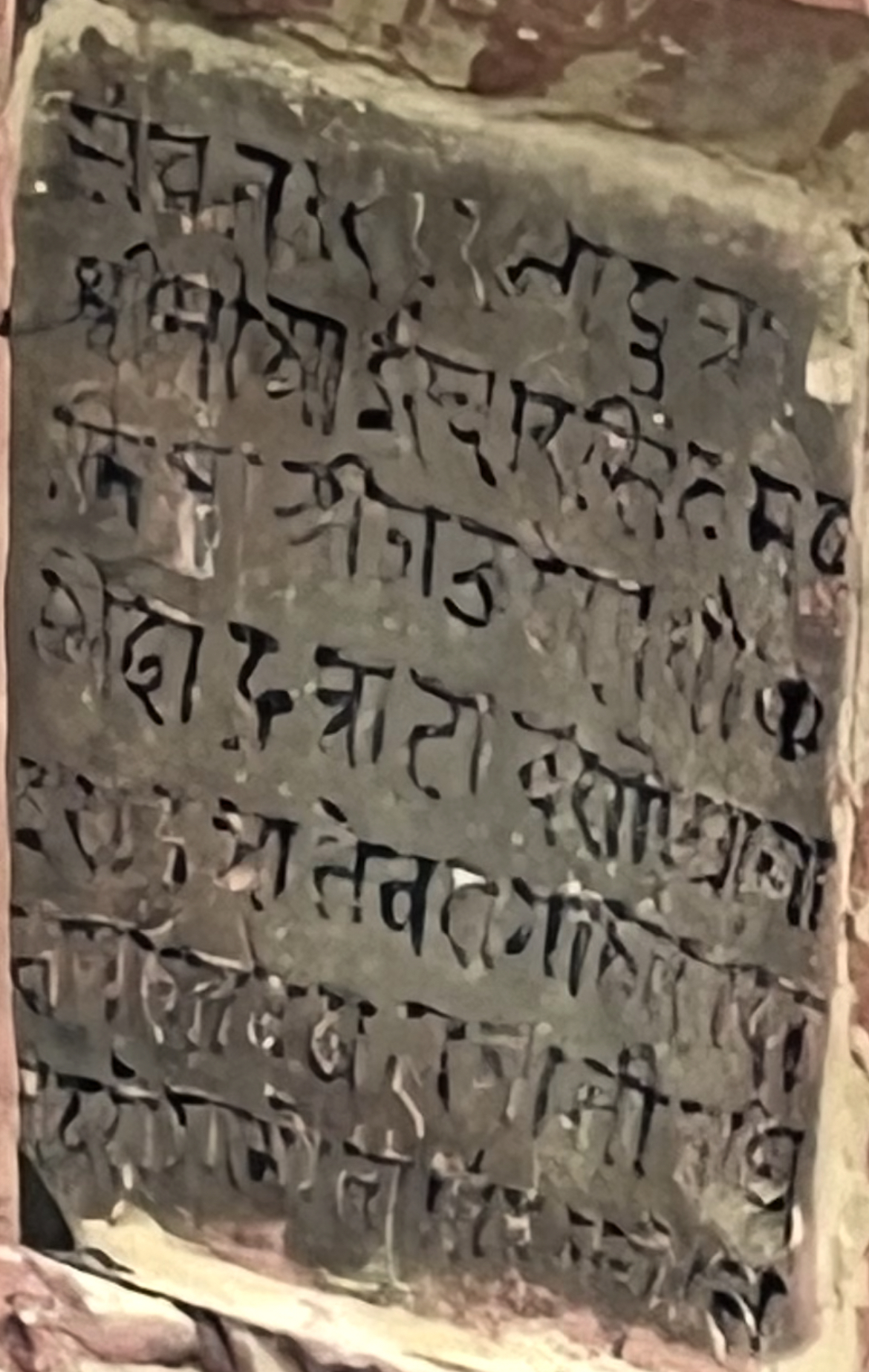
Inscriptions on Thakurdwara Rey
