= 1509 in India =

- Centuries: 16th; 17th; 18th
- Decades: 1500s; 1510s; 1520s
- See also: List of years in India; Timeline of Indian history

Events from the year 1509 in India.

== Events ==
- 3 February – Battle of Diu is fought.
- 26 July – Krishnadevaraya starts his reign as Emperor of the Vijayanagara Empire
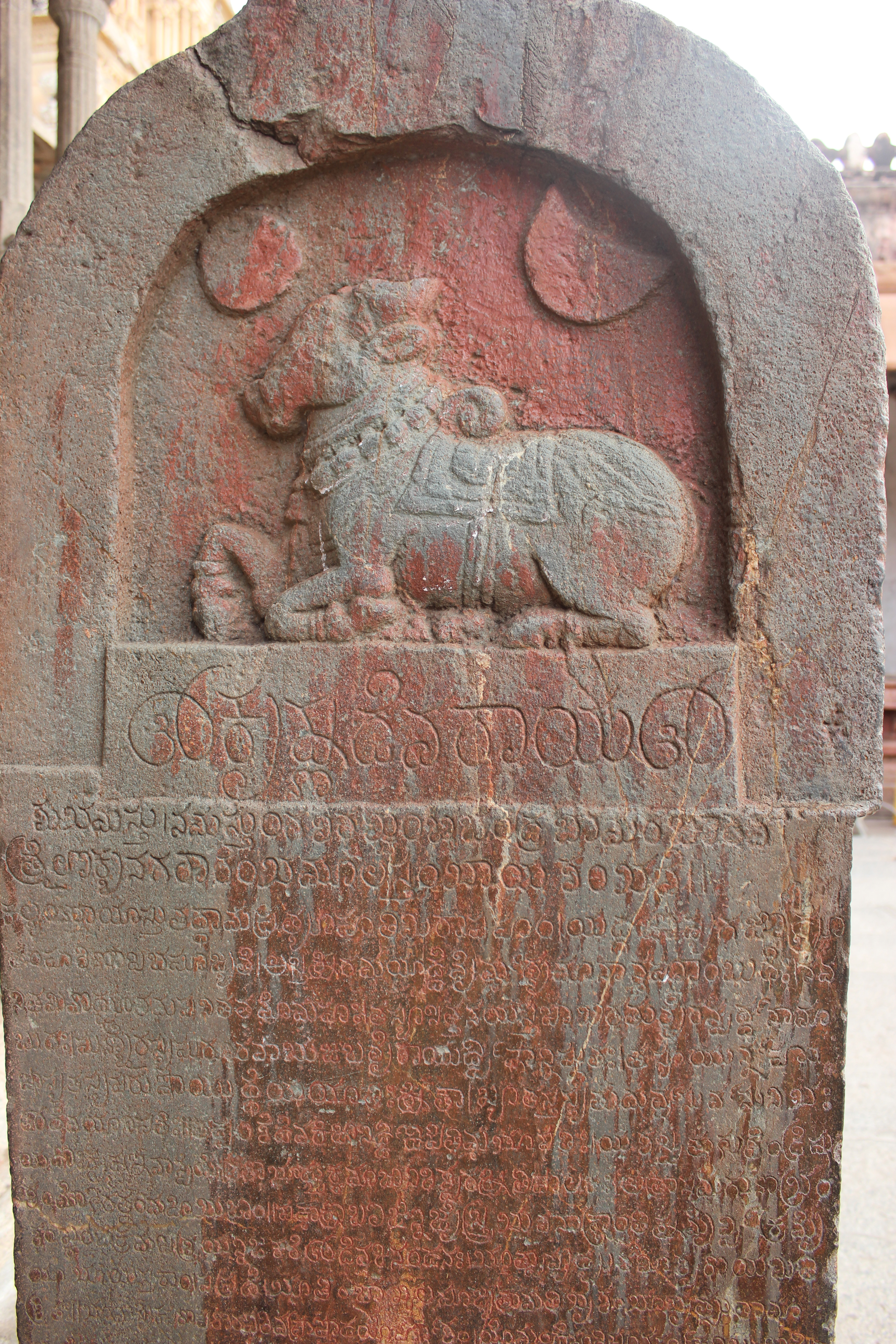
  Kannada inscription dated 1509 A.D., of Krishnadevaraya at the Virupaksha temple in Hampi describes his coronation and the construction of the large open mantapa
- Francisco de Almeida ceases his governorship of Portuguese India (commenced 1505)
- Afonso de Albuquerque becomes governor of Portuguese India (and continues until 1515)
- The Portuguese acquire Bombay.

== Births ==
- Kanaka Dasaru poet, philosopher, musician and composer is born in modern Karnataka (dies 1609)

== Deaths ==
- Viranarasimha Raya king of Vijayanagar Empire

== See also ==
- Timeline of Indian history
