= Bairam Khan =

Mughal military commander and statesman (1501–1561)

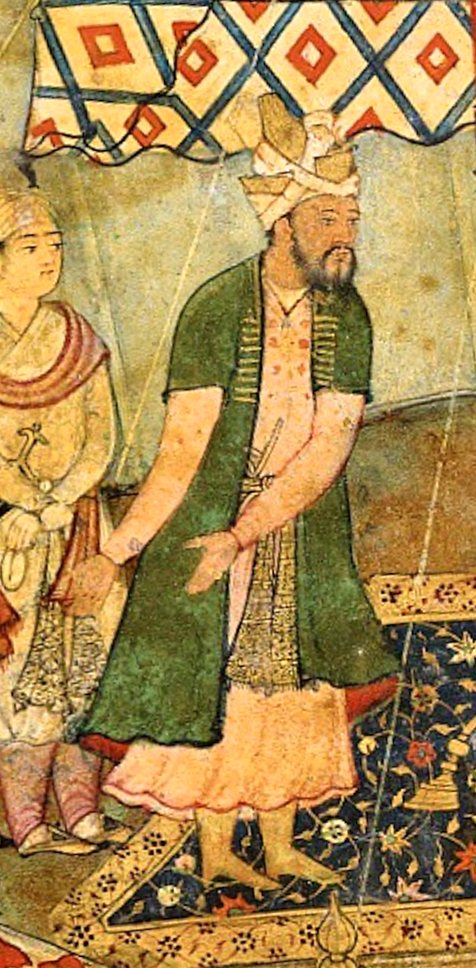
- Near contemporary portrait of Bairam Khan at the 1558 Siege of Mankot. Painting from the Akbarnama c. 1590

Grand Vizier of the Mughal Empire
- In office 1556 – March/April 1560
- Monarch: Akbar
- Succeeded by: Munim Khan

Vakil of the Mughal Empire
- In office 14 February 1556 – March/April 1560
- Succeeded by: Munim Khan

Regent of the Mughal Empire
- In office 27 January 1556 – March/April 1560
- Monarch: Akbar

Personal details
- Born: 18 January 1501 Badakhshan (present-day Afghanistan, China or Tajikistan)
- Died: 31 January 1561 (aged 60) Sahasralinga Talav, Patan, Sultanate of Gujarat (present-day Gujarat, India)
- Spouse(s): Jamal Khan's daughter Salima Sultan Begum (m. 1557)
- Children: Abdul Rahim
- Profession: Chief advisor of Akbar, Military commander and commander-in-chief of Mughal army and Mughal Statesman

Military service
- Allegiance: Mughal Empire
- Years of service: 1517–1560
- Commands: Mughal Army
- Battles/wars: Battle of Ludhiana; Battle of Khanwa; Battle of Ghaghra; Siege of Sambhal; Battle of Chausa; Battle of Kannauj; Battle of Machhiwara; Battle of Sirhind; Second Battle of Panipat; Battle near Gunecur (as the leader of a rebel faction of the Mughal Army)

Muhammad Bairam Khan (Persian: محمد بیرم خان; 18 January 1501 – 31 January 1561), commonly known as Bairam Khan or Bayram Khan was an important military commander, and later commander-in-chief of the Mughal army, a powerful statesman and regent at the court of the Mughal Emperors Humayun and Akbar. He was also the guardian, chief mentor, adviser, teacher and the most trusted ally of Akbar. Akbar honoured him as Khan-i-Khanan, which means "King of Kings". Bairam was originally called Bairam "Beg", but later became honoured as Khan. Bairam Khan was an aggressive general who was determined to restore Mughal authority in India.

== Biography ==
=== Early life and ancestors ===
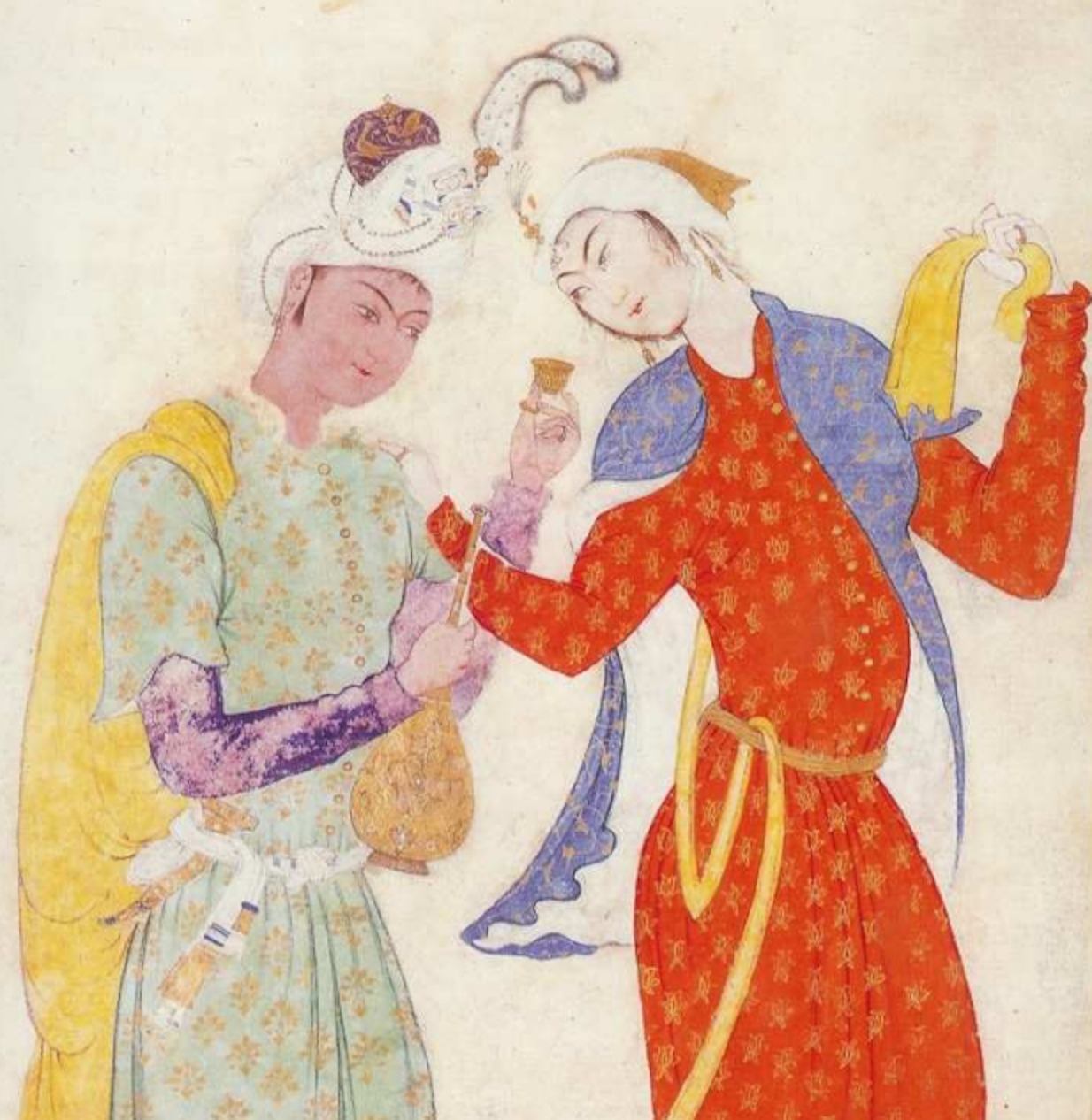
The Princely Lovers, a likely depiction of an affair between Bairam Beg and the Safavid Princess Soltanum.

Bairam Khan was born in the region of Badakhshan in Central Asia, and belonged to the Baharlu Turkoman clan of the Kara Koyunlu confederation. The Kara Koyunlu had ruled Western Persia for decades before being overthrown by their Ak Koyunlu rivals. Bairam Khan's father, Seyfali Beg Baharlu, and grandfather, Janali Beg Baharlu, had been part of Babur's service. His great-grandparents were Pirali Beg Baharlu and his wife, a daughter of the Qara Qoyunlu ruler Qara Iskander; Piroli's niece through his sister Pasha Begum had been one of the wives of Babur. Bairam entered Babur's service at the age of 16.

=== Service under Humayun ===
Bairam Khan contributed greatly to the establishment of the Mughal Empire under Humayun when he was entrusted with the position of muhardar (keeper of the seals) and took part in military campaigns in Benares, Bengal and Gujarat. In 1540, during the Battle of Kannauj, he was captured by Sher Shah Suri's men, but later managed to make an adventurous escape, and rejoined Humayun at Sindh in July 1543. He accompanied Humayun during his exile in Persia and helped conquer Kandahar before serving as its governor for nine years. In 1556, he played a leading role as a commander in Humayun's reconquest of Hindustan.

=== As regent of Akbar ===
At the time of Humayun's death on 27 January 1556, Bairam Khan was leading a campaign against Sikandar Shah Suri in Punjab (in present-day India) as the then Prince Akbar's ataliq (guardian) and sipahsalaar (commander-in-chief) of the Mughal army. To consolidate the Mughal Empire, Bairam Khan kept Humayun's death a secret, sending reassuring messages of his recovery and having Mullah Bekasi, a loyal cleric in Delhi (who looked similar to Humayun) dressed up in the imperial robes and make the usual daily appearance before the people from the balcony of the fort, till Akbar's coronation. He also secured the loyalty of his rival, Tardi Beg by appointing him as the governor of Delhi.

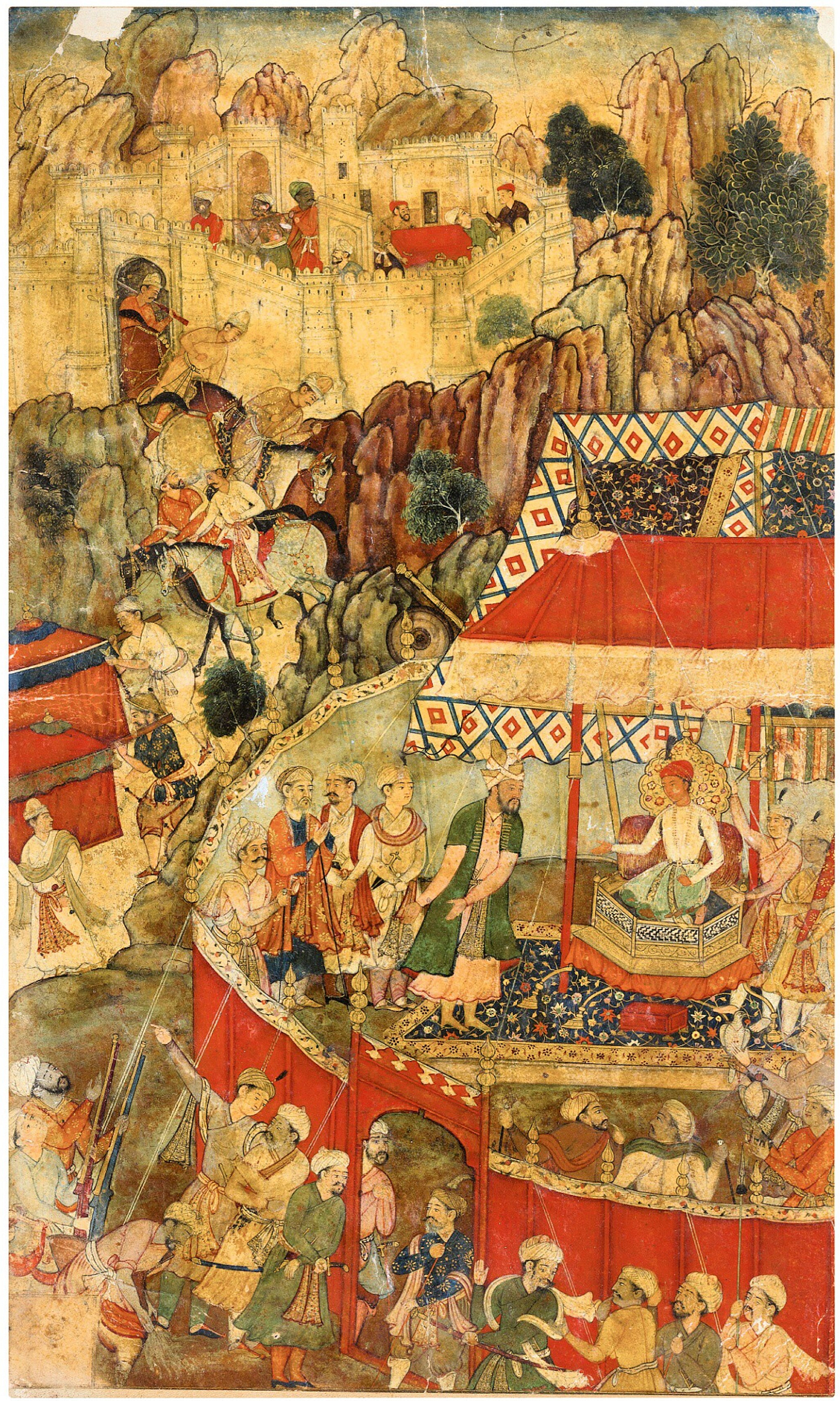
Bairam Khan (center) at the Siege of Mankot (1557)

On 14 February 1556, Akbar was crowned as the new Mughal Emperor and his first deed was to appoint Bairam Khan as Vakil (Prime Minister) and grant him the lofty titles of Khan-i-Khanan and sipahsalaar itizad-i-daulat qahira (commander-in-chief of the army, mainstay of victorious dominion). Under Bairam Khan's leadership, the Mughal army moved to Jalandhar, where they encamped for five months and managed to drive Sikandar Suri deeper into the Siwalik hills. However, the Mughals now had to face a far greater threat from Hemu, Vakil of Adil Shah Suri, the final ruler of the Sur dynasty.

Taking advantage of the political instability in the Mughal Empire, Hemu swiftly took Gwalior, Delhi and Agra. Leaving behind a small force to keep Sikandar Suri in check, Bairam Khan moved the Mughal Army towards Sirhind and ordered Tardi Beg (who had been defeated by Hemu at the Battle of Tughlaqabad, near Delhi on 7 October 1556 and retreated) to meet the imperial army there. At Sirhind, differences arose between Bairam Khan and Tardi Beg as to what would be their military strategy in the future. Shortly afterwards, Bairam Khan had Tardi Beg executed for his cowardice during the Battle of Tughlaqabad, though there is some doubt as to whether these allegations were true as Tardi Beg was a senior official and a political rival of Bairam Khan and his execution certainly helped consolidate the authority of Bairam Khan. Conveniently, Akbar was absent during the whole incident as he was out on a hunting trip. Tardi Beg's execution helped discipline the demoralised Mughal army.

On 5 November 1556, the Mughals clashed with Hemu's army at the Second Battle of Panipat. After a fiercely contested battle, the Mughals were victorious. Hemu was captured and decapitated, either by Bairam Khan or Akbar and Delhi and Agra subsequently reconquered. After resting for a month at Delhi, Akbar and Bairam Khan resumed their campaign against Sikandar Suri, who had attempted to attack Lahore; he was driven back to the hill-fortress of Mankot (in present-day Jammu and Kashmir) where he waited for six months for Afghan reinforcements in the Siege of Mankot (1557), to no avail. Disheartened, he finally surrendered to Akbar on 25 July 1557, where he was treated with clemency and given a fief in Bihar.

=== Dismissal ===
Towards his last years, relations between Bairam Khan and Akbar grew sour. The main reason was that Bairam Khan had begun to take several decisions without consulting the Emperor first, such as when he unilaterally dismissed his former favourite Pir Muhammad Khan, who was a senior Mughal official. Akbar felt jealous that a leash was kept on his private expenses while Bairam Khan's servants grew rich. He had also become increasingly irritable, and executed two of Akbar's favourite personal mahouts, one of which had not been able to restrain an imperial elephant, which killed one of Bairam Khan's animals, and the other had not been able to restrain his elephant which nearly overturned a small boat on which Bairam Khan was resting. After the final incident, Akbar decided that Bairam Khan could no longer stay in his position. In March or April 1560, Akbar told him that he could either retire and stay in the palace or go on the hajj pilgrimage to Mecca. He could take whatever land he wished so that his servants could send him remittances of the harvest annually.

=== Rebellion ===
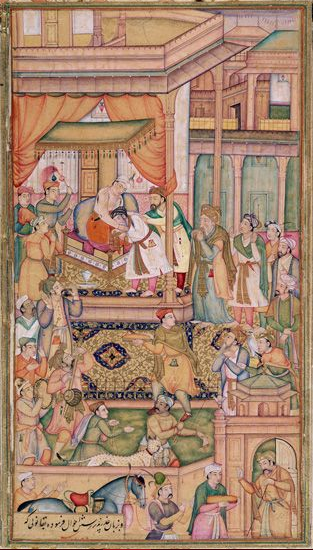
Bairam Khan submits to Akbar

Rejecting the advice of his close friends and supporters he decided not to rebel, but later his political opponents Maham Anga and her son Adham Khan sent Pir Muhammad to trail him and 'pack him off to Mecca'. This insult goaded Bairam Khan to rebel, and he turned back. Pir Muhammad retreated at the sight of Bairam Khan's deadly Turkoman horse archers. Akbar tried in vain to send another firman to Bairam Khan, ordering him to continue his pilgrimage. Bairam Khan left his family in the fortress of Tabar-e-Hind (in present-day Bathinda) and headed towards Jalandhar, intent on taking Lahore. Forced to fight his former mentor, Akbar sent his foster father Shams-ud-din with a strong vanguard to halt or slow down Bairam Khan's force while he followed with the main army. Near the village Gunecur, near Jalandhar, Shams-ud-Din stopped Bairam Khan's force. He tried to negotiate, but Bairam Khan remained adamant on fighting.

Despite having a much smaller army, Bairam Khan gave a tough fight to his adversary but was eventually defeated. However, Bairam Khan managed to retreat with the majority of his force to Talwara-Hazipur adjoining Rey Shikargah (Mughal imperial hunting grounds) from where he surrendered and was treated by Akbar with immense respect. Akbar gave him the options of staying in the court as his personal adviser, picking a jagir of his choice, or continuing his pilgrimage. Bairam Khan chose the last option.

=== Assassination ===
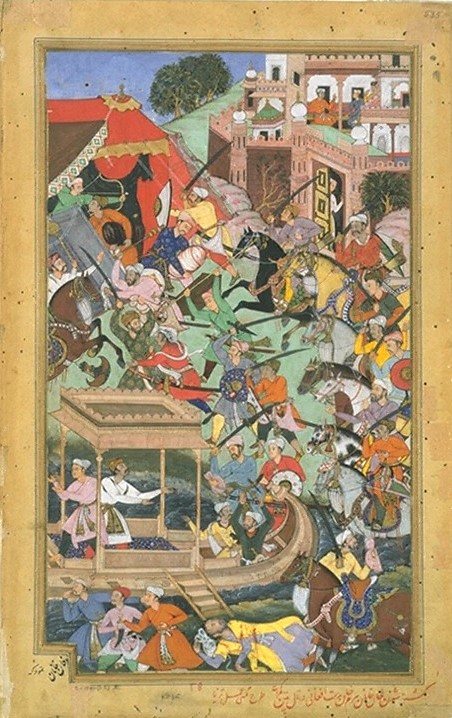
Bairam Khan is assassinated by an Afghan at Patan, 1561, Akbarnama

While travelling through Gujarat he was assassinated on 31 January 1561 at Sahasralinga Tank, a religious site near Anhilwad Patan, by a group of Afghans led by Mubarak Khan Lohani, whose father had been killed while fighting with the Mughals at the Battle of Machhiwara in 1555. According to the Akbarnama, the group of Afghans had apparently come to pay their respects to him, so he allowed them to come closer. Thereupon, Mubarak stabbed him with a dagger in the back with such force that the point came out of his chest, and another Afghan struck him on the head, fatally wounding him. Bairam Khan died saying the takbir. His corpse was later found by a group of locals, who buried him at the tomb of a nearby Sufi saint.

His son and wife managed to escape to Ahmedabad, where they stayed for several months before Akbar heard of their plight and had them escorted to Agra. Bairam's wife, Salima who was also a cousin of Akbar, married Akbar after his death. Bairam's son, Abdul Rahim Khan-i-Khanan, became an important part of Akbar's administration and was one of the nav-ratans (nine gems) of Akbar's court.

== Personal life ==
Bairam Khan was a Shia Muslim and was disliked by some of the Sunni Turkic nobles. Khan promoted Sheikh Gadai to the position of sadurat-i-mamalik (Chief Justice) in 1559.

=== Marriages ===
The Gazetteer of Ulwur states:

Soon after Babar's death, his successor, Humayun, was supplemented by Sher Shah in 1540 A.D., later followed by Islam Shah in 1545 A.D. During the reign of the latter, a battle was fought and lost by the Emperor's troops at Firozpur Jhirka in Mewat, on which, however, Islam Shah did not lose his hold. Adil Shah, the third of the Pathan interlopers, who succeeded in A.D. 1552, had to contend for the Empire with the returned Humayun.

In these struggles for the restoration of Babur's dynasty, Khanzadas apparently do not figure at all. Humayun seems to have conciliated them by marrying the elder daughter of Jamal Khan, the nephew of Babur's opponent Hasan Khan Mewati, and having his minister, Bairam Khan, marry Jamal's younger daughter. Bairam's other wife was Salima Sultan Begum, who married Akbar after his death.

== In popular culture ==
=== Films and television ===
- Behram Khan, a 1946 Indian Hindi-language film by Gajanan Jagirdar (who also starred in the titular role), is based on the life of Bairam Khan and his role in the founding of the Mughal Empire.
- He was portrayed by actor Yuri Suri in the 2008 Indian historical epic Jodhaa Akbar by Ashutosh Gowariker.
- Other notable portrayals include by Naved Aslam in the television series Jodha Akbar (2013–2015) which aired on Zee TV
- Also by Shahbaz Khan in Sony TV's Bharat Ka Veer Putra – Maharana Pratap (2013–2015).
- Bairam Khan in Akbar Rakht Se Takht Ka Safar in 2017 Indian drama television series tracing Akbar's journey to the Mughal throne.
- In the 2023 ZEE5's web series Taj: Divided by Blood, he is portrayed by Mir Sarwar.

== Sources ==
- Ansari, N.H. (1989). "BAYRAM KHAN". Encyclopaedia Iranica, Vol. IV, Fasc. 1. pp. 3–5.
- Schimmel, Annemarie (1980). Islam in the Indian Subcontinent. BRILL. ISBN 978-9004061170.
