= 1517 in India =

- Centuries: 16th; 17th; 18th
- Decades: 1500s; 1510s; 1520s; 1530s
- See also: List of years in India; Timeline of Indian history

Events from the year 1517 in India.

== Events ==
- Ibrahim Lodi become ruler of the Sultanate of Delhi following his father's (Sikandar Lodi) death

== Deaths ==
- 20 November – Sikandar Lodi, ruler of the Sultanate of Delhi from 1489

== See also ==
- Timeline of Indian history
