= 1516 in India =

- Centuries: 15th; 16th; 17th; 18th
- Decades: 1500s; 1510s; 1520s; 1530s
- See also: List of years in India; Timeline of Indian history

Events from the year 1516 in India.

== Events ==
- Portuguese commander Dom Joao de Monoy entered the Mahim Creek and defeated the commander of the Mahim Fort.
- Church of Our Lady of Light is built in Chennai
- Varahanatha Temple a Hindu temple complex is established in Jajpur

== Births ==
- Gusainji, Hindu guru is born in Charnat

== See also ==
- Timeline of Indian history
