= 1512 in India =

- Centuries: 15th; 16th; 17th; 18th
- Decades: 1500s; 1510s; 1520s; 1530s
- See also: List of years in India; Timeline of Indian history

Events from the year 1512 in India.

== Events ==
- Santa Catarina do Monte Sinai built in Kochi, India

== See also ==
- Timeline of Indian history
