= 1500 in India =

- Centuries: 16th; 17th
- Decades: 1500s; 1510s; 1520s
- See also: List of years in India; Timeline of Indian history

The following lists events that happened during 1500 in India.

== Incumbents ==
- Prabhat Ray, founder and ruler of the Jaintia Kingdom, 1500–1516

== Events ==
- Medieval India is divided between many kingdoms, including the Delhi Sultanate, Lodi Sultanate, Ahom Kingdom, Vijayanagara Empire, Gajapati Empire, Deccan Sultanates, Chitradurga Kingdom, Garhwal Kingdom, Mysore Kingdom, and the Keladi Kingdom
- India's economy had a 24.5% share of world income, the second largest in the world after China, which had a 25% share.
- Vijayanagara in the Vijayanagara Empire had about 500,000 inhabitants (supporting 0.1% of the global population during 1440–1540), making it the second largest city in the world after Beijing and almost three times the size of Paris.
- Pedro Álvares Cabral, a Portuguese military commander and explorer, led a fleet from Anjadip in East Africa to Calicut where he landed on 13 September, establishing the first ties between Europe and India. Cabral successfully negotiated with the Zamorin (the title of the ruler of Calicut) and obtained permission to establish a factory and a warehouse. In hopes of further improving relations, Cabral dispatched his men on several military missions at the Zamorin's request. (Note: The "Zamorin asked Pedro Alvares Cabral a favor. The former was interested in one of the seven elephants carried in a ship belonging to a merchant from Cochin which was passing by Calicut. As a token of friendship, Alvares Cabral was requested to capture the ship and get the elephant on which the Zamorin's eyes were fixed. Though Cabral did not want to run the risk of offending the King of Cochin, he had to come forward to show a good gesture to the Zamorin. He put two noble men and sixty soldiers in charge of a ship (nau) and ordered them to capture the elephants along with the ship of the Cochim merchant. Pêro [Pedro] de Ataíde was put in command of the Portuguese vessel which was supposed to overpower the ship of the above mentioned merchant well armed with 300 fighters on board. Pêro de Ataíde confronted the Indian ship near Cannanore. The Indian ship sent a host of arrows and shots of cannons from its guns toward the Portuguese ship. The Portuguese ship responded promptly with all her artillery. As desired by the Zamorin, the coveted elephants were delivered to him by Pêro de Ataíde after capturing the ship. This boosted the military prestige of the Portuguese. [...] Besides, Pêro de Ataíde managed to destroy four ships of the Muslims near Canannore and a few paraus. Another day, five ships were put to flight by Pêro de Ataíde. As the prestige of the Portuguese Navy went on increasing day by day, the Zamorin himself began to fear that Portuguese might destroy the kingdom of Calicut. [...] As a result the Zamorin permitted the Muslims to attack the Portuguese factory at Calicut who killed Aires Correa and fifth Portuguese men in the factory.".) However, on 16 or 17 December, the factory suffered a surprise attack by some 300 (according to other accounts, perhaps as many as several thousand) Muslim Arabs and Hindu Indians. Despite a desperate defence by crossbowmen, more than 50 Portuguese were killed. (Note: Other sources give figures which vary between 20 and 70 Portuguese who were wounded or murdered. See Greenlee 1995, p. xxiii.) The remaining defenders retreated to the ships, some by swimming. Thinking that the attack was the result of unauthorised incitement by jealous Arab merchants, Cabral waited 24 hours for an explanation from the ruler of Calicut, but no apology was forthcoming.
- The Portuguese were outraged by the attack on the factory and the death of their comrades and seized 10 Arab merchant ships at anchor in the harbour. Around 600 of their crews were killed and the cargoes confiscated before the merchantmen were set afire. Cabral also ordered his ships to bombard Calicut for an entire day in reprisal for the violation of the agreement. The massacre was blamed in part on Portuguese animosity towards Muslims, which had developed over centuries of conflict with the Moors on the Iberian peninsula and in North Africa. Moreover, the Portuguese were determined to dominate the spice trade and had no intention of allowing competition to flourish. The Arabs also had no desire to allow the Portuguese to break their monopoly on access to spices. The Portuguese had started out by insisting on being given preferential treatment in every aspect of the trade. The letter from King Manuel I brought by Cabral to the ruler of Calicut, which was translated by the ruler's Arab interpreters, sought the exclusion of Arab traders. The Muslim merchants believed that they were about to lose both their trading opportunities and livelihoods, and attempted to sway the Hindu ruler against the Portuguese. The Portuguese and Arabs were extremely suspicious of each other's every action.
- Cabral's fleet sailed to Kochi on 24 December. Kochi was nominally a vassal of Calicut, as well as being dominated by other Indian cities. Kochi was eager to achieve independence, and the Portuguese were willing to exploit Indian disunity—as the British would three hundred years later. This tactic eventually ensured Portuguese hegemony over the region. Cabral forged an alliance with Kochi's ruler, as well with rulers of other Indian cities, and was able to establish a factory. At last, loaded with precious spices, the fleet went to Kannur for further trade before setting out on its return voyage to Portugal on 16 January 1501.
- The Portuguese Crown began managing its trade monopoly with India through Casa da Índia, a relationship that lasted until 1570
- Jaintia Kingdom was founded in what is now northeastern India

== Deaths ==
- Pero Vaz de Caminha, a Portuguese knight and secretary to the royal factory, died in a riot on 15 December in Calicut

== See also ==
- Timeline of Indian history

== Bibliography ==
- Bueno, Eduardo (1998). A viagem do descobrimento: a verdadeira história da expedição de Cabral (in Portuguese). Rio de Janeiro: Objetiva. ISBN 978-85-7302-202-5.
- Diffie, Bailey W.; Winius, George D. (1977). Foundations of the Portuguese empire, 1415–1580. Europe and the World in the Age of Expansion. Vol. 1. Minneapolis: University of Minneapolis Press. ISBN 0-8166-0782-6.
- Greenlee, William Brooks (1995). The voyage of Pedro Álvares Cabral to Brazil and India: from contemporary documents and narratives. New Delhi: J. Jetley.
- Kurup, K. K. N. (1997). India's naval traditions: the role of Kunhali Marakkars. New Delhi: Northern Book Centre. ISBN 978-81-7211-083-3.
- McClymont, James Roxburgh (1914). Pedraluarez Cabral (Pedro Alluarez de Gouvea): his progenitors, his life and his voyage to America and India. London: Strangeways & Sons.
