= 1557 in India =

- Centuries: 16th; 17th; 18th
- Decades: 1530s; 1540s; 1550s; 1560s; 1570s
- See also: List of years in India; Timeline of Indian history

Events from the year 1557 in India.

== Events ==
- The Sur Empire comes to an end
- Siege of Mankot as part of the Mughal expansion
- Emperor Akbar welcomes his mother to India

== See also ==
- Timeline of Indian history
