= Bhil Pal =

Ruler of Nurpur (1473–1513)

Raja Bhil Pal (1473–1513) was a ruler of the kingdom of Nurpur, in the Himalayan foothills. He was a contemporary of Sikandar Lodi of Delhi (1488–1516), and assisted him in his wars and therefore increased his own territory.

The Punjab had come under Muslim rule from the time of its conquest by Mahmud of Ghazni, and the states bordering on the plains were probably the first to suffer. The Pathania kings were on good terms with the Sultans at Delhi, at that period of time, therefore their territory was independent, and as a result it was greatly enlarged during Raja Bhil Pal's reign. During his rule the kingdom of the Pathania Rajas extended far into the plains of Punjab and in the opposite direction to the borders of Chamba and Kangra. He was succeeded by his son, Raja Bakht Mal on the throne.
