= Hajipur, Punjab =

Hajipur
- Town
- Location in Punjab, India Hajipur (India)
- Coordinates: 31.987°N 75.85°E
- Country: India
- State: Punjab
- District: Hoshiarpur
- Elevation: 288 m (945 ft)

Population (2001)
  - Total: 5,366

Languages
  - Official: Punjabi
- Time zone: UTC+5:30 (IST)
- PIN: 144221
- Area code: 01883
- Vehicle registration: PB54

Hajipur is a census town in Hoshiarpur district in the Indian state of Punjab named after Bairam Khan's pilgrimage Haj to Mecca after losing a battle at this place.

== Geography ==
Hajipur is located at 31.266°N 76.15°E.

== Demographics ==
As of 2001 India census, Hajipur had a population of 5366. Males constitute 52% of the population and females 48%. Hajipur has an average literacy rate of 78%, higher than the national average of 59.5%: male literacy is 81%, and female literacy is 75%. In Hajipur, 11% of the population is under 6 years of age.
