= 1558 in India =

- Centuries: 16th; 17th; 18th
- Decades: 1530s; 1540s; 1550s; 1560s; 1570s
- See also: List of years in India; Timeline of Indian history

Events from the year 1558 in India.

== Events ==
- Ibrahim Adil Shah I reign (since 1534) as king of the Bijapur Sultanate ends with his death
- Ali Adil Shah I reign as 5th Bijapur Sultanate begins (until 1580)

== Deaths ==
- 23 August Joao De Bustamante, pioneer of the art of printing in India, specifically in Goa dies (born 1536).
- Ibrahim Adil Shah I, king of the Bijapur Sultanate

== See also ==
- Timeline of Indian history
