= Shikargah =

Hunting Ground

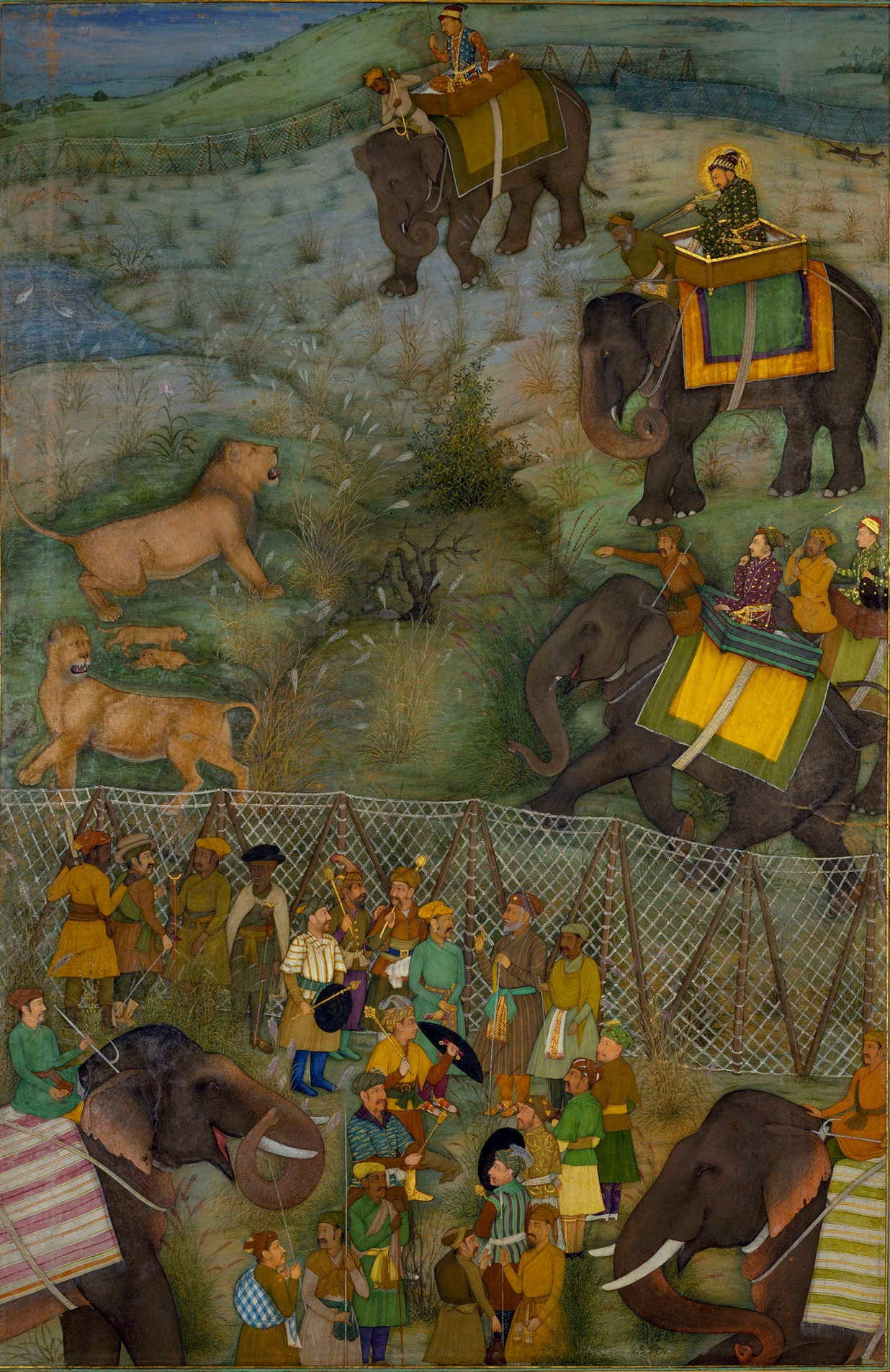
The Mughal Emperor Shah Jahan hunting wild Asiatic lions in Burhanpur (July 1630)

Shikargah (Hindi: शिकारगाह śikārgāh), from Persian shikārgāh meaning shikār hunting + gāh ground, is often described as a hunting ground where 'qamargah' or encircling of game occurs, an overtone of war exercise performed within a controlled arena of flora and fauna to create easier shooting and camping for hunting party.

The Mughals, who already had a hunting tradition in Central Asia, brought the practice to India upon their conquest of the subcontinent. On such occasions unresolved matters of courts were settled which included conspiration and preparation for mutinying, raising of invasion forces.

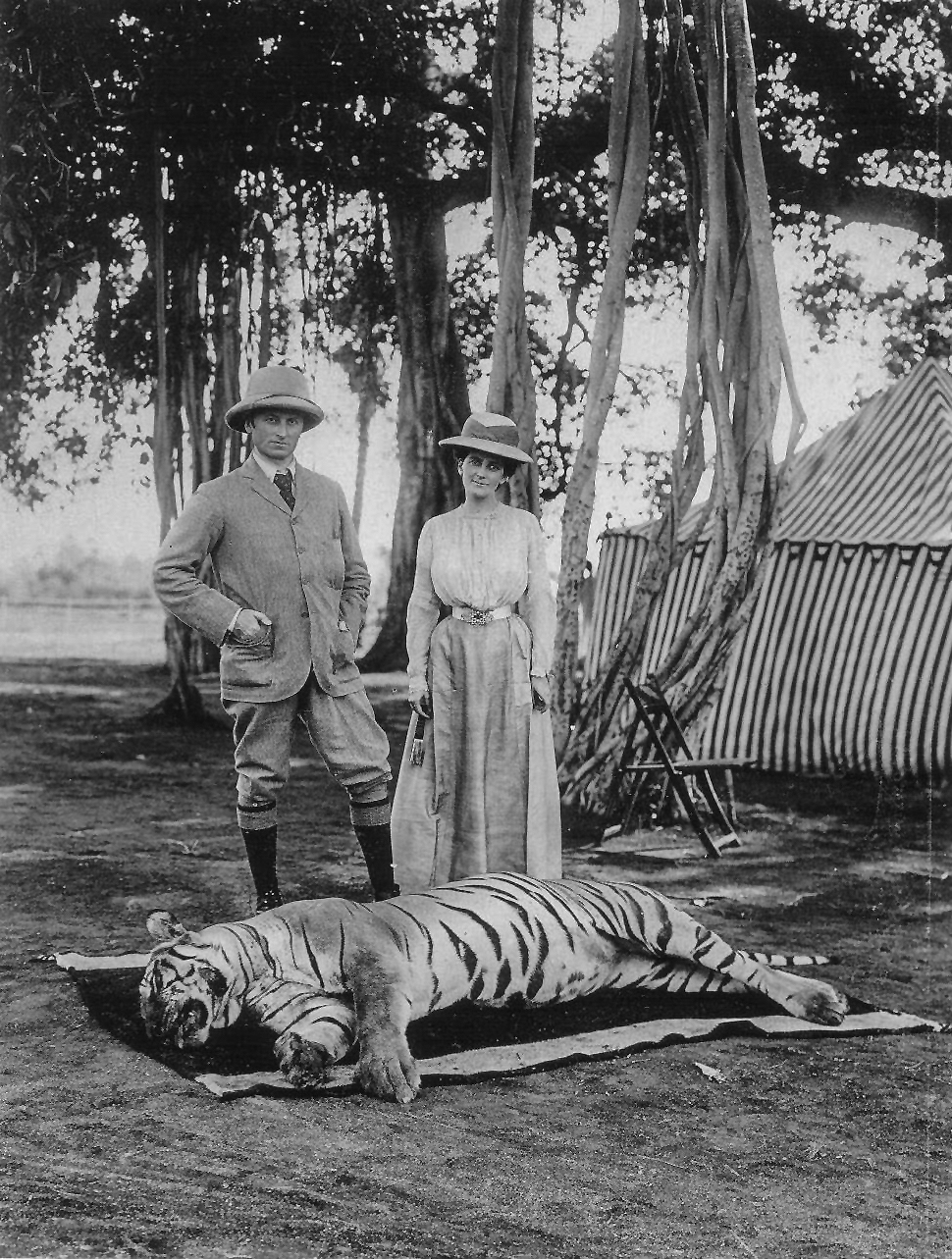
Lord Curzon Viceroy of British India ( 1899-1905)

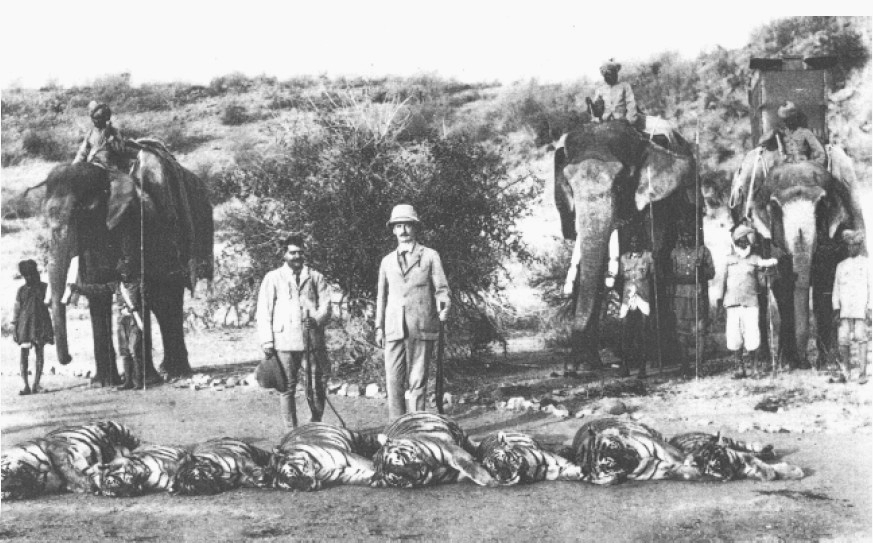
Lord Reading Viceroy of British India ( 1921-1926)

The British continued to entertain their dignitaries with elaborate tiger hunts famously known as "hunting party" at these Shikargah.

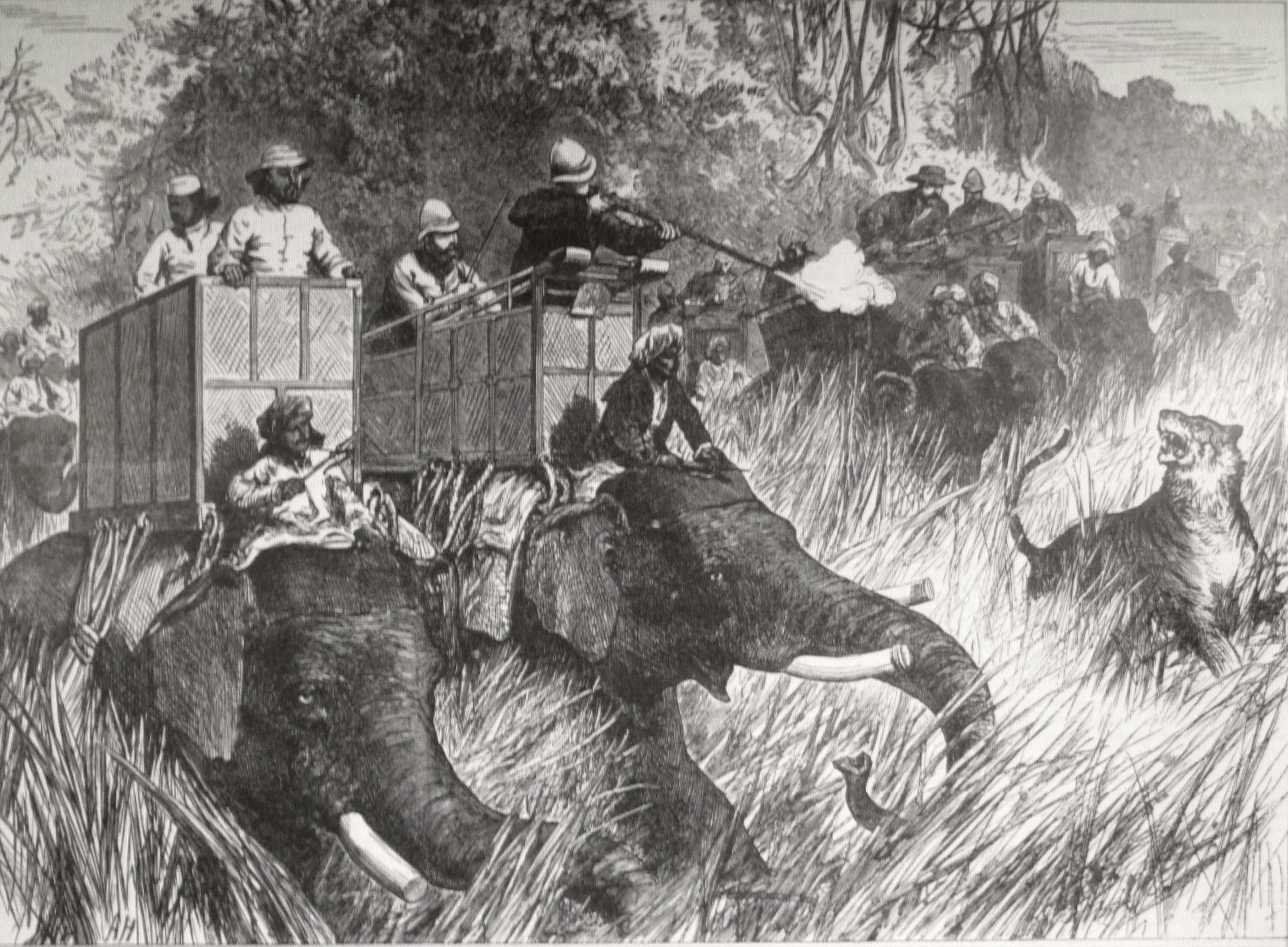
King George V poses with the day’s kills during his tour of India in 1912; from 1875 to 1925, more than 80,000 tigers were killed

== Chronicled Shikargah ==
Terrorizing wild beasts were often tamed by Mughals who considered themselves as protectors of people, sources record over seventy shikargahs situated in mountainous forests, deserts, Indo-Gangetic floodplains, rocky outcrops, and coastlands.

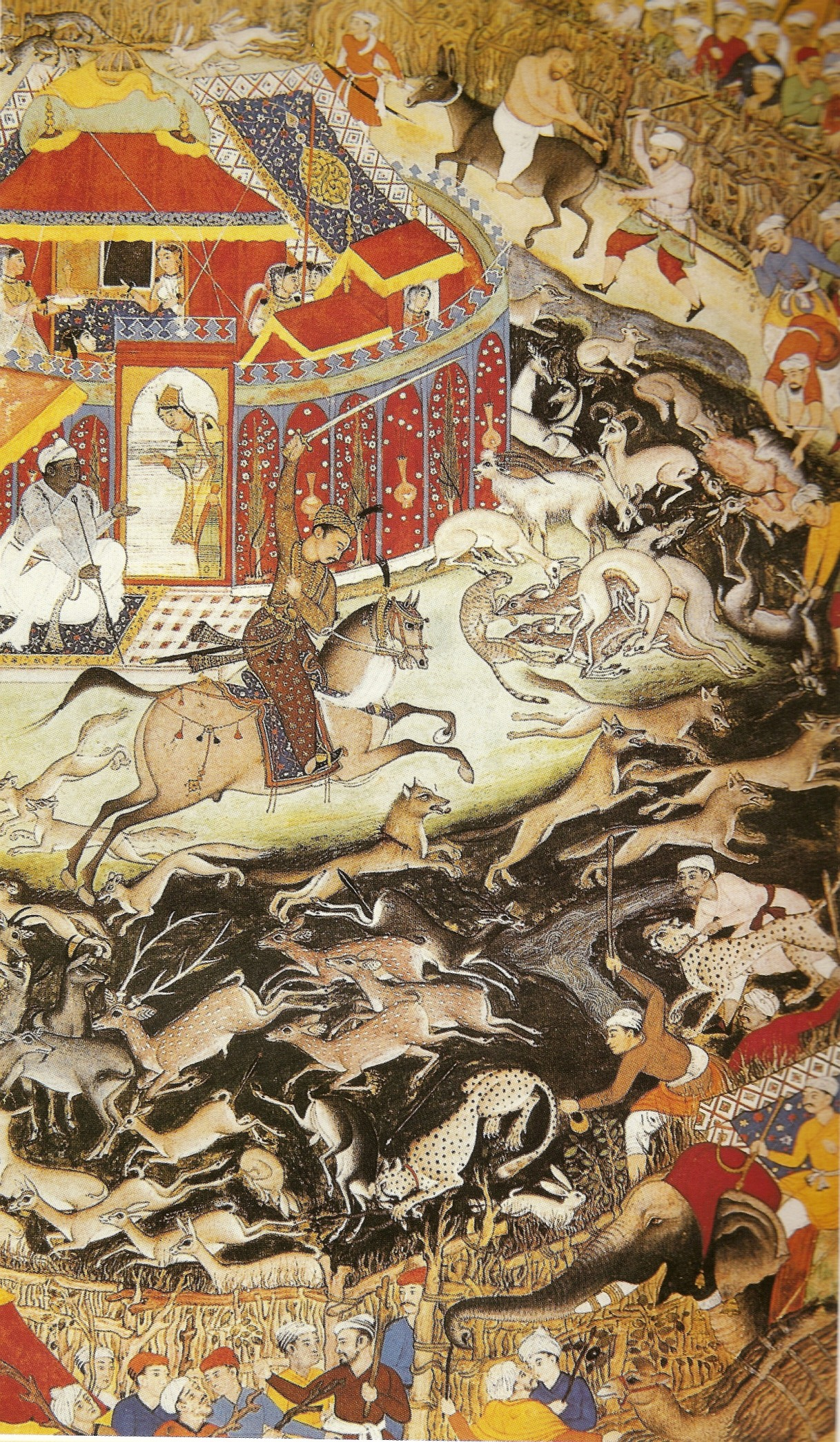
Akbar on a hunt

- Agra Shikargah, Uttar Pradesh (Note: Abu’l-Fazl, Ain-i-Akbari, vol. 1, 297 mentions Simawali, Samugarh, Dahra, Jalesar, Rupbas, Bari, Somauli, Alapur, Simawali, Bhatinda, Sunnam, and Bhatnir as favoured shikargahs and manzil-gahs near Agra; The Bayaz-i khwushbu’i, a seventeenth century handbook for Mughal noblemen, mentions Dahra Bagh as a hunting garden where Mughal emperors encamped and hunted on numerous occasions, and which was frequented by Jahangir.) (Note: Mundy, Sketches, pages:37–41, 48–51; Mundy mentions shikargahs in the vicinity of major cities such as Lucknow (37–41), Fatehgarh (48–51), and Belaspore (73). Captain Mundy recorded the above facts during Governor General Henry Hardinge's pre-1857 tenure, the biggest tiger hunt which has not been met since 1911 was done by Henry Hardinge's grandson Lord Hardinge then Viceroy of India (1910-1916), who shot a tiger than measured 11 feet and 6 inches.)
- Ajmer Ana Sagar Lake, Nur Chashma Shikargah, Rajasthan (Note: A painting attributed to Nanha portrays Jahangir and Rana Karan of Mewar 1615, at Anasagar c.1623, R316/S.163) (Note: Bailey, ‘Sweet-Smelling Notebook’, pages:132–33 mentions Jahangir hunting regularly in the favored Nur Chashma (Hafiz-Jamal) hunting garden near Ajmer; See Jahangir, Tuzuk, vol. 1, pages:182, 232, 234, vol. 2, pages:75–76.; Jahangir, Jahangirnama, page:202 mentions Jahangir hunting at Nur-Chasma 38 times between 1613 and 1616.)
- Burhanpur Bagh-i Zaynabad Shikargah, Madhya Pradesh (Note: Awrangabadi and Ibn Shahnavaz, Ma'asir al-umara, vol. 1, page:158 mentions Shah Jahan hunting lions in shikargah, Burhanpur, 1630. Painting attributed to Daulat, c.1635, the Windsor Padshahnama, f.220b, RCIN 1005025.au.)
- Hissar-i-Firuza Shikargah, Haryana (Note: Akbar captures his first cheetah in 1560, Hissar Firuza shikargah. Painting by Tulsi and Narayan, c.1590–95. From an Akbarnama manuscript, IS.2:2-1896)
- Narwar Shikargah (Note: Abu’l-Fazl and Khwaja Nizam al-Din mention Akbar’s early forays into Gujarat to capture wild elephants in mid-1564 in the forests around Narwar and Gwalior a halting place)
- Pakpattan Shikargah Pakistan (Note: Abu’l-Fazl, Akbarnama, vol. 2, page:522 mentions that in 1571 Akbar had a similar spiritual experience at Pakpattan after visiting a Sufi saint; Painting by Miskina with Mansur portrays Akbar hunting in a qamargha ring in Lahore in 1567, c.1586, IS 2:56-1896; by Sarwan, c.1586, IS 2:55–1896. From an Akbarnama manuscript.)
- Mahemdavad Shikargah Ahmedabad, Gujrat (Note: Abu’l-Fazl, Ain-i-Akbari, vol. 2, 248 mentions Mahmud Tughlaq as founder of Mahemdavad Shikargah)
- Palam, Delhi Shikargah, New Delhi
- Sheikhupura (Jahangirpur/Jahangirabad) Shikargah, Lahore, Pakistan (Note: Jahangir, Jahangirnama, page 69;Jahangir, Tuzk-e-Jahangiri, vol. 1, pages:90–91, vol. 2, pages:182; Jahangir, Tuzk-e-Jahangiri, pages: 44, 318; See also Catherine Asher, Architecture of Mughal India (Cambridge: Cambridge University Press, 1992), pages:125–27 and 205. In 1607, Jahangir ordered the construction of a hunting tower, the Hiran Minar, dedicated to the memory of his favourite pet antelope which included a gateway, four corner pavilions, and an octagonal baradari pavilion at the end of a causeway in the middle of the large man-made reservoir He also built the village of Jahangirpur and fort by 1620.)

== Conservation of Shikargah ==
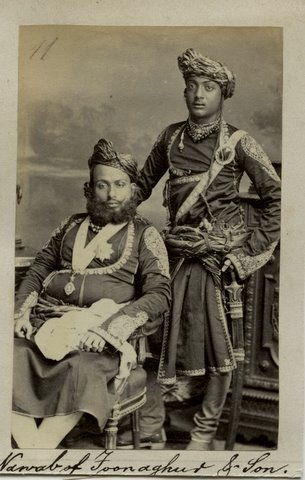
“But what has undoubtedly weighed with the Nawab of Junagadh in the past and carries weight also with me is that the forest is the last sanctuary of Indian lions,” said the last Nawab of Junagadh. Sixth Junagarh Nawab Mahabat Khanji II (1851-1888) in 1879 had banned the killing of the lions in Gir and his son Rasul Khanji (1892-1911) in 1892 banned the killing of the peacocks.

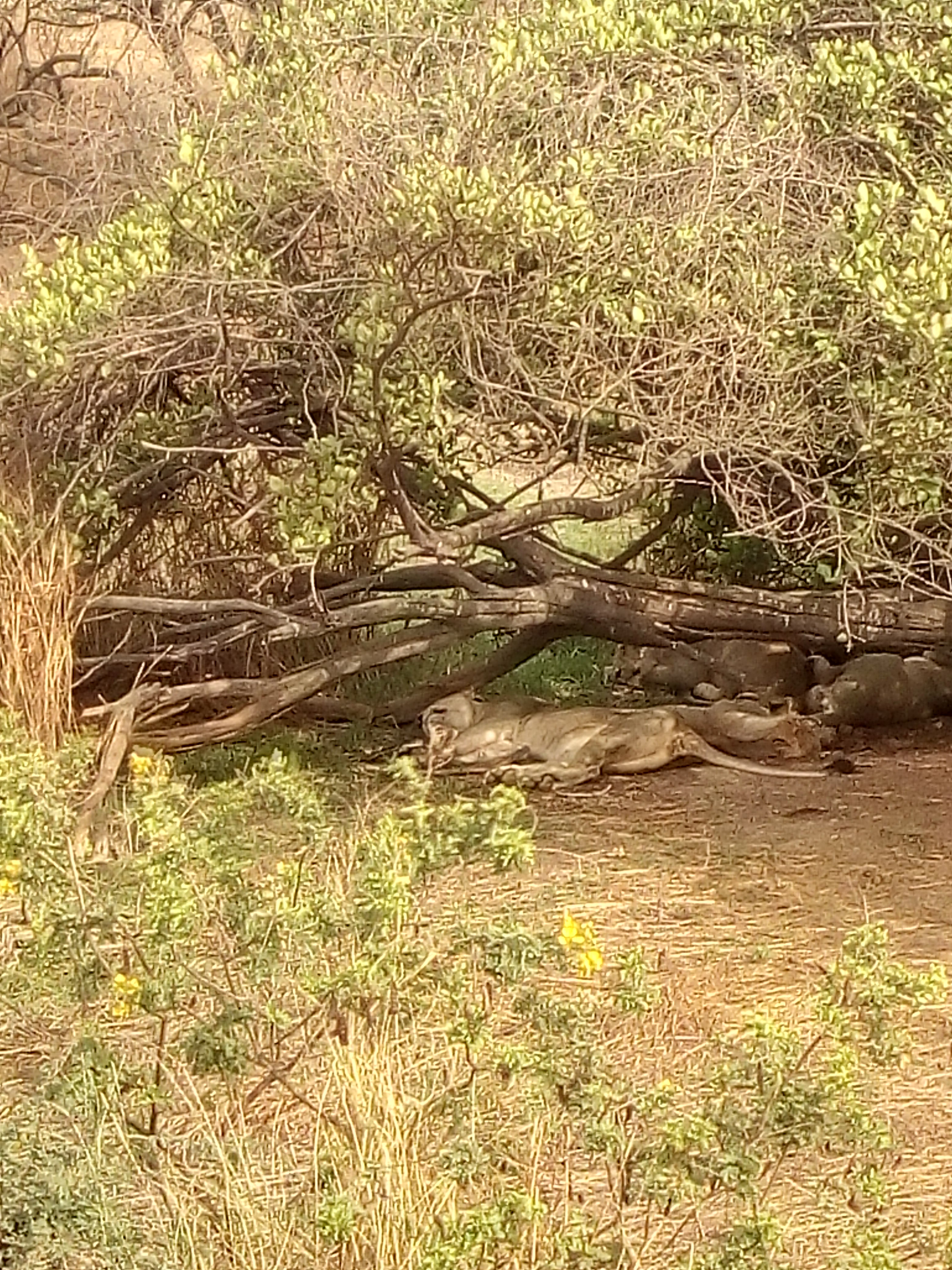
The only refuge of Asiatic lion is at Gir. The very first lion census in 1936 presented a total figure of lions as 287 which has increased to 674 as of 2020

Jim Corbett National Park established in 1932 was first Shikargah turned into a national park during British India, only 40,000 tigers were left during India's independence in 1947, the first-ever all-India tiger census conducted in 1972 revealed the existence of only 1,827 tigers. Realizing the gravity of dwindling number of seven major big cats of the world — tigers, lions, leopards, snow leopards, pumas, jaguars and cheetahs, Indian Govt enacted Wild Life (Protection) Act, 1972. As of December 2024, there are 58 protected areas that have been designated as tiger reserves., among which important tiger reserves where the numbers are more than 100 in each respectively are Uttrakhand State - Corbett and Rajaji, Uttar Pradesh State - Pilibhit and Dudhwa, Madhya Pradesh State - Bandhavgarh, Karnatka State - Nagarhole and Bandipur, Tamil Nadu State - Mudumalai, Assam State - Kaziranga, West Bengal State - Sunderbans. Today India boasts 104 national parks, 551 Wildlife Sanctuaries, 131 Marine Protected Areas, 18 Biosphere Reserves, 88 Conservation Reserves (58 Tiger Reserves) and 127 Community Reserves, covering a total of 1,65,088.57 sq km. In total, there are 870 Protected Areas which make 5.06% of the geographical area of the country where 3,682 big cats are estimated ranking India with topmost share of 75% worldwide in 2022.

== Shikargah Weave ==
Shikargah Benarsi Sari or weave is an evenly distributed group of designs that depict a hunting scene on fabric with a very fine balance between the positive (the motif) and the negative spaces (blank spaces) in rich and heavy brocade and festive colors (metallic shades in recent times)

== In popular culture ==
In movie The Deceivers (film) (1988), the hunting party scene includes the phrase: "There is no greater pleasure than the hunt, for it reveals the essence of life and death." This line reflects the cultural and philosophical undertones of the film, which explores themes of deception, power, and morality in colonial India.

== Gallery ==
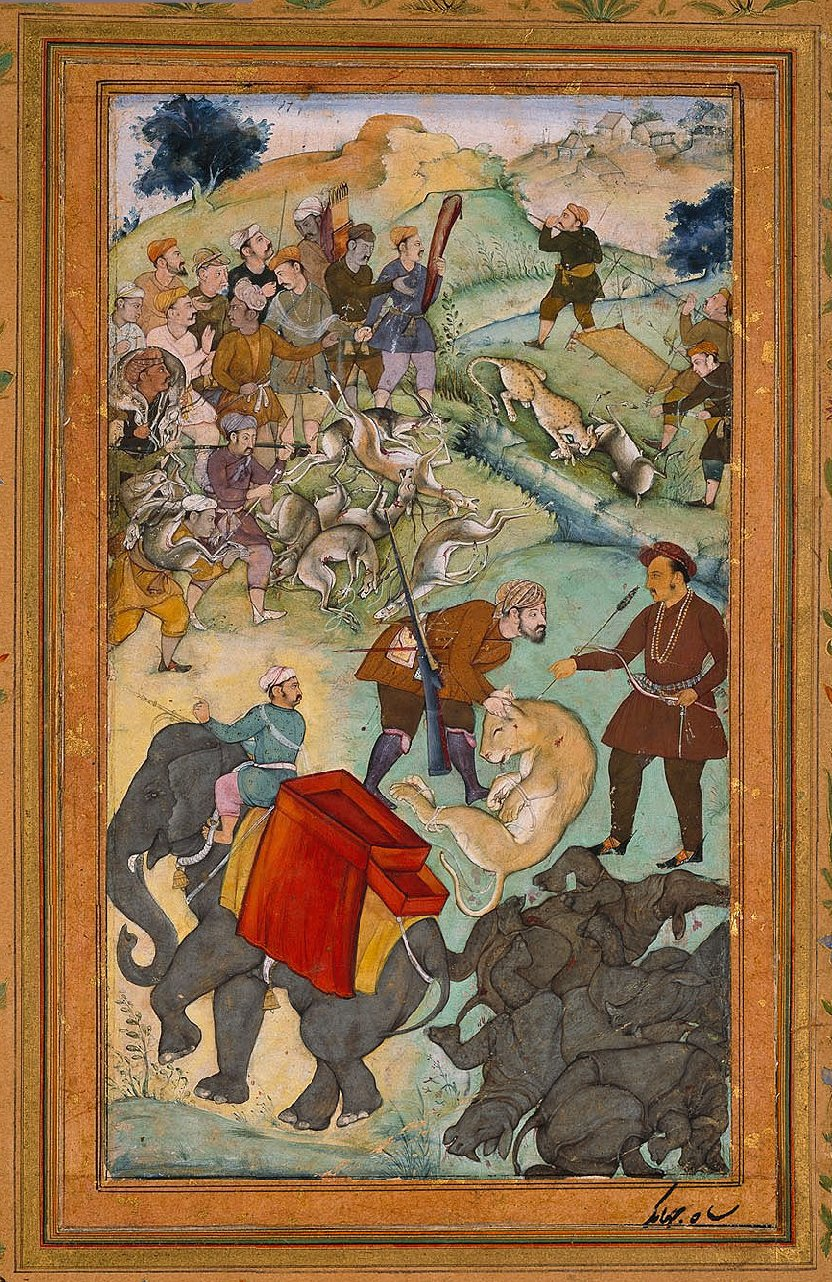
Salim_Kills_Rhinoceros_and_a_Lion

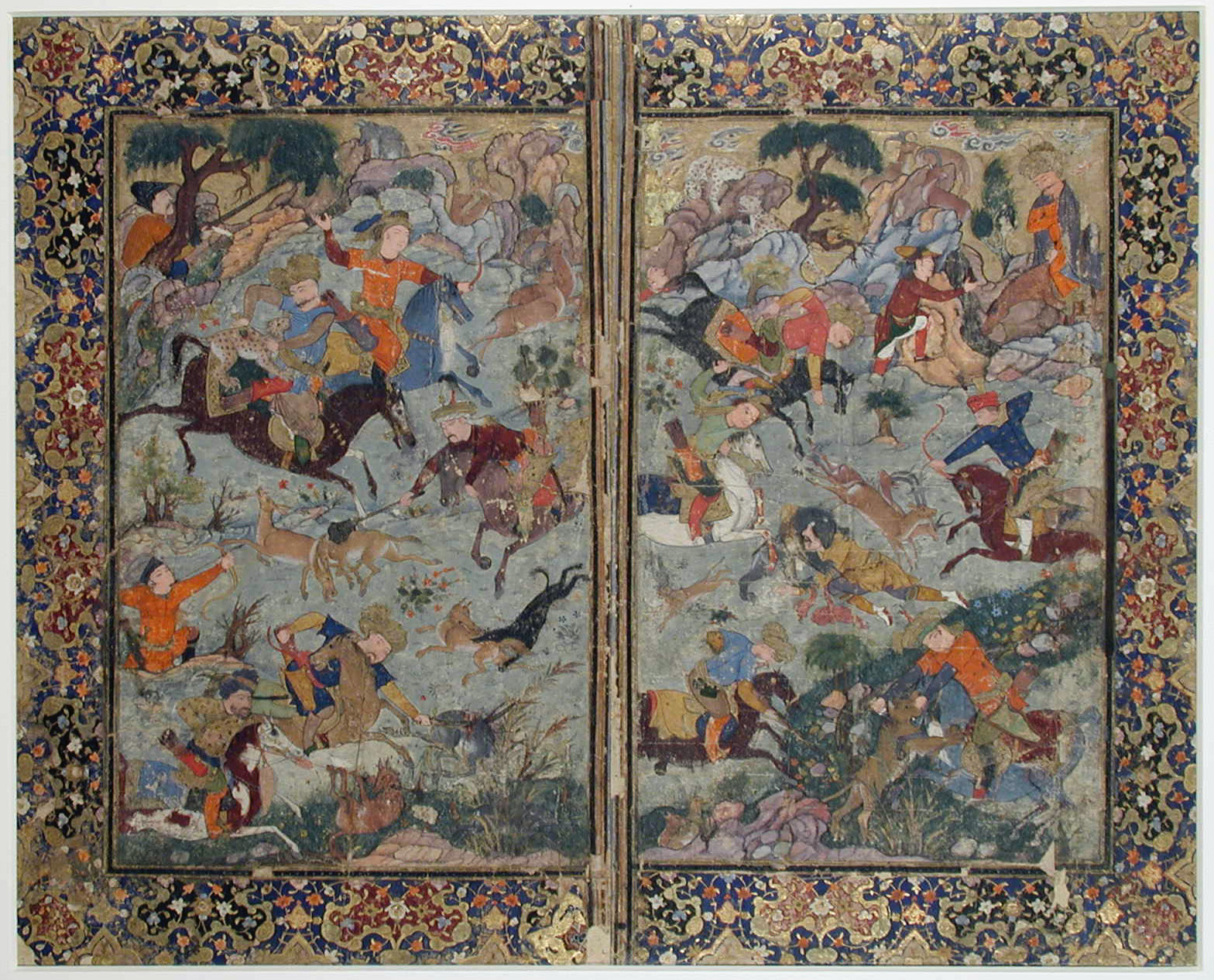
The_royal_hunt

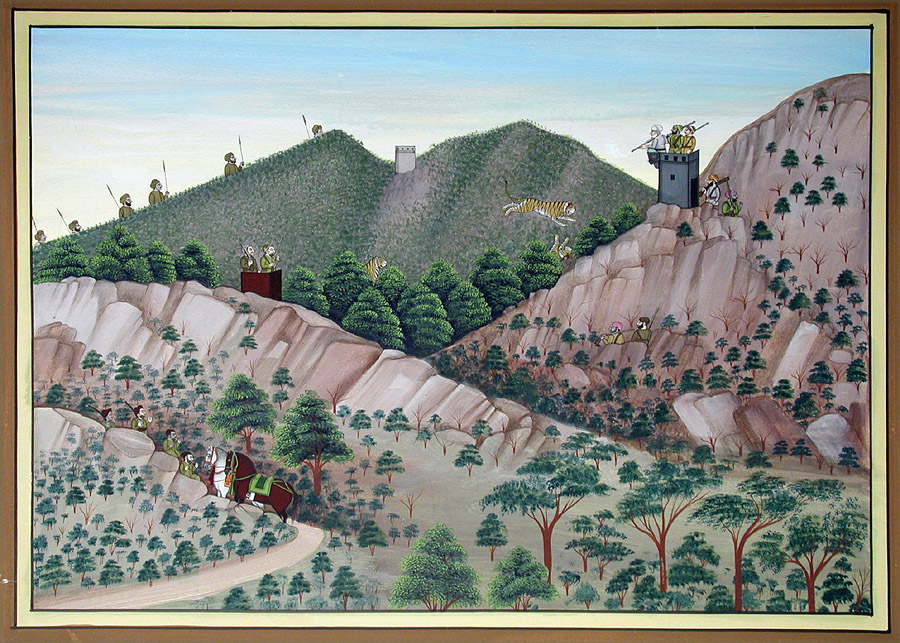
Tiger_hunt_in_the_mountains

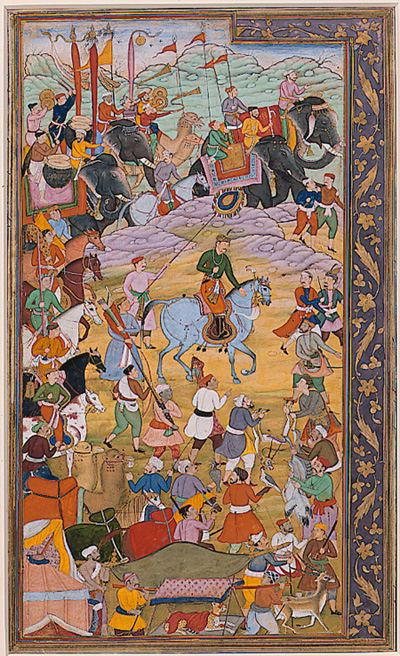
Akbar_hunts_at_Sanganer

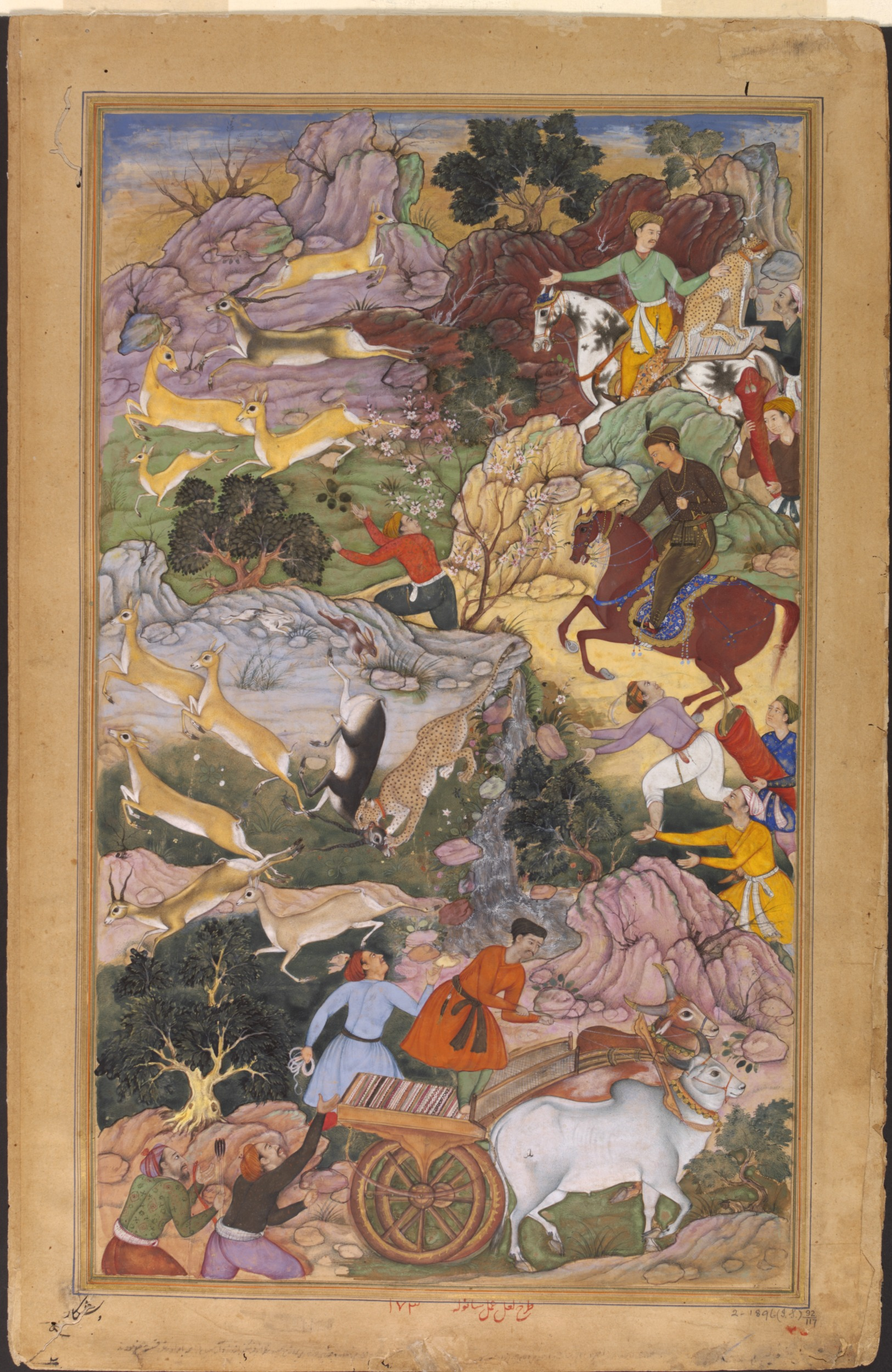
Akbar_Hunting_Black_Buck-Akbarnama

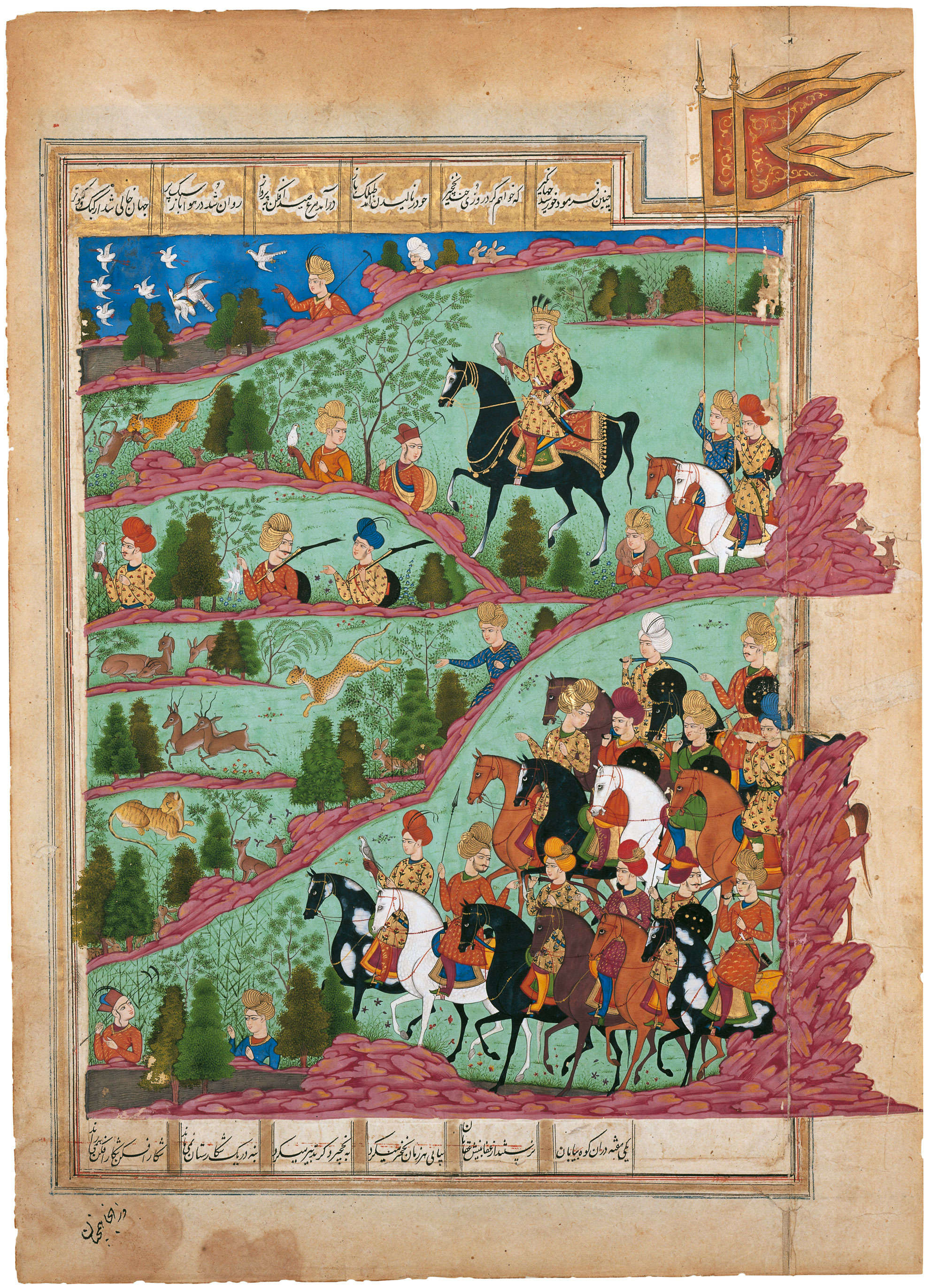
Shirin_praying_while_Khusrau_hunting

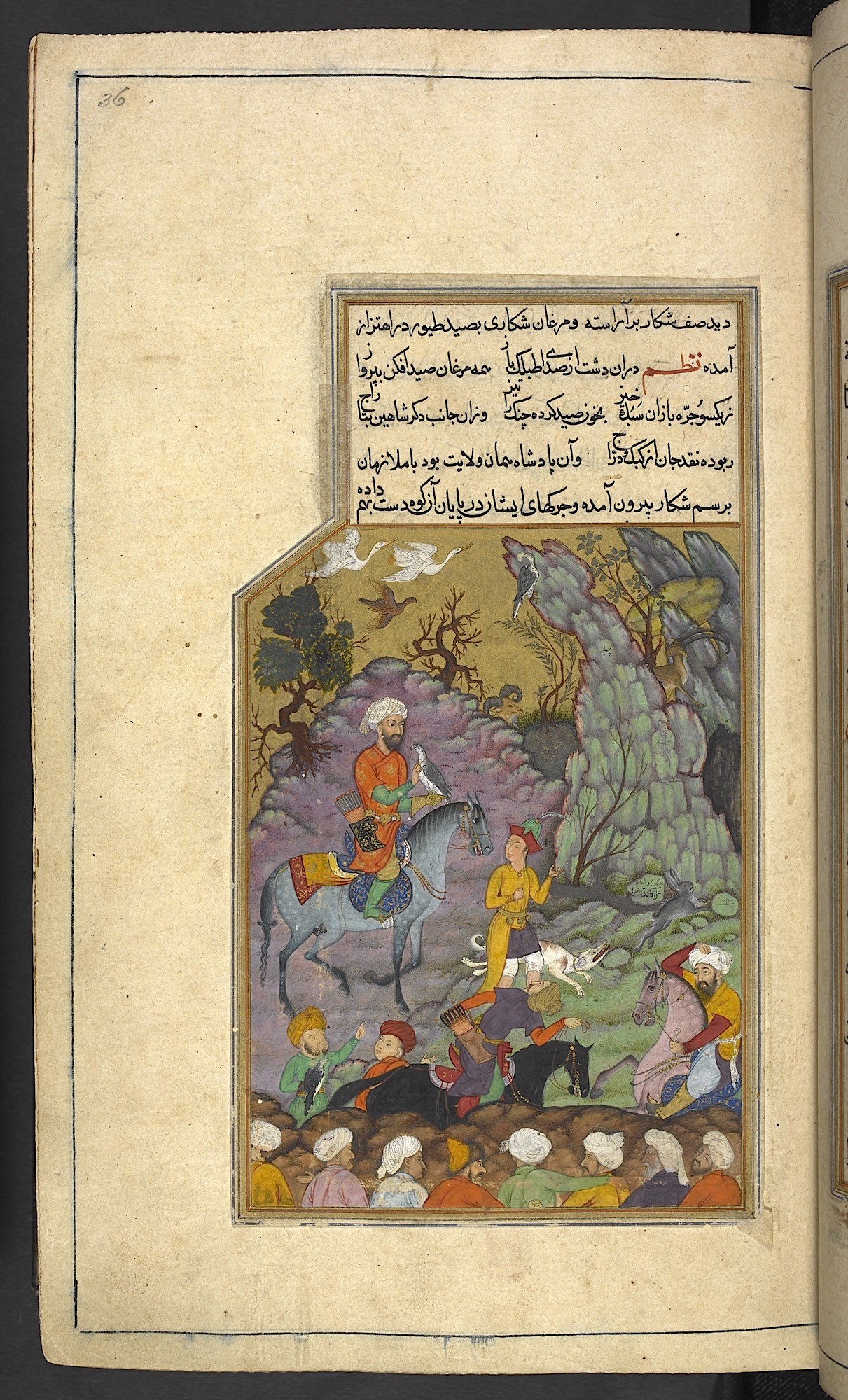
The_young_hawk_and_the_hunt

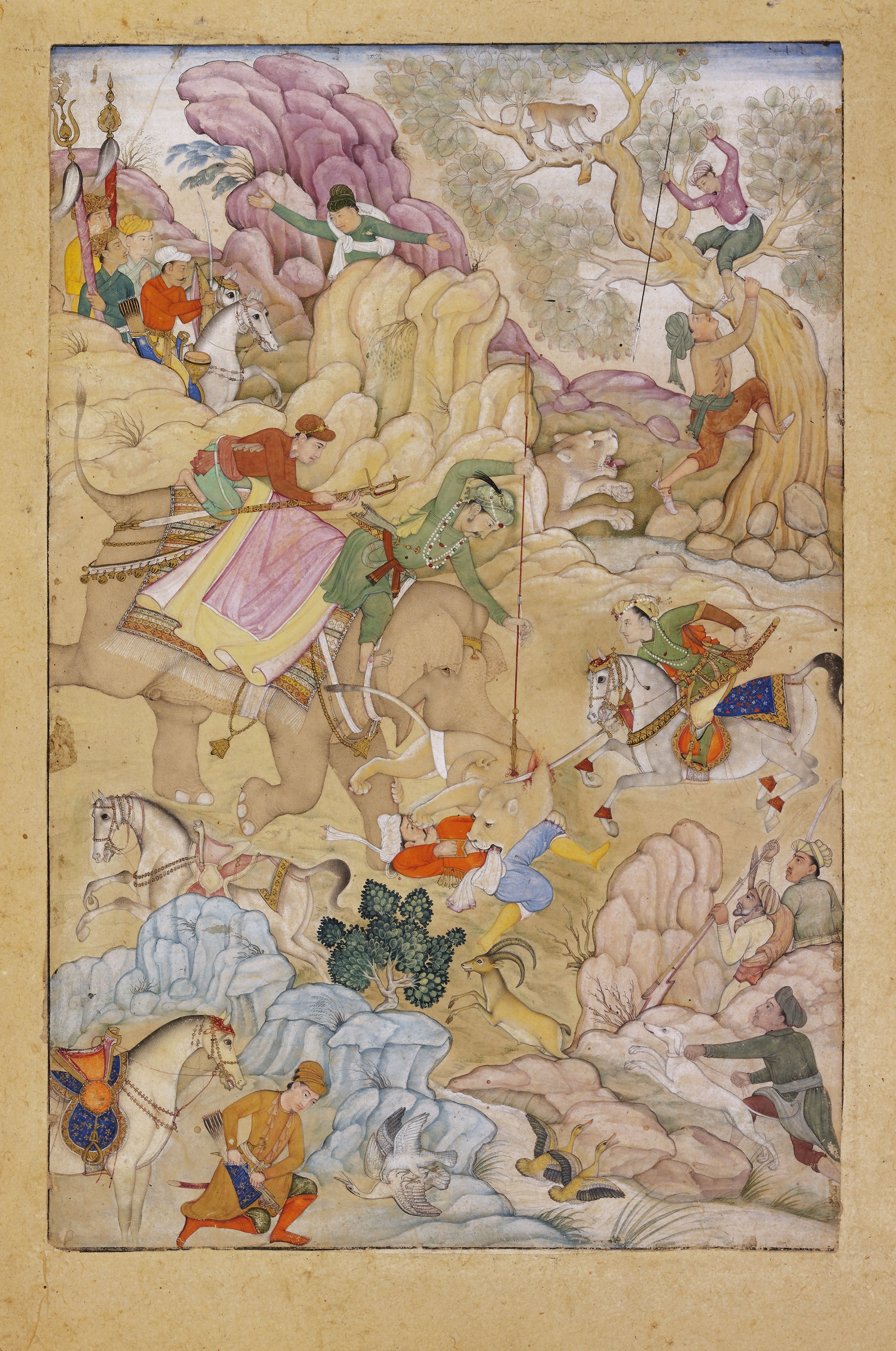
In 1615 (1024 A.H.), while based at Ajmer during his Mewar campaign, Jahangir undertook several lion hunts. He recorded killing Asiatic lions near Palam, Sambhar, and Bagar, all within the Ajmer–Sambhar–Merta region. One entry notes a lion troubling nearby villages and another describes a royal shikār party slaying two lions in the pargana of Palam.

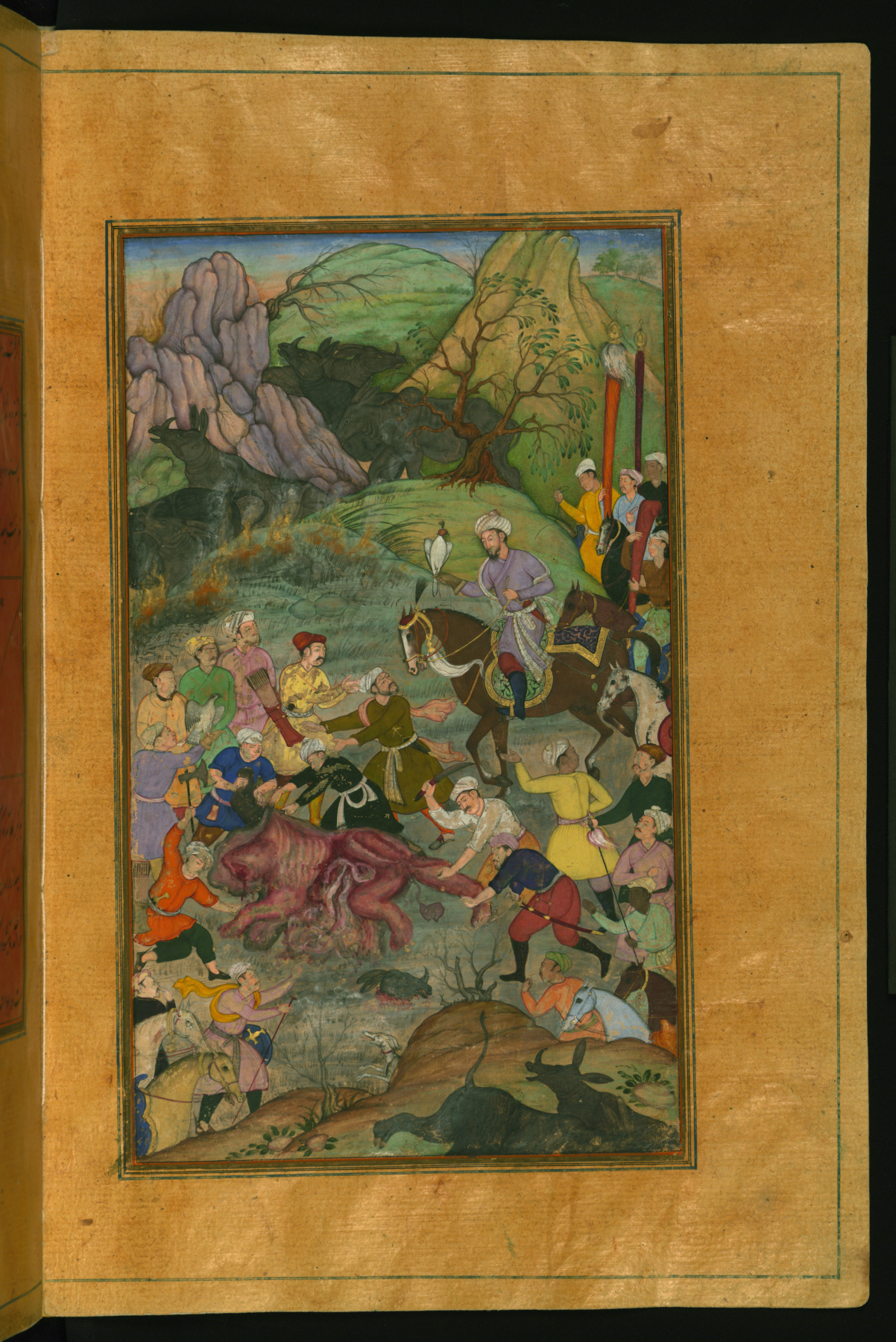
In 1519 CE (A.H. 925) while marching from Bajaur to Bhera, Babur recounts entering the Swat region (which he calls Sawāt or Swati). He and his men hunted rhinoceroses along the Panjkora and Swat Rivers, describing the valley as lush and wooded, with rhinoceroses thriving in its marshy tracts.
