= Duarte de Meneses =

Portuguese nobleman

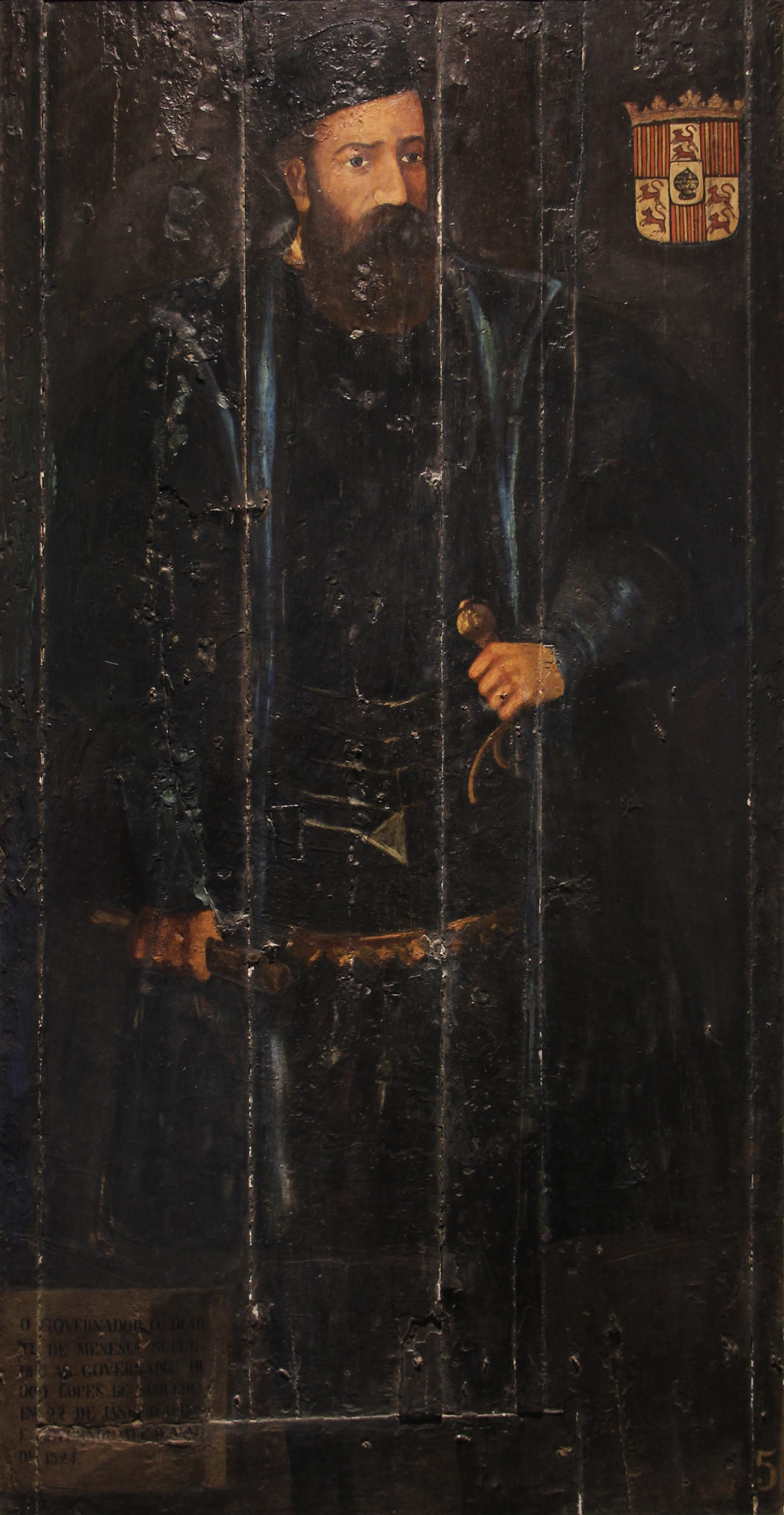

Governor of India
- In office 1522–1524
- Monarch: John III
- Preceded by: Diogo Lopes de Sequeira
- Succeeded by: Vasco da Gama

Personal details
- Born: Before 1488 Portugal
- Died: After 1539 Lisbon, Portugal
- Spouse: Filipa de Noronha
- Children: João de Meneses; Pedro de Meneses; Fernando de Meneses; Joana de Meneses; Inácia de Meneses; Brites de Meneses

Military service
- Allegiance: Portuguese Empire
- Battles/wars: Moroccan–Portuguese conflicts

Dom Duarte de Meneses (sometimes de Meneses) (before 1488 – after 1539) was a 16th-century Portuguese nobleman and colonial administrator, Governor of Tangier from 1508 to 1521 and 1536 to 1539, and Governor of India from 1522 to 1524.

== Background ==
D. Duarte de Meneses was the eldest son of the powerful noble D. João de Meneses, 1st Count of Tarouca and Prior of Crato, and his wife D. Joana de Vilhena. He was named after his renowned grandfather, Duarte de Menezes, 3rd Count of Viana, captain of Alcácer-Ceguer.

== Tangier ==
In 1508, Duarte de Meneses succeeded his father as Portuguese captain of Tangier, a function he had already been effectively performing in his father's name since 1507. He carved out a formidable reputation as a military leader in numerous engagements around Tangier.

== India ==
In 1521, D. Duarte de Meneses was named by King Manuel I of Portugal as the next governor of Portuguese India, succeeding Diogo Lopes de Sequeira. Duarte de Menezes left Lisbon in April, 1521, with an armada of 11 carracks destined for India. He was accompanied by his brother D. Luís de Menezes, who captained one of the ships. On the outgoing leg, Menezes's armada was joined by a squadron of four ships, commanded by Martim Afonso de Mello, destined for China. Menezes's armada arrived in Goa at the end of August, 1521. He assumed office in early 1522, upon the departure of his predecessor.

D. Duarte de Meneses tenure as governor was considered disastrous. Accused of corruption, he was arrested by his successor, Vasco da Gama, in 1524, and sent back to Portugal. He was imprisoned for nearly seven years in the castle of Torres Vedras, before being finally released by the intercession of powerful friends including D. António de Ataíde, Count of Castanheira.

== Tangier again ==
The rehabilitation of Duarte de Meneses was sufficiently complete that in October 1536, he managed to be appointed to his old post as governor of Tangier. He held that post until January, 1539, when he handed over the government to his son, D. João de Meneses.

Duarte de Meneses lived out the remainder of his days in Portugal.

Preceded by Diogo Lopes de Sequeira	Governor of Portuguese India; 1522–1524	Succeeded by Vasco da Gama
