= 1550 in India =

- Centuries: 15th; 16th; 17th; 18th
- Decades: 1530s; 1540s; 1550s; 1560s; 1570s
- See also: List of years in India; Timeline of Indian history

Events from the year 1550 in India.

== Events ==
- Afonso de Noronha becomes viceroy of India (until 1554)

== Births ==
- Achyuta Pisharati, Sanskrit grammarian, astrologer, astronomer and mathematician (died 1621)
- Vijnanabhiksu, philosopher (died 1600)
- Chand Bibi, warrior and acting Regent of Bijapur (1580–90) and regent of Ahmednagar (1596–99) (died 1599)
- Rodolfo Acquaviva, Italian Jesuit missionary at the court of Akbar is born (dies 1583)
- Ralph Fitch, merchant, early European traveller to India and the court of Akbar and consultant to the East India Company is born (dies 1611)

== Deaths ==
{death of nokialand}

== See also ==
- Timeline of Indian history

== See also ==
- Timeline of Indian history
