= 1541 in India =

- Centuries: 15th; 16th; 17th; 18th
- Decades: 1520s; 1530s; 1540s; 1550s; 1560s
- See also: List of years in India; Timeline of Indian history

Events from the year 1541 in India.

== Events ==
- Bhoi Dynasty of Orissa established by Govinda Vidyadhara who serves as its first leader until 1549. The dynasty continues until 1881

== Births ==
- 12 July; 1541 – Shooryansi Somnath Bandyopadhyay, Chakraborty King of Sandilya Gotra Bandyopadhyay Vanksha (d. 1648)

== See also ==
- Other events of 1541
- Timeline of Indian history
