= 1526 in India =

- Centuries: 15th; 16th; 17th; 18th
- Decades: 1500s; 1510s; 1520s; 1530s; 1540s
- See also: List of years in India; Timeline of Indian history

Events from the year 1526 in India.

== Incumbents ==
- Mughal emperor: Babur

== Events ==
- 21 April – The First Battle of Panipat is fought. Babur becomes Mughal emperor, invades northern India and captures Delhi, beginning the Mughal Empire, which lasts until 1757.
- Date unknown – The Siege of Sambhal occurs.
- Date unclear – The Siege of Calicut.
- Henrique de Meneses ends his governance of Portuguese India
- Lopo Vaz de Sampaio begins his governance of Portuguese India (which ends in 1529)
- Bahadur Shah of Gujarat first reign as sultan of Gujarat Sultanate begins (ends 1535)

== Deaths ==
- 21 April – Ibrahim Lodi, sultan of Delhi (birth date unknown)

== See also ==
- Timeline of Indian history
