= 1542 in India =

- Centuries: 15th; 16th; 17th; 18th
- Decades: 1520s; 1530s; 1540s; 1550s; 1560s
- See also: List of years in India; Timeline of Indian history

Events in India from the year 1542.

== Events ==
- Venkata I becomes the emperor of Vijayanagara Empire following the death of his father Achyuta Deva Raya
- Sadasiva Raya becomes the emperor of Vijayanagara Empire following the killing of his nephew Venkata I (until 1569)

== Births ==
- 6 October – Mariam uz-Zamani, Mughal emperess is born (dies 1623)
- 14 October – Akbar (Jalal-ud-Din Muhammad Akbar), later Mughal emperor (dies 1605)

== Deaths ==
- Achyuta Deva Raya emperor of Vijayanagara Empire (born 1529)

== See also ==
- Timeline of Indian history
