= 1536 in India =

- Centuries: 16th; 17th; 18th
- Decades: 1510s; 1520s; 1530s; 1540s; 1550s
- See also: List of years in India; Timeline of Indian history

Events from the year 1536 in India.

== Events ==
- The tomb of Jamal Kamali completed
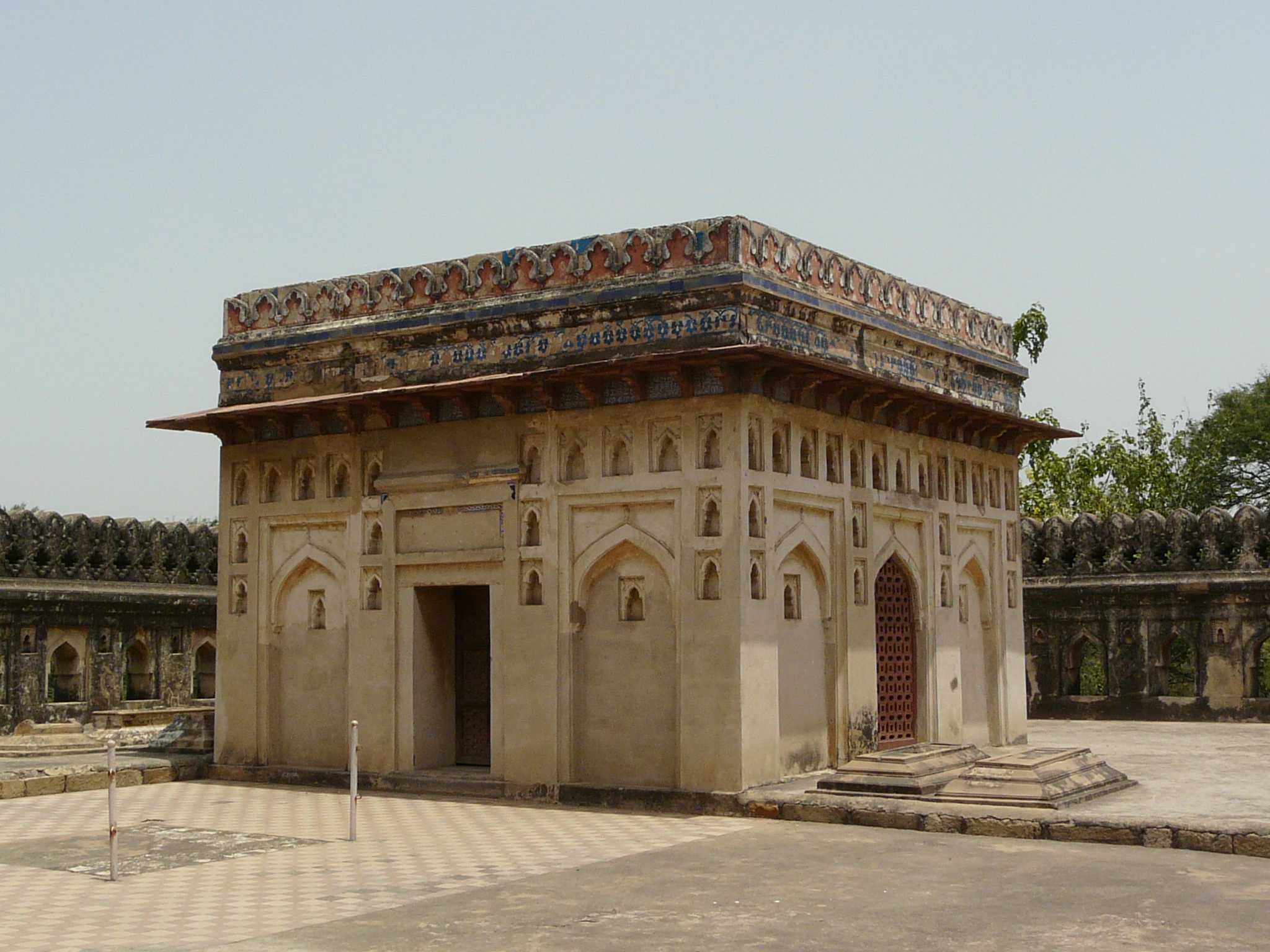
  The enclosed tomb of Jamail Kamali
- Bahadur Shah of Gujarat second reign as sultan of Gujarat Sultanate begins (ends 1537)

== Births ==
- Joao De Bustamante, pioneer of the art of printing in India, specifically in Goa is born (dies 1588).

== Deaths ==
- Jamali Kamboh, poet and Sufi of the Suhrawardiyya sect.
- Guru Jambheshwar, founder of the Bishnoi dies (born 1451)

== See also ==
- Timeline of Indian history
