= 1533 in India =

- Centuries: 15th; 16th; 17th; 18th
- Decades: 1510s; 1520s; 1530s; 1540s; 1550s
- See also: List of years in India; Timeline of Indian history

Events from the year 1533 in India.

== Events ==
- Alauddin Firuz Shah becomes ruler of the Sultanate of Bengal following his father's (Nasiruddin Nasrat Shah) death
- Ghiyasuddin Mahmud Shah becomes ruler of the Sultanate of Bengal following his nephew's (Alauddin Firuz Shah) assassination

== Births ==
- Sant Eknath writer born in Paithan (died 1599)

== Deaths ==
- Nasiruddin Nasrat Shah, sultan of Bengal
- Alauddin Firuz Shah, sultan of Bengal

== See also ==
- Timeline of Indian history
