= São Gabriel (ship) =

1497 portuguese carrack, flagship of Vasco de Gama's first voyage to India

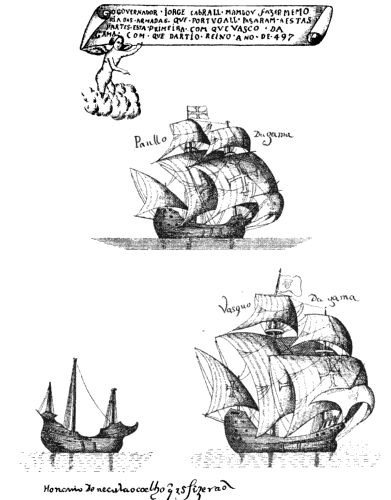
- São Gabriel is on the bottom right. This depiction from about 1558 also shows São Rafael (top) and Bérrio.

History

Portugal
- Name: São Gabriel
- Builder: Bartolomeu Dias
- Commissioned: 1497
- In service: 1497-1499
- Fate: unknown

General characteristics
- Class & type: Carrack
- Tons burthen: ~ 100 t
- Length: 25.7 m (84 ft 4 in)
- Beam: 8.5 m (27 ft 11 in)
- Draft: 2.3 m (7 ft 7 in)
- Propulsion: sail
- Complement: ~60
- Armament: 20 guns

São Gabriel was a Portuguese carrack and the flagship of Vasco da Gama's armada on his first voyage to India in 1497–1499.

== The other three ships ==
Velho indicated that the sources agreed that the armada contained four ships, but there was disagreement about the names. These were the other three ships according to him:

- São Rafael: The sister ship of São Gabriel, built by the same builder at the same time for the same purpose. It was of similar dimensions as São Gabriel. Paulo da Gama, Vasco's brother, was the captain, other people include João de Coimbra, pilot, and João de Sá, clerk.
- Bérrio, also known as São Miguel: This caravel was named after its former owner. Only carrying lateen sails, it was the smallest and swiftest of the convoy with a tonnage of 50–90 t. Key people were: Nicolau Coelho, captain, Pedro Escobar pilot, and Álvaro de Braga, clerk.
- A supply ship, name São Miguel: The ship was a carrack of about 110 or 200 tons with Gonçalo Nunes as captain.

== Provisions ==
The provisions of the convoy were based on the expectation that the voyage would last three years; merchandise intended for the Indian market was also brought along. This merchandise included wash basins, clothes, sugar, honey, corals, glass beads and trinkets, and turned out to be neither adequate in quality nor in quantity for its purpose. Daily rations were calculated to be 1.5 pounds biscuit, 1 lb beef or 0.5 lb of pork, 2.5 pints water, 1.25 pints wine (customary, also against scurvy), plus 0.3 gill of vinegar, and 0.6 gill of oil. On fasting days meat was substituted by rice, fish, or cheese. Other provisions included flour, lentils, sardines, plums, almonds, garlic, mustard, salt, honey, sugar. Fresh fish was caught en route, and supplies were replenished in harbors including oranges (to prevent scurvy).

The ships also carried a number of padrões, pillars of stone headed by the cross and bearing the seal of Portugal and used as markers to claim land.

== Operational history ==
The armada left Restelo near Lisbon on July 8, 1497. After rounding the Cape of Good Hope, the armada anchored at the Aguada de São Brás (Mossel Bay) where the supply ship was broken up and its contents distributed on the others. The three ships sailed further North along the African coast to Malindi, East Africa. After crossing the Indian Ocean they reached the harbor of Calicut at the Malabar coast in India on May 20, 1498.

The return crossing of the Indian Ocean took over three months and many of the crew members got sick from scurvy and died. With a diminished crew São Rafael became superfluous; the vessel was burned at East Africa after the transfer of its crew and provisions. The remaining two vessels got caught in a storm near the Cape Verde islands and separated. At that time both ships were leaking and in poor shape.

Bérrio under Nicolau Coelho's command arrived at Cascais near Lisbon on July 10, 1499, and São Gabriel without Gama and directed by João de Sá came in one month later. Gama had left São Gabriel on its final leg and commissioned another vessel to bring him with his dying brother Paulo to the Azores before he returned to Portugal in early September 1499.

== Cultural depictions ==
São Gabriel is depicted in the 2011 Indian film, Vasco da Gama.
