= 1581 in India =

- Centuries: 15th; 16th; 17th; 18th
- Decades: 1560s; 1570s; 1580s; 1590s; 1600s
- See also: List of years in India; Timeline of Indian history

Events from the year 1581 in India.

== Events ==
- Francisco de Mascarenhas becomes 13th Vice Regent of Portuguese India (until 1584)

== Deaths ==
- 1 September, Guru Ram Das, the fourth of the ten gurus of Sikhism dies in Goindval (born 1534)

== See also ==
- Timeline of Indian history
