= 1546 in India =

- Centuries: 15th; 16th; 17th; 18th
- Decades: 1520s; 1530s; 1540s; 1550s; 1560s
- See also: List of years in India; Timeline of Indian history

Events from the year 1546 in India.

== Events ==
- 20 April 1546 – 11 November 1546 – Second Siege of Diu occurs.
- 1546 - the Salimgarh Fort was constructed.

== See also ==
- Timeline of Indian history
