= 1534 in India =

- Centuries: 15th; 16th; 17th; 18th
- Decades: 1510s; 1520s; 1530s; 1540s; 1550s
- See also: List of years in India; Timeline of Indian history

Events from the year 1534 in India.

== Events ==
- Ismail Adil Shah reign (since 1510) as king of the Bijapur Sultanate ends with his death.
- Mallu Adil Shah reigns briefly as king of the Bijapur Sultanate before he dies.
- Ibrahim Adil Shah I becomes king of the Bijapur Sultanate (reigns until 1558).

== Births ==
- 24 September, Guru Ram Das, the fourth of the ten gurus of Sikhism is born (dies 1581)

== Deaths ==
- 27 August – Ismail Adil Shah, king of the Bijapur Sultanate (born 1498)
- Mallu Adil Shah, king of the Bijapur Sultanate
- Sri Chaitanya Mahaprabhu (born 1486)

== See also ==
- Timeline of Indian history
