= 1535 in India =

- Centuries: 15th; 16th; 17th; 18th
- Decades: 1510s; 1520s; 1530s; 1540s; 1550s
- See also: List of years in India; Timeline of Indian history

Events from the year 1535 in India.

== Events ==
- Siege of Chittorgarh Fort
- Bahadur Shah of Gujarat first reign as sultan of Gujarat Sultanate ends (began 1526)

== Births ==
- 19 January Mata Bhani, also known as Bibi Bhani, daughter of third Sikh guru Guru Amar Das, wife of fourth Sikh guru Guru Ram Das and mother of fifth Sikh guru Guru Arjan Dev is born (dies 1598)

== See also ==
- Timeline of Indian history
