= Estêvão da Gama (15th century) =

Portuguese knight, father of Vasco da Gama (c. 1430–1497)

- Born: c. 1430; Kingdom of Portugal
- Died: July 1497; Kingdom of Portugal
- Occupation: Knight
- Known for: Father of explorer Vasco da Gama
- Spouse: Isabel Sodre
- Children: Paulo da Gama; Vasco da Gama; Pedro da Gama; Aries da Gama; Teresa da Gama
- Parents: Vasco da Gama (father); Dona Teresa da Silva (mother)

Estêvão da Gama (about 1430–July 1497) was a wealthy Portuguese knight of the fifteenth century, best known as the father of explorer Vasco da Gama.

== Family and early life ==
Estêvão da Gama was the eldest son (out of four) of a certain Vasco da Gama of Olivença and Dona Teresa da Silva. In the 1460s, Estêvão was a knight in the household of the royal prince Infante Ferdinand, Duke of Viseu, and, at some point, entered the military Order of Santiago. He was subsequently rewarded for his services with the position of Alcaide Mor (civil governor) of Sines, a post he held until 1478. He continued collecting taxes and dues in Sines and environs on behalf of the Order of Santiago.

== Order of Santiago ==
Around 1472, the mastership of the Order of Santiago fell into the hands of Infante D. João, the royal prince and heir. Upon ascending to the throne as King John II of Portugal in 1481, the Order's fortunes - and Estêvão da Gama's - rose with him. Through the 1480s, Estêvão da Gama climbed through the ranks of the Order of Santiago, holding a variety of positions, and served John II in a position of trust. Estêvão held the comenda of Cercal and possibly Seixal on behalf of the Order.

== Marriage and family ==
Estêvão da Gama married Isabel Sodré, a daughter of João Sodré (also known as João de Resende), scion of a well-connected family of English origin. She was the sister of Vicente Sodré and Brás Sodré.

Estêvão da Gama and Isabel Sodré had five sons, in probable order of age, Paulo da Gama, João Sodré (who took his mother's surname), Vasco da Gama, Pedro da Gama and Aires da Gama, and one known daughter, Teresa da Gama (who became the wife of Lopo Mendes de Vasconcelos). In addition, Estêvão da Gama had an illegitimate son, confusingly also named Vasco da Gama, born of another woman while he was still single. Despite the Sodré's traditional attachment to the Order of Christ, the sons of Gama followed their father into the Order of Santiago.

== Service to John II ==
After Bartolomeu Dias doubled the Cape of Good Hope in 1488, Estêvão da Gama was appointed by John II to lead the first sea expedition from Portugal to India (at least according to chroniclers Barros and Castanheda). This expedition, however, did not materialize in the lifetime of either men.

In 1491, John II attentions became embroiled in a domestic struggle over his successor. Estêvão da Gama loyally backed John II's choice, Jorge de Lencastre (also the new grand master of the Order of Santiago), against the eventual winner, Manuel, Duke of Beja (also the grand master of the rival Order of Christ).

== Death, planned Indian voyage ==
At the death of John II in 1495, Estêvão da Gama and his sons remained part of the opposition party gathered around D. Jorge in Palmela, against King Manuel I. The new king resurrected John II's plans for the India expedition, and the appointment was, once again, to go to Estêvão da Gama, as had been earlier promised. But by the time the expedition was set to depart (July, 1497), Estêvão da Gama was already dead (or on his deathbed). As a result, the appointment was given to his son, Vasco da Gama.

(It is conjectured by some chroniclers that the appointment was first offered to Paulo da Gama, who as the eldest son, had the 'right' to succeed his father's position; but Paulo turned it down, so then it was offered to Vasco. However, Paulo seems to have changed his mind and agreed to captain one of the ships, under his younger brother's command.)

After Vasco da Gama's return in 1499, King Manuel I offered him his father's old base, the town of Sines, as a reward. However, actually taking possession of it turned out to be a bit more complicated.

== Namesakes ==
One of Vasco da Gama's sons, Estêvão da Gama, who would become Portuguese governor of India (1540–1542), was named for him.

There is a third Estêvão da Gama in the lists of this time - the one who led a squadrons of the 4th Armada (1502). He was a first cousin of Vasco da Gama - that is the son of Aires da Gama, a younger brother of the elder Estêvão.

== Sources ==
- Subrahmanyam, S. (1997) The Career and Legend of Vasco da Gama. Cambridge University Press
