= Vasco da Gama =

Portuguese explorer (c. 1460s – 1524)

His Lordship Vasco da Gama The Count of Vidigueira Admiral of the Seas of Arabia, Persia, India and the Entire Orient
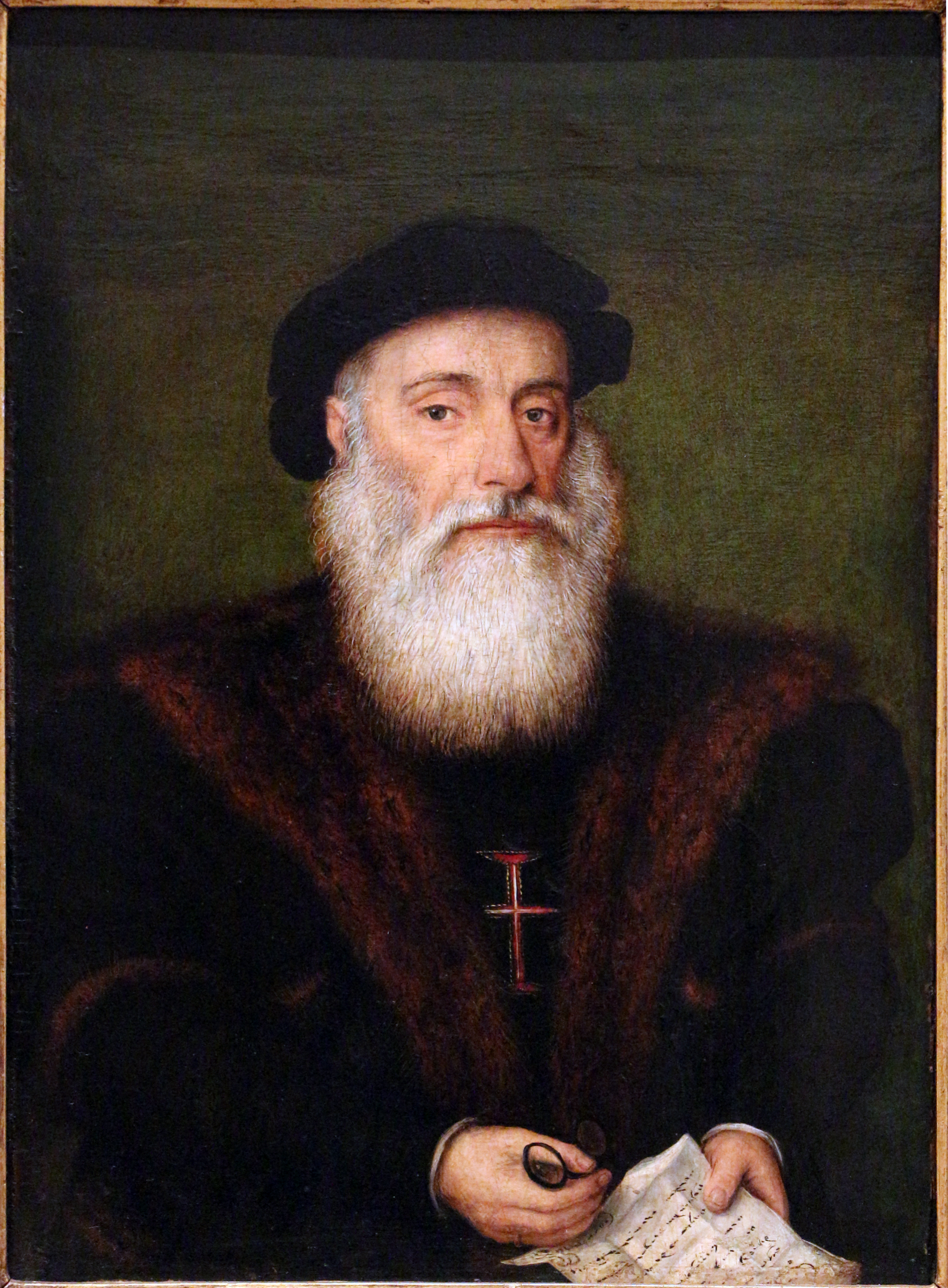
- Anonymous portrait, c. 1525

Viceroy of Portuguese India
- In office 5 September – 24 December 1524
- Monarch: John III
- Preceded by: Duarte de Menezes
- Succeeded by: Henrique de Meneses

Personal details
- Born: c. 1460 Sines, Alentejo, Kingdom of Portugal
- Died: 24 December 1524 Cochin, Kingdom of Cochin
- Cause of death: Malaria
- Resting place: Jerónimos Monastery, Lisbon, Portugal
- Spouse: Catarina de Ataíde
- Children: Estêvão da Gama, Governor of Portuguese India; Cristóvão da Gama, Captain of Malacca...among others
- Parents: Estêvão da Gama (father); Isabel Sodré (mother)
- Occupation: Explorer, Viceroy of India

Vasco da Gama (/ˌvæsku də ˈɡɑːmə, -ɡæmə/ VAS-koo də GA(H)M-ə, European Portuguese: [ˈvaʃku ðɐ ˈɣɐmɐ]; c. 1460s – 24 December 1524) was a Portuguese mariner, explorer, and nobleman. His discovery of the first maritime route between Europe and India—around the Cape of Good Hope, then across the Indian Ocean from Malindi in Kenya to Kozhikode—opened up European exploration of, and commerce with, India, and is considered a landmark event in world history.

Da Gama's first voyage (1497–1499) was the first to link Europe and Asia using an ocean route that rounded the southern tip of Africa, although he was not the first Portuguese mariner to round the Cape. This route allowed the Portuguese to avoid sailing across the disputed Mediterranean Sea and to trade with Eastern Arab Mediterranean ports that embarked goods from land routes across the dangerous Arabian Peninsula. A milestone in Portuguese maritime exploration, his voyage marked the beginning of a sea-based phase of international eastern trade and an age of global imperialism. His outward and return voyages constituted the longest known ocean voyages ever completed at the time. The Portuguese later established a long-lasting colonial empire along the route from Africa to Asia at the expense of the existing Arab eastern trade network.

Sailors had been trying to reach the Indies for decades, with thousands of lives and dozens of vessels lost in shipwrecks and attacks. Da Gama finally accomplished the feat when he landed at Kozhikode on 20 May 1498. Unchallenged access to the Indian spice routes boosted the economy of the Portuguese Empire, which was previously based along North and coastal West Africa. The main spices first obtained from Southeast Asia were pepper and cinnamon, but other commodities new to Europe were soon included in trade. Portugal maintained a commercial monopoly of these commodities for several decades. It was not until a century later that other European powers were able to challenge Portugal's monopoly and naval supremacy in the Cape Route.

Da Gama led two of the Portuguese India Armadas, the first and the fourth. The latter was the largest, and departed for India three years after his return from the first. As reward for his accomplishments, da Gama was appointed Governor of India in 1524, with the title of Viceroy, and was ennobled the Count of Vidigueira in 1519. He remains a leading figure in the history of exploration; homages worldwide have celebrated his explorations and accomplishments. The Portuguese national epic poem, Os Lusíadas, was written in his honor by Luís de Camões.

== Early life ==
Vasco da Gama was born in the town of Sines, one of the few seaports on the Alentejo coast in southwest Portugal. According to the Portuguese historian Teixeira de Aragão, he was born in a house near the church of Nossa Senhora das Salas. Some authors write that he was born in or around 1460, while others give 1469 as the year of his birth.

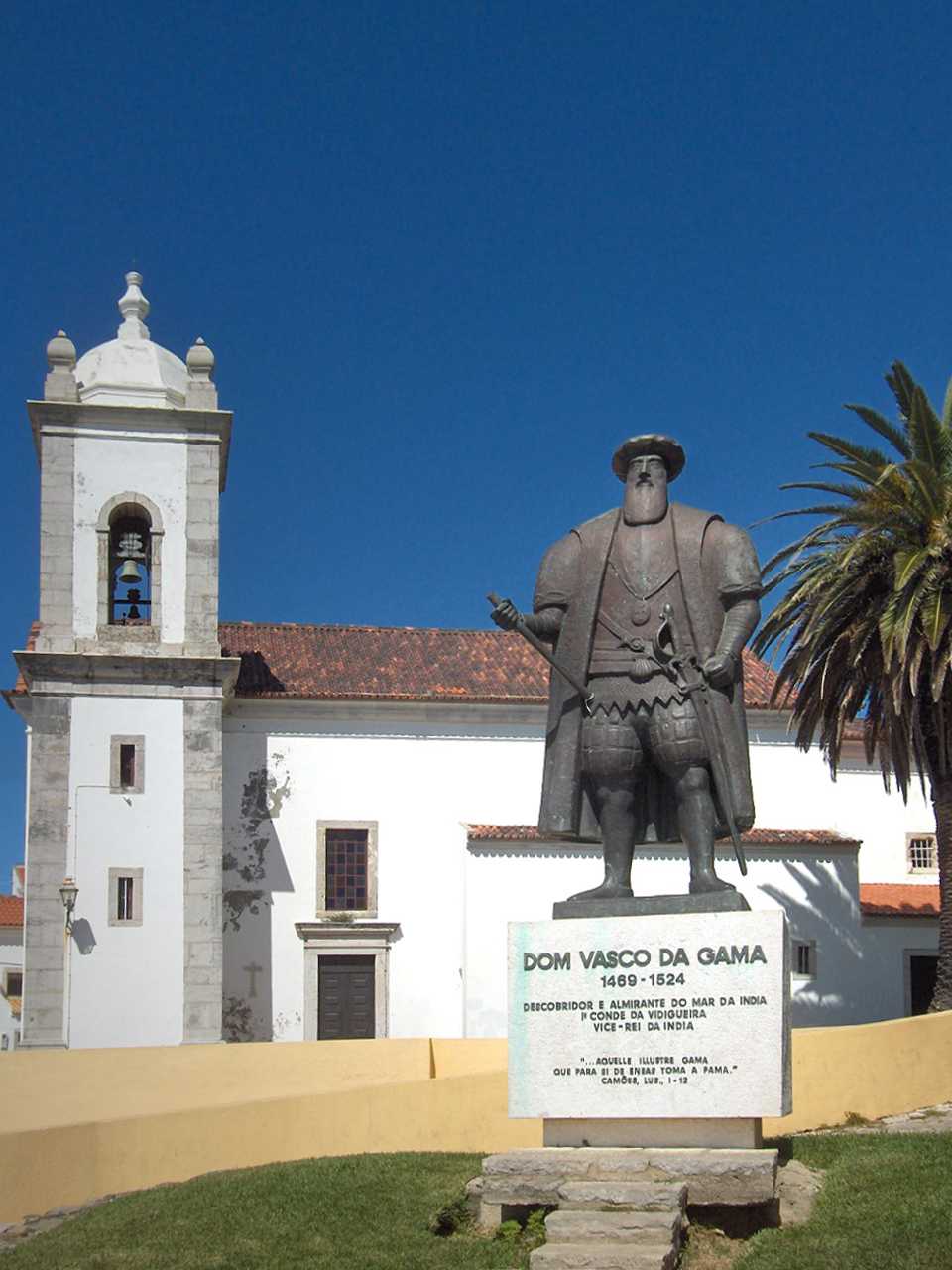
Bronze statue of Vasco da Gama at his birthplace, Sines, Portugal

Vasco da Gama's paternal grandfather and namesake was born in Olivença. Vasco's father was Estêvão da Gama, who had served in the 1460s as a knight of the household of Ferdinand, Duke of Viseu. He rose in the ranks of the military Order of Santiago. Estêvão da Gama was appointed alcaide-mór (civil governor) of Sines in the 1460s, a post he held until 1478; after that he continued as a receiver of taxes and holder of the Order's commendas in the region.

Estêvão da Gama married Isabel Sodré, a daughter of João Sodré (also known as João de Resende), scion of a well-connected family of English descent. Her father and her brothers, Vicente Sodré and Brás Sodré, had links to the household of Infante Diogo, Duke of Viseu, and were prominent figures in the military Order of Christ. Vasco da Gama was the third of five sons of Estêvão da Gama and Isabel Sodré – in (probable) order of age: Paulo da Gama, João Sodré, Vasco da Gama, Pedro da Gama and Aires da Gama. Vasco also had one known sister, Teresa da Gama, who married Lopo Mendes de Vasconcelos.

Little is known of da Gama's early life. Teixeira de Aragão suggests that he studied at the inland town of Évora, which is where he may have learned mathematics and navigation. Da Gama's near-contemporary Gaspar Correia and others have claimed that he studied under Abraham Zacuto, an astrologer and astronomer, but da Gama's biographer Sanjay Subrahmanyam thinks this dubious.

Around 1480, da Gama followed his father (rather than the Sodrés) and joined the Order of Santiago. The master of Santiago was Prince John, who ascended to the throne in 1481 as King John II of Portugal. John II doted on the Order, and the da Gamas' prospects rose accordingly.

In 1492, John II dispatched da Gama on a mission to the port of Setúbal and to the Algarve to seize French ships in retaliation for peacetime depredations against Portuguese shipping – a task that da Gama rapidly and effectively performed.

== Exploration before da Gama ==
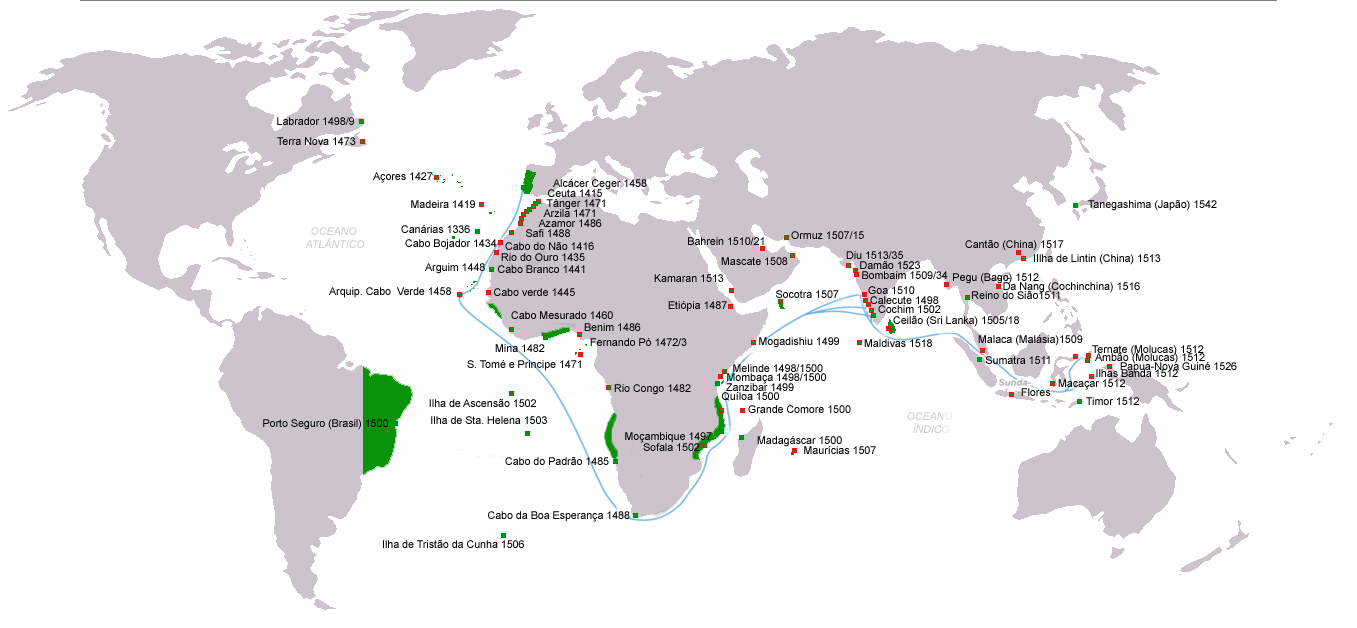
Portuguese discoveries and explorations: first arrival places and dates

From the earlier part of the 15th century, Portuguese expeditions organized by Prince Henry the Navigator had been reaching down the African coastline, principally in search of West African riches (notably, gold and slaves). They had greatly extended Portuguese maritime knowledge but had little profit to show for the effort. After Henry's death in 1460, the Portuguese Crown showed little interest in continuing this effort and, in 1469, licensed the neglected African enterprise to a private Lisbon merchant consortium led by Fernão Gomes. Within a few years, Gomes' captains expanded Portuguese knowledge across the Gulf of Guinea, doing business in gold dust, melegueta pepper, ivory and sub-Saharan slaves. When Gomes' charter came up for renewal in 1474, Prince John (the future John II), asked his father Afonso V of Portugal to pass the African charter to him.

Upon becoming king in 1481, John II of Portugal set out on many long reforms. To break the monarch's dependence on the feudal nobility, John II needed to build up the royal treasury; he considered royal commerce to be the key to achieving that. Under John II's watch, the gold and slave trade in West Africa was greatly expanded. He was eager to break into the highly profitable spice trade between Europe and Asia, which was conducted chiefly by land. At the time, this was virtually monopolized by the Republic of Venice, which operated overland routes via Levantine and Egyptian ports, through the Red Sea across to the spice markets of India. John II set a new objective for his captains: to find a sea route to Asia by sailing around the African continent.

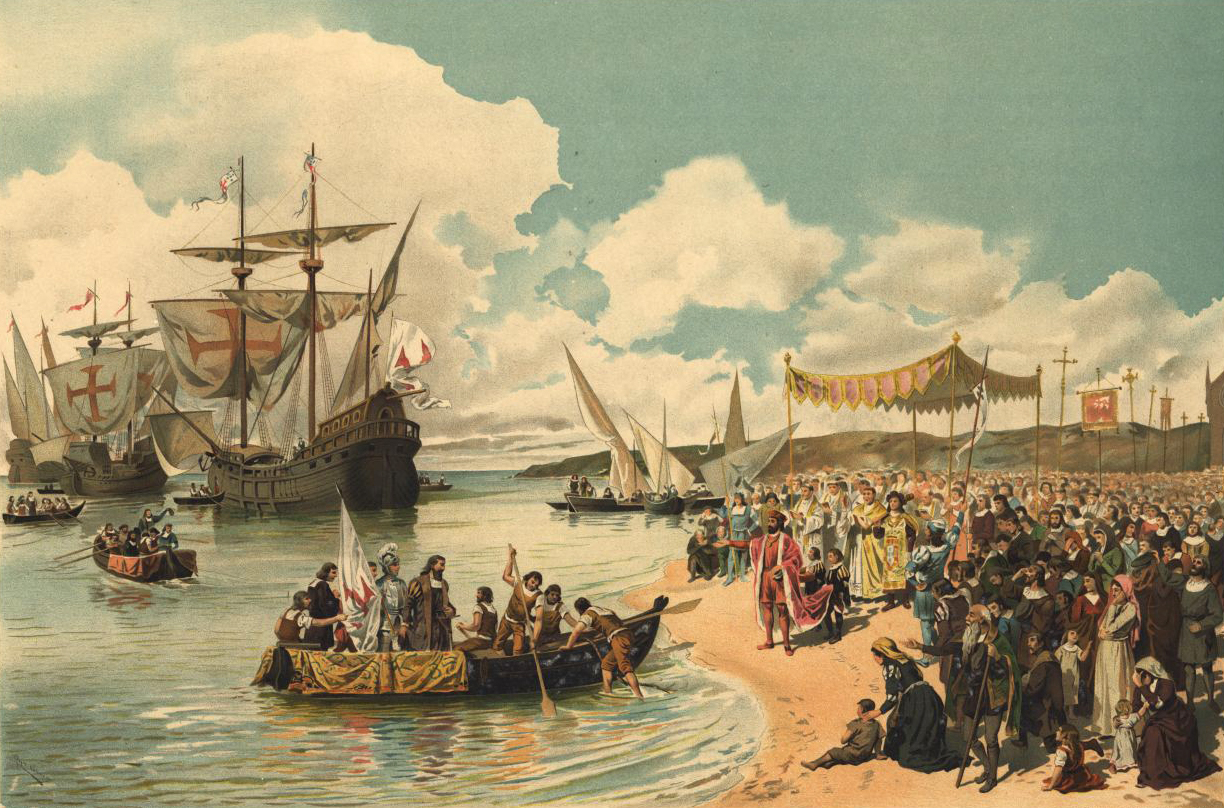
Vasco da Gama leaving the port of Lisbon, Portugal

By the time Vasco da Gama was in his 20s, the king's plans were coming to fruition. In 1487, John II dispatched two spies, Pero da Covilhã and Afonso de Paiva, overland via Egypt to East Africa and India, to scout the details of the spice markets and trade routes. The breakthrough came soon after, when John II's captain Bartolomeu Dias returned from rounding the Cape of Good Hope in 1488, having explored as far as the Fish River (Rio do Infante) in modern-day South Africa and having verified that the unknown coast stretched away to the northeast.

An explorer was needed who could prove the link between the findings of Dias and those of da Covilhã and de Paiva and connect these separate segments into a potentially lucrative trade route across the Indian Ocean.

== First voyage ==
The route followed in Vasco da Gama's first voyage (1497–1499)

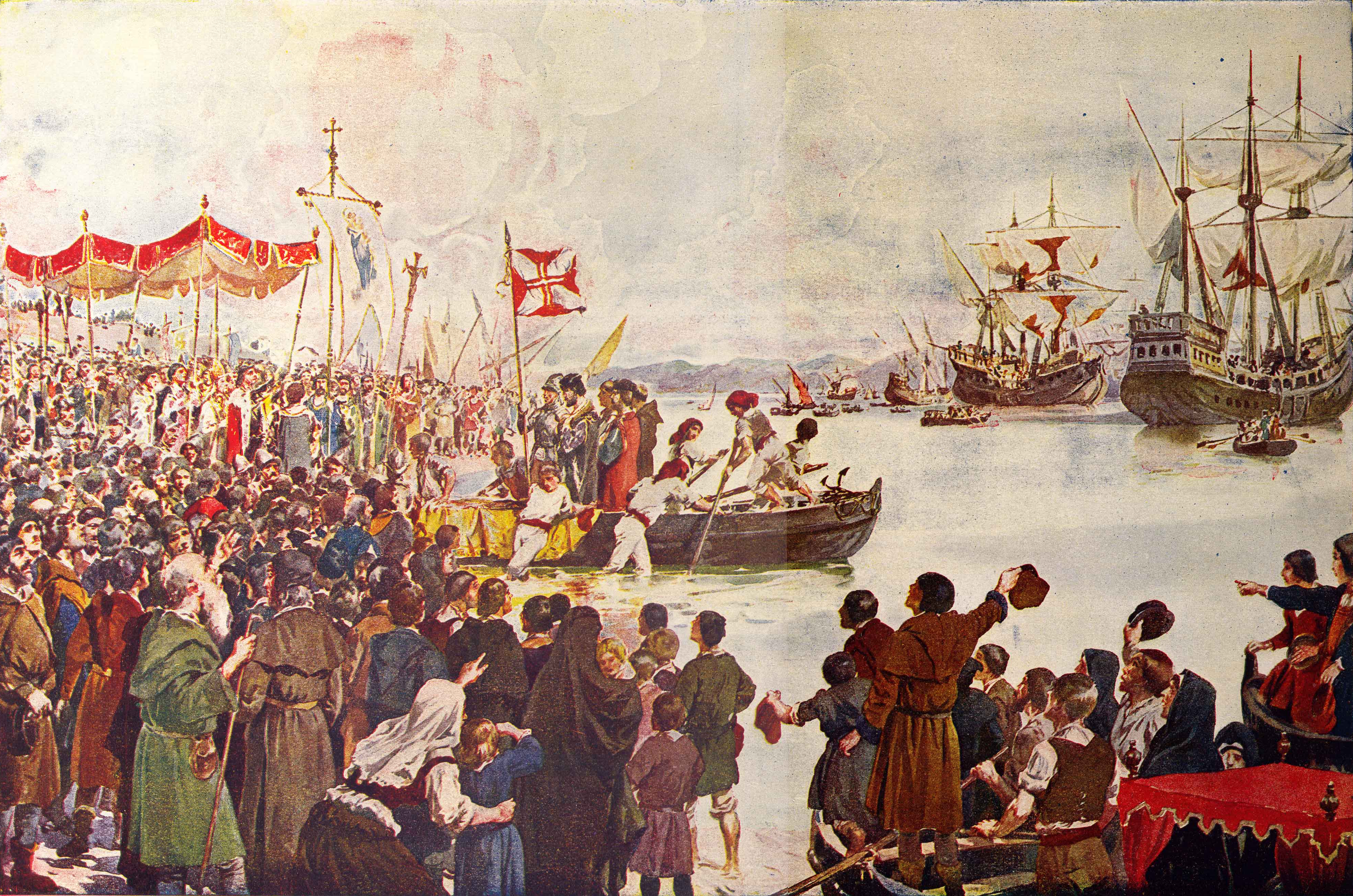
Departure of Vasco da Gama to India

On 8 July 1497 Vasco da Gama led a fleet of four ships with a crew of 170 men from Lisbon. The distance traveled in the journey around Africa to India and back was greater than the length of the equator. The navigators included Portugal's most experienced, Pero de Alenquer, Pedro Escobar, João de Coimbra, and Afonso Gonçalves. It is not known for certain how many people were in each ship's crew but approximately 55 returned, and two ships were lost. Two of the vessels were carracks, newly built for the voyage; the others were a caravel and a supply boat. The journey was taken under the Treaty of Tordesillas, which was papal supported demarcation from pole to pole 100 leagues (320 miles) west of Cape Verde Islands. The expeditions were meant to provide exclusive rights to all newly discovered and undiscovered lands in the west to Portuguese.

The four ships were:

- São Gabriel, commanded by Vasco da Gama; a carrack of 178 tons, length 27 m, width 8.5 m, draft 2.3 m, sails of 372 m^{2}
- São Rafael, commanded by his brother Paulo da Gama; similar dimensions to the São Gabriel
- Berrio (nickname, officially called São Miguel), a caravel, slightly smaller than the former two, commanded by Nicolau Coelho
- A storage ship of unknown name, commanded by Gonçalo Nunes, destined to be scuttled in Mossel Bay (São Brás) in South Africa

=== Journey to the Cape ===
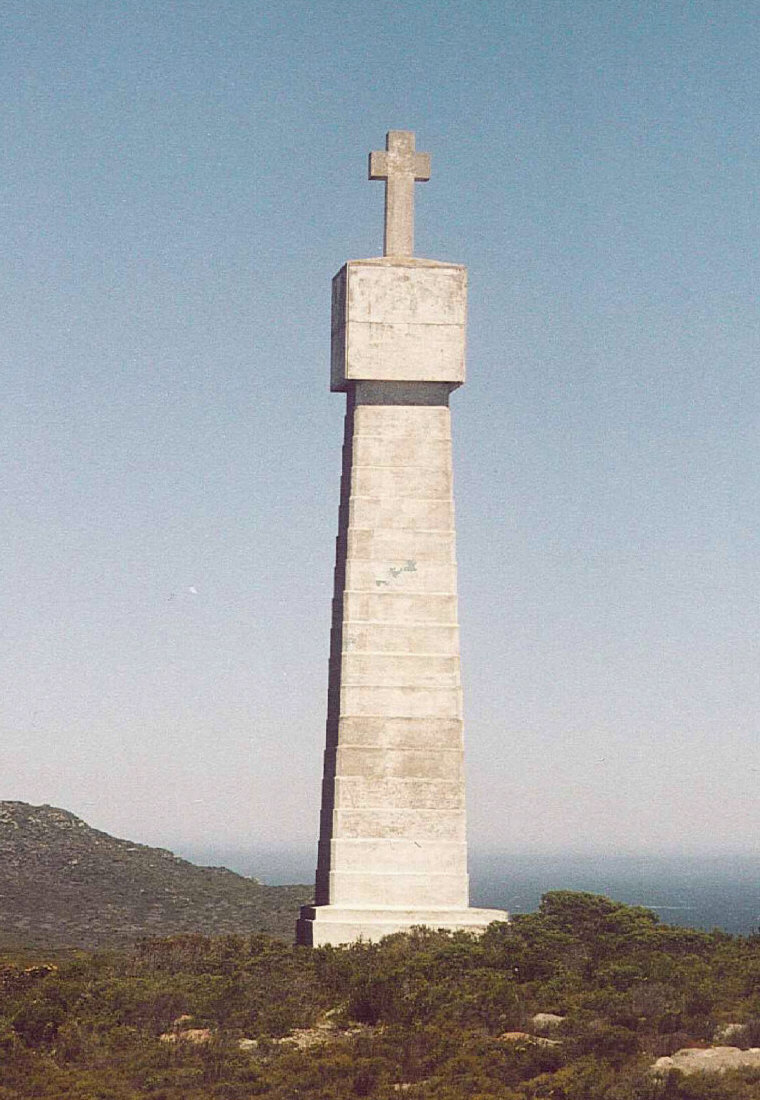
Monument to the Cross of Vasco da Gama at the Cape of Good Hope, South Africa

The expedition set sail from Lisbon on 8 July 1497. It followed the route pioneered by earlier explorers along the coast of Africa via Tenerife and the Cape Verde Islands. After reaching the coast of present-day Sierra Leone, da Gama took a course south into the open ocean, crossing the equator and seeking the South Atlantic westerlies that Bartolomeu Dias had discovered in 1487. This course proved successful and on 4 November 1497, the expedition made landfall on the African coast. For over three months the ships had sailed more than 10,000 kilometres (6,000 mi) of open ocean, by far the longest journey without landfall made by that time.

By 16 December, the fleet had passed the Great Fish River (Eastern Cape, South Africa) – where Dias had anchored – and sailed into waters previously unknown to Europeans. With Christmas pending, da Gama and his crew gave the coast they were passing the name Natal, which carried the connotation of "birth of Christ" in Portuguese.

=== Mozambique ===
Vasco da Gama spent 2 to 29 March 1498 in the vicinity of Mozambique Island. Arab-controlled territory on the East African coast was an integral part of the network of trade in the Indian Ocean. Fearing the local population would be hostile to Christians, da Gama impersonated a Muslim and gained audience with the Sultan of Mozambique. With the paltry trade goods he had to offer, the explorer was unable to provide a suitable gift to the ruler. Soon the local populace became suspicious of da Gama and his men. Forced by a hostile crowd to flee Mozambique, da Gama departed the harbor, firing his cannons into the city in retaliation.

=== Mombasa ===
In the vicinity of modern Kenya, the expedition resorted to piracy, looting Arab merchant ships that were generally unarmed trading vessels without heavy cannons. The Portuguese became the first known Europeans to visit the port of Mombasa from 7 to 13 April 1498, but were met with hostility and soon departed.

=== Malindi ===
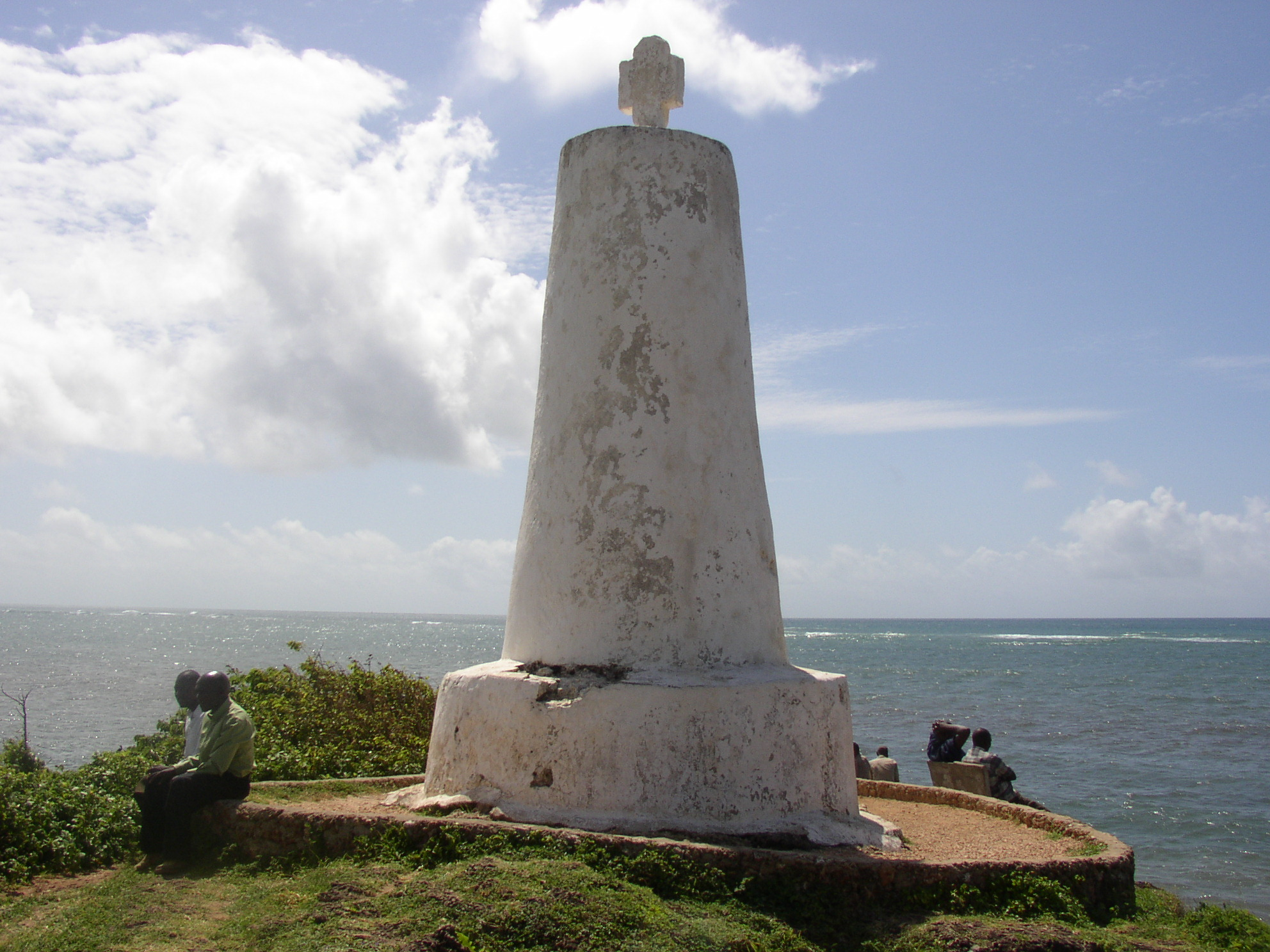
Pillar of Vasco da Gama in Malindi, in modern-day Kenya, erected on the journey

Vasco da Gama continued north, arriving on 14 April 1498 at the friendlier port of Malindi, whose leaders were in conflict with those of Mombasa. There, da Gama and his crew contracted the services of a Gujarati pilot who used his knowledge of the monsoon winds to guide the expedition the rest of the way to Kozhikode, located on the southwest coast of India. One now debased tale describes the pilot as the famous Arab navigator Ibn Majid, but other contemporaneous accounts place Ibn Majid elsewhere, and he could not have been near the vicinity at the time. Ibn Majid was also, at age 77, too old at the time to have made the journey. Vasco da Gama left Malindi for India on 24 April 1498.

=== Kozhikode, India ===
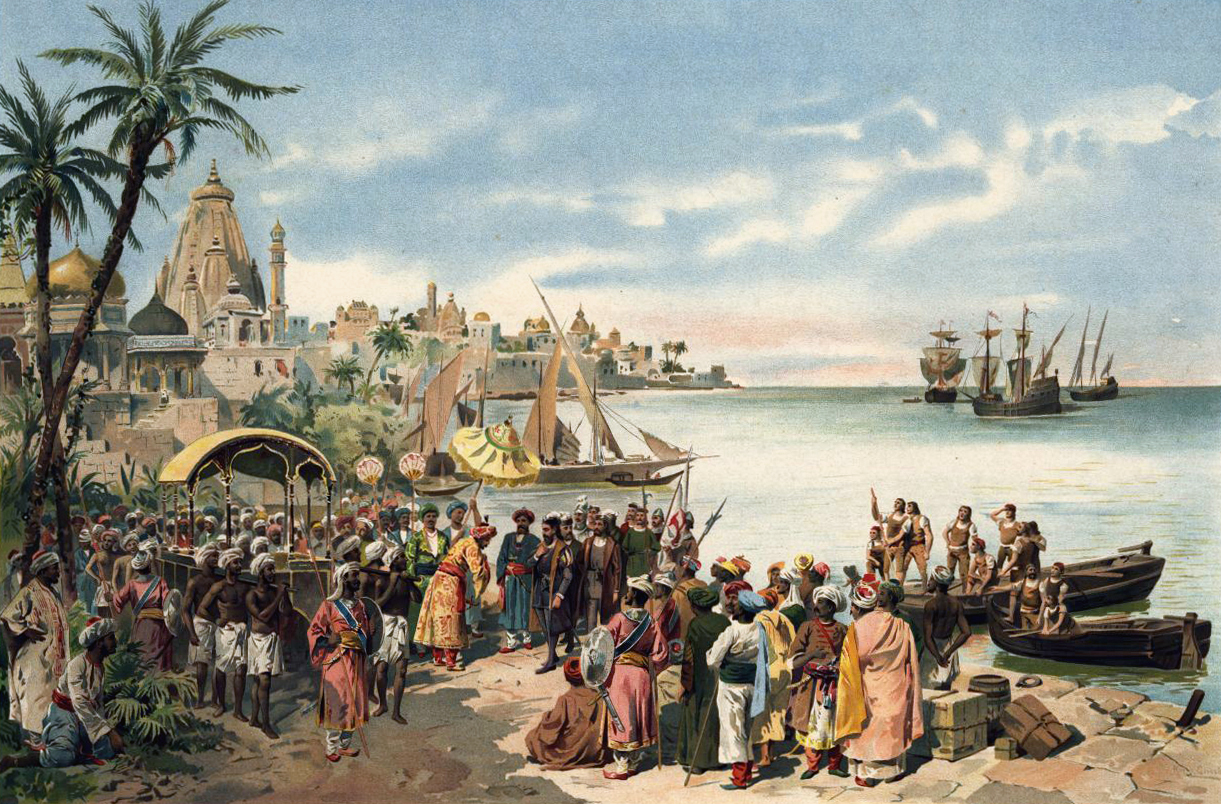
The arrival of Vasco da Gama at Calicut (Kozhikode), by Roque Gameiro, 1900

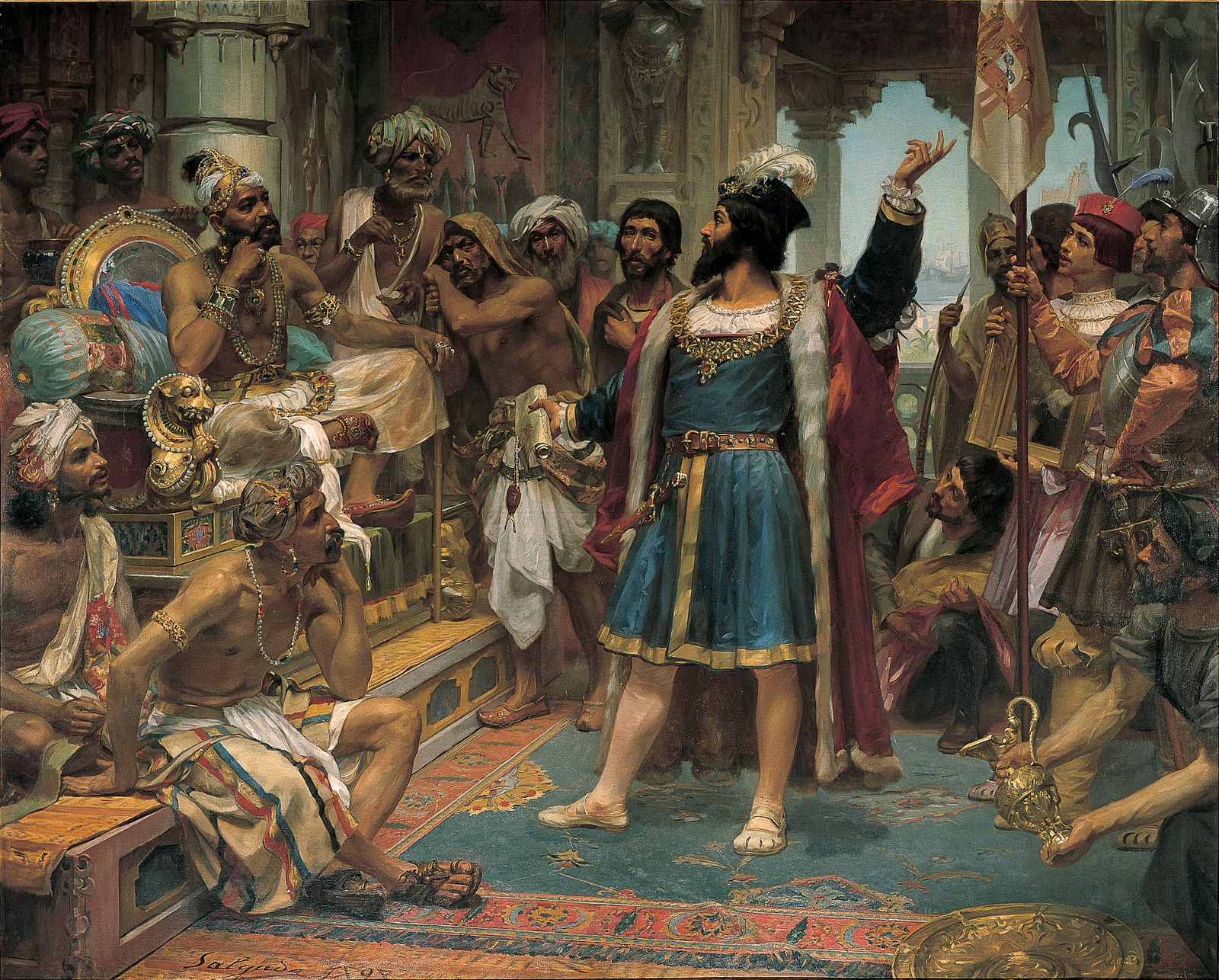
Vasco da Gama before the Zamorin of Calicut (Kozhikode), by Veloso Salgado, 1898

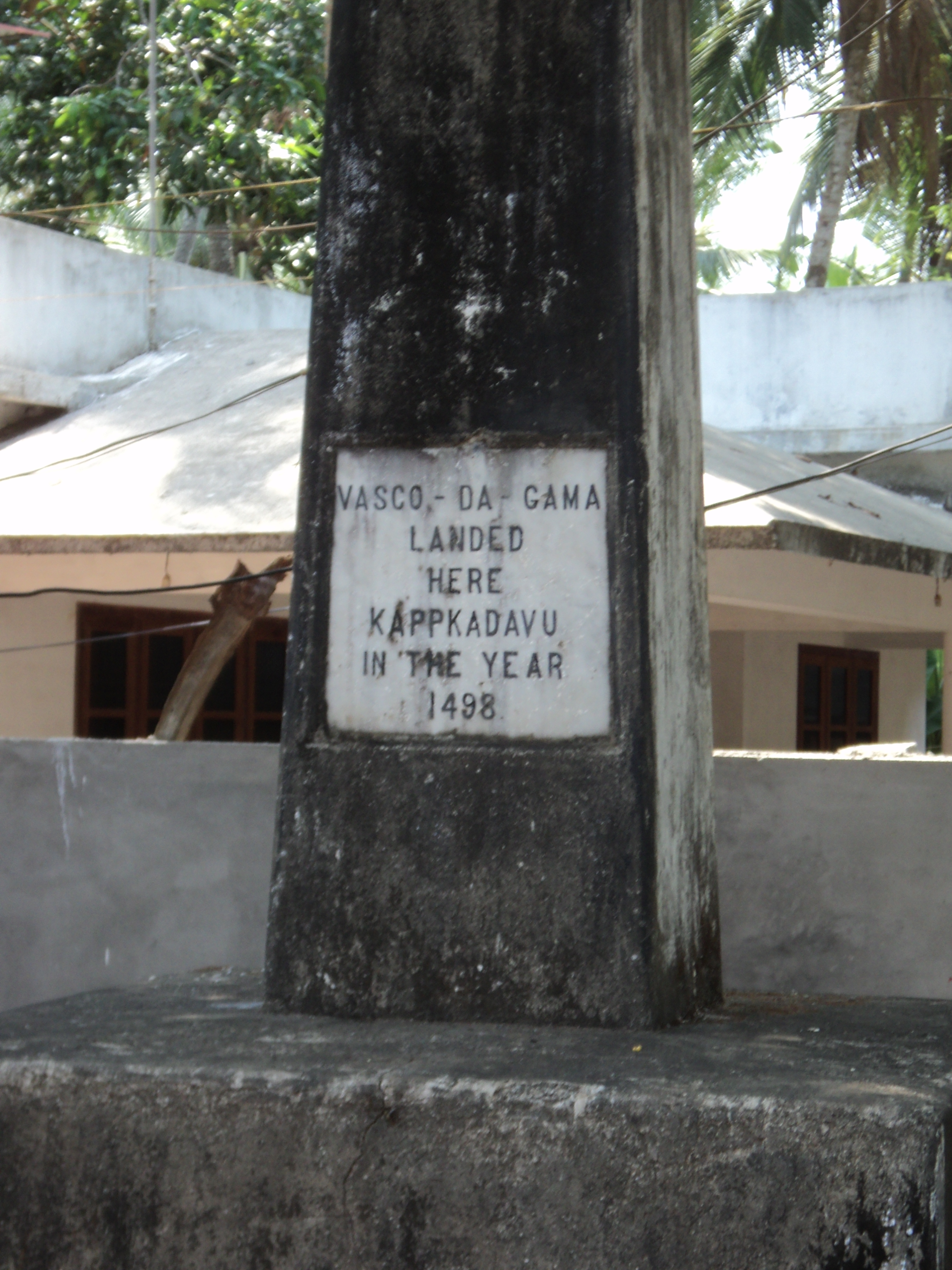
Landmark in Kappad, near Kozhikode

The fleet arrived in Kappadu near Kozhikode (known as Kozhikode at the time, subsequently known as Calicut and now renamed Kozhikode) on the Malabar Coast (present-day Kerala state of India) on 20 May 1498. The Zamorin (Samoothiri) of Kozhikode, who was at that time staying in his second capital at Ponnani, returned to the city on hearing the news of the foreign fleet's arrival. The navigator was received with traditional hospitality, including a grand procession of at least 3,000 armed Nairs, but an interview with the Zamorin failed to produce any concrete results. When local authorities asked da Gama's fleet, "What brought you hither?", they replied that they had come "in search of Christians and spices." For a moment he thought that he found long-lost Christians. He entered a temple, saw the statue of the Virgin Mary and fell on his knees in front of the statue. It turned out to be the Hindu goddess Parvati in a Brahmin temple. The presents that da Gama sent to the Zamorin as gifts from Dom Manuel – four cloaks of scarlet cloth, six hats, four branches of corals, twelve almasares, a box with seven brass vessels, a chest of sugar, two barrels of oil and a cask of honey – were trivial, and failed to impress. While the Zamorin's officials wondered at why there was no gold or silver, the Muslim merchants who considered da Gama their rival suggested that the latter was only an ordinary pirate and not a royal ambassador. Vasco da Gama's request for permission to leave a factor behind him in charge of the merchandise he could not sell was turned down by the King, who insisted that da Gama pay customs duty – preferably in gold – like any other trader, which strained the relation between the two. Annoyed by this, da Gama carried a few Nairs and sixteen fishermen (mukkuva) off with him by force.

According to several historians, Vasco da Gama's voyage to India was driven by religious and commercial objectives. The expedition was undertaken under the authority of Doctrine of Discovery, and the Portuguese Crown sought to spread Christianity, challenge Muslim dominance in the trade route of Indian Ocean, and get direct access to spice trade. Upon arriving in India the members of the da Gama's party declared that they had come "in search of Christians and spices".

=== Return ===
Vasco da Gama left Kozhikode on 29 August 1498. Eager to set sail for home, he ignored the local knowledge of monsoon wind patterns that were still blowing onshore. The fleet initially inched north along the Indian coast, and then anchored in at Anjediva island for a spell. They finally struck out for their Indian Ocean crossing on 3 October 1498. But with the winter monsoon yet to set in, it was a harrowing journey. On the outgoing journey, sailing with the summer monsoon wind, da Gama's fleet crossed the Indian Ocean in only 23 days; now, on the return trip, sailing against the wind, it took more than 90 days.

Da Gama saw land again only on 2 January 1499, passing before the coastal Somali city of Mogadishu, then under the influence of the Ajuran Empire in the Horn of Africa. The fleet did not make a stop, but passing before Mogadishu, the anonymous diarist of the expedition noted that it was a large city with houses of four or five storeys high and big palaces in its center and many mosques with cylindrical minarets.

Da Gama's fleet finally arrived in Malindi on 7 January 1499, in a terrible state – approximately half of the crew had died during the crossing, and many of the rest were afflicted with scurvy. Not having enough crewmen left standing to manage three ships, da Gama ordered the São Rafael scuttled off the East African coast, and the crew re-distributed to the remaining two ships, the São Gabriel and the Berrio. While there he was also granted permission by the Sultan to set up a padrão (a stone pillar). The Vasco da Gama Pillar, as it is still known locally, seems to be the only one of the many padrões set up by da Gama to survive to the present day.

After leaving Malindi, the sailing was smoother. By early March, the fleet had arrived in Mossel Bay, and crossed the Cape of Good Hope in the opposite direction on 20 March, reaching the western coast of Africa by 25 April.

The diary record of the expedition ends abruptly here. Reconstructing from other sources, it seems they continued to Cape Verde, where Nicolau Coelho's Berrio separated from Vasco da Gama's São Gabriel and sailed on by itself. The Berrio arrived in Lisbon on 10 July 1499 and Nicolau Coelho personally delivered the news to King Manuel I and the royal court, then assembled in Sintra. In the meantime, back in Cape Verde, da Gama's brother, Paulo da Gama, had fallen grievously ill. Da Gama elected to stay by his side on Santiago island and handed the São Gabriel over to his clerk, João de Sá, to take home. The São Gabriel under Sá arrived in Lisbon sometime in late July or early August. Da Gama and his sickly brother eventually hitched a ride with a Guinea caravel returning to Portugal, but Paulo da Gama died en route. Da Gama disembarked at the Azores to bury his brother at the monastery of São Francisco in Angra do Heroismo, and lingered there for a little while in mourning. He eventually took passage on an Azorean caravel and finally arrived in Lisbon on 29 August 1499 (according to Barros), or early September (8th or 18th, according to other sources). Despite his melancholic mood, da Gama was given a hero's welcome and showered with honors, including a triumphal procession and public festivities. King Manuel wrote two letters in which he described da Gama's first voyage, in July and August 1499, soon after the return of the ships. Girolamo Sernigi also wrote three letters describing da Gama's first voyage soon after the return of the expedition.

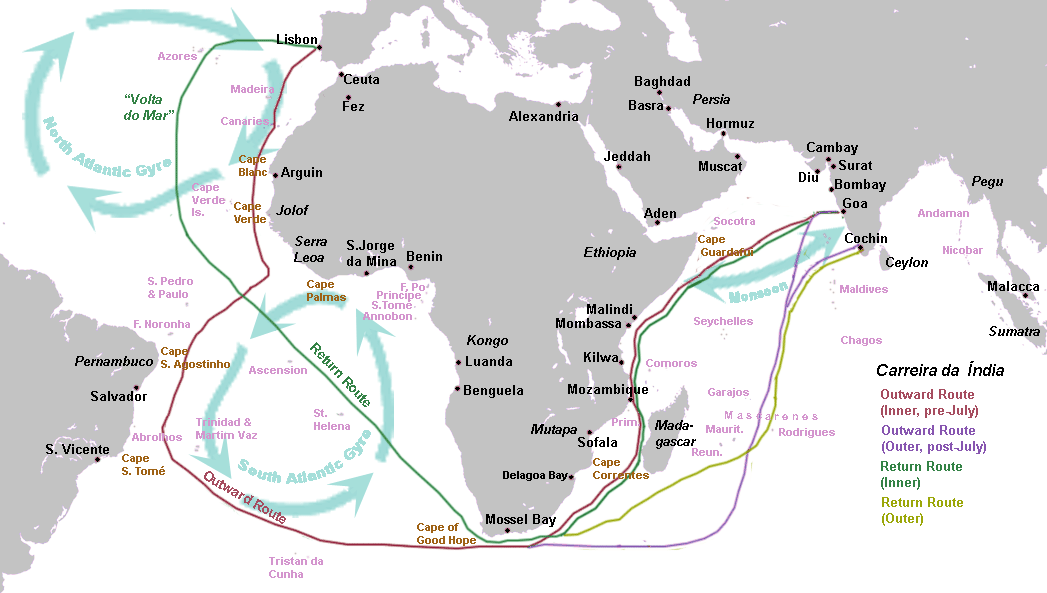
Outward and return voyages of the Portuguese India Run (Carreira da Índia). The outward route of the South Atlantic westerlies that Bartolomeu Dias discovered in 1487, followed and explored by da Gama in the open ocean, would be developed in subsequent years.

The expedition had exacted a large cost – two ships and over half the men had been lost. It had also failed in its principal mission of securing a commercial treaty with Kozhikode. Nonetheless, the small quantities of spices and other trade goods brought back on the remaining two ships demonstrated the potential of great profit for future trade. Vasco da Gama was justly celebrated for opening a direct sea route to Asia. His path would be followed up thereafter by yearly Portuguese India Armadas.

The spice trade would prove to be a major asset to the Portuguese royal treasury, and other consequences soon followed. For example, da Gama's voyage had made it clear that the east coast of Africa, the Contra Costa, was essential to Portuguese interests; its ports provided fresh water, provisions, timber, and harbors for repairs, and served as a refuge where ships could wait out unfavorable weather. One significant result was the colonization of Mozambique by the Portuguese Crown.

== Rewards ==
Vasco da Gama's signature (reads Ho Comde Almirante, "The Count Admiral")

In December 1499, King Manuel I of Portugal rewarded Vasco da Gama with the town of Sines as a hereditary fief (the town his father, Estêvão, had once held as a comenda). This turned out to be a complicated affair, for Sines still belonged to the Order of Santiago. The master of the Order, Jorge de Lencastre, might have endorsed the reward – after all, da Gama was a Santiago knight, one of their own, and a close associate of Lencastre himself. But the fact that Sines was awarded by the king provoked Lencastre to refuse out of principle, lest it encourage the king to make other donations of the Order's properties. Da Gama would spend the next few years attempting to take hold of Sines, an effort that would estrange him from Lencastre and eventually prompt da Gama to abandon his beloved Order of Santiago, switching over to the rival Order of Christ in 1507.

In the meantime, da Gama made do with a substantial hereditary royal pension of 300,000 reis. He was awarded the noble title of Dom (lord) in perpetuity for himself, his siblings and their descendants. On 30 January 1502, da Gama was awarded the title of Almirante dos mares de Arabia, Persia, India e de todo o Oriente ("Admiral of the Seas of Arabia, Persia, India and all the Orient") – an overwrought title reminiscent of the ornate Castilian title borne by Christopher Columbus. Another royal letter, dated October 1501, gave da Gama the personal right to intervene and exercise a determining role on any future India-bound fleet.

Around 1501, Vasco da Gama married Catarina de Ataíde, daughter of Álvaro de Ataíde, the alcaide-mór of Alvor (Algarve), and a prominent nobleman connected by kinship with the powerful Almeida family (Catarina was a first cousin of Dom Francisco de Almeida).

== Second voyage ==
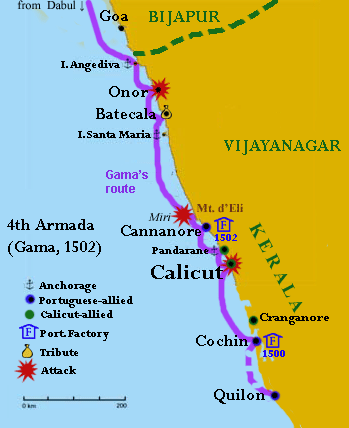
Malabar Coast of India, c. 1500, showing the path of Vasco da Gama's 4th India Armada in 1502

The follow-up expedition, the Second India Armada, launched in 1500 under the command of Pedro Álvares Cabral with the mission of making a treaty with the Zamorin of Kozhikodeand setting up a Portuguese factory in the city. However, Pedro Cabral entered into a conflict with the local Arab merchant guilds, with the result that the Portuguese factory was overrun in a riot and up to 70 Portuguese were killed. Cabral blamed the Zamorin for the incident and bombarded the city. Thus war broke out between Portugal and Kozhikode.

Vasco da Gama invoked his royal letter to take command of the Fourth India Armada, scheduled to set out in 1502, with the explicit aim of taking revenge upon the Zamorin and force him to submit to Portuguese terms. The heavily armed fleet of fifteen ships and eight hundred men left Lisbon on 12 February 1502. It was followed in April by another squadron of five ships led by his cousin, Estêvão da Gama (the son of Aires da Gama), which caught up to them in the Indian Ocean. The Fourth Armada was a veritable da Gama family affair. Two of his maternal uncles, Vicente Sodré and Brás Sodré, were pre-designated to command an Indian Ocean naval patrol, while brothers-in-law Álvaro de Ataíde (brother of Vasco's wife Catarina) and Lopo Mendes de Vasconcelos (betrothed to Teresa da Gama, Vasco's sister) captained ships in the main fleet.

On the outgoing voyage, da Gama's fleet opened contact with the East African gold trading port of Sofala and reduced the sultanate of Kilwa to tribute, extracting a substantial sum of gold.

=== Massacre of pilgrim ship ===
On reaching India in October 1502, da Gama's fleet intercepted Mirim, a ship of Muslim pilgrims at Madayi travelling from Kozhikode to Mecca. Described in detail by eyewitness Thomé Lopes and chronicler Gaspar Correia, da Gama looted the ship with over 400 pilgrims on board including 50 women, locked in the passengers, the owner and an ambassador from Egypt and burned them to death. They offered their wealth, which "could ransom all the Christian slaves in the Kingdom of Fez and much more" but were not spared. Da Gama looked on through the porthole and saw the women bringing up their gold and jewels and holding up their babies to beg for mercy. The lives of twenty children were spared against a forced conversion to Christianity.

=== Kozhikode ===
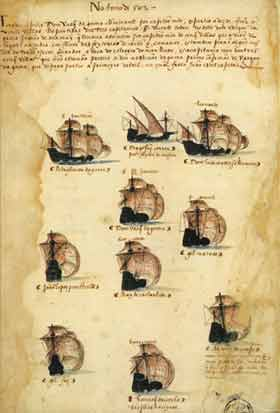
A depiction of da Gama's fleet (from the Livro das Armadas)

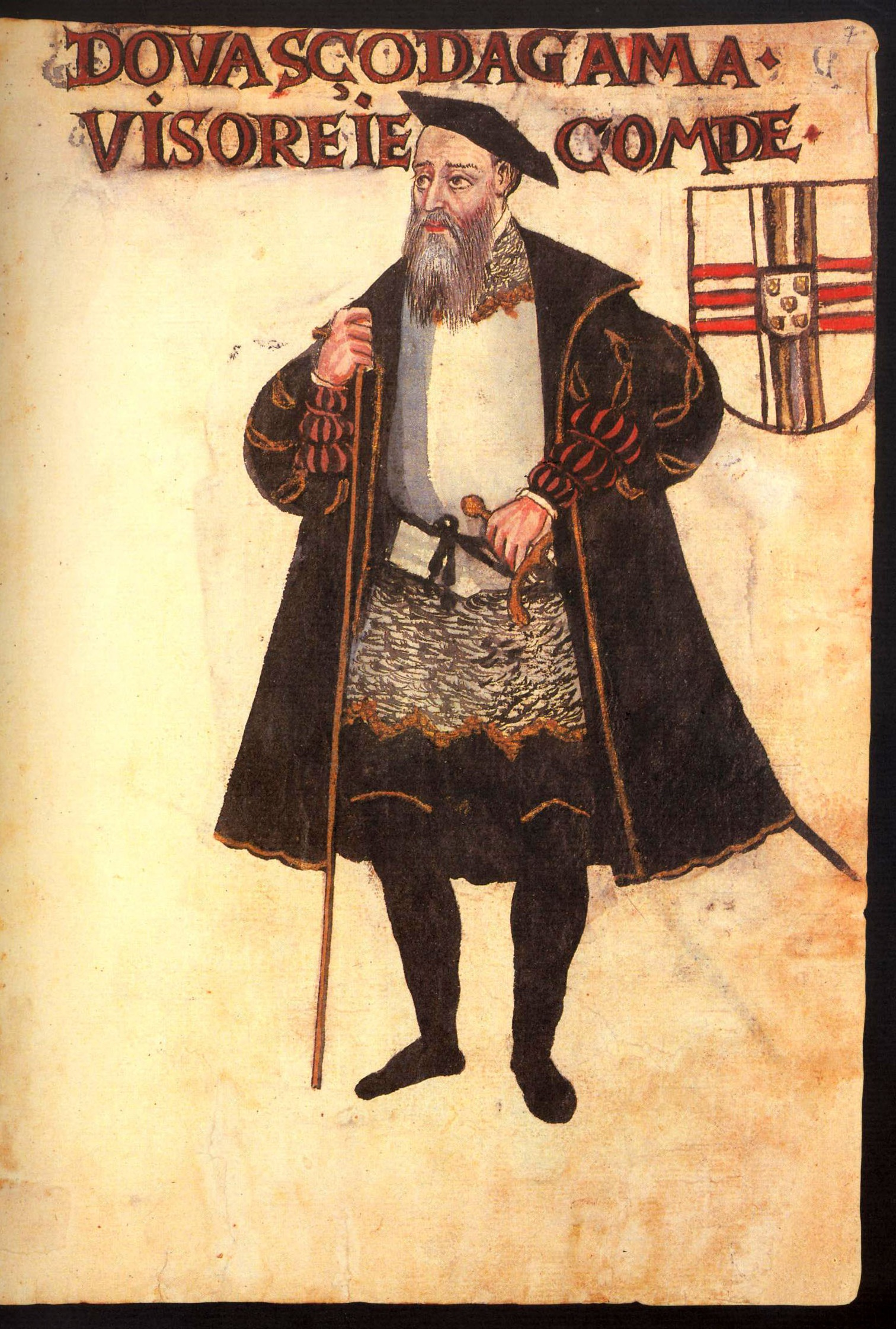
Portrait of an aged D. Vasco da Gama, as Viceroy of India and Count of Vidigueira, in Livro de Lisuarte de Abreu, c. 1560

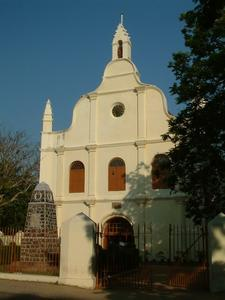
St. Francis CSI Church, in Kochi. Vasco da Gama died in Kochi in 1524 when he was on his third visit to India. His body was originally buried in this church.

After stopping at Cannanore, Gama drove his fleet before Kozhikode, demanding redress for the treatment of Cabral. Having known of the fate of the pilgrims' ship, the Zamorin adopted a conciliatory attitude towards the Portuguese and expressed willingness to sign a new treaty, but da Gama made a call to the Hindu king to expel all Muslims from Kozhikode before beginning negotiations, which was turned down. At the same time however, the Zamorin sent a message to his rebellious vassal, the Raja of Cochin, urging cooperation and obedience to counter the Portuguese threat; the ruler of Cochin forwarded this message to Gama, which reinforced his opinion of the Indians as duplicitous. After da Gama's demand for the expulsion of Muslims from Kozhikode, the Zamorin sent the high priest Talappana Namboothiri (the very same person who conducted da Gama to the Zamorin's chamber during his much celebrated first visit to Kozhikodein May 1498) for talks. Da Gama called him a spy, ordered the priest's lips and ears to be cut off and after sewing a pair of dog's ears to his head, sent him away. The Portuguese fleet then bombarded the unfortified city for nearly two days from the sea, severely damaging it. He also captured several rice vessels and cut off the crew's hands, ears and noses, dispatching them with a note to the Zamorin, in which Gama declared that he would be open to friendly relations once the Zamorin had paid for the items plundered from the feitoria as well as the gunpowder and cannonballs.

=== Sea battle ===
The violent treatment meted out by da Gama quickly brought trade along the Malabar Coast of India, upon which Calicut (Kozhikode) depended, to a standstill. The Zamorin ventured to dispatch a fleet of strong warships to challenge da Gama's armada, but which Gama managed to defeat in a naval battle before Kozhikode harbor.

=== Cochin ===
Da Gama loaded up with spices at Cochin and Cannanore, small nearby kingdoms at war with the Zamorin, whose alliances had been secured by prior Portuguese fleets. The 4th armada left India in early 1503. Da Gama left behind a small squadron of caravels under the command of his uncle, Vicente Sodré, to patrol the Indian coast, to continue harassing Kozhikode shipping, and to protect the Portuguese factories at Cochin and Cannanore from the Zamorin's inevitable reprisals.

Vasco da Gama arrived back in Portugal in September 1503, effectively having failed in his mission to bring the Zamorin to submission. This failure, and the subsequent more galling failure of his uncle Vicente Sodré to protect the Portuguese factory in Cochin, probably counted against any further rewards. When the Portuguese king Manuel I decided to appoint the first governor and viceroy of Portuguese India in 1505, da Gama was conspicuously overlooked, and the post given to Francisco de Almeida.

== Interlude ==
For the next two decades, Vasco da Gama lived out a quiet life, unwelcome in the royal court and sidelined from Indian affairs. His attempts to return to the favor of Manuel I, including switching over to the Order of Christ in 1507, yielded little. Almeida, the larger-than-life Afonso de Albuquerque and, later on, Albergaria and Sequeira, were the king's preferred point men for India.

After Ferdinand Magellan defected to the Crown of Castile in 1518, Vasco da Gama threatened to do the same, prompting the king to undertake steps to retain him in Portugal and avoid the embarrassment of losing his own "Admiral of the Indies" to Spain. In 1519, after years of ignoring his petitions, King Manuel I finally hurried to give Vasco da Gama a feudal title, appointing him the first Count of Vidigueira, a title created by a royal decree issued in Évora on 29 December, after a complicated agreement with Dom Jaime, Duke of Braganza, who ceded him on payment the towns of Vidigueira and Vila dos Frades. The decree granted Vasco da Gama and his heirs all the revenues and privileges related, thus promoting da Gama from a petty noble to one of the relatively few titled nobles in Portugal.

== Third voyage and death ==
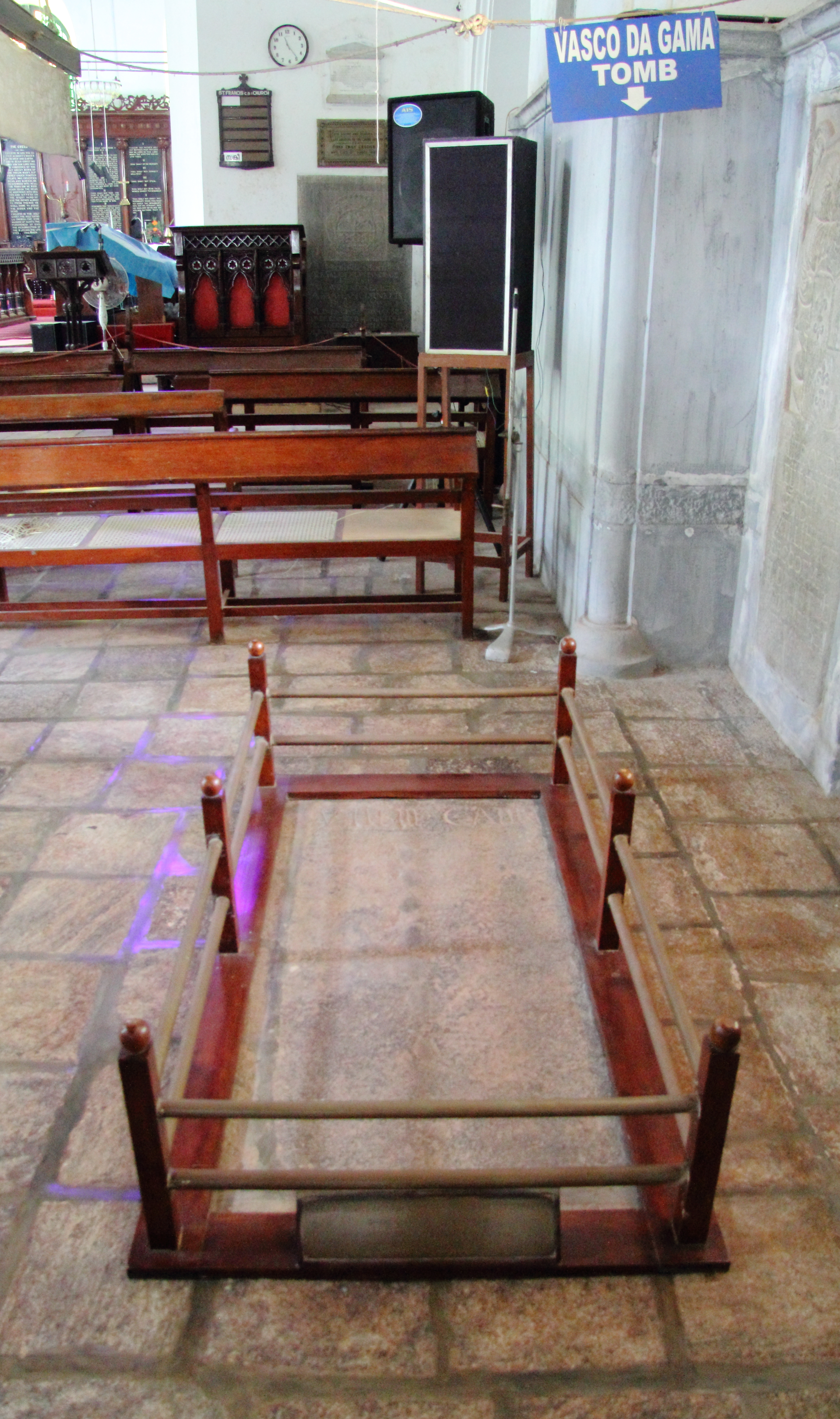
Gama's former tomb in St. Francis Church, Kochi

After the death of King Manuel I in late 1521, his son and successor, King John III of Portugal set about reviewing the Portuguese government overseas. Turning away from the old Albuquerque clique (now represented by Diogo Lopes de Sequeira), John III looked for a fresh start. Vasco da Gama re-emerged from his political wilderness as an important adviser to the new king's appointments and strategy. Seeing the new Spanish threat to the Maluku Islands as the priority, Vasco da Gama advised against the obsession with Arabia that had pervaded much of the Manueline period, and continued to be the dominant concern of Duarte de Menezes, then-governor of Portuguese India. Menezes also turned out to be incompetent and corrupt, subject to numerous complaints. As a result, John III decided to appoint Vasco da Gama himself to replace Menezes, confident that the magic of his name and memory of his deeds might better impress his authority on Portuguese India, and manage the transition to a new government and new strategy.

By his appointment letter of February 1524, John III granted Vasco da Gama the privileged title of "Viceroy", being only the second Portuguese governor to enjoy that title (the first was Francisco de Almeida in 1505). His second son, Estêvão da Gama was simultaneously appointed Capitão-mor do Mar da Índia ('Captain-major of the Indian Sea', commander of the Indian Ocean naval patrol fleet), to replace Duarte's brother, Luís de Menezes. As a final condition, Gama secured from John III of Portugal the commitment to appoint all his sons successively as Portuguese captains of Malacca.

Setting out in April 1524, with a fleet of fourteen ships, Vasco da Gama took as his flagship the famous large carrack Santa Catarina do Monte Sinai on her last journey to India, along with two of his sons, Estêvão and Paulo.

=== The underwater quake ===
After a troubled journey in which four or five of the ships were lost en route, he arrived in India in September.

Early on the morning of September 8, as the ships laid becalmed near Dabul the sea began to boil and the vessels pitched and rocked violently for about an hour as the result of a submarine earthquake. The Portuguese crews were frightened, and one death occurred as a sailor jumped overboard in panic and drowned. Gama capitalized on the situation and so as to reassure his men cried out:

Friends, rejoice and be happy, for even the sea trembles before us!

=== Death ===
Vasco da Gama immediately invoked his high viceregal powers to impose a new order in Portuguese India, replacing all the old officials with his own appointments. But da Gama contracted malaria not long after arriving and died in the city of Cochin in India on Christmas Eve in 1524, three months after his arrival. As per royal instructions, da Gama was succeeded as governor of India by one of the captains who had come with him, Henrique de Menezes (no relation to Duarte). Da Gama's sons Estêvão and Paulo immediately lost their posts and joined the returning fleet of early 1525 (along with the dismissed Duarte de Menezes and Luís de Menezes).

Vasco da Gama's body was first buried at St. Francis Church, at Fort Kochi in the city of Kochi, but his remains were returned to Portugal in 1539. The body of Vasco da Gama was re-interred in Vidigueira in a casket decorated with gold and jewels.

Tomb of Vasco da Gama in the Jerónimos Monastery in Belém, Lisbon

The Monastery of the Hieronymites, in Belém, which later became the necropolis of the Portuguese royal dynasty of Aviz, was erected in the early 1500s near the launch point of Vasco da Gama's first journey; its construction funded by a tax on the profits of the yearly Portuguese India Armadas. In 1880, what were believed to be da Gama's remains and those of the poet Luís de Camões (who celebrated da Gama's first voyage in his 1572 epic poem, Os Lusíadas), were moved to new carved tombs in the nave of the monastery's church, only a few meters away from the tombs of the kings Manuel I and John III, whom da Gama had served.

However, by 1884, Teixeira de Aragão, one of the advocates for the transfer of da Gama's remains to the monastery, discovered documents suggesting that the wrong remains had been exhumed from Vidigueira. Apparently, da Gama's gravestone had been exchanged with that of his great-grandson Francisco da Gama, whose tomb lay opposite his, likely during restoration works in 1841. Additionally, it was found that the casket moved in 1880 contained the bones of more than one person, whereas the other tomb contained only one skeleton. It was not until May 1898, during the celebrations of the fourth centenary of da Gama's arrival in Kozhikode, that the remains from the other tomb in the chapel of Vidigueira were moved to the Hieronymite monastery. In 1994, a member of the family that now owns the estate where da Gama's remains were until the 1880s claimed that the real bones of Vasco da Gama were located in an unmarked spot on the estate, purportedly having been hidden there by the estate's owner in the 19th century, the Visconde de Ribeira Brava.

== Marriage and descendants ==
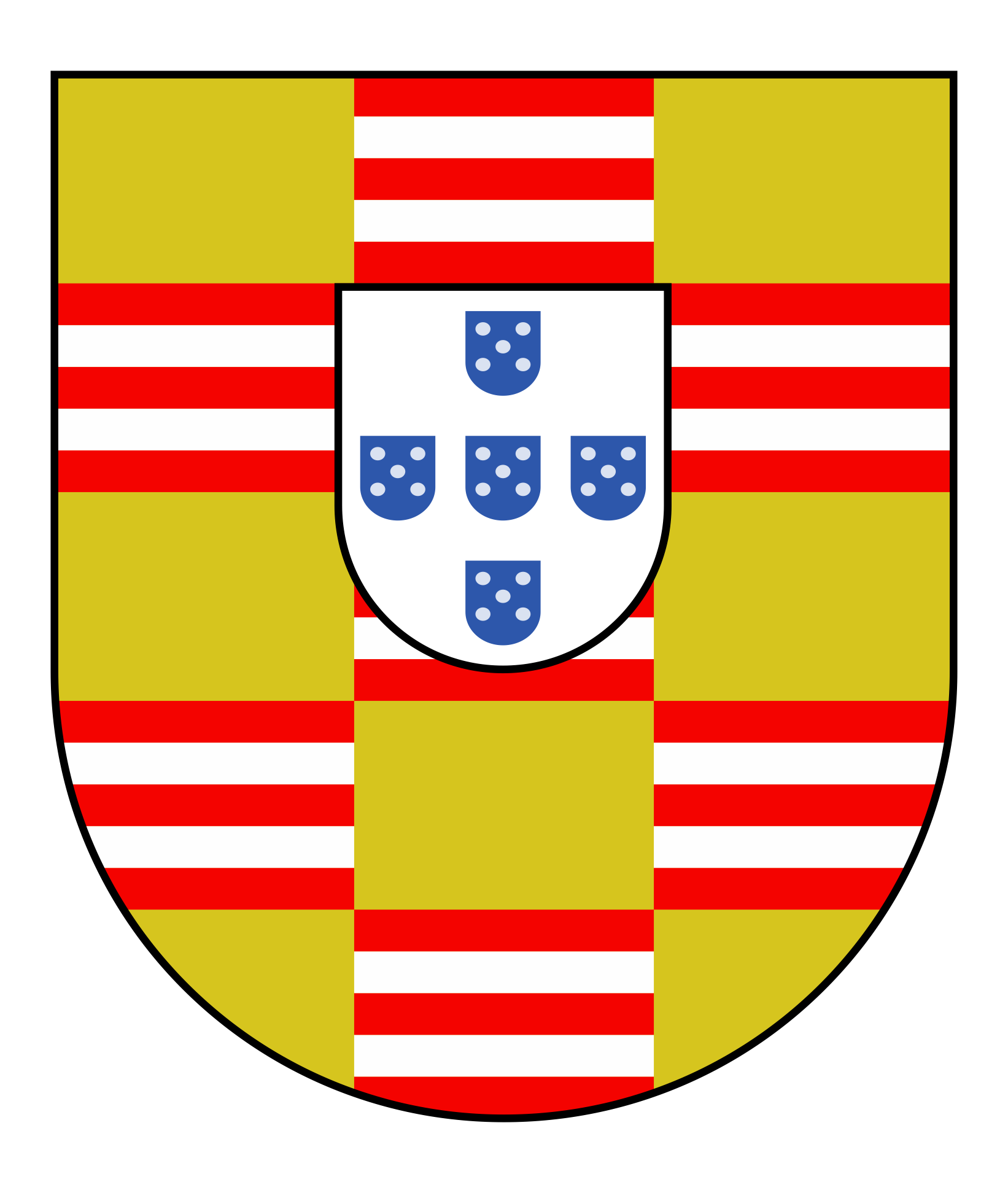
Coat of arms of Vasco da Gama

Vasco da Gama and his wife, Catarina de Ataíde, had six sons and one daughter:

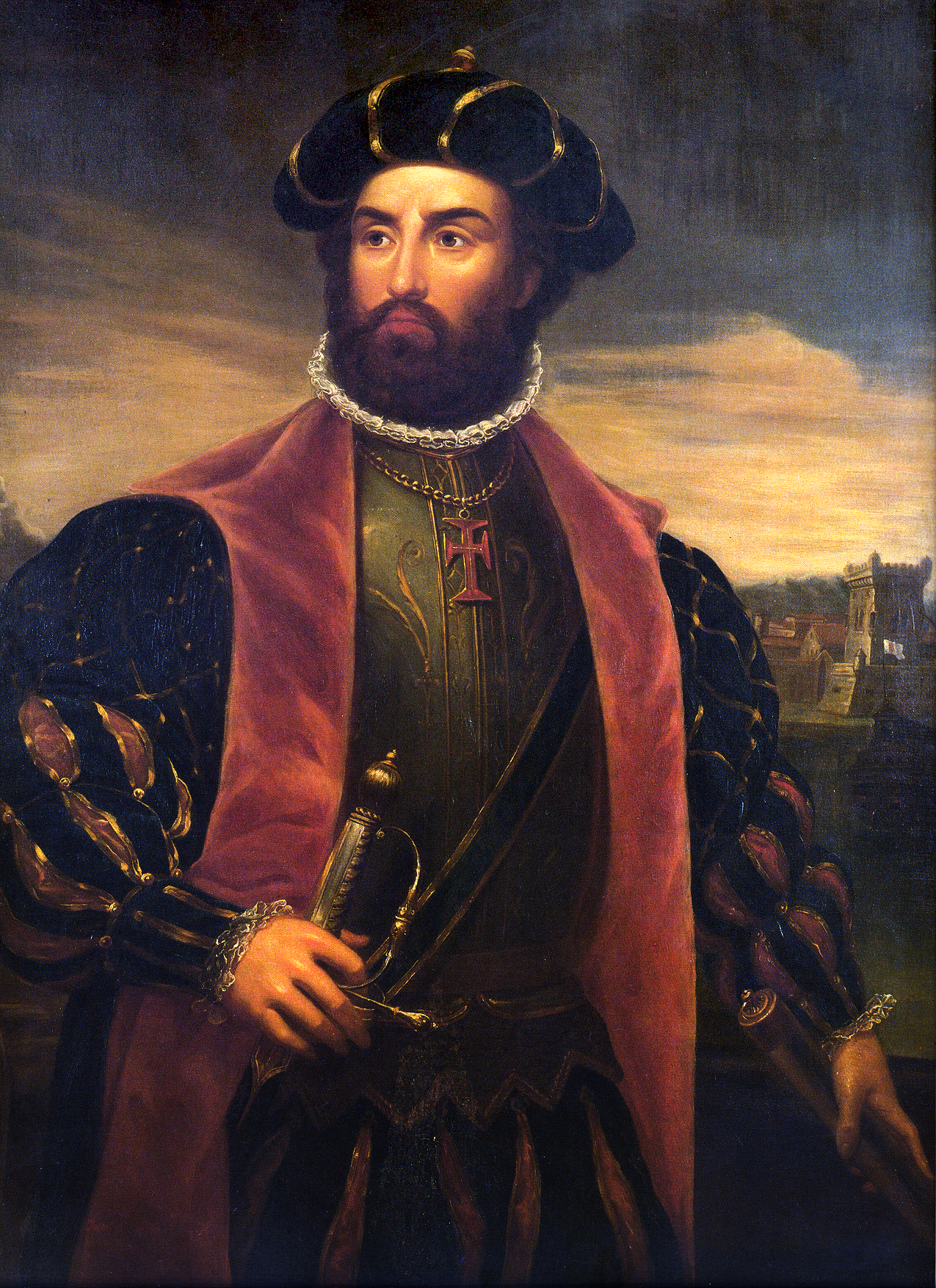
Portrait of Vasco da Gama by António Manuel da Fonseca (1838)

1. Dom Francisco da Gama, who inherited his father's titles as 2nd Count of Vidigueira and the 2nd "Admiral of the Seas of India, Arabia and Persia". He remained in Portugal.
2. Dom Estêvão da Gama, after his abortive 1524 term as Indian patrol captain, he was appointed for a three-year term as captain of Malacca, serving from 1534 to 1539 (includes the last two years of his younger brother Paulo's term). He was subsequently appointed as the 11th governor of India from 1540 to 1542.
3. Dom Paulo da Gama (having the same name as his uncle Paulo), captain of Malacca from 1533 to 1534, killed in a naval action off Malacca.
4. Dom Cristóvão da Gama, captain of Malacca from 1538 to 1540; nominated to succeed in Malacca, but executed by Ahmad ibn Ibrahim during the Ethiopian-Adal war in 1542.
5. Dom Pedro da Silva da Gama, appointed captain of Malacca from 1548 to 1552.
6. Dom Álvaro de Ataíde da Gama, appointed captain of Malacca fleet in the 1540s, captain of Malacca itself from 1552 to 1554.
7. Dona Isabel de Ataíde da Gama, only daughter, married Dom Ignacio de Noronha, son of the first Count of Linhares.

His male-line issue became extinct in 1735, when the 7th Count of Vidigueira, Dom Vasco Baltasar José Luís Gama died, leaving only one daughter from his marriage, Dona Maria José da Gama, who inherited the Vidigueira estate. The title thus continued through this female-line.

=== Later generations ===
- Dom Vasco da Gama, 3rd Count of Vidigueira, the nobility and military personnel, son of Francisco (2nd Count) and grandson of Vasco da Gama.
- Dom Francisco da Gama, 4th Count of Vidigueira, the viceroy (1597–1600) and governor (1622–1628) of India, son of Vasco (3rd Count) and great-grandson of Vasco da Gama.

== Legacy ==
Vasco da Gama is one of the most celebrated explorers from the Age of Discovery. Along with Prince Henry the Navigator, he was one of the main people responsible for Portugal's success as an early colonizing power. Beside the first voyage to India, his astute mix of politics and war placed Portugal in a prominent position in Indian Ocean trade. Following da Gama's initial voyage, the Portuguese crown realized that securing outposts on the east coast of Africa would prove vital to maintaining national trade routes to the Far East. However, his fame is tempered by attitudes as displayed in the notorious Pilgrim Ship Incident.

Vasco da Gama reached the final pool of Os Grandes Portugueses (the Greatest Portuguese). The Portuguese national epic, the Lusíadas of Luís Vaz de Camões, largely concerns Vasco da Gama's voyages. The 1865 grand opera L'Africaine, composed by Giacomo Meyerbeer from a libretto by Eugène Scribe, prominently includes the character of Vasco da Gama. The events depicted, however, are fictitious. Meyerbeer's working title for the opera was Vasco da Gama. A 1989 production by the San Francisco Opera featured tenor Plácido Domingo in the role of da Gama. The 19th-century composer Louis-Albert Bourgault-Ducoudray composed an eponymous 1872 opera based on da Gama's life and exploits at sea. South African musician Hugh Masekela recorded an anti-colonialist song entitled "Colonial Man", which contains the lyrics "Vasco da Gama was no friend of mine", and another song entitled "Vasco da Gama (The Sailor Man)". Both were included in his 1976 album Colonial Man.

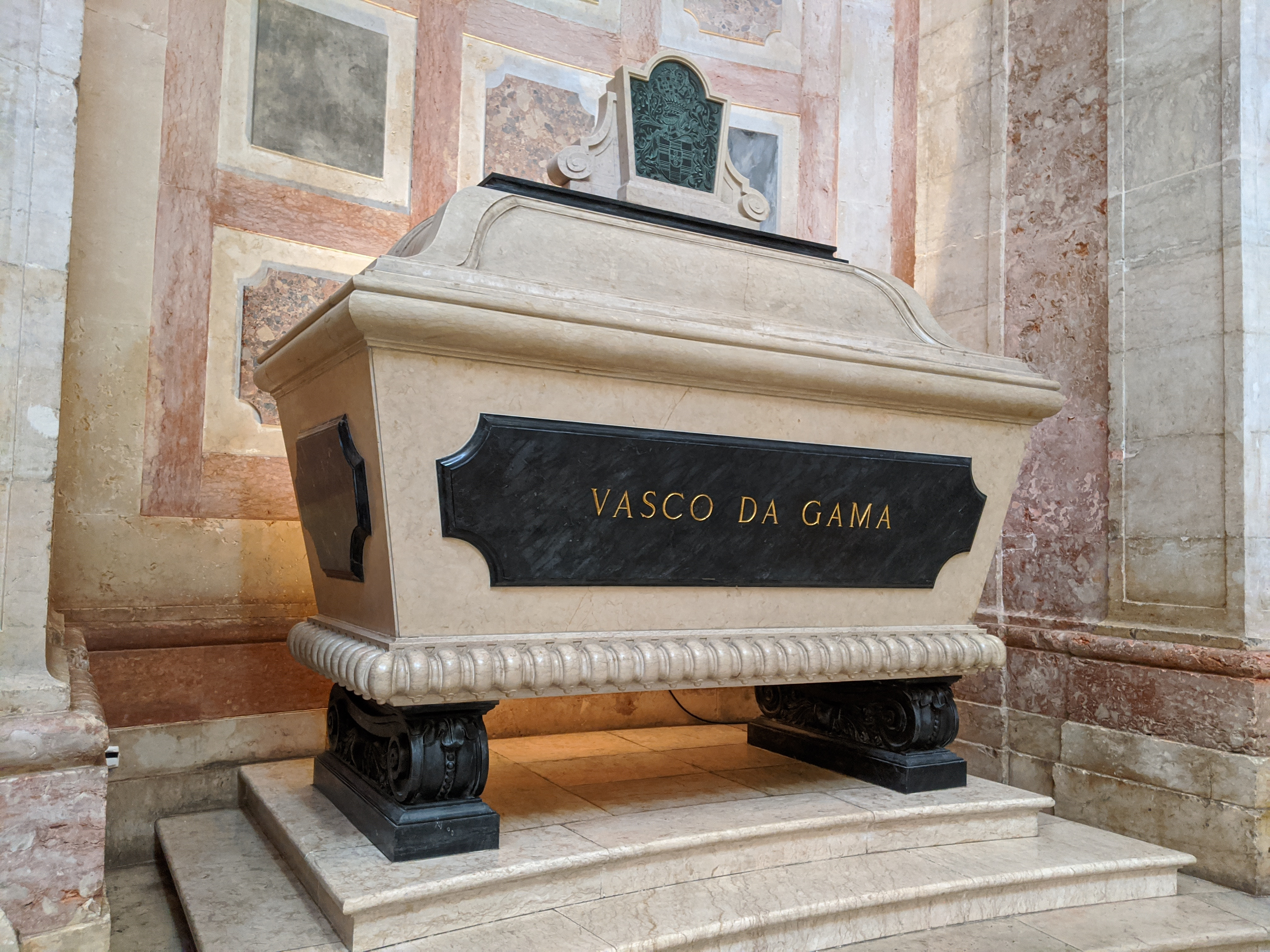
Cenotaph to Vasco da Gama in the Church of Santa Engrácia, now the National Pantheon in Lisbon

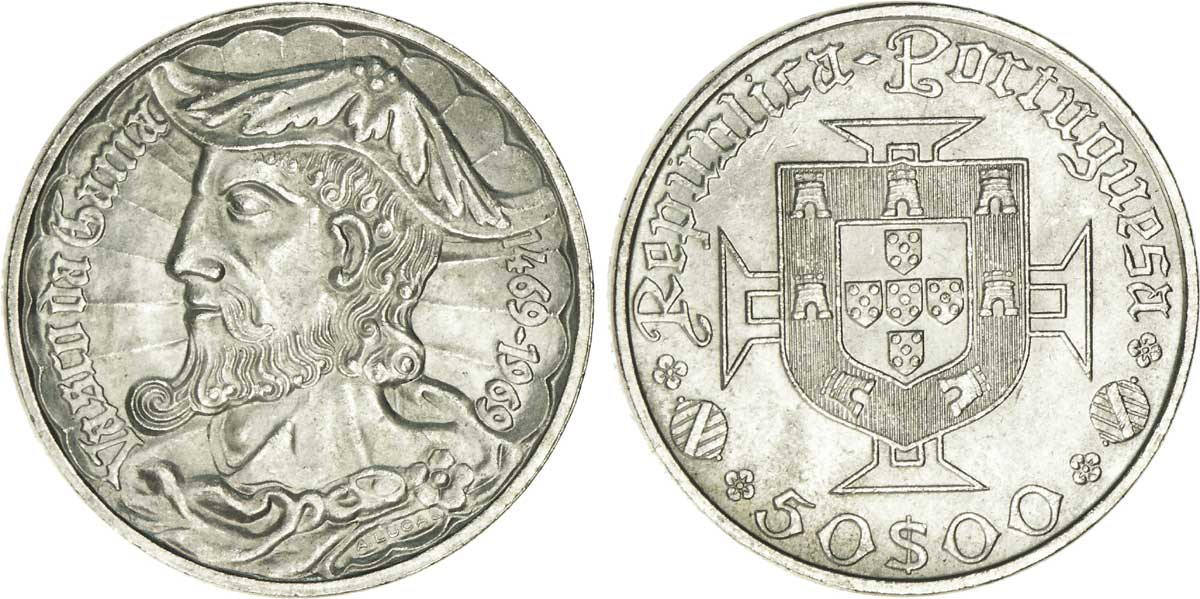
Portuguese coin from 1969 commemorating the 500th anniversary of da Gama's birth

Several places in Lisbon's Parque das Nações are named after the explorer, such as the Vasco da Gama Bridge, Vasco da Gama Tower and the Centro Comercial Vasco da Gama shopping centre. The Oceanário in the Parque das Nações has a mascot of a cartoon diver with the name of "Vasco". The Portuguese Navy has a class of frigates named after him. There are three Vasco da Gama class frigates in total, of which the first one also bears his name. The Portuguese government erected two navigational beacons, Dias Cross and da Gama Cross, to commemorate da Gama and Bartolomeu Dias, who were the first modern European explorers to reach the Cape of Good Hope. When lined up, these crosses point to Whittle Rock, a large, permanently submerged shipping hazard in False Bay.

The port city of Vasco da Gama, Goa is named after him, as is the crater Vasco da Gama on the Moon. There are three football clubs in Brazil (including CR Vasco da Gama) and Vasco SC in Goa that were named after him. There is a church in Kochi, Kerala called Vasco da Gama Church, and a private residence on the island of Saint Helena. The suburb of Vasco in Cape Town honours him. The Vasco da Gama Garden in Macau is named after him. Vasco da Gama appears as an antagonist in the Indian film Urumi. The film, directed by Santosh Sivan, depicts atrocities and progression to establish the Portuguese empire by da Gama in India.

In 2016, archaeologists working off the coast of Oman identified a shipwreck believed to be that of the Esmeralda from da Gama's 1502–03 fleet. The wreck was initially discovered in 1998. Underwater excavations took place between 2013 and 2015 through a partnership between the Oman Ministry of Heritage and Culture and Blue Water Recoveries Ltd., a shipwreck recovery company. The vessel was identified through such artifacts as a "Portuguese coin minted for trade with India (one of only two coins of this type known to exist) and stone cannonballs engraved with what appear to be the initials of Vincente Sodré, da Gama's maternal uncle and the commander of the Esmeralda."

== See also ==
- Chronology of European exploration of Asia

Preceded by Duarte de Menezes	Governor of Portuguese India; September−December 1524	Succeeded by Henrique de Menezes; Lopo Vaz de Sampaio
