= 1583 in India =

- Centuries: 15th; 16th; 17th; 18th
- Decades: 1560s; 1570s; 1580s; 1590s; 1600s
- See also: List of years in India; Timeline of Indian history

Events from the year 1583 in India.

== Events ==
- 25 July – Cuncolim Revolt
- Muzaffar Shah III escapes from prison and briefly re-establishes the Muzaffarid dynasty of Gujarat before Akbar established the Mughal dynasty
- Building of the fort of Allahabad by Emperor Akbar.

== Deaths ==
- Rodolfo Acquaviva, Jesuit missionary at the court of Akbar dies (born 1550)

== See also ==
- Timeline of Indian history
