= 1593 in India =

- Centuries: 15th; 16th; 17th; 18th
- Decades: 1570s; 1580s; 1590s; 1600s; 1610s
- See also: List of years in India; Timeline of Indian history

Events from the year 1593 in India.

== Births ==
- 6 April – Mumtaz Mahal, chief consort of Shah Jahan, (died 1631).

== Deaths ==
- Appayya Dikshitar, performer of yajñas dies (born 1520)

== See also ==
- Timeline of Indian history.
