= Paulo da Gama =

Portuguese explorer (c. 1465–1499)

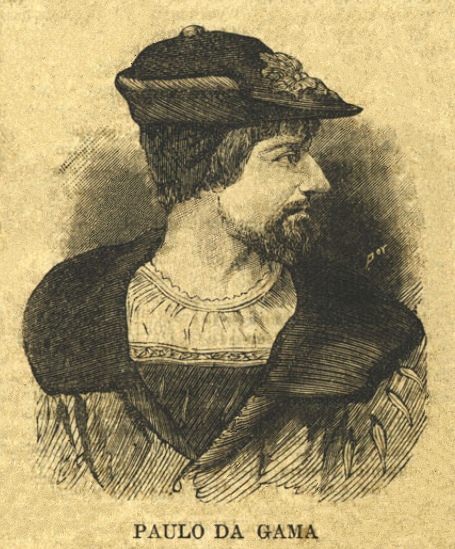
- 19th-century imagined portrait of Paulo da Gama
- Born: c. 1465; Olivença, Kingdom of Portugal
- Died: June or July 1499 (aged 33–34); Angra do Heroísmo, Azores, Kingdom of Portugal
- Occupation: Explorer

Paulo da Gama (European Portuguese pronunciation: [ˈpawlu ðɐ ˈɣɐmɐ]; c. 1465 – June or July 1499) was a Portuguese explorer, son of Estêvão da Gama and Isabel Sodré, and the older brother of Vasco da Gama.

He was a member of the first voyage from Europe to India, led by his brother, commanding the ship São Rafael, which would be later scuttled in the return trip. Paulo da Gama joined the São Gabriel. His brother brought him to the Terceira Island of the Azores and stayed with him until his death, before he returned to Portugal in September 1499. Paulo da Gama is buried in the monastery of São Francisco in the city of Angra do Heroísmo.
