= 1545 in India =

- Centuries: 15th; 16th; 17th; 18th
- Decades: 1520s; 1530s; 1540s; 1550s; 1560s
- See also: List of years in India; Timeline of Indian history

Events from the year 1545 in India.

== Events ==
- 26 May – Islam Shah Suri succeeds Sher Shah Suri to become ruler of the Sur Empire

== Deaths ==
- 22 May – Sher Shah Suri (born 1486)

== See also ==
- Timeline of Indian history
