= 1592 in India =

- Centuries: 15th; 16th; 17th; 18th
- Decades: 1570s; 1580s; 1590s; 1600s; 1610s
- See also: List of years in India; Timeline of Indian history

Events from the year 1592 in India.

== Events ==
- The Qutb Shahi monument Char Kaman is built in Hyderabad and Dutch came to India

== Births ==
- 5 January – Shah Jahan, Emperor and poet (died 1666).

== See also ==
- Timeline of Indian history
