= 1580 in India =

- Centuries: 15th; 16th; 17th; 18th
- Decades: 1560s; 1570s; 1580s; 1590s; 1600s
- See also: List of years in India; Timeline of Indian history

Events from the year 1580 in India.

== Events ==
- Ibrahim Adil Shah II becomes sultan of the Bijapur Sultanate, following the death of Ali Adil Shah I
- Muhammad Quli Qutb Shah becomes fifth sultan of the Qutb Shahi dynasty (and reigns until 1611)

== Deaths ==
- Ali Adil Shah I, Bijapur Sultanate
- Ibrahim Quli Qutb Shah Wali, ruler of Golkonda died (born 1518)

== See also ==
- Timeline of Indian history
