= 1598 in India =

- Centuries: 15th; 16th; 17th; 18th
- Decades: 1570s; 1580s; 1590s; 1600s; 1610s
- See also: List of years in India; Timeline of Indian history

Events from the year 1598 in India.

== Events ==
The first known English use of zero was in 1598.

== Births ==
- 12 January – Jijabai, mother of Shivaji, (died 1674)

== Deaths ==
- Mata Bhani, also known as Bibi Bhani, daughter of third Sikh guru Guru Amar Das, wife of fourth Sikh guru Guru Ram Das, and mother of fifth Sikh guru Guru Arjan Dev dies (born 1535)

== See also ==
- Timeline of Indian history
