= 1547 in India =

- Centuries: 15th; 16th; 17th; 18th
- Decades: 1520s; 1530s; 1540s; 1550s; 1560s
- See also: List of years in India; Timeline of Indian history

Events from the year 1547 in India.

== Events ==
- Piploda princely state is established

== Births ==
- 24 September – Faizi, Malik-ush-Shu'ara (poet laureate) of Akbar's Court. (died 1595)

== Deaths ==
- Raghunatha Siromani, philosopher and logician (born 1477) (died 1547)
- Meerabai, Hindu mystic poet and devotee of Krishna (born year unknown in Kurki) (died 1547 in Dwarka)

== See also ==
- Timeline of Indian history
