= 1600 in India =

- Centuries: 15th; 16th; 17th; 18th
- Decades: 1580s; 1590s; 1600s; 1610s; 1620s
- See also: List of years in India; Timeline of Indian history

Events from the year 1600 in India.

== Events ==
- East India Company granted Royal Charter by Elizabeth I of England (ran until disestablishment in 1874)
- Dhamapur Dam opened

== See also ==
Timeline of Indian history
