= 1590 in India =

- Centuries: 15th; 16th; 17th; 18th
- Decades: 1570s; 1580s; 1590s; 1600s; 1610s
- See also: List of years in India; Timeline of Indian history

Events from the year 1590 in India.

== Events ==
- Second battle of Rohinkhed
- Writing of the Akbarnama
- Paintings by Farrukh Beg
- Paintings by Basawan

== Births ==
- Virji Vora, merchant (died around 1670)

== See also ==
- Timeline of Indian history
