= 1586 in India =

- Centuries: 15th; 16th; 17th; 18th
- Decades: 1560s; 1570s; 1580s; 1590s; 1600s
- See also: List of years in India; Timeline of Indian history

Events from the year 1586 in India.

== Events ==
- Hazira Maqbara, a mausoleum of Qutb-ud-din Muhammad Khan, is built

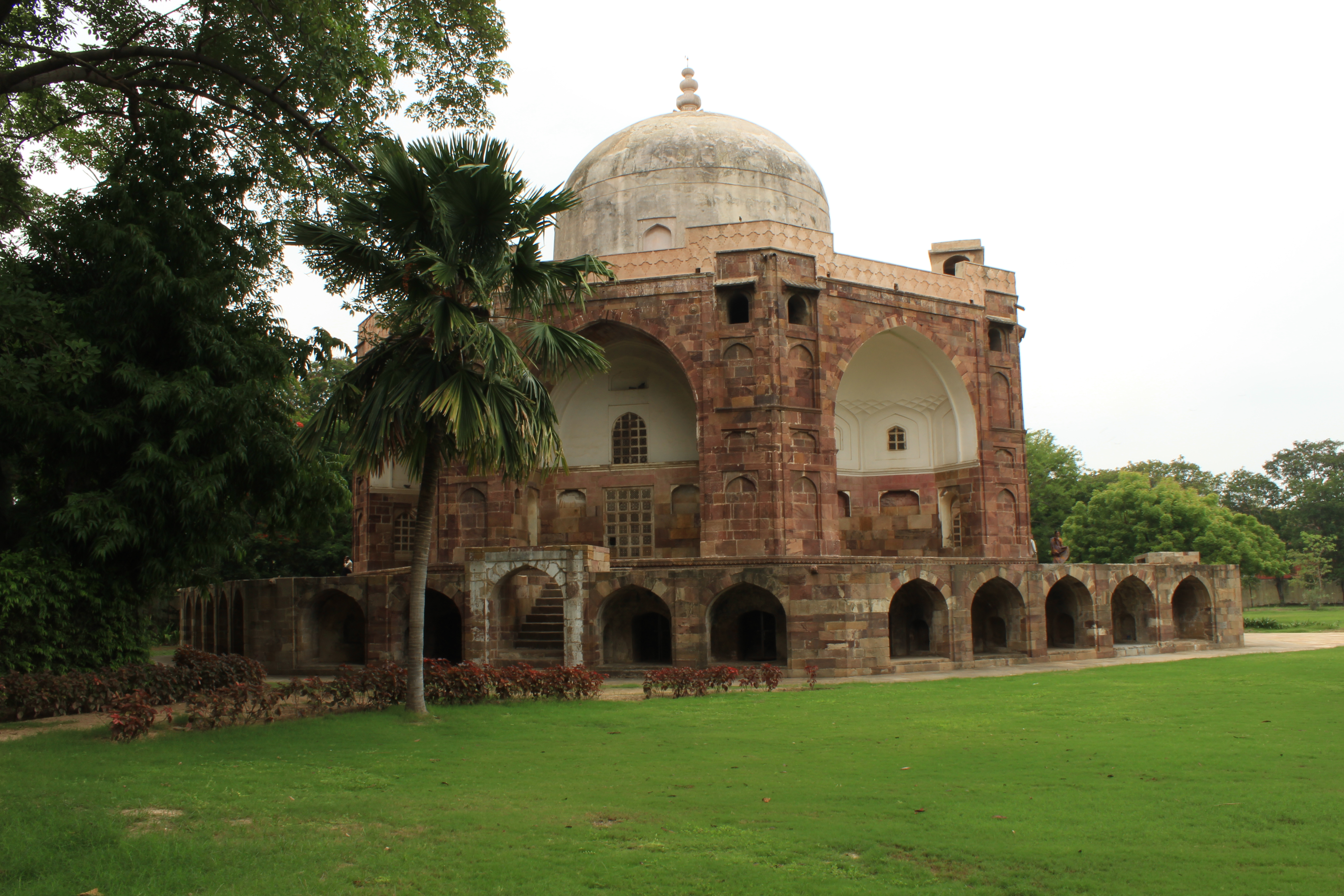
Hazira from side

== Births ==
- Banarasidas, Shrimal Jain businessman and poet (died 1643)

== Deaths ==
- Birbal, Wazīr-e Azam of the Mughal court (born 1528)

== See also ==
- Timeline of Indian history
