= 1544 in India =

- Centuries: 15th; 16th; 17th; 18th
- Decades: 1520s; 1530s; 1540s; 1550s; 1560s
- See also: List of years in India; Timeline of Indian history

Events from the year 1544 in India.

== Events ==
- The Battle of Sammel was fought near what are now Giri and Sumel villages in the Jaitaran sub-division of Rajasthan's Pali district. The belligerents were Sher Shah Suri, founder of the Muslim Sur Empire, and Rao Maldeo Rathore, the Hindu Rajput king of Marwar.

== Births ==
- Dadu Dayal

== See also ==
- Timeline of Indian history
