= 1527 in India =

- Centuries: 15th; 16th; 17th; 18th
- Decades: 1500s; 1510s; 1520s; 1530s; 1540s
- See also: List of years in India; Timeline of Indian history

Events from the year 1527 in India.

== Events ==
- 17 March – The Battle of Khanwa is fought.

== Deaths ==
- Hasan Khan Mewati, commander in the Battle of Khanwa is killed at that battle (year of birth unknown)

== See also ==
- Timeline of Indian history
