= 1579 in India =

- Centuries: 16th; 17th; 18th
- Decades: 1550s; 1560s; 1570s; 1580s; 1590s
- See also: List of years in India; Timeline of Indian history

Events from the year 1579 in India.

== Events ==
- Mughal Emperor, Akbar grants an Imperial farman to the Portuguese to settle near Satgaon in Bengal.
- Kottayam Cheriapally was built in Kerala

== See also ==
- Timeline of Indian history
