= 1531 in India =

- Centuries: 15th; 16th; 17th; 18th
- Decades: 1510s; 1520s; 1530s; 1540s; 1550s
- See also: List of years in India; Timeline of Indian history

Events from the year 1531 in India.

== Events ==
- Siege of Diu (1531)

== Deaths ==
- Vallabha Acharya – founder of the Pushti sect in India,

== See also ==
- Timeline of Indian history
