= 1591 in India =

- Centuries: 15th; 16th; 17th; 18th
- Decades: 1570s; 1580s; 1590s; 1600s; 1610s
- See also: List of years in India; Timeline of Indian history

Events from the year 1591 in India.

== Events ==
- Hyderabad, India established by Muhammad Quli Qutb Shah and Charminar built

== Births ==
- Mir Jumla II, subahdar of Bengal (died 1663)

== Deaths ==
- Meherji Rana Parsi spiritual leader dies (born 1514)
- Koti & channayya (death) are twin legends of dakshina Kannada district Karnataka

== See also ==
- Timeline of Indian history
