= 1584 in India =

- Centuries: 16th; 17th; 18th
- Decades: 1560s; 1570s; 1580s; 1590s; 1600s
- See also: List of years in India; Timeline of Indian history

Events from the year 1584 in India.

== Events ==
- Francisco de Mascarenhas ends his governorship as 13th Vice Regent of Portuguese India (since 1581)
- Duarte de Menezes, 14th Viceroy of India becomes 14th Vice Regent of Portuguese India (until 1584). He is the grandson of earlier India governor Duarte de Menezes, who died in Goa, May 1588.

== See also ==
- Timeline of Indian history
