= 1529 in India =

- Centuries: 15th; 16th; 17th; 18th
- Decades: 1500s; 1510s; 1520s; 1530s; 1540s
- See also: List of years in India; Timeline of Indian history

Events from the year 1529 in India.

== Events ==
- 6 May – The Battle of Ghaghra is fought.
- Krishnadevaraya ends his reign as emperor of Vijayanagara Empire.
- Achyuta Deva Raya, brother of Krishnadevaraya, begins his reign as emperor of Vijayanagara Empire.
- Lopo Vaz de Sampaio ends his governance of Portuguese India (which started in 1526).
- Nuno da Cunha became governor of Portuguese possessions in India (until 1538).

== Deaths ==
- Krishnadevaraya, emperor of Vijayanagara Empire (born 1471).

== See also ==
- Timeline of Indian history
