= 1528 in India =

- Centuries: 15th; 16th; 17th; 18th
- Decades: 1500s; 1510s; 1520s; 1530s; 1540s
- See also: List of years in India; Timeline of Indian history

Events from the year 1528 in India.

== Events ==
- 20 January – The Battle of Chanderi is fought between Babur and Medini Rai.

== Births ==
- Birbal, Wazīr-e Azam of the Mughal court (died 1586)

== Deaths ==
- Ravidas, mystic-poet of the Bhakti movement dies (year of birth uncertain)
- Rana Sanga, ruler of Mewar, is assassinated shortly after fighting in the Battle of Khanwa (born 1484)

== See also ==
- Timeline of Indian history
