= 1555 in India =

- Centuries: 15th; 16th; 17th; 18th
- Decades: 1530s; 1540s; 1550s; 1560s; 1570s
- See also: List of years in India; Timeline of Indian history

Events from the year 1555 in India.

== Events ==
- June Francisco Barreto takes up the position of viceroy in Goa, Portuguese India
- Muhammad Adil Shah reign as fourth ruler of the Sur dynasty ends (since 1554)

== Births ==
- Keshavdas, Sanskrit scholar and Hindi poet, author of Rasik Priya, is born in Orchha (dies 1617)

== Deaths ==
- 16 June – Pedro Mascarenhas, viceroy of Portuguese India dies (born 1470)
- 5 November – Hemu (Hemu Vikramaditya), Hindu emperor of north India.

== See also ==
- Timeline of Indian history
