= 1582 in India =

- Centuries: 16th; 17th; 18th
- Decades: 1560s; 1570s; 1580s; 1590s; 1600s
- See also: List of years in India; Timeline of Indian history

Events from the year 1582 in India.

== Events ==
- Mosque established at Rohinkhed
- Hazira Maqbara mausoleum constructed in Vadodara
- Maharana Pratap defeats Mughal Forces of Akbar in Battle of Dewair in present-day Rajasthan

== Deaths ==
- Bega Begum empress of the Mughal Empire dies (born 1511)

== See also ==
- Timeline of Indian history
