= 1585 in India =

- Centuries: 16th; 17th; 18th
- Decades: 1560s; 1570s; 1580s; 1590s; 1600s
- See also: List of years in India; Timeline of Indian history

Events from the year 1585 in India.

== Events ==
- Princely state of Chitral established
- A military campaign to annexe Kashmir was launched by Mughal emperor Akbar.
- Prince Mansingh was appointed as

== See also ==
- Timeline of Indian history
