= 1551 in India =

- Centuries: 15th; 16th; 17th; 18th
- Decades: 1530s; 1540s; 1550s; 1560s; 1570s
- See also: List of years in India; Timeline of Indian history

Events from the year 1551 in India.

== Events ==
- The first volume of "História do descobrimento e conquista da Índia pelos portugueses" (History of the discovery and conquest of India by the Portuguese) by Portuguese historia Fernão Lopes de Castanheda is published

== Births ==
- Nizamuddin Ahmad, Muslim historian of late medieval India (died 1621)

== Deaths ==
- Hindal Mirza Mughal prince and youngest son of Emperor Babur dies (born 1519)

== See also ==
- Timeline of Indian history

== Sources ==
- História do descobrimento e conquista da Índia pelos portugueses, Book I (full text in Portuguese).
