= 1530 in India =

- Centuries: 16th; 17th; 18th
- Decades: 1510s; 1520s; 1530s; 1540s; 1550s
- See also: List of years in India; Timeline of Indian history

Events from the year 1530 in India.

== Events ==
- Babur's death ends his reign as Mughal emperor, and is succeeded by Humayun.

== Deaths ==
- 26 December – Babur, Mughal Emperor (born 1483).

== See also ==
- Timeline of Indian history
