= 1540 in India =

- Centuries: 15th; 16th; 17th; 18th
- Decades: 1520s; 1530s; 1540s; 1550s; 1560s
- See also: List of years in India; Timeline of Indian history

Events from the year 1540 in India.

== Events ==
- 17 May – Sur Empire established
- Biswa Singha of Kamata rule of the Koch Kingdom comes to an end (since 1515), and Nara Narayan's begins (until 1587)

== Births ==
- 9 May – Maharana Pratap, Hindu Rajput ruler of Mewar (died 1597)

== See also ==
- Timeline of Indian history
