= 1532 in India =

- Centuries: 15th; 16th; 17th; 18th
- Decades: 1510s; 1520s; 1530s; 1540s; 1550s
- See also: List of years in India; Timeline of Indian history

Events from the year 1532 in India.

== Events ==
- Sevappa Nayak governor of Thanjavur founds the Thanjavur Nayak kingdom and reigns (until 1560)

== Births ==
- Tulsidas, poet author of Ramcharitmanas (died 1623)

== Deaths ==
- Raja Shiladitya, a Tomar Rajput chieftain of northeast Malwa dies (year of birth unknown)

== See also ==
- Timeline of Indian history
