= 1595 in India =

- Centuries: 15th; 16th; 17th; 18th
- Decades: 1570s; 1580s; 1590s; 1600s; 1610s
- See also: List of years in India; Timeline of Indian history

Events from the year 1595 in India.

- Years in India: 1592 1593 1594 1595 1596 1597 1598
- Centuries: 15th century · 16th century · 17th century
- Decades: 1560s 1570s 1580s 1590s 1600s 1610s 1620s
- Years: 1592 1593 1594 1595 1596 1597 1598

== Events ==
- The Scourge of Malice is built and launched, and will go on to be used in the first, second, third and tenth voyages of the East India Company under its later name of Red Dragon

== Births ==
- 5 July Guru Hargobind, the sixth of the ten gurus of Sikhism is born in Punjab, (dies 1644)
- Bihari Lal, poet is born in Gwalior (dies 1663).
- Shri Guru Raghavendra Tirtharu is born in Bhuvanagiri, India.

== Deaths ==
- 5 October – Faizi, Malik-ush-Shu'ara (poet laureate) of Akbar's Court. (born 1547)

== See also ==
- Timeline of Indian history
