= 1539 in India =

- Centuries: 15th; 16th; 17th; 18th
- Decades: 1510s; 1520s; 1530s; 1540s; 1550s
- See also: List of years in India; Timeline of Indian history

Events from the year 1539 in India.

== Events ==
- Guru Angad Dev becomes second guru of Sikhism.
- Suhungmung's reign as king of Ahom ends with his death (began 1497).
- Suklenmung succeeds his father as king of Ahom (reigns until 1552)

== Deaths ==
- Suhungmung, king of Ahom (born 1497)

== See also ==
- Timeline of Indian history
