= 1599 in India =

- Centuries: 16th; 17th; 18th
- Decades: 1570s; 1580s; 1590s; 1600s; 1610s
- See also: List of years in India; Timeline of Indian history

Events from the year 1599 in India.

== Events ==
- 20 June – Synod of Diamper
- Nauraspur founded by Ibrahim Adil Shah II (destroyed 1624).

== Deaths ==
- Chand Bibi, warrior and acting Regent of Bijapur (1580–90) and regent of Ahmednagar (1596–99) (born 1550)
- Sant Eknath writer (born in 1533)

== See also ==
- 1599
- Timeline of Indian history
