= 1553 in India =

- Centuries: 15th; 16th; 17th; 18th
- Decades: 1530s; 1540s; 1550s; 1560s; 1570s
- See also: List of years in India; Timeline of Indian history

Events from the year 1553 in India.

== Events ==
- Burhan Shah I's death brings to an end his rule of the Ahmednagar Sultanate (started 1508 or 1510)
- Hussein Shah I begins his rule of the Ahmednagar Sultanate

== Deaths ==
- Burhan Shah I, ruler of the Ahmednagar Sultanate (born c. 1500)

== See also ==
- Timeline of Indian history
