= 1596 in India =

- Centuries: 15th; 16th; 17th; 18th
- Decades: 1570s; 1580s; 1590s; 1600s; 1610s
- See also: List of years in India; Timeline of Indian history

Events from the year 1596 in India.

== Events ==
- The Church of Our Lady of Salvation, or the Portuguese Church is established in Dadar, Mumbai

== Births ==
- Sunderdas, poet and social reformer

== Deaths ==
- Madhavdev, author and poet dies in Bhela Sattra (born 1489)

== See also ==
- Timeline of Indian history
