= 1587 in India =

- Centuries: 15th; 16th; 17th; 18th
- Decades: 1560s; 1570s; 1580s; 1590s; 1600s
- See also: List of years in India; Timeline of Indian history

Events from the year 1587 in India.

== Events ==
- Jami Masjid constructed in Hajipur
- Nara Narayan ruler of the Koch Kingdom comes to an end with his death (reigned since 1540)

== Deaths ==
- Nara Narayan, last ruler of the Koch Kingdom dies

== See also ==
- Timeline of Indian history
