= 1552 in India =

- Centuries: 15th; 16th; 17th; 18th
- Decades: 1530s; 1540s; 1550s; 1560s; 1570s
- See also: List of years in India; Timeline of Indian history

Events from the year 1552 in India.

== Events ==
- Guru Amar Das becomes third guru of Sikhism (until 1554)
- Suklenmung's reign as king of Ahom ends with his death (began 1539)
- Sukhaamphaa succeeds his father as king of Ahom (reigns until 1603)

== Deaths ==
- 28 March, Guru Angad the second of the Sikh Gurus dies (born 1504)
- Suklenmung, king of Ahom dies (born 1539).

== See also ==
- Timeline of Indian history
