= 1597 in India =

- Centuries: 15th; 16th; 17th; 18th
- Decades: 1570s; 1580s; 1590s; 1600s; 1610s
- See also: List of years in India; Timeline of Indian history

Events from the year 1597 in India.

== Events ==
- Amar Singh I becomes Maharana of Mewar, Udaipur and rules until his death in 1620.
- Dom Francisco de Gama becomes viceroy of India (until 1600)

== Deaths ==
- 19 January – Maharana Pratap, Hindu Rajput ruler of Mewar (born 1540)
- 5 February – Gonsalo Garcia, Roman Catholic Franciscan friar from India (born 1556)

== See also ==
- Timeline of Indian history
