= 1549 in India =

- Centuries: 15th; 16th; 17th; 18th
- Decades: 1520s; 1530s; 1540s; 1550s; 1560s
- See also: List of years in India; Timeline of Indian history

Events from the year 1549 in India.

== Events ==
- Sher Shah Suri's tomb Chinshjh is constructed in Sasaram

== Births ==
- Thomas Stephens, linguist and missionary to Portuguese India is born in Wiltshire, England (dies 1619)

== See also ==
- Timeline of Indian history

== See also ==
- Timeline of Indian history
