= Siege of Calicut (1526) =

- Part of Calicut–Portuguese wars
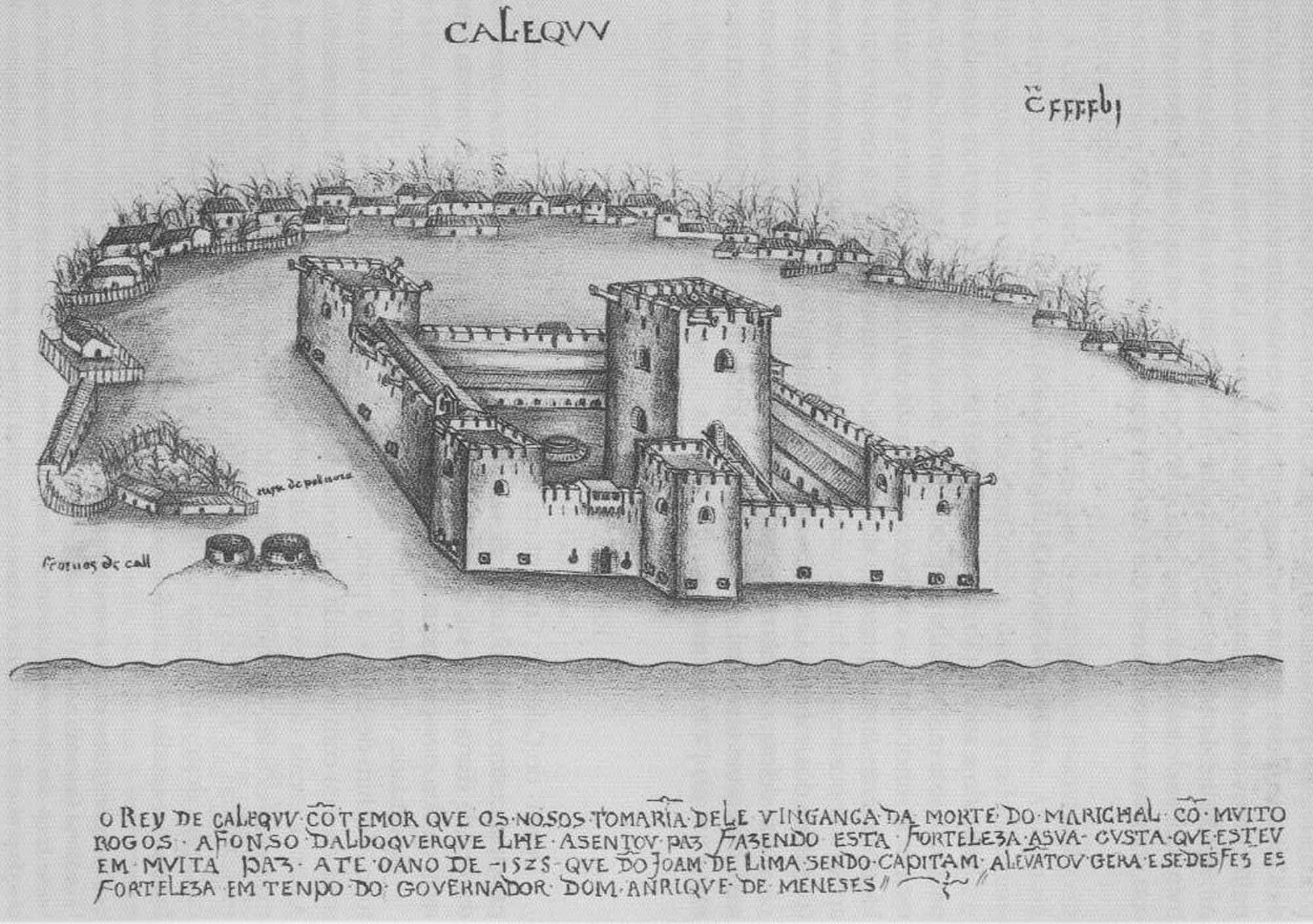
Date	1526
Location	Calicut, Kerala, India
Result	Victory for Zamorin
Territorial changes	Portuguese abandoned the Calicut fort

Belligerents
Calicut	Portuguese Empire

Commanders and leaders
Zamorin	João de Lima

Strength
Unknown	300

The siege of Calicut occurred in 1526, when the Zamorin, the local Indian ruler, captured the fort of Calicut from the Portuguese.

The Portuguese had plans for establishing a fort at Calicut since 1500, when Pedro Álvares Cabral received this mission. The fort was finally completed in 1513, on the spot of an earlier "Serame", after a peace treaty was signed between the king of Portugal and the Zamorin. Hostilities were triggered when Duarte de Menezes attacked and destroyed a fleet of the Zamorin at Ponnani on 26 March 1525.

In reprisal, the Zamorin attacked the fort of Calicut on 3 June 1526. There were 300 Portuguese defenders in the fort, under João de Lima. Reinforcements came from Goa on 20 September, with the intent of embarking the defenders and attacking the troops of the Zamorin.

Faced with the continuous hostility of the Zamorin however, the Portuguese decided to abandon and partly destroy the fort, which was then captured by the Zamorin.

== See also ==
- Portuguese India
