= 1621 in India =

This article is about the particular significance of the year 1621 to India and its people.

== Events ==
- Battle of Rohilla
- 10 year old Jai Singh I ascends to the throne as the Raja of Amber and the head of the Kachwaha Rajputs

== Deaths ==
- Nizamuddin Ahmad, Muslim historian of late medieval India (born 1551)

== See also ==
- Timeline of Indian history
