= 1554 in India =

- Centuries: 15th; 16th; 17th; 18th
- Decades: 1530s; 1540s; 1550s; 1560s; 1570s
- See also: List of years in India; Timeline of Indian history

Events from the year 1554 in India.

== Events ==
- Date unclear – Firuz Shah Suri succeeds Islam Shah Suri as Sultan of Delhi
- Date unclear – Muhammad Adil Shah succeeds Firuz Shah Suri as Sultan of Delhi

== Deaths ==
- 22 November – Islam Shah Suri, Sultan of Delhi
- Date unclear but 12 days or more after 22 November – Firuz Shah Suri, Sultan of Delhi

== See also ==
- Timeline of Indian history
