= Dhamapur Dam =

Dhamapur Lake
- Location within Maharashtra
- Official name: Dhamapur Lake (Wetland code 6073)
- Location: Malvan, Singhdurg, Maharashtra
- Coordinates: 16.0340796°N 73.5932042°E
- Construction began: 1530
- Opening date: 1600
- Owners: Government of Maharashtra, India

Dam and spillways
- Type of dam: Earthfill
- Impounds: local river
- Height: 11 m (36 ft)
- Length: 271 m (889 ft)
- Dam volume: 2,687 km^{3} (645 cu mi)

Reservoir
- Total capacity: 2,441 km^{3} (586 cu mi)
- Surface area: .5 km^{2} (0.19 sq mi)

Dhamapur Dam is an earth-fill dam constructed in 1530 by the villagers and Nagesh Desai, who was Mandlik of the Vijaynagar dynasty. The lake behind the dam is one of the biggest lakes of Sindhudurg district in the state of Maharashtra in India. The lake receives water throughout the year and remains full throughout the year.

== Specifications ==
The height of the dam above lowest foundation is 11 m (36 ft) while the length is 271 m (889 ft). The volume content is 2,687 km^{3} (645 cu mi) and gross storage capacity is 2,867 km^{3} (688 cu mi). The Dhamapur lake has an area of fifty-five acres, and a maximum depth of 37 1/2 feet. Formed by damming a valley with an earthen bank, though the dam leaks considerably, it holds water in all the year round, and shows no tendency to silt. It waters about 500 acres, forty of them garden and the rest rice land.

== History of Forests ==
The Marathas has large shipbuilding yards at Malvan and Vijaydurg. But while they consumed much fine timber, the rulers thought for the future and took steps to preserve the supply. The only valuable teak reserve now left in the south Konkan, 'Bandh tivara' ( Grey mangrove) in the Dapoli sub-division, and the Mhan, Dhamapur and Pendur forest at Malvan were sown by Kanhoji Angre about 1680, and in all their territories his successors stringently enforced forest conservancy .

== Bio-diversity ==
Plankton Diversity of Dhamapur Lake: This report shows that a lentic ecosystem like Dhamapur Lake harbours a rich biodiversity of Planktons. Plankton diversity plays a key role in supporting food-web aquatic ecosystems. Plankton diversity 10 phytoplankton species (7 species of class Chlorophyceae, 1 species of class Euglenophyceae and 2 species of class Myxophycease) and 7 zooplankton species (4 species of Cladocera, 1 species of group Ostracoda and 2 species of group Rotifera) were recorded. Season wise highest diversity of both zooplankton and phytoplankton was observed in the inter-season. As compared to zooplankton, phytoplankton showed marked abundance in Dhamapur Lake.

Checklist of Dhamapur Lake plants: Moist deciduous forest present around the Dhamapur Lake is the Reserve forest under the Sawantwadi Forest Division. Dr Balkrishna Gawade, eminent botanist, along with the Interns of Syamantak "University of Life", led a forest walk on 10 December 2017, to list the plants in and around the Dhamapur Lake. Rare and endangered species like Crotalaria filipes Benth, Gnetum ula Brong and Northopegia colebrookiana (Wight) Blume. In addition to this, the plant Chlorophytum glaucoides Blatt., which is categorised as vulnerable, is located on the banks of the lake too.

== Purpose ==
- Irrigation
- Drinking
- fishing

== Ancient History of Dhamapur ==
As mentioned in Kudaldeshkar Samagr Itihas published by Prabodhan Research Associates, 17, KDGB Niwas, Girgaum, Mumbai.400004 - Page no 277 A dam on Dhamapur lake was built in the year 1530. (धामापूर तलावाचा बांध इ.स १५३० मध्ये बांधला आहे. धामापूर गावाचा 'सहम्यपूर' असा उल्लेख बदामी येथील चालुक्य सम्राट विजयादित्य याच्या नेरूर गावच्या शके ६२२ (इ.स.७००) च्या ताम्रपटलिखित दानपत्रात मिळतो तो असा : "विळी (हि?) गे (भे?) नदितटस्थ: बळळावळीळ ग्राम सहम्यपूर ग्रामयोर्मशयस्थ: नेरूर नानाम्नाग्राम: " - नेरुरच्या एका बाजूला नदीकाठी वालावली आणि दुसऱ्या बाजूस नदी पलीकडे धामापूर अशी गांवे आहेत. )
