= 1538 in India =

- Centuries: 15th; 16th; 17th; 18th
- Decades: 1510s; 1520s; 1530s; 1540s; 1550s
- See also: List of years in India; Timeline of Indian history

Events from the year 1538 in India.

== Events ==
- The Hussain Shahi dynasty ends
- The Siege of Diu occurred in 1538, when an Ottoman imperial fleet attempted to capture the Indian city of Diu, then held by the Portuguese.
- An Ottoman ship landed at the port of Vizhinjam in 1538.

== Deaths ==
- Ghiyasuddin Mahmud Shah, ruler of the Sultanate of Bengal

== See also ==
- Timeline of Indian history
