= 1840 in India =

- Centuries: 17th; 18th; 19th; 20th; 21st
- Decades: 1820s; 1830s; 1840s; 1850s; 1860s
- See also: List of years in India; Timeline of Indian history

This article details events in the year 1840 in India. Occurrences include the establishment of the Bank of Bombay, and the fall of the Maqpon dynasty.

== Incumbents ==
- The Earl of Auckland, Governor-General, 1836–1842.
- Alexander Cunningham, aide-de-camp to Lord Auckland, 1836–1840
- William Henry Sykes, director at the East India Company, 1840–1867
- Sir John Keane, Lieutenant-General of the Bombay Army, 1834–1840
- Sir Thomas McMahon, Lieutenant-General of the Bombay Army, 1840–1847
- George Russell Clerk, Political Agent at Lahore, 1840
- Zirat Prasad, regent of Bhaisunda, 1829–1840
- Nau Nihal Singh, Maharaja of the Sikh Empire, 1839–1840
- Chand Kaur, Maharaja of the Sikh Empire, 1840–1841
- Bhao Rao Phanse, Dewan of Indore State, 1839–1840
- Narayan Rao Palshikar, Dewan of Indore State, 1840–October 1841
- Raghuji Bohonsle III, Maratha of Nagpur, 1818–1853
- Gaya Prasad, Chaube of Taraon State, 1812–1840
- Kamta Prasad, Chaube of Taraon State, 1840–1856
- Anand Rao Puar "Rao Sahib", Raja of Dewas State, 1817–1840
- Haibat Rao Puar, Raja of Dewas State, 1840–12 May 1864
- Dariao Singh, Rao of Paldeo, 1812–1840
- Nathu Ram, Rao of Paldeo, 1840
- Raja Ram, Rao of Paldeo, 1840–October 1842
- Sir Claude Martin Wade, first Resident of the Indore Residency, 1840–1844
- Pritam Singh, Rana of Kumharsain, 1840–1858
- Shiv Saran Singh, Rana of Baghal State, 1828–16 January 1840
- Kishan Singh, Rana of Baghal State, 1840–12 March 1875
- Jashwant Singh, Raja of Nabha State, December 1783–21 May 1840
- Devendra Singh, Raja of Nabha State, 21 May 1840 – 18 September 1846
- Kandhaji IV, Thakur Sahib of Palitana State, 1820–1840
- Nonghanji IV, Thakur Sahib of Palitana State, 1824–1860

== Events ==
- National income – ₹7,560 million
- First Anglo-Afghan War, 1837–1842
- East India Company initiated the tea trade in Chittagong
- Bundelkhand Agency oversees Jalaun's annexation in accordance with the doctrine of lapse
- Jaitpur State, founded in 1731, is disestablished
- Maqpon falls to Dogra
- Jessop & Company completes construction of the first iron bridge in British India, Loha-ka-Pul over River Gomti at Lucknow, 1812–1840
- Bank of Bombay is founded on 15 April 1840
- Chawri Bazar, a specialized wholesale market of brass, copper, and paper products, is established in North Delhi
- Bankura Zilla School is established in West Bengal
- Our Lady of Lourdes Church, Tiruchirappalli, is consecrated in Tamil Nadu
- Enchey Monastery was established
- From 3–4 March 1840, Ayya Vaikundar's followers carry him to Swamithoppe from Thiruvananthapuram in a Vahana after encountering King Swathi Thirunal
- Tuvayal Pandarams begins the Tuvayal Thavasu at Vakaippathi as per the instructions of Vaikundar
- The first Kodiyettru Thirunal is celebrated in Swamithope pathi in August/September while, according to Ayyavazhi doctrine, Ayya unified the Seven Virgins into himself as per their request
- In December, Hari Gopalan Citar awoke following an abnormal dream in which God commissioned him to write the Akilam by giving him the first syllable of The Kappu
- 4th Cavalry is converted to East India Company service as the 6th Bengal Irregular Cavalry

== Law ==
- Lex Loci Report of October 1840 emphasised the importance and necessity of uniformity in the codification of Indian law, relating to crimes, evidences, and contract but it recommended that personal laws of Hindus and Muslims should be kept outside such codification.
- Crown Land (Encroachment) Ordinance vested all forests, wastes, unoccupied, and uncultivated lands to the crown
- East India Trade Act 1840 is passed in the United Kingdom
- Insolvent Debtors, India Act 1840 is passed in the United Kingdom

== Births ==
- Zamindar Rohim Boksh Haji, managed the Bhawal Estate
- Robert Lang, English amateur cricketer, born 6 April 1840 at Jessore, India
- Henry Conwell Wood, born in Bellary, Member of the Queensland Legislative Council

== Deaths ==
- Henry Fane, Commander-in-Chief, India, 1835-1839, died on 24 March 1840
- Nau Nihal Singh, Maharajah of the Sikh Empire, died on 6 November 1840
- Gaya Prasad, Chaube of Taraon State
- Jashwant Singh, Raja of Nabha State, died on 21 May 1840
- Maqpon King Ahmed Shah, killed by Dogra Empire
- Haji Shariatullah, founder of the Faraizi movement, died in Dacca
