= 1839 in India =

- Centuries: 17th; 18th; 19th; 20th; 21st
- Decades: 1810s; 1820s; 1830s; 1840s; 1850s
- See also: List of years in India; Timeline of Indian history

This article details events occurring in the year 1839 in India. Major events include the reduction of the Khanate of Kalat to a subsidiary ally of the British, and the capture of Aden in Yemen by the East India Company, creating an important stopover for voyages between Europe and India.

== Incumbents ==
- The Earl of Auckland, Governor-General, 1836-42.
- Alexander Cunningham, aide-de-camp to Lord Auckland, 1836-1840
- Sir John Keane, Lieutenant-General of the Bombay Army, 1834-1840
- Zirat Prasad, regent of Bhaisunda, 1829-1840
- Nau Nihal Singh, Maharaja of the Sikh Empire, 1839-1840
- Bhao Rao Phanse, Dewan of Indore State, 1839-1840
- Raghuji Bohonsle III, Maratha of Nagpur, 1818-1853
- Gaya Prasad, Chaube of Taraon State, 1812-1840
- Anand Rao Puar "Rao Sahib", Raja of Dewas State, 1817-1840
- Dariao Singh, Rao of Paldeo, 1812-1840
- Shiv Saran Singh, Rana of Baghal State, 1828-16 January 1840
- Jashwant Singh, Raja of Nabha State, December 1783-21 May 1840
- Kandhaji IV, Thakur Sahib of Palitana State, 1820-1840
- Nonghanji IV, Thakur Sahib of Palitana State, 1824-1860
- Henry Fane, Commander-in-Chief, India, 1835-1839
- Gaya Prasad, Chaube of Taraon State
- Anand Rao Puar "Rao Sahib", Raja of Dewas State
- Shiv Saran Singh, Rana of Baghal State
- Jashwant Singh, Raja of Nabha State
- Ahmed Shah, King of the Maqpon dynasty
- Chandrasinhji II Kesarisinhji, Maharana Raj Sahib of the Wankaner State, 1787-1839
- Vakhatsinhji Chandrasinhji, Maharana Raj Sahib of the Wankaner State, 1839-1842
- Ranjit Singh, founder and Maharajah of the Sikh Empire, 1780-1839
- Kharak Singh, Maharajah of the Sikh Empire, 1839-1840
- Jashwant Singh, Rana of Alirajpur State, 1818-17 March 1862
- Raja Zalim Sen, Raja of Mandi State, 1826-1839
- Raja Balbir Sen, Raja of Mandi, 1839-1851
- Bhup Deo, Raja of Kanker State, 1818-1839
- Padma Deo, Raja of Kanker State, 1839–1853
- Major-General William Henry Sleeman heads the Thuggee and Dacoity Department from February 1839

== Events ==
- First Anglo-Afghan War, 1837–1842
- Battle of Ghazni, part of the First Anglo-Afghan War, occurs on 23 July 1839 in Ghazni, Afghanistan
- East India Company forces capture Aden to provide a coaling station for ships en route to India, founding the Aden Colony
- Khanate of Kalat is reduced to a subsidiary alliance with the British Empire, self-governing under Khans
- British India Society is founded in England
- Jessop & Company work on construction of the first iron bridge in British India, Loha-ka-Pul over River Gomti at Lucknow, 1812–1840
- 36th Jacob's Horse, a unit cavalry of the British Indian Army, is established
- Feast of Saint Raphael, Ollur is held for the first time in Ollur, near Thrissur, Kerala
- The cornerstone for St. Paul's Cathedral, Kolkata is laid
- Bishop Hodges Higher Secondary School is established
- St. Mary's Anglo-Indian Higher Secondary School is established
- St. Paul's Church, Landour is established
- Thomas John Newbold is appointed deputy assistant adjutant-general and postmaster to the field force of the East India Company
- John Nicholson, then a cadet in the East India Company's Bengal Infantry, reaches India
- Sambad Prabhakar, a weekly newspaper, became a daily newspaper
- The Statue of Thomas Munro was shipped to Madras
- Mr. Grange (Sub Assistant to the Commissioner at Nowgong) lead the first expedition to the Naga Hills (Mezoma and Khonoma)

== Law ==
- Interest Act

== Births ==
- July - Baba Jaimal Singh, Founder of Radha Soami Satsang Beas (died 29 December 1903).
- Allan Webb in Calcutta, second Bishop of Bloemfontein, baptised on 17 November
- William Francis Frederick Waller, recipient of the Victoria Cross, born at Dagoolie, India on 20 August 1839
- Hanson Jarrett, recipient of the Victoria Cross, on 22 March in Madras
- Hugh Shaw, recipient of the Victoria Cross, on 4 February in Madras
- Jamsetji Tata, pioneer industrialist, who founded the Tata Group, India's biggest conglomerate company, on 3 March in Navsari, Baroda, Bombay Presidency

== Deaths ==
- Ranjit Singh, first Maharajah of the Sikh Empire, on 27 June 1839 in Lahore, Punjab, Sikh Empire
- Sankara Varman, astronomer-mathematician belonging to the Kerala school of astronomy and mathematics
- George Havell, a painter
- Chandrasinhji II Kesarisinhji, Maharana Raj Sahib of the Wankaner State
- Jean-François Allard, French soldier and adventurer, in Punjab, Sikh Empire
- William Francklin, English orientalist and army officer, on 12 April
- Raja Zalim Sen, Raja of Mandi State, died in June 1839
- Bhup Deo, Raja of Kanker State
