= 1837 in India =

- Centuries: 17th; 18th; 19th; 20th; 21st
- Decades: 1810s; 1820s; 1830s; 1840s; 1850s
- See also: List of years in India; Timeline of Indian history

Events in the year 1837 in India.

== Incumbents ==
- The Earl of Auckland, Governor-General, 1836-42.
- Alexander Cunningham, aide-de-camp to Lord Auckland, 1836-1840
- Sir John Keane, Lieutenant-General of the Bombay Army, 1834-1840
- Zirat Prasad, regent of Bhaisunda, 1829-1840
- Raghuji Bohonsle III, Maratha of Nagpur, 1818-1853
- Gaya Prasad, Chaube of Taraon State, 1812-1840
- Anand Rao Puar "Rao Sahib", Raja of Dewas State, 1817-1840
- Dariao Singh, Rao of Paldeo, 1812-1840
- Shiv Saran Singh, Rana of Baghal State, 1828-16 January 1840
- Jashwant Singh, Raja of Nabha State, December 1783-21 May 1840
- Kandhaji IV, Thakur Sahib of Palitana State, 1820-1840
- Nonghanji IV, Thakur Sahib of Palitana State, 1824-1860

== Events ==
- First Anglo-Afghan War, 1837-1842
- Jessop & Company complete construction of the first iron bridge in British India, Loha-ka-Pul over River Gomti at Lucknow, 1812-1840
- April - Peasants from Sullia and Puttur carried out Amara Sullia Rebellion against British Raj and took over South Canara administration for two weeks under the leadership of Kedambadi Ramaiah Gowda.

== Law ==
- Native Emigrants Act
- Custom House Act

== Births ==
- Herbert Mills Birdwood, Governor of Bombay, born in Belgaum
- Valentine Bambrick, recipient of the Victorian Cross, born on 13 April 1837 in Cawnpore
