= 1838 in India =

- Centuries: 17th; 18th; 19th; 20th; 21st
- Decades: 1810s; 1820s; 1830s; 1840s; 1850s
- See also: List of years in India; Timeline of Indian history

This list details events in the year 1838 in India. Major events include the Agra famine of 1837–1838 and the founding of The Times of India on 3 November.

== Incumbents ==
- The Earl of Auckland, Governor-General, 1836–42.
- Alexander Cunningham, aide-de-camp to Lord Auckland, 1836–1840
- Sir John Keane, Lieutenant-General of the Bombay Army, 1834–1840
- Zirat Prasad, regent of Bhaisunda, 1829–1840
- Raghuji Bohonsle III, Maratha of Nagpur, 1818–1853
- Gaya Prasad, Chaube of Taraon State, 1812–1840
- Anand Rao Puar "Rao Sahib", Raja of Dewas State, 1817–1840
- Dariao Singh, Rao of Paldeo, 1812–1840
- Shiv Saran Singh, Rana of Baghal State, 1828-16 January 1840
- Jashwant Singh, Raja of Nabha State, December 1783-21 May 1840
- Kandhaji IV, Thakur Sahib of Palitana State, 1820–1840
- Nonghanji IV, Thakur Sahib of Palitana State, 1824–1860
- Henry Fane, Commander-in-Chief, India, 1835–1839
- Chandrasinhji II Kesarisinhji, Maharana Raj Sahib of the Wankaner State, 1787–1839
- Ranjit Singh, founder and Maharajah of the Sikh Empire, 1780–1839
- Jashwant Singh, Rana of Alirajpur State, 1818-17 March 1862
- Raja Zalim Sen, Raja of Mandi State, 1826–1839
- Bhup Deo, Raja of Kanker State, 1818–1839

== Events ==
- First Anglo-Afghan War, 1837–1842
- The Times of India is founded on 3 November
- Jhalawar State is founded in the Hadoti region
- Agra famine of 1837–38 kills 800,000 people in the North-Western Provinces
- Afghan Church founded in Mumbai
- Basel Evangelical School is founded
- Jessop & Company work on the construction of the first iron bridge in British India, Loha-ka-Pul over the River Gomti at Lucknow, 1812–1840

== Law ==
- Coasting Vessels Act

== Births ==
- Sultan Shah Jahan, Begum of Bhopal, Nawab of Bhopal, born on 29 July 1838
- Jaswant Singh II, Maharaja of Jodhpur, born in Himatnagar
- Gaurakisora Dasa Babaji, acharya from the Gaudiya Vaishnava tradition of Hinduism
- Bankim Chandra Chattopadhyay, Bengali writer, poet, and journalist, born on 27 June in Naihati, Bengal
- Hormusjee Naorojee Mody, Parsi-Hongkonger businessman, born on 12 October 1838 in Bombay
- William Ellison Boggs, chancellor of the University of Georgia, born in Ahmedunggar on 12 May 1838
- Valentine Cameron Prinsep, British Pre-Raphaelite painter, born on 14 February 1838 in Calcutta
- Colonel Charles Swinhoe, English naturalist and lepidopterist who served in the British Army in India, born on 27 August 1838 in Calcutta

== Deaths ==
- Mubarak Ali Khan II, Nawab of Bengal, died on 3 October
- Shahaji I, ruler of Kolhapur State, on 29 November
