= Zahur Hossain Chowdhury =

- Died: 1980
- Occupation: journalist

Zahur Hossain Chowdhury (died 1980) was a Bangladeshi journalist. He was awarded Ekushey Padak in 1981 by the Government of Bangladesh for his contribution to journalism.

== Career ==
Chowdhury started his career in the Indian newspaper The Statesman. He became the editor of The Sangbad in 1954. Other journalists like Ranesh Das Gupta, Satyen Sen, Santosh Gupta, Kamal Lohani and Mohammad Farhad also joined the Sangbad.

Chowdhury also served as an editor of The Bangladesh Observer.

== Awards ==
- Ekushey Padak (1981)
