= Ranesh Das Gupta =

Indian politician

- রণেশ দাশগুপ্ত
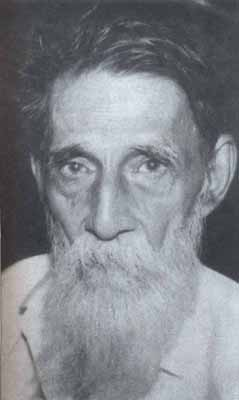
- Born: 15 January 1912; Dibrugarh, Assam, British India
- Died: 4 November 1997 (aged 85); Kolkata, West Bengal, India
- Education: Kolkata City College
- Occupations: Writer, journalist, politician

Ranesh Das Gupta (15 January 1912 – 4 November 1997) was a Bangladeshi writer, journalist, and politician. He was posthumously awarded the Ekushey Padak in 1998 by the Government of Bangladesh. He was one of the founders of the cultural organization Bangladesh Udichi Shilpigoshthi.

== Background and education ==
Gupta was born to Apurboratna Dasgupta and Indroprova Devi. He got his early education from Pathshala of Ramananda Pundit in Purulia. In 1929, he passed matriculation from Bankura Zilla School and passed ISC examination from Kolkata City College.

== Career ==
Gupta started his career as a journalist at the weekly Sonar Bangla. In 1958, he was elected a Commissioner of Dhaka City Corporation. He was jailed for his political views for nine years. He worked in The Sangbad.

Along with Satyen Sen, Gupta founded the cultural organization Bangladesh Udichi Shilpigoshthi on 29 October 1968.

== Works ==
- Upanyaser Shilparup
- Shilpir Swadhinatar Proxne
- Latin Americar Mukti Sangram
- Sedin Sakale Dhakai
- Rahmaner Ma and Anyanna
- Muktidhara
- Samyabadi Utthan
- Sajjad Jahir
- Kakhano Champa Kakhono Atosi
