= Raja Rajendra Singh =

Rajendra Singh
- Raja
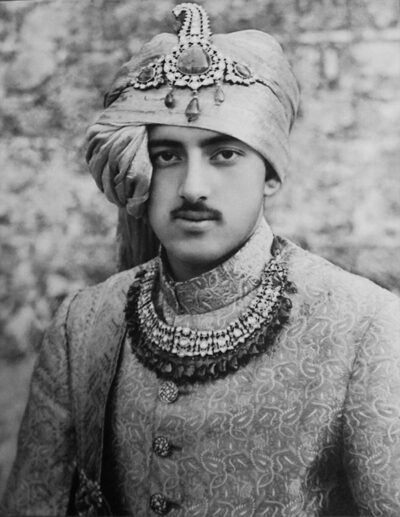
- Raja Shri Rajendra Singh of Baghal

Raja of Baghal
- Reign: 1946 - 28 December 1971
- Predecessor: Surendra Singh
- Successor: Harshvardhan Singh (titular Raja of Baghal)
- Born: 29 February 1928
- Died: 7 June 2010 (aged 82); Arki, Himachal Pradesh, India
- Consort: Tara Devi
- Children (s): Pramod Singh; Narendra Singh; Sunita Devi
- House: Parmar Rajput
- Father: Surendra Singh
- Mother: Laxmi Devi
- Religion: Hinduism

Raja Rajendra Singh (29 February 1928 – 7 June 2010) was the Raja of Baghal from 1946 until 1971.
