= 1842 in India =

- Centuries: 17th; 18th; 19th; 20th; 21st
- Decades: 1820s; 1830s; 1840s; 1850s; 1860s
- See also: List of years in India; Timeline of Indian history

Events in the year 1842 in India.

== Incumbents ==
- The Earl of Ellenborough, Governor-General, 1842–44.

== Events ==
- 1st Afghan War, 1837–42.

== Births ==
- 16 January – Mahadev Govind Ranade, judge, author and reformer (died 1901).

== Deaths ==
- Undated
  - William Francis Thompson, British India civil servant, magistrate and philologist
