= Arki Fort =

Hill fort in Himachal Pradesh, India

Coordinates: 31.152543°N 76.966374°E

- Part of Himachal Pradesh
- Arki, Himachal Pradesh, India
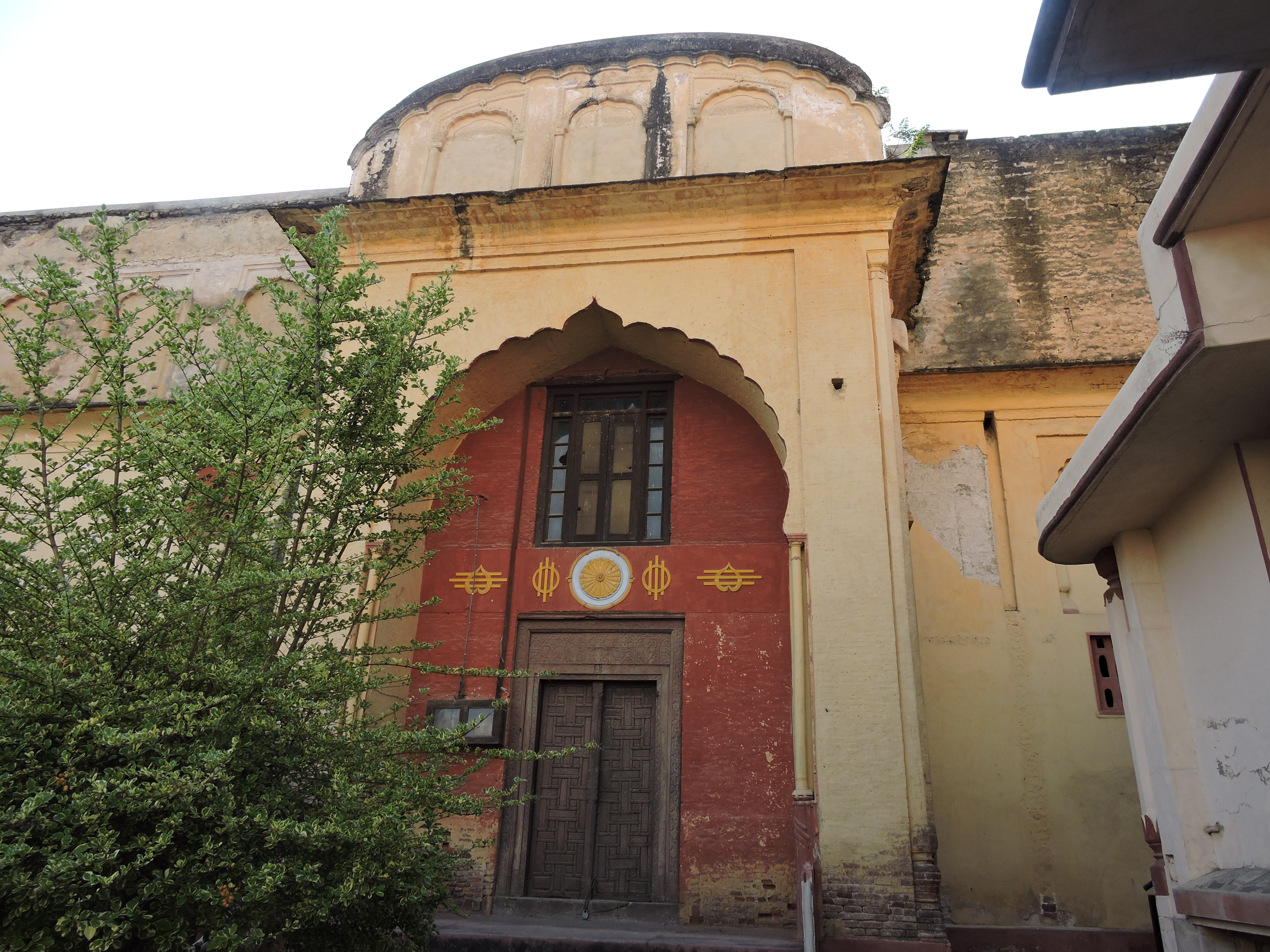
- Arki Fort

Site information
- Type: Fort
- Controlled by: Private
- Condition: Ruins

Site history
- Built: 1695 - 1700 CE
- Built by: Rana Prithvi Singh
- Materials: Granite Stones and lime mortar

The Arki Fort is a historic hill fort located in Arki, Solan district, Himachal Pradesh, India. It was constructed in late 17th century and served as the palace and military stronghold of the rulers of the Baghal State (also known as Bhakhal). The Fort was captured by the Gurkhas in 1806. Rana Jagat Singh, the ruler of Baghal had to take refuge in Nalagarh. During this period from 1806 - 1815, the Gurkha General Amar Singh Thapa used Arki as his stronghold to make further advances into Himachal Pradesh as far as Kangra. Arki became the capital of Baghal in the 17th century and remained so until the British era. The fort complex, set on a forested ridge, features a multi-storeyed palace, courtyards, and richly decorated halls. It is noted for its blend of Rajput and Mughal architectural elements and for its surviving Pahari (Himalayan school) murals.

== History ==
Arki Fort was founded by Parmar (Panwar) Rajput, and was as the capital of the Baghal State from 1650. Bahghal was established by Rana Ajai Dev in 1643. Under Rana Sabha Chand, Arki was made the state capital and a stone palace was constructed in 1700. It was expanded in 1800 by Rana Prthvi Singh from the existing stone palace and further fortifications.

In the early 19th century, there was a political shift in Arki due to regional conflicts. Rana Jagar Singh ruled over the place from 1778 AD, but seized by Nepal's Gurkha army in 1806. It forced Rana Jagat Singh to flee to the neighboring state of Nalagarh. The Gurkhas (led by Amar Singh Thapa) held the Arki as their local headquarters for a decade. Rana Jagat Singh later allied with the British in 1814 – 1815 and with the alliance of East India Company and Nalagarh, he reconquered Arki and took control over Arki fort in September 1815. Subsequently, Rana Jagat Singh's successors (Shiv Saran Singh, Kishan Singh, etc.) continued to rule Baghal under British Empire. In the 19th century Rana Shiv Saran Singh added new halls and expanded the fort. Diwan-i-Khas (Hall of Private Audience) was erected in 1830. In 1850, under Raja Kishan Singh (r.1840–1875), The Diwan-i-Khas and other halls were painted with frescoes in Pahari painting style in 1850 under Raja Kishan Singh. These murals, depicting scenes from Hindu epics like Mahabhagavata Purana, Shiva Parvati, etc.

After Indian independence, Baghal acceded to India on 15 April 1948. Arki Fort lost its administrative role but remained in the hands of the former royal family. Through the 20th century much of the structure fell into disrepair, though some parts remained occupied or used for ceremonial purposes by the Baghal. The fort was later converted into a heritage site www.arkipalace.com, leading to partial restoration and conversion of portions into a tourist lodge.

== Architecture and Structure ==
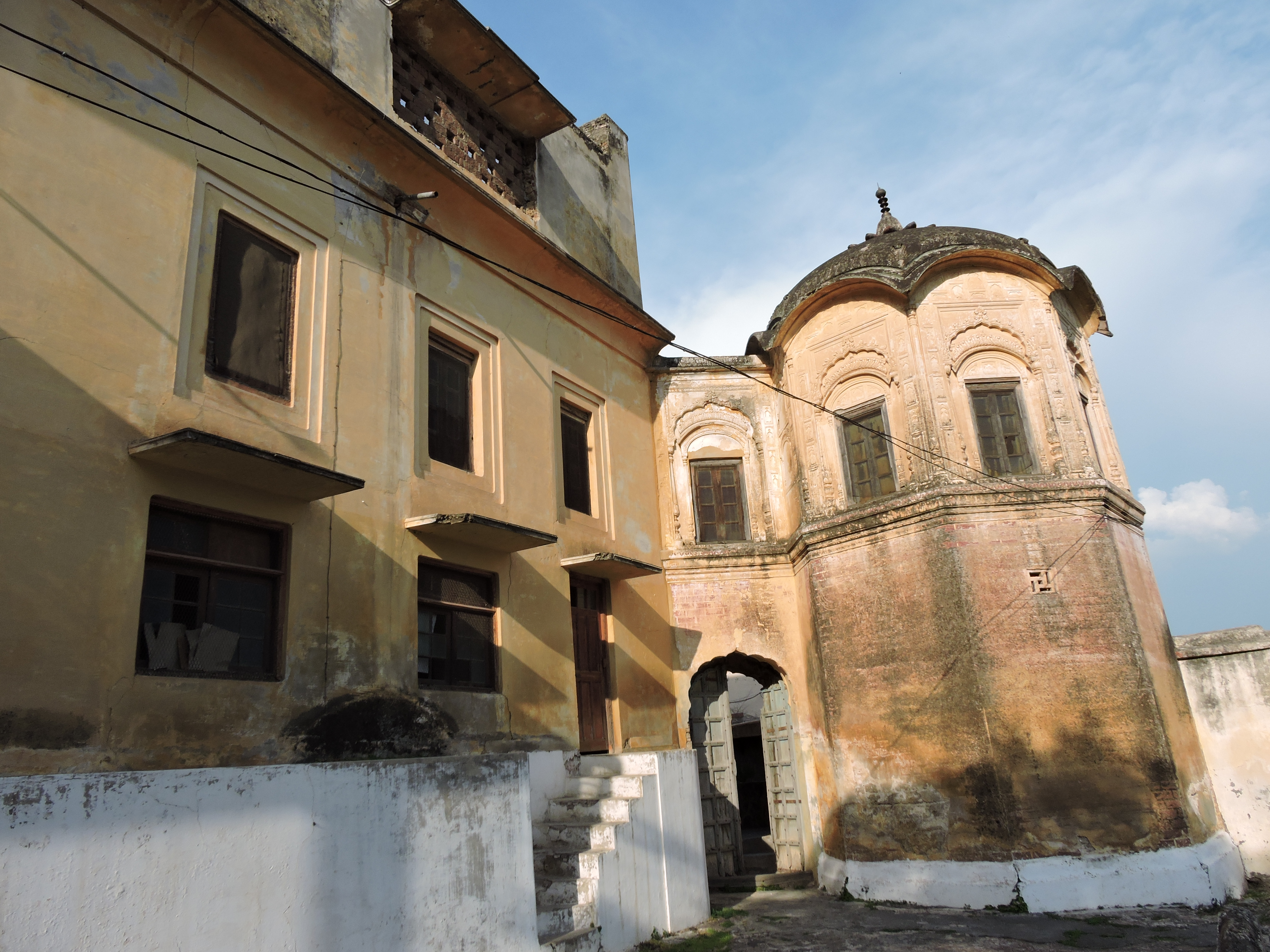
Side view of Arki Fort

Arki Fort is a compact fortified palace complex built of local stone, rising from a wooded hillock. Architectural design combines Rajput and Mughal architecture elements. The fort is are constructed with thick sandstone walls and modest defensive battlements, typical of hill forts in the Himalayan region. At the same time, the structure incorporates the details like carved wooden brackets and ornate columns, blending the strength with elegance. The complex originally consisted a central courtyard and several interconnected wings around it. The main palace was two storeys high, with the ground floor had administrative chambers and the upper floor contained the royal apartments and audience halls. A high stone wall encloses the palace area. According to art-historical descriptions, Arki has “a fortress-palace” appearance and it was well known as “an imposing structure on the southern slope of a precipitous hill,” with the town. Some sources mention that, there used to be five major building blocks within the complex, including the Diwan-i-Aam (public hall), Diwan-i-Khas, durbar hall, private quarters, and service areas, though many are now ruined.

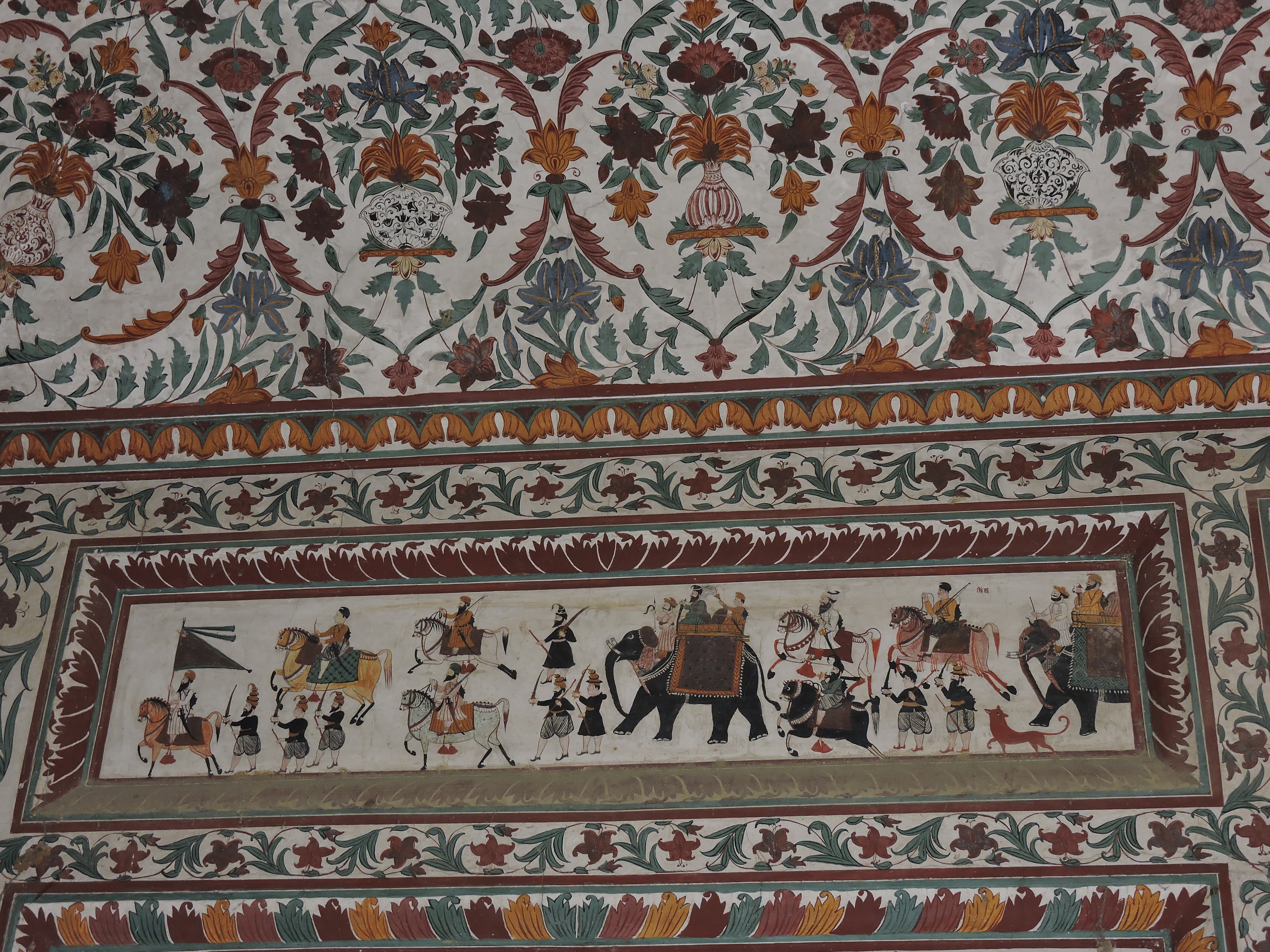
Interior designing in Arki Palace

Diwan-i-Khas (private audience hall), built in 1830 was a well ornamented structure in the Fort palace. This hall has carved wooden pillars and gilt decoration, and its walls and ceilings are covered with fresco paintings. The paintings were painted during the rule of Raja Kishan Singh. These Palhari paintings depict epic and romantic scenes like Krishna with gopis, episodes of the Ramayana, and Nayak–Nayika love themes. The art resemble a fusion of Rajput and Mughal architectural styles and shows a heavy influence of Rajasthan. It is observed that Arki's Pahari-style murals were earlier influenced by the Basohli school and later by the Kangra paintings. Other halls and private chambers also display frescoes and decorative plasterwork. A richly carved wooden door, which was now placed at Shimla museum was from the old fort entrance. There is a small courtyard in the ground floor with a water tank. The palace's roof has a line of carved Cornice and Chhatri (pavilions) in Rajasthani style. A small temple dedicated to Lakshmi Narayan (Vishnu), was erectlocated within the fort precincts. The view from the Cliffend Bar on the terrace is used an as observation deck to see hills from nearby towns and villages.

== Recent Developments ==
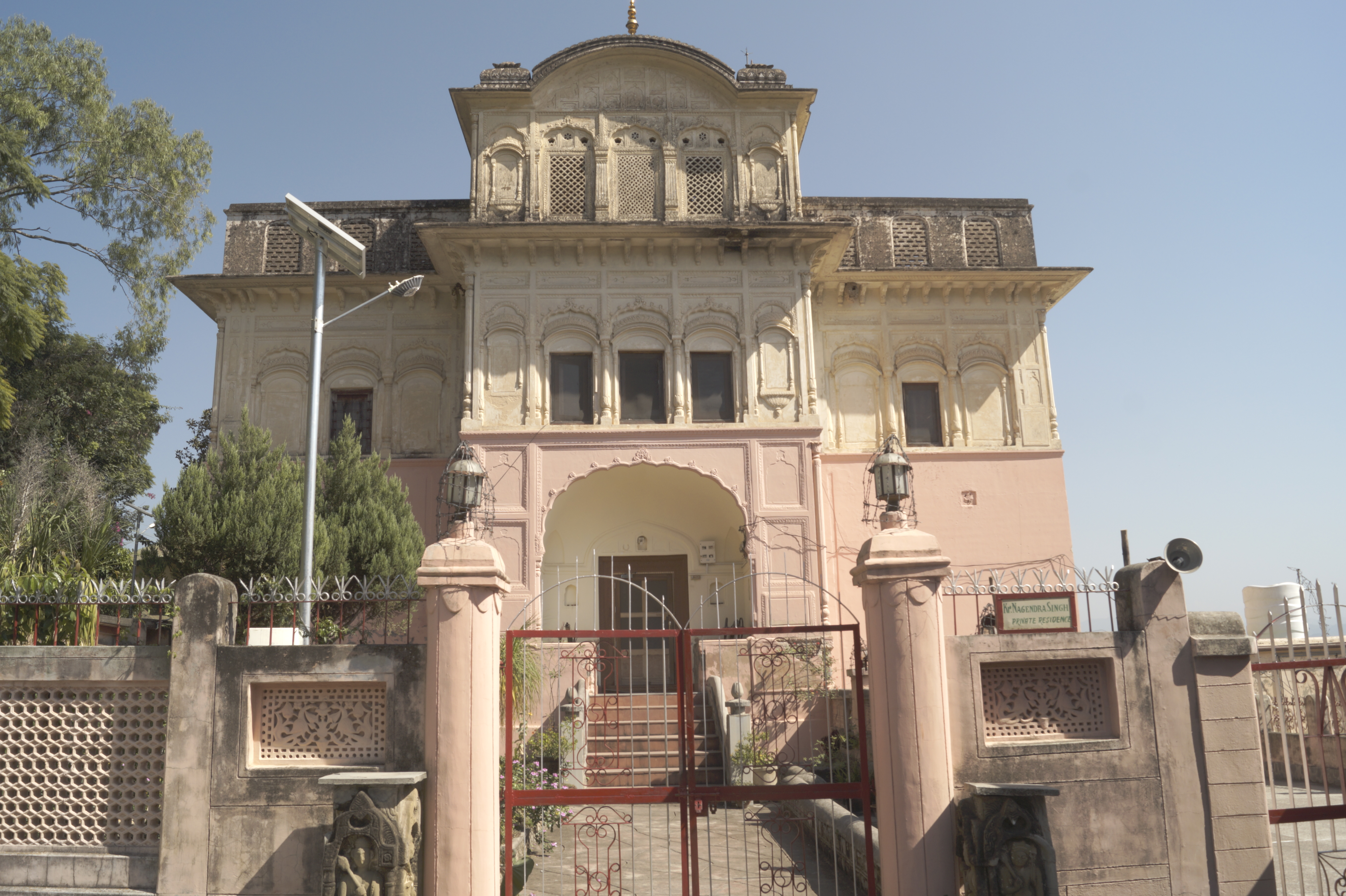
Part of Palace of Arki/Bhagal princely state, now residence of its legal heirs

In the late 20th century, the palace got leased and converted into tourist accommodation. In 2010, a portion of the fort, referred as "Arki Palace" or Padam Lakshmi Niwas, was started functioning as a small heritage hotel. The ownership of the Arki Fort remains largely private and the heirs of the Baghal rajas still reside in a part of the complex. In 2023, the Archaeological Survey of India allocated funds for conservation of several monuments in Himachal Pradesh.

== Gallery ==
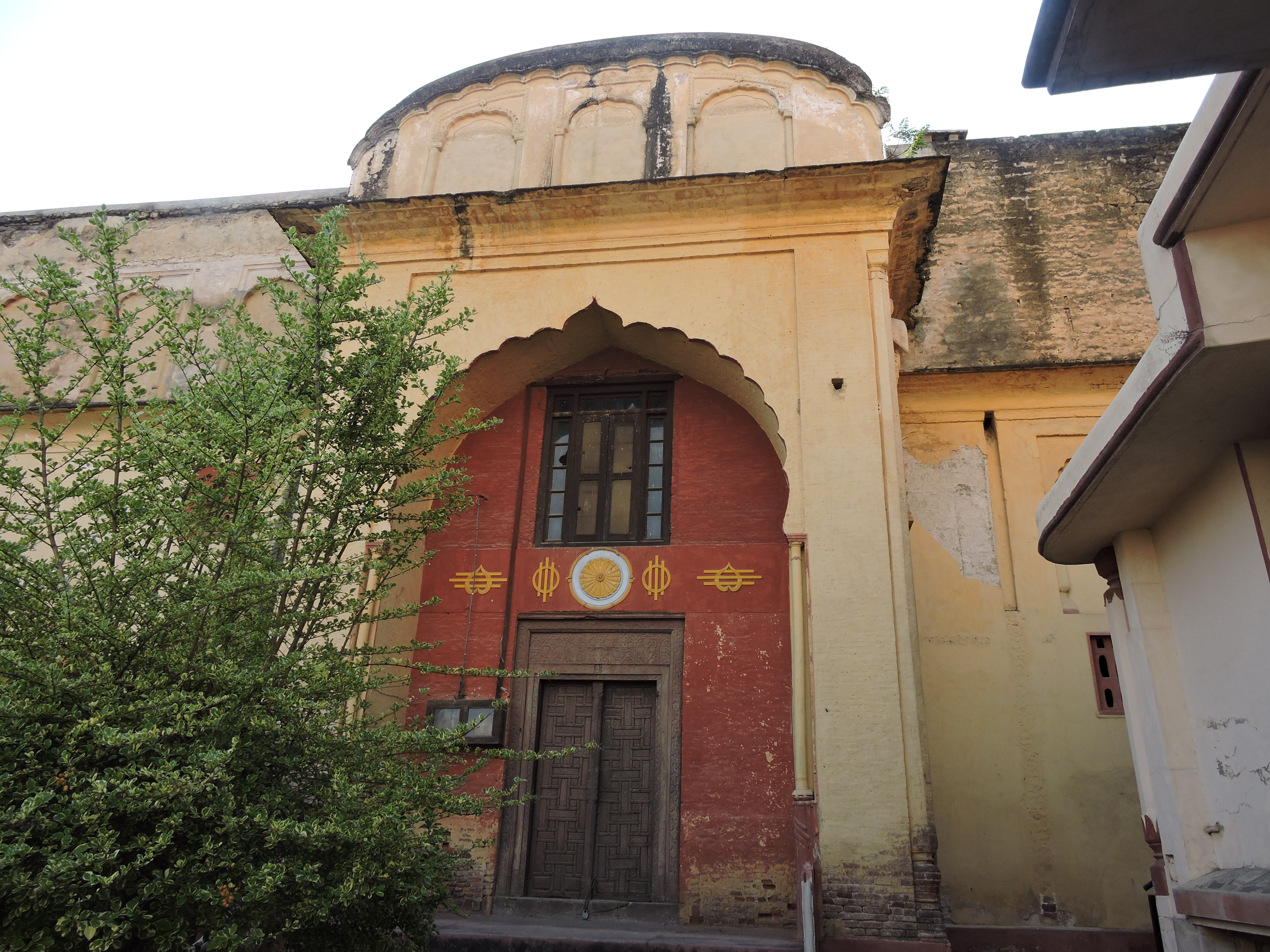
Arki Palace, Capital city of Baghal State

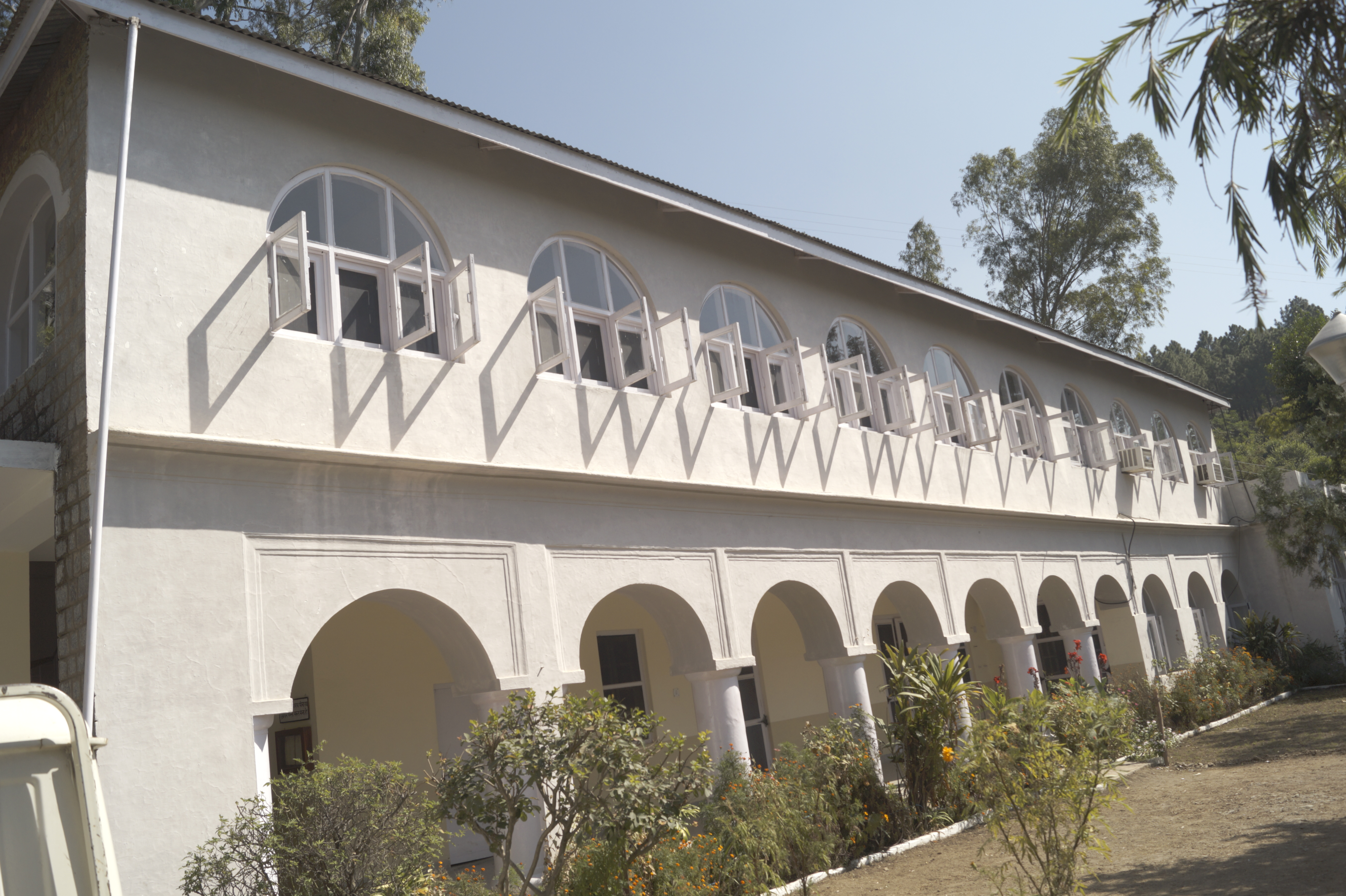
PWD rest house, Arki, Himachal Pradesh, India

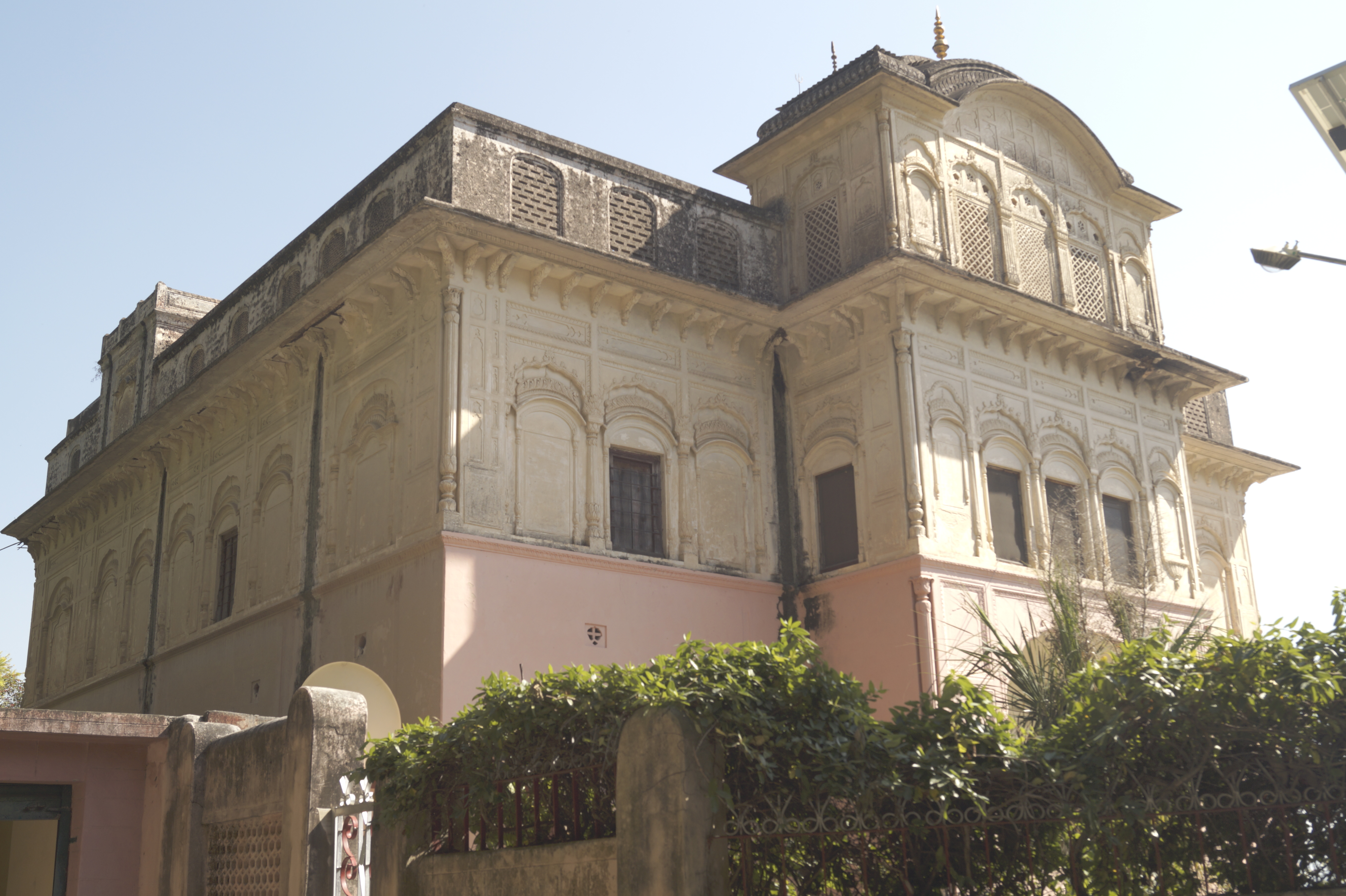
A side view of part of Palace of Arki/Bhagal Palace

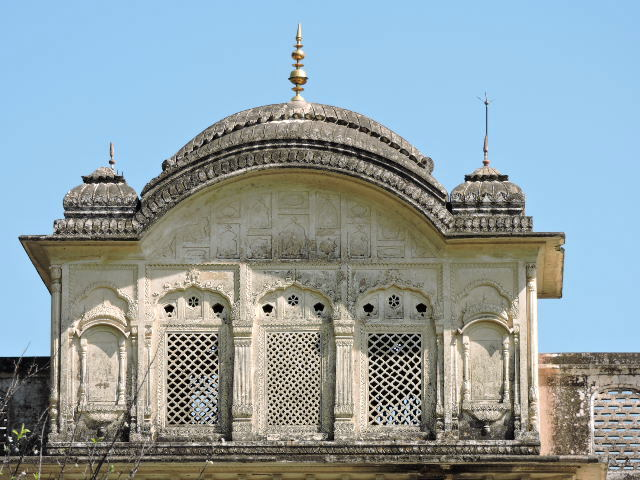
Design of top of palace of Arki/Bhagal Princely State

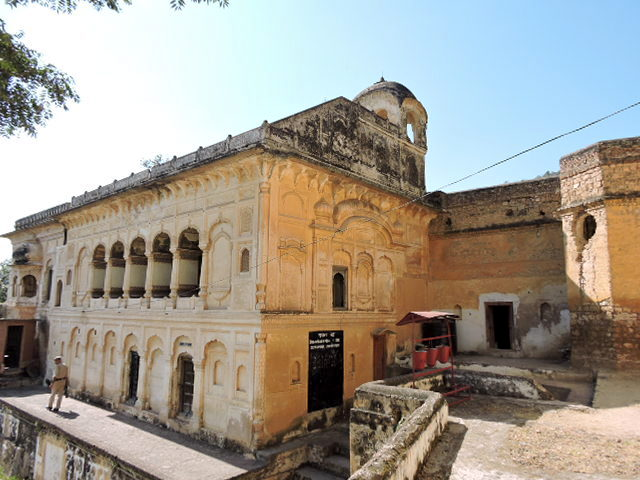
Diwan E Aam, general assembly hall, Arki/Bhagal Princely State

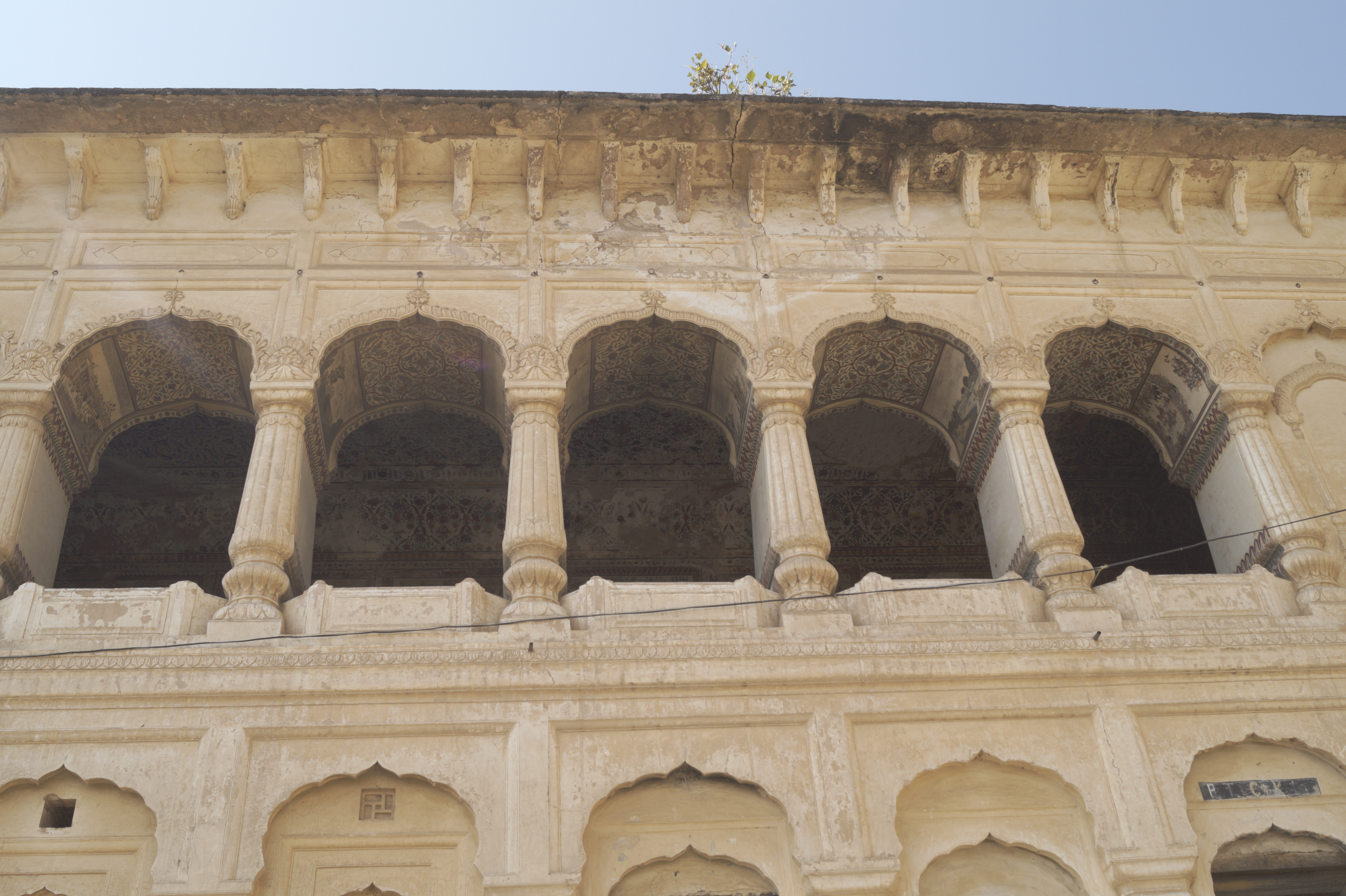
Design and wall painting of the palace of Arki/Bhagal Princely State
