= Arki, India =

Arki
- Town
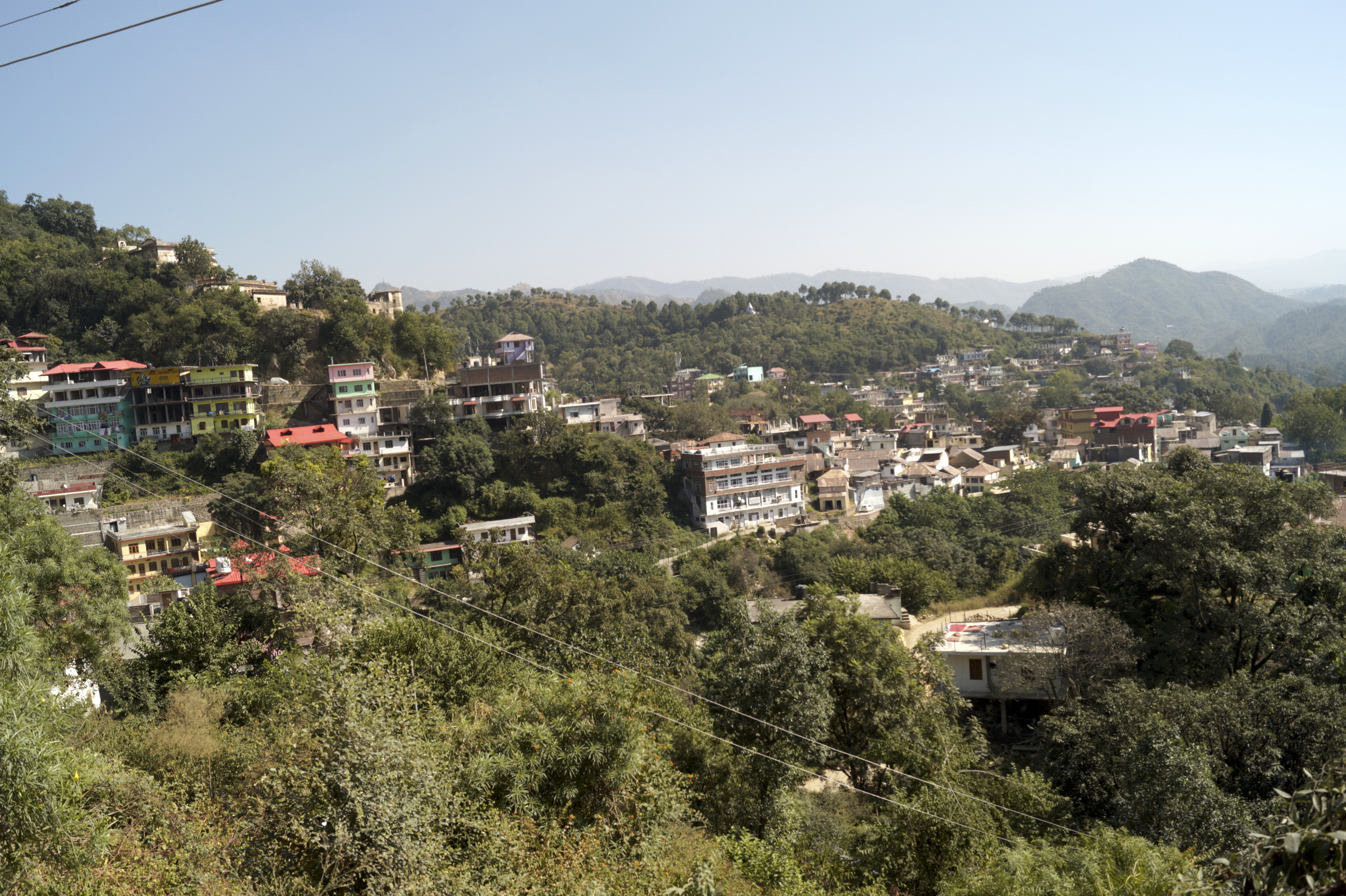
- Arki town (October 2016)

- Location in Himachal Pradesh, India Arki (India)
- Coordinates: 31.15°N 76.97°E
- Country: India
- State: Himachal Pradesh
- District: Solan

Government
  - Type: Nagar Panchayat
- Elevation: 1,045 m (3,428 ft)

Population (2011)
  - Total: 3,040

Languages
  - Official: Hindi
  - Native: Mahasui (Baghliani)
- Time zone: UTC+5:30 (IST)
- Postal code: 173208
- Telephone code: 01796
- Vehicle registration: HP-11

Arki is a town, tehsil and Nagar panchayat in the Solan district of Himachal Pradesh, India. The town is known for its fort, built in the late 18th century when Arki was the capital of the princely hill state of Baghal.

== History ==
Arki was the capital of the princely Hill state of Baghal, which was founded by Rana Ajai Dev, a Panwar Rajput from Dhar state in Central India. The state was founded in the 11th century and Arki was declared its capital by Rana Sabha Chand in 1643. Its main attraction, Arki Fort is now a heritage hotel managed by the ruling family.

The fort was captured by the Gurkhas in 1806. Rana Jagat Singh, the ruler of Baghal, had to take refuge in Nalagarh. From 1806 to 1815, the Gurkha General Amar Singh Thapa held Arki as his headquarters to make further advances into Himachal Pradesh as far as Kangra.

The Gurkhas were, however, driven out by Rana Jagat Singh, assisted by Sir David Ochterlony and the British forces during the Gurkha War in 1815–1816. Thereafter, Rana Jagat Singh regained control of Arki.

Rana Kishan Singh, who ruled the state from 1840 to 1867, developed the town of Arki in a planned manner. The Rana was a far-sighted ruler and built horse and mule tracks to connect Arki with Shimla and Bilaspur. Many artisans, scholars and businessmen from other parts of India settled in Arki during his reign, as he provided them with tax-free land free of cost.

The Rana was a patron of arts and had muralled interiors installed in the Arki Fort in 1850. These murals are prime attractions among tourists today.

The last ruler of Baghal was Shri Raja Rajendra Singh (1928–2010) who overhauled the administration and introduced radical constitutional reforms. After Indian independence, he was an M.L.A., 1st Commandant General of Home Guards, Director of Civil Defence. During the Indian Rebellion of 1857, Rana Kishan Singh assisted the British forces, for which he was presented the title of Raja. Another revolt was suppressed in 1905 with the help of the superintendent of Shimla Hill States. This was as payback for the support he had received earlier to drive the Gurkhas out.

== Geography ==
Arki is located at 31.15°N 76.97°E. It has an average elevation of 1045 metres (3428 feet).

Arki is located in the Siwalik range of Himalaya mountains. Due to its high altitude, Arki enjoys pleasant weather in the summers, with the temperatures hovering between 26 °C and 32 °C. The winters are chilly and the temperature ranges between 4 °C and 8 °C. The rainfall is moderate and occurs mainly during July and August.

Arki is known for its caves and cave temples, among which Lutru Mahadev and Mutru Mahadev are very famous.

== Sair Fair ==
The Sair Fair is an annual two-day event held at Arki on sakranti of Ashwin (16/17 September). The fair was famous for buffalo fights. Local people used to train their buffaloes for the event but the event has not taken place since 2015. The fair is attended by millions of people every year. Night programs in this fair are always different and people of Arki enjoy the day a lot.

== Demographics ==
As of 2011 India census, Arki had a population of 3040. Males constitute 50.52% of the population and females 49.48%. Arki has an average literacy rate of 94%, higher than the national average of 74.04% (census 2011). 13% of the population is under 6 years of age.

== Places of interest ==
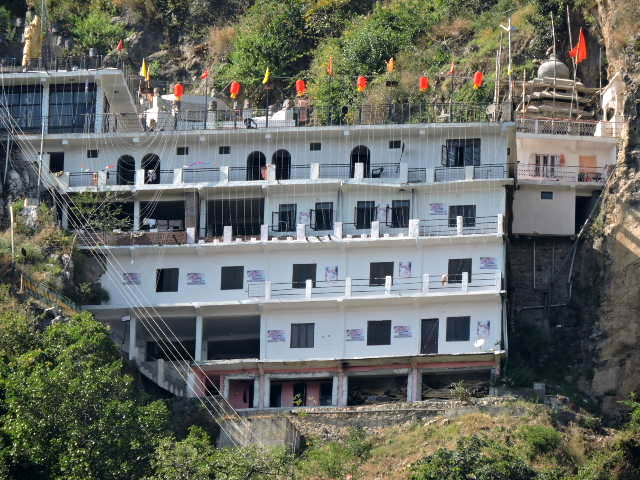
Lutru Mahadev temple, Arki, Himachal Pradesh, India

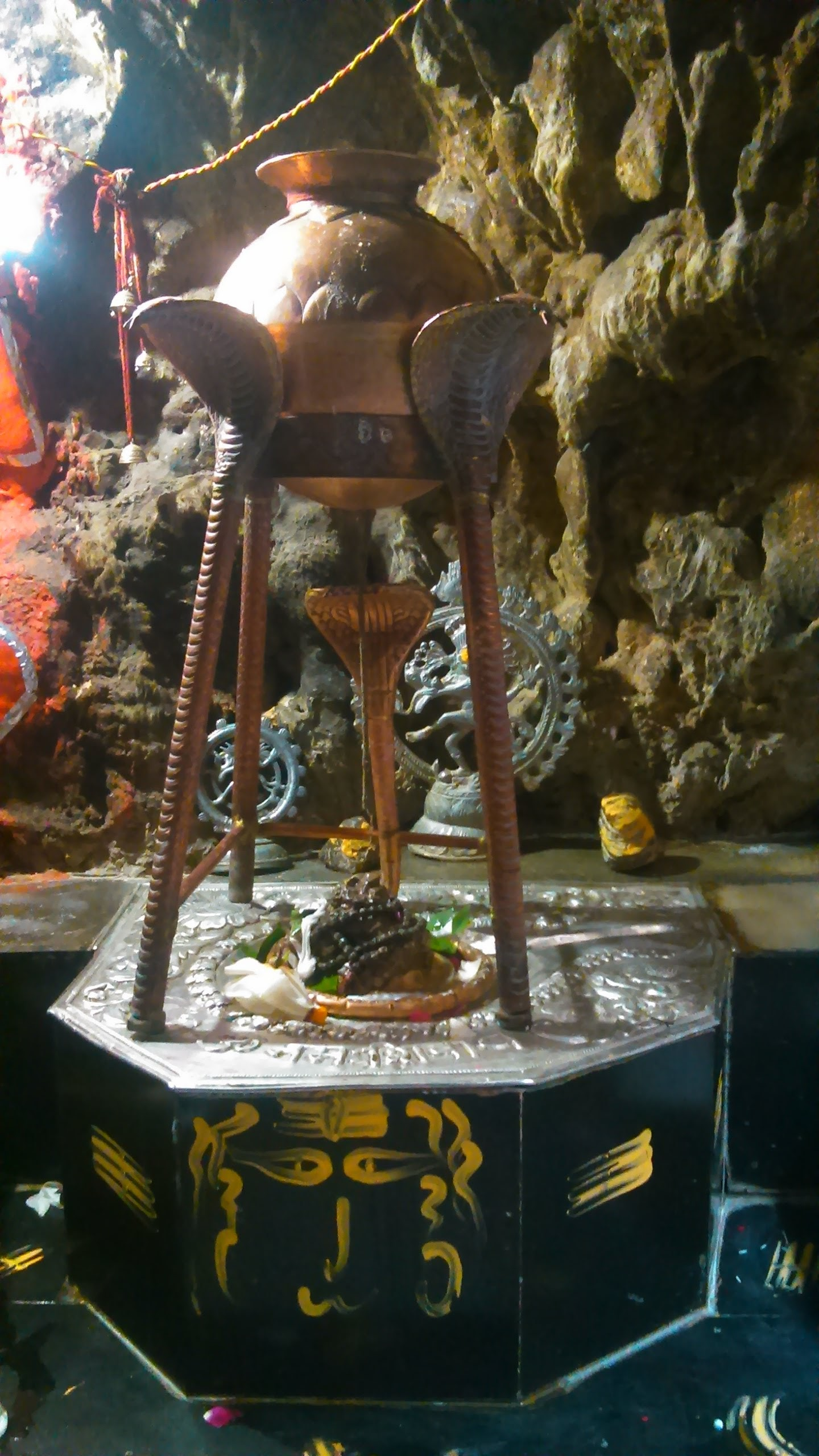
Shivling at Lutroo Mahadev Cave Temple at Arki

- Lutru Mahadev Temple was built in 1621 by the king of Baghal. Shiva appeared in his dream and ordered him to make his temple. There is a Shivaling here. It is situated at the top as the crown of Arki. The Shivratri at Lutru Mahadev Temple is also very popular.
- Jakholi Devi Temple (Badhra Kali Temple) was built by the king of Baghal for Bhadra Kali, around 1650. This temple is 7 km from Arki.
- Dhundan is known for its scenery and temples. It is also famous for its Guru Matth and Cheenj.
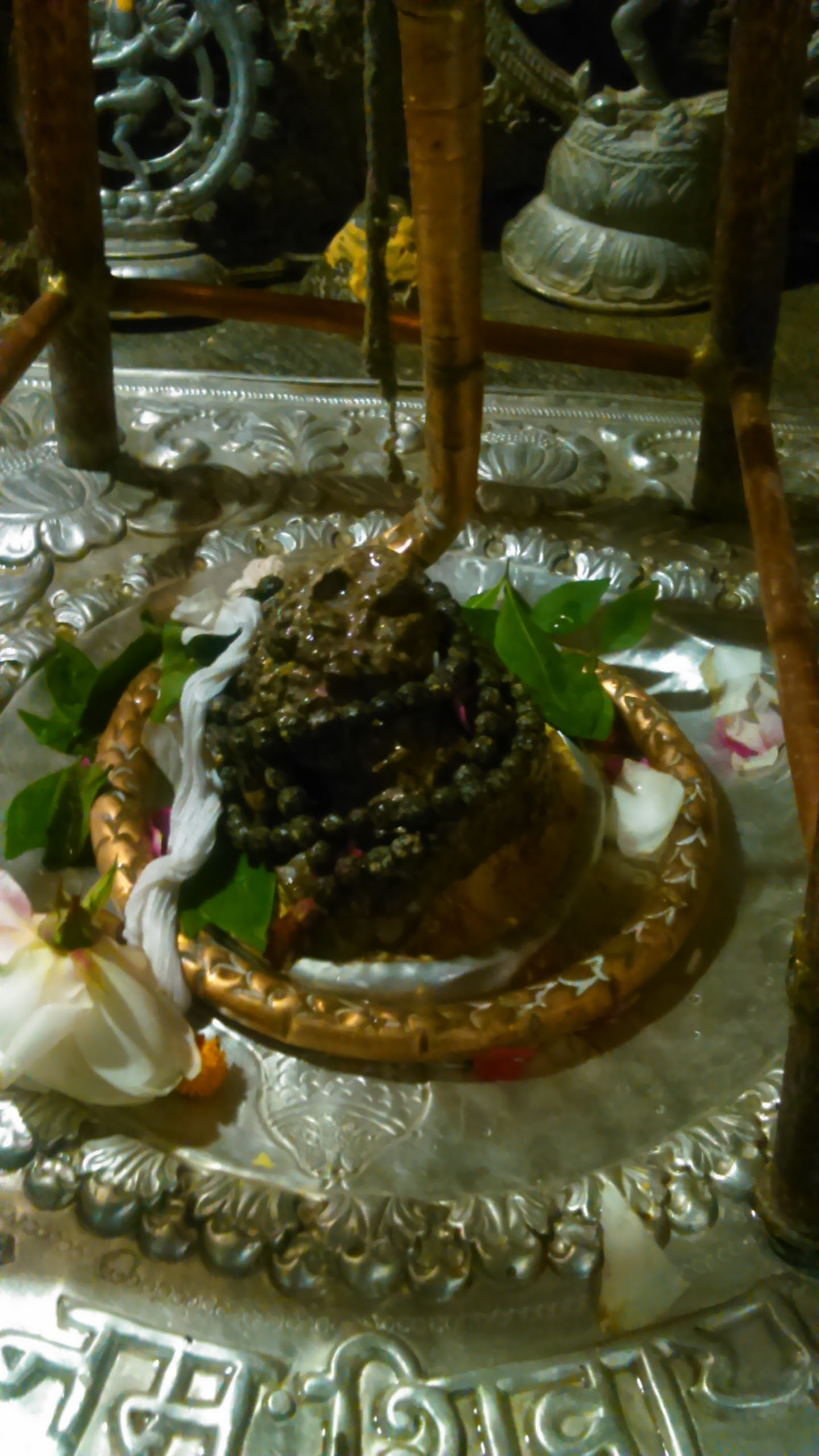
- Bakhalag is a small village around 9 km from Arki, known for its scenery.
- Baniya Devi is a place in dense forest where a temple dedicated to Goddess Van Durga has been present since ancient times.
- The only private hospital in Arki is K. Vardaan Health Care Centre, run by Dr. Vimal Pankaj Katoch, ex. EMO Ajit Neuro hospital Amritsar.
- Arki Fort was built between 1695 and 1700 by Rana Prithvi Singh and is in the town.
- Mutru Mahaved Temple is a temple in the town.
- The four temples on the sides of the village have been said to save it from any difficult situation from nature. These are Lutru Mahadev Temple, Kali Mata Temple, Devdhar Temple and Shakni Temple.
- "Shiv Guffa" Kunihar
- The Temple of "Dev Dhar Wala" Isht Dev Of Baghal State At "Sairi Ghat"is where the fair is held in "Jaieshth month" (May) every year.
- Chamyawal Village is a place of waterfalls, 4 km away from Arki. The renowned Durga Mata temple is located here. Several cricket tournaments are held here.
- Manjhu Khad is known for its views.
- Batal Village is the most populated village of tehsil Arki and is 4 km away from Arki.
- Darlaghat is an industrial area, known for Ambuja factory, 'Truckon aur Traalo ka Sehar'
- Kooni Khad is 9 KM away from Arki.
- Batal Collegei is a college 4KM away from Arki, which about 1500 students attend every year.
- Antique "Dhuni" in Aslu village.

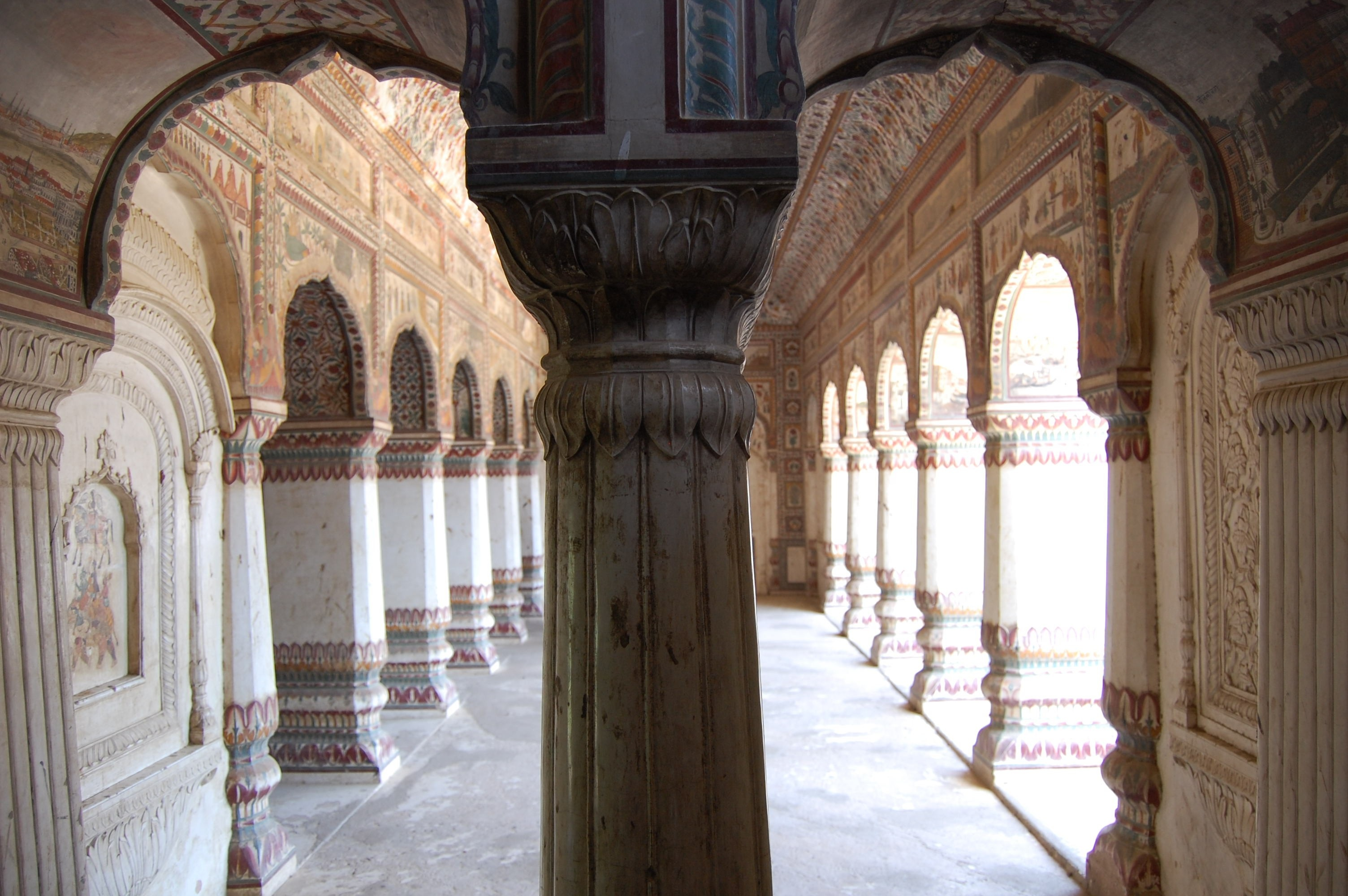
Arki fort

== Gallery ==
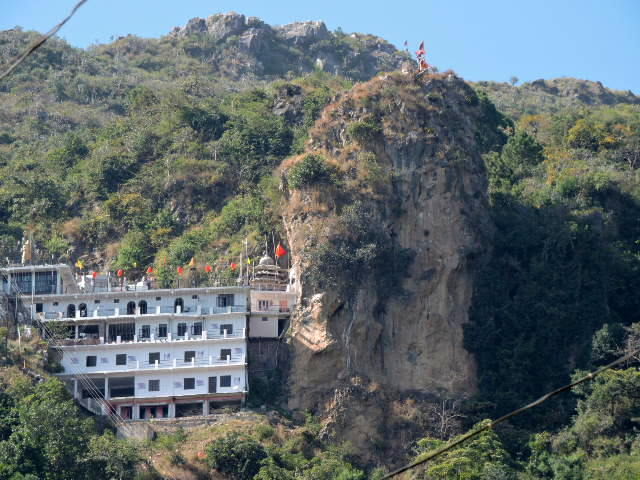
Lutru Mahadev temple, Arki

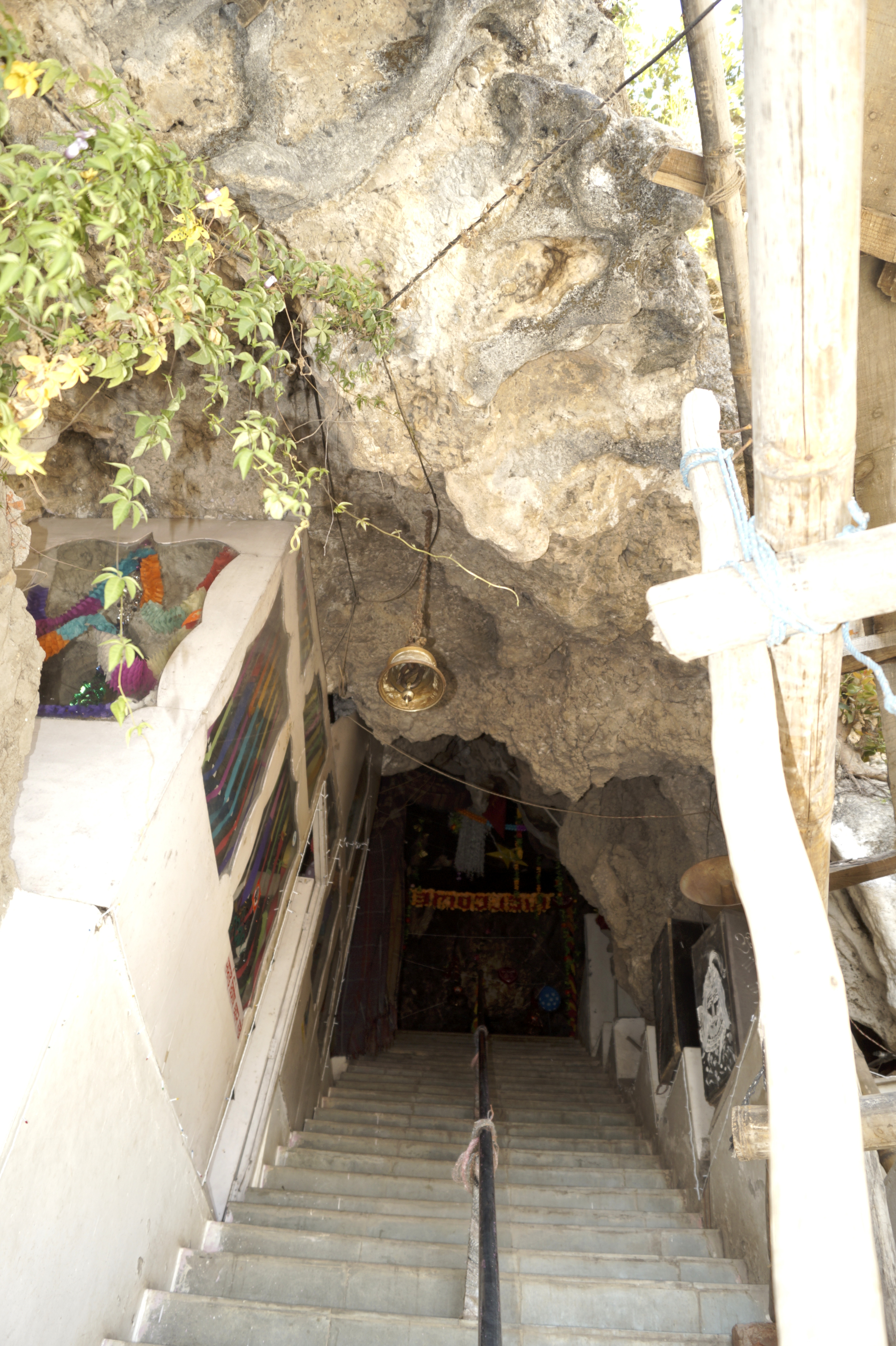
Lutru Mahadev cave temple, Arki, Himachal Pradesh, India
