= 1841 in India =

- Centuries: 17th; 18th; 19th; 20th; 21st
- Decades: 1820s; 1830s; 1840s; 1850s; 1860s
- See also: List of years in India; Timeline of Indian history

Events in the year 1841 in India.

== Incumbents ==
- The Earl of Auckland, Governor-General, 1836–42.
- Nicol Alexander Dalzell, assistant commissioner of customs in Bombay

== Events ==
- Sino-Sikh War, May 1841 to August 1842, General Zorawar Singh Kahluria of the Sikh Empire invaded Qing Tibet
- First Anglo-Afghan War, 1837-1842
- Missionaries from the Presbyterian Church of Wales found the Presbyterian Church in India in the Khasi Hills in northeast India
- Johann Christian Freidrich Heyer, Lutheran minister in America, becomes the first Lutheran Missionary from America to visit India
- 52nd Regiment of Foot comes to India from Australia
- Loreto Sisters come to India and build schools
- British India Society begins publishing British Indian Advocate

== Law ==
- Succession (Property Protection) Act

== Births ==
- Frederick William Spring, British Army officer and military historian
- Nawab Waqar-ul-Mulk Kamboh, one of the founders of the All India Muslim League

== Deaths ==
- Zorawar Singh Kahluria, the "Napoleon of India," who invaded Tibet in the Sino-Sikh War
- Ranchhodji Diwan, chief minister of Junagadh state
- Prithvi Singh Deo, raja of Sonepur State
- Nahar Singh, raja of Sailana State
