= Laila Samad =

- লায়লা সামাদ
- Born: 3 April 1928; Kolkata, Bengal Presidency, British India
- Died: 10 August 1989 (aged 61); Dhaka, Bangladesh
- Education: Lady Brabourne College; University of Calcutta
- Occupations: Journalist, writer, actress
- Spouses: Mirza Abdus Samad
- Father: Khan Bahadur Aminul Haque

Laila Samad (3 April 1928 – 10 August 1989) was a Bangladeshi journalist, writer and actress. She was awarded Bangla Academy Literary Award in 1981 by the government of Bangladesh.

== Background and education ==
Laila Samad was born on 3 April 1928 in Kolkata, West Bengal, British India to Khan Bahadur Aminul Haque. Haque was a government official of British Raj, and a friend and a former Aligarh Muslim University classmate of G. A. K. Lohani. Samad first studied in Sakhawat Memorial School and Nari Shikshika Mandir. She then went to Lady Brabourne College and Ashutosh College. She earned her M.A. in journalism from the University of Calcutta in 1959.

== Career ==
In 1950, Samad joined the magazine Begum. She worked from 1951 to 1954 at The Sangbad. From 1954 to 1958, she worked at the Anannya Magazine. In 1970 she worked in the Bichitra magazine. She also acted in stage dramas and directed them in the 1950s.

== Personal life and death ==
Samad married her cousin, Mirza Abdus Samad, in 1946. She died on 10 August 1989 in Dhaka, Bangladesh. Dhaka Ladies Club created the "Laila Samad Award" in her memory.
