= 1835 in India =

- Centuries: 17th; 18th; 19th; 20th; 21st
- Decades: 1810s; 1820s; 1830s; 1840s; 1850s
- See also: List of years in India; Timeline of Indian history

Events in the year 1835 in India.

== Incumbents ==
- Governor-General: Sir Charles Metcalfe.

== Events ==
- 28 January – Medical College, Bengal is established; later became Medical College Kolkata.
- 2 February – Madras Medical College is established.
- Aasam Rifle
- First British Indian Rupee

== Law ==
- English Education Act

== Births ==
- 13 February – Mirza Ghulam Ahmad, Founder of the Ahmadiyya Muslim Community (died 1908).
- 28 September – Sai Baba of Shirdi, guru, yogi and fakir (died 1918).

== Deaths ==
- 22 March – William Fraser, Agent to the Governor-General at Delhi (born 1784).
- 17 July – Tirot Sing, Khasi chief and leader of the Anglo-Khasi resistance (born c.1802).
