= 1843 in India =

- Centuries: 17th; 18th; 19th; 20th; 21st
- Decades: 1820s; 1830s; 1840s; 1850s; 1860s
- See also: List of years in India; Timeline of Indian history

Events in the year 1843 in India.

== Events ==
- Sind War.
- December – Gwalior campaign was fought between the United Kingdom and Marathan forces in Gwalior in India
- 1 July – Bank of Madras
- Howrah district
- November 1843 – Noble College, Machilipatnam

== Law ==
- 7 April – Indian Slavery Act, 1843 was passed.
- (Colonies) Evidence Act (British statute)
- Judicial Committee Act (British statute)

== Deaths ==
- November - Esther Leach, English-Indian actress
