= 1836 in India =

- Centuries: 17th; 18th; 19th; 20th; 21st
- Decades: 1810s; 1820s; 1830s; 1840s; 1850s
- See also: List of years in India; Timeline of Indian history

Events in the year 1836 in India.

== Incumbents ==
- Earl of Auckland, Governor-General, 1836–42.
