= Bankura Zilla School =

Coordinates: 23°14′14″N 87°3′44″E

Location
- Machantala, Bankura - 722101, West Bengal, India

Information
- Type: Governmental
- Established: 1840; 186 years ago
- Founder: Francis Goldsberry
- School board: West Bengal Board of Secondary Education, West Bengal Council of Higher Secondary Education
- Headmaster: krishnadhan Ghosh (TIC)
- Faculty: 40
- Enrollment: over 1300
- Language: Bengali
- Campus: Urban
- Affiliation: WBCHSE

Bankura Zilla School is one of the oldest educational institutions in the Bankura District of West Bengal, India. Established in 1840, the historic government-run boys' school is popularly known as Zilla School. The primary medium of instruction is Bengali, although English-medium option is offered for higher secondary students. Affiliated with the WBBSE and WBCHSE, the school provides education from grades 5 to 12, featuring Arts, Science, and Commerce stream at higher secondary level. It is situated on College Road, close to Bankura Christian college & school in Bankura city.

== History ==
Bankura Zilla School was established by Dr. G. N. Cheek, a civil surgeon and indigo planter, alongside Mr. Francis Goldsberry, the Bankura District Sessions Judge as the first English school of the district, Bankura Free School in the year 1840, which later renamed to Bankura Zilla School. The school started in 'Sepoy Barrack Hospital' building which was established in the year 1809. Nowadays this building is termed as 'hall' in the school. It was a hospital at that time and now used as the auditorium of the school.

It is converted to Zilla School in the year 1846 and renamed to zilla school. After being converted into govt school, eastern and western part of the main building were extended. The office room of the existing school was made with the financial assistance of Maharaja Mahatabchand Bahadur of Burdwan, the then king of Burdwan. He helped to build two great academic institutions of this region : Burdwan University and Bankura Zilla School, in 1851.

== Affiliation ==
This school is affiliated to West Bengal Board of Secondary Education and West Bengal Council of Higher Secondary Education.

== Notable alumni ==
- Khudiram Das: scholar and literary critic; an authority on Rabindra literature as well as Hindu vernacular traditions such as Mangalkavya, Vaishnava literature, and Santali literature
- Ranesh Das Gupta: writer, journalist, politician, revolutionary novelist, founder of Bangladesh Udichi Shilpigoshthi—the largest cultural organization in Bangladesh
- Radhika Prasad Goswamy: celebrated vocalist of the Bishnupur Gharana
- Mohammad Shamsuzzoha: former Professor and reader at University of Rajshahi. Sacrificed his life during the 1969 East Pakistan mass uprising.

== See also ==
- Purulia Zilla School
- Bishnupur High School (Bankura)
