= Manorama Basu =

Bengali revolutionary and feminist (1897–1986)

- মনোরমা বসু
- Born: 18 November 1897; Bakai, Barisal, British India
- Died: 16 October 1986 (aged 88); Bangladesh
- Other name: Masima (মাসীমা)
- Citizenship: British subject (1897-1947); Pakistan (1947-1971); Bangladesh (from 1971)
- Occupations: Political activist, social reformer
- Years active: 1911–1986
- Organization(s): Indian National Congress, Communist Party of India
- Known for: Feminism
- Political party: Communist Party of India
- Other political affiliations: Indian National Congress
- Spouse: Chintaharan Basu
- Awards: Begum Rokeya Padak

Manorama Basu (née Monorama Ray, 18 November 1897 – 16 October 1986), nicknamed Masima (maternal aunt), was a Bengali revolutionary and feminist from Bangladesh. Throughout her life, Basu played a prominent role in the popular movements of 1962, 1964, and the mass uprising of 1969. She was also a pioneer in the Bangladeshi liberation struggle.

== Biography ==
=== Early life ===
Manorama Basu was born as Manorama Ray, on 18 November 1897, in the village of Narottampur in the Banaripara Upazila of Barisal, which was then part of undivided Bengal under British rule (now in Bangladesh). She was the fifth child of Nilkantha Ray and Pramoda Sundari Ray, who were supporters of the anti-British movement. Manorama's early life was marked by poverty, and she did not have the opportunity to receive formal education due to her father's untimely death.

At the age of 14, Manorama was married to Chintaharan Basu, who was the zamindar (landlord) of the village of Bakai in Barisal. Despite the constraints of her landlord husband's family, Manorama Basu actively participated in the Indian independence movement while living in Barisal.

=== Involvement in the Independence Movement ===
In 1921–1922, Manorama Basu taught women in the villages how to spin the charkha (spinning wheel) and wear khadi (homespun cloth) as part of the "Charakha Dharo, Khaddar Paro" (Grasp the Charkha, Wear Khaddar) movement. Manorama Basu herself wore khaddar clothing throughout her life.

In 1925, when Mahatma Gandhi visited Barisal for political campaigning and fundraising, Manorama Basu actively participated in the swadeshi (self-reliance) movement and even donated her own jewelry. In the same year, after the death of Saroj Nalini Dutt, Manorama Basu established the Sarojnalini Mahila Samiti (Sarojnalini Women's Organization) in Barisal, which was one of the first women's organizations in what is now Bangladesh, to safeguard women's rights.

Manorama Basu joined the Indian National Congress in the early 1930s and became a Congress worker. In 1932, she was one of the first three women who courted arrest in the civil disobedience movement, and she had the opportunity to interact with Chittaranjan Das's sister, Urmila Devi, and Jyotirmoyee Devi in the Behrampur jail.

=== Communist affiliation and activism ===
In the early 1940s, Manorama Basu joined the Communist Party of India. She was a leader of the Barisal branch of the Women's Self-Defense Society. During the Bengal famine of 1943, she was actively involved in relief work, including setting up soup kitchens, hospitals, and rescue shelters.

After the partition of India in 1947, Manorama Basu led a movement to supply food in Barisal, for which she was imprisoned for a year. She was later imprisoned for another three years under the Public Safety Act until her release in 1952.

In 1954, the growing political instability and unrest in East Pakistan (present-day Bangladesh) compelled Manorama Basu to go into temporary hiding. However, when the situation became more conducive, she resurfaced and dedicated herself to the work of the Matrimandir Ashram, which she had established earlier. Recognizing the importance of ensuring the long-term sustenance of the Ashram's activities, Manorama Basu deciced to bequeath all of her personal property to the institution.

=== Role in popular movements ===
Manorama Basu played a crucial role in the popular movements that swept across East Pakistan (now Bangladesh) in the 1960s. She was at the forefront of the mass demonstrations and uprisings in 1962, 1964, and the pivotal revolt of 1969, which helped pave the way for the independence of Bangladesh.

=== Other contributions ===
In addition to her political activism, Manorama Basu was actively involved in social welfare activities. She established the Pallikalyan Amrta Pathagar (model primary school) and a playhouse for children in Barisal.

=== Later life and legacy ===
Manorama Basu was ailing from various ailments since 1983. She died on 16 October 1986, at the Matrimandir Ashram she had established in Kauniya, Barisal. She was the mother of four daughters and one son.

After her death, Manorama Basu's entire property was used to establish the "Manorama Basu Masima Memorial Trust" in 2001. The Matrimandir Ashram she had founded was later converted into a government primary school in Barisal.

Manorama Basu's contributions to the women's rights movement, the independence struggle, and the establishment of various social welfare institutions have been recognized with several posthumous awards, including the Sher-e-Bangla Medal in 1997 and the Begum Rokeya Padak by the Government of Bangladesh in 1999.

In 1971, the renowned writer and journalist Satyen Sen wrote the book "Manorama Masima" on the life and work of Manorama Basu.

== Bibliography ==
- সমবারু চন্দ্র মহন্ত (2012). "বসু, মনোরমা মাসীমা". In Sirajul Islam; Miah, Sajahan; Khanam, Mahfuza; Ahmed, Sabbir (eds.). Banglapedia: the National Encyclopedia of Bangladesh (Online ed.). Dhaka, Bangladesh: Banglapedia Trust, Asiatic Society of Bangladesh. ISBN 984-32-0576-6. OCLC 52727562. OL 30677644M.
