= 1834 in India =

- Centuries: 17th; 18th; 19th; 20th; 21st
- Decades: 1810s; 1820s; 1830s; 1840s; 1850s
- See also: List of years in India; Timeline of Indian history

Events in the year 1834 in India.

== Incumbents ==
- Governor-General of India: Lord William Bentinck

== Events ==
- 25 January – The Agreement Regarding Compensation for the Kubo (Kabaw) Valley is signed.
- Battle of Somwarpet
- Coorg War
