= Mezoma =

- Village
- Location of Peducha Mezoma (India)
- Coordinates: 25.6739°N 94.0173°E
- Country: India
- State: Nagaland
- District: Kohima

Population (2011)
  - Total: 2,177

Languages
  - Official: English
- Time zone: UTC+5:30 (IST)
- Vehicle registration: NL-01
- Sex ratio: 979 ♂/♀

Mezoma is a village in Kohima district of Nagaland state of India. The village is located about eighteen kilometres (11 mi) from the state capital, Kohima.
