= Santosh Gupta (journalist) =

- সন্তোষ গুপ্ত
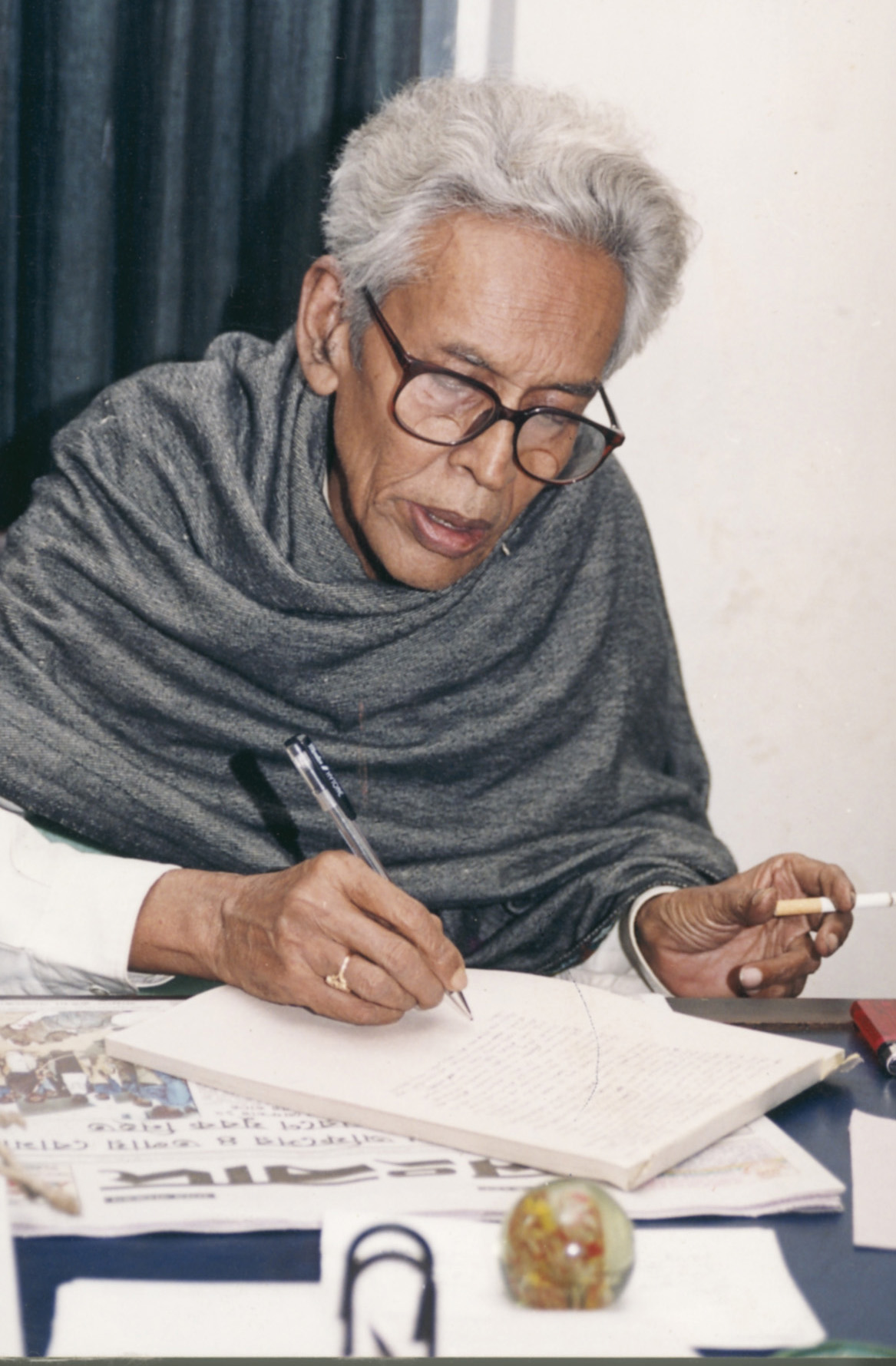
- Santosh Gupta
- Born: 9 January 1925; Runsi Village, Jhalokati District, Bengal Presidency, British India
- Died: 6 August 2004 (aged 79)
- Other names: Aniruddha
- Occupations: Journalist, writer

Santosh Gupta (9 January 1925 – 6 August 2004) was a Bangladeshi journalist and writer. He was awarded Ekushey Padak in 1997 and Independence Day Award in 2015 by the Government of Bangladesh. He wrote sometimes under the pen name Aniruddha.

== Career ==
Gupta started his career as journalist in 1957. Later he served as the senior assistant editor of The Sangbad. He wrote 18 books and edited some 30 books.

== Awards ==
- Ekushey Padak
- Independence Day Award
- Sher-e-Bangla Padak
- Maulana Tarkabagish Padak
- Jahur Hossain Memorial Padak
