= Bangladesh Udichi Shilpigoshthi =

Ekushey Padak recipient institution

- বাংলাদেশ উদীচী শিল্পীগোষ্ঠী
- Formation: 29 Oct 1968; 57 years ago
- Founder: Satyen Sen; Ranesh Das Gupta
- Type: Cultural
- Registration no.: S-9478
- Headquarters: 14/2 Topkhana Road, Dhaka
- Fields: Music, Drama, Dance, Recitation, Painting and literature
- Official language: Bangla, English
- General Secretary: Omit Ronjon De
- Vice President: Shivani Bhattacharya
- Website: udichi.org.bd

Bangladesh Udichi Shilpigoshthi (Bengali: বাংলাদেশ উদীচী শিল্পীগোষ্ঠী) is the largest cultural organisation in Bangladesh. The organisation's goal is the struggle to build what it deems a just, free, and equal society.

== History ==
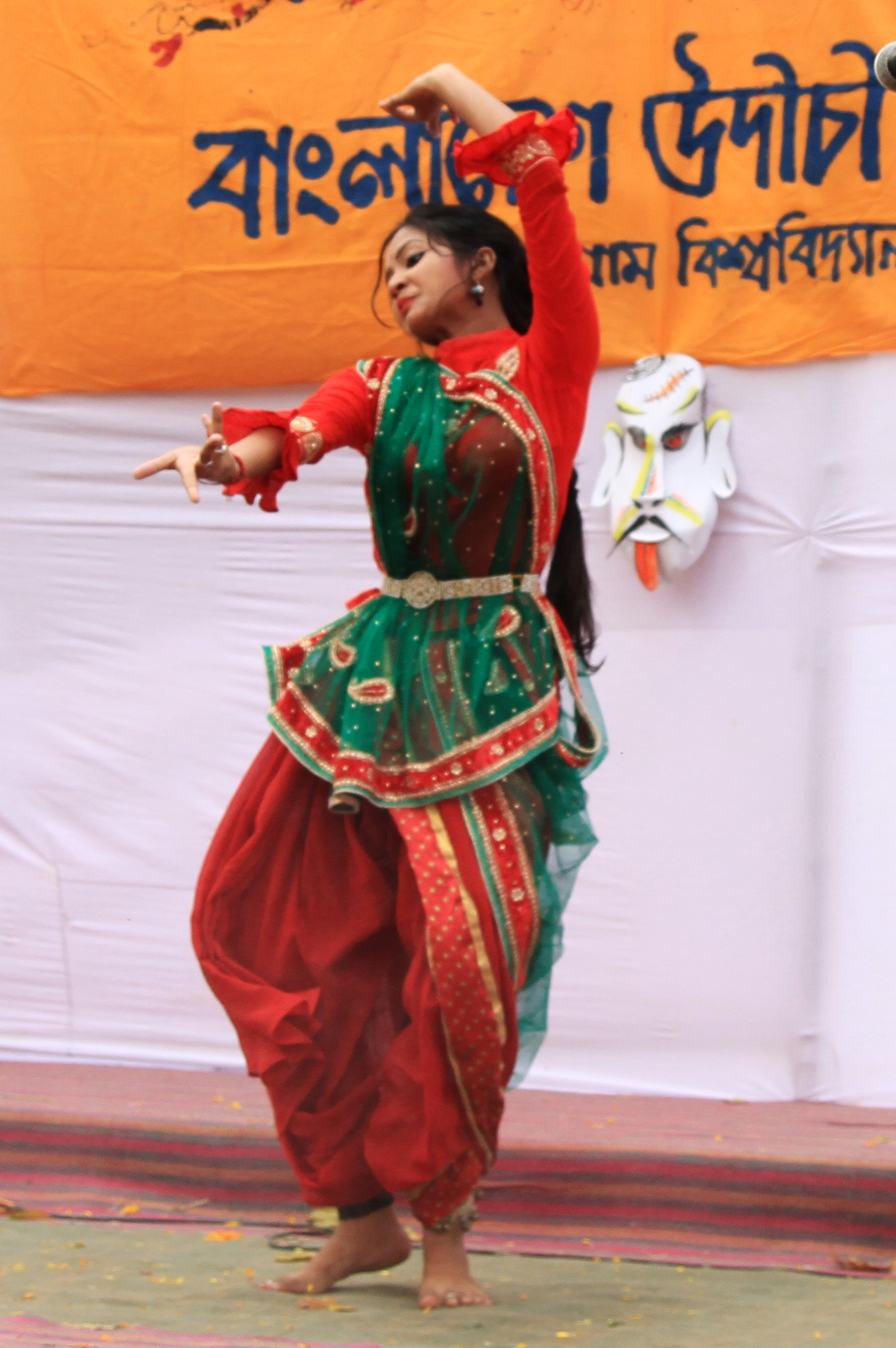
An activist of Udichi dancing to celebrate Pohela Falgun at Muktamanch of Chittagong University, 2015

Bangladesh Udichi Shilpigoshthi was organised in East Pakistan by revolutionary novelists Satyen Sen, Ranesh Das Gupta along with numerous youths in 1968, and through 1971 it operated a cultural campaign. At the opening of the Bangladesh Liberation War, its members fought for independence.

The 1999 Jessore bombings by Harkat-ul-Jihad-al-Islami Bangladesh, in which 2 time bombs killed 10 people and injured another 150, was a terrorist attack on Bangladesh Udichi Shilpigoshthi (see list of massacres in Bangladesh.

In 2013, the Bangladesh Udichi Shilpigoshthi was awarded the Ekushey Padak, the country's most prestigious award.

On the evening of 19 December 2025, a group of people attacked the office of Bangladesh Udichi Shilpigoshthi and set it on fire.
