= William Francis Thompson (philologist) =

William Francis Thompson (1810–1842) was a British India civil servant, magistrate and philologist who was born in London, England, and died in Ghazipur, India.

== Biography ==
Thompson attended the Haileybury and Imperial Service College before joining the Bengal Civil Service. He was first appointed as an assistant magistrate in Bareilly, and later served in Bundelkhand, Delhi and Hissar. Taking medical leave in Australia in 1835, he subsequently returned to India where he died in 1842.

Thompson is known for his translation of the Akhlāq-i Jalālī, published in 1839 under the title Practical Philosophy of the Muhammadan People. He was also a poet and published India: A Poem, in Three Cantos, a work critical of British rule in India.
