= The Sangbad =

Bengali language daily newspaper from Dhaka

Daily Sangbad
- 10-09-2023 cover of The Sangbad.
- Type: Daily newspaper
- Founder(s): Giasuddin Ahmed
- Founded: 17 May 1951
- Language: Bengali
- Headquarters: 36 Purana Paltan, Dhaka 1000
- City: Dhaka
- Country: Bangladesh
- Website: https://sangbad.net.bd/

The Sangbad (Bengali: সংবাদ) is a Bengali-language daily newspaper, founded in 1951 and published from Dhaka, Bangladesh. It is the oldest newspaper in Bangladesh.

== History ==
The Sangbad was founded in 1951 and published from Dhaka, Bangladesh. Its first owner was Nasiruddin Ahmad and its first editor was Khairul Kabir. During the 1950s and 1960s, the newspaper expressed strong views opposed to the Ayub Khan government of Pakistan, and was accordingly repressed. Its offices and printing pressed were burned during the crackdown in March 1971, and it remained closed during the entire Bangladesh Liberation War.

On 31 October 2017, a journalist of the Sangbad was arrested under the Information and Communication Technology (ICT) Act. He had shown people screenshots of fake photos of the President and Prime Minister on his phone.

Bazlur Rahman was a editor of the newspaper. In November 2020, the acting editor of the newspaper, Khandaker Muniruzzaman, died after catching COVID-19 during the COVID-19 pandemic in Bangladesh.

== Notable writers ==
The paper has been a fertile ground for radical thought and Bengali-language literature. It was the first Bengali newspaper to have a women's section. Notable contributors include:

- Bazlur Rahman
- Santosh Gupta
- Zahur Hossain Chowdhury
- Satyen Sen
- Mohammad Farhad
- Laila Samad
- Kamal Lohani
