= Satyen Sen =

Bengali revolutionary, writer, and cultural activist

- সত্যেন সেন
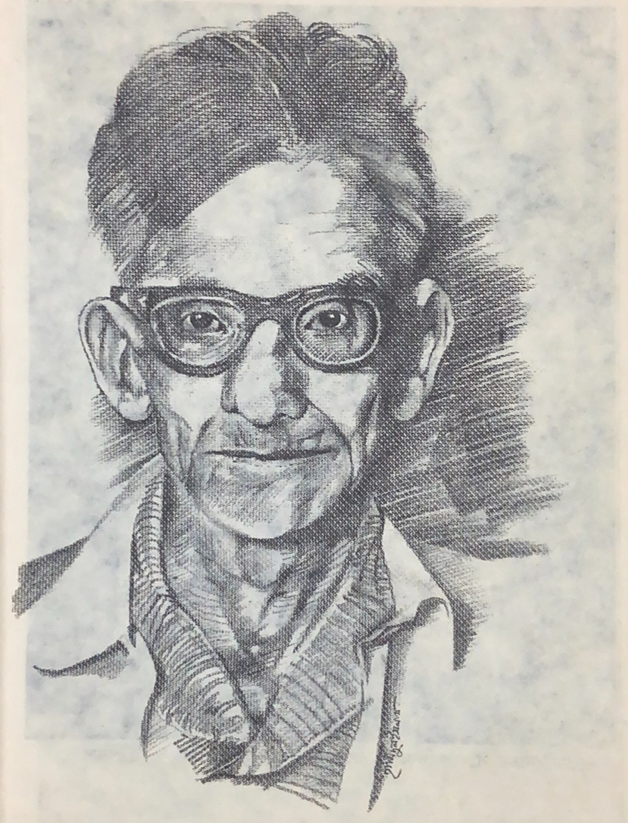
- Born: 28 March 1907; Tongibari, Bengal, British India
- Died: 5 January 1981 (aged 73); Shantiniketan, West Bengal, India
- Education: Master's degree
- Alma mater: Calcutta University
- Occupations: Novelist, journalist, historian and politician
- Known for: Founder of Bangladesh Udichi Shilpigoshthi
- Awards: Bangla Academy Literary Award; Ekushey Padak

Satyen Sen (Bengali: সত্যেন সেন; 28 March 1907 - 5 January 1981) was a Bengali revolutionary, writer, and cultural activist who played a vital role in the Indian independence movement and later in post-independence progressive movements. A member of Jugantar revolutionary organisation and later the Communist movement, he spent years in prison and embraced Marxism–Leninism. Sen was a founder of the cultural organisation Bangladesh Udichi Shilpigoshthi and a key figure in the Progressive Writers' Movement. He contributed significantly to literature, workers' mobilisation, and the Bangladesh Liberation War. His work reflected a lifelong commitment to justice, equality, and the upliftment of ordinary people through culture and activism.

== Early life ==
Satyen was born in Tangibari, Munshigonj. His father was Darinimohan Sen, and his cousin brother is Amartya Sen. He passed the entrance examination in 1924. He went to Kolkata and got involved in leftist movements. Later on he joined Jugantar. He then passed F.A. and B.A. exams. He started studying history at Calcutta University. He was arrested for his association with Jugantar several times in 1931, 1949, 1954, 1958 and 1965. He passed his M.A. while he was in jail.

== Works ==
He was influenced by Marxist ideology, and his ideology is reflected through his literary work. Apart from his political, socio-cultural activities and literary works, Sen also worked as an assistant editor of The Sangbad. He was also the founder of the cultural organisation Bangladesh Udichi Shilpigoshthi. As a novelist he is known mostly for his historical novels. He wrote twelve novels along with eight books on history and twenty books of other different categories. He started to write novels at a very late age.

== Selected works ==
=== Novels ===
- Bhorer Bihongi (The Bird of the Dawn, 1959)
- Obhishopto Nogori (The Cursed City, 1967)
- Paper Sontan (The Children of Sin, 1969)
- Ruddhodar Muktopran (The Door Closed, The Mind Open, 1973);
- Padochinho (The Footmarks, 1968)
- Seyana (The Shrewd, 1968)
- Kumarajiva (1969)
- Vidrohi Kaivarto (The Rebellious Kaivartos, 1969)
- Alberuni (1969)
- Sat Nombor Ward (Ward Number Seven, 1969)
- Bidrohi Kaibarta (1970)
- Uttoron (Reaching the Destination, 1970)
- E'Kul Bhange O Kul Gore (This Shore Erodes That Shore Rises, 1971)
- Ma (Mother, 1970)
- Oporajeo (The Unbeatable, 1970).

=== Biographies ===
- Manoroma Masima, biography of Manorama Basu.

== Awards ==
- Bangla Academy Literary Award (1970)
- Ekushey Padak (1986)
