= Palitana State =

Princely state of India

Coordinates: 21.52°N 71.83°E

- Princely State of British India
- 1194–1948
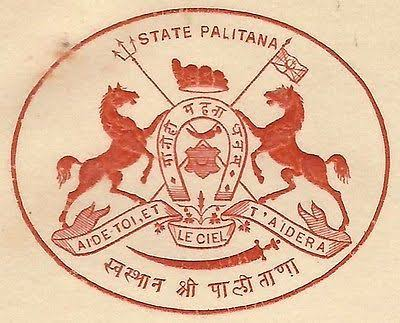
- Coat of arms

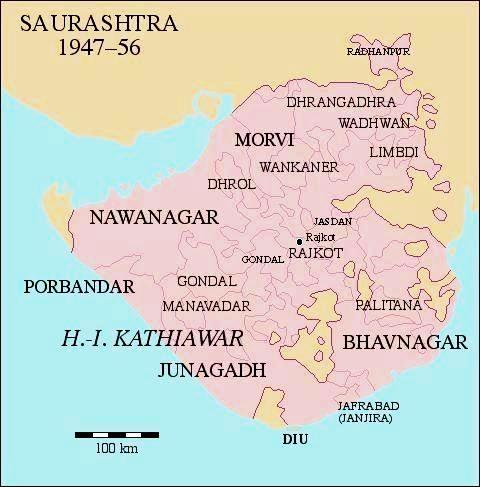
- Location of Palitana in Saurashtra
- Area
  - 1921: 777 km^{2} (300 sq mi)
- Population
  - 1921: 58,000
- History
  - Established: 1194
  - Indian independence: 1948
Succeeded by
India

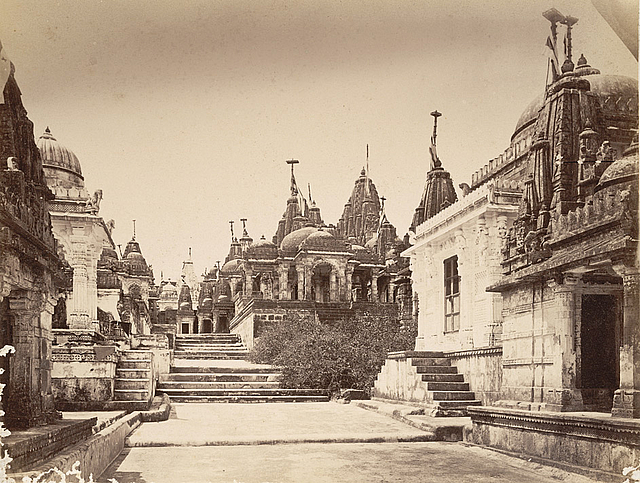
View of the Palitana Temples in 1860

Palitana was a princely state in British India until 1948. The capital was the city of Palitana. It ceased to exist when India became independent.

== History ==
Palitana was a princely state in British India. It formed a part of the Kathiawar Agency of the Bombay Presidency. Area, 289 sq. m.; pop. (1901), 52,856, showing a decrease of 15% in the decade. Gross revenue, £42,000; tribute jointly to the Gaekwar of Baroda and the Nawab of Junagadh, £700. The capital of the state, Palitana, had a population of 12,800. Its ruler enjoyed a 9-guns salute.

=== Rulers ===
The rulers bore the title of Thakur Sahib.

- 1697 - 1734 Prithvirajji Kandhaji
- 1734 - .... Nonghanji III
- .... - 1766 Sartanji II
- 1766 - 1770 Alubhai
- 1770 - 1820 Undaji
- 1820 - 1840 Kandhaji IV
- 1840 - 1860 Nonghanji IV
- 1860 Pratapsinghji
- 1 Jun 1860 - Nov 1885 Sursinhji
- 24 Nov 1885 – 29 Aug 1905 Mansinhji Sursinhji
- 29 Sep 1905 – 15 Aug 1947 Bahadursinhji Mansinhji

== See also ==
- Political integration of India
- Baroda, Western India and Gujarat States Agency
