= Gaya Prasad =

Indian politician

Gaya Prasad was the Chaube of Taraon State from 1812 to 1840.
