= Taraon State =

Coordinates: 24°59′N 80°57′E

Tarrauhan State
- Jagir
- 1812–1948
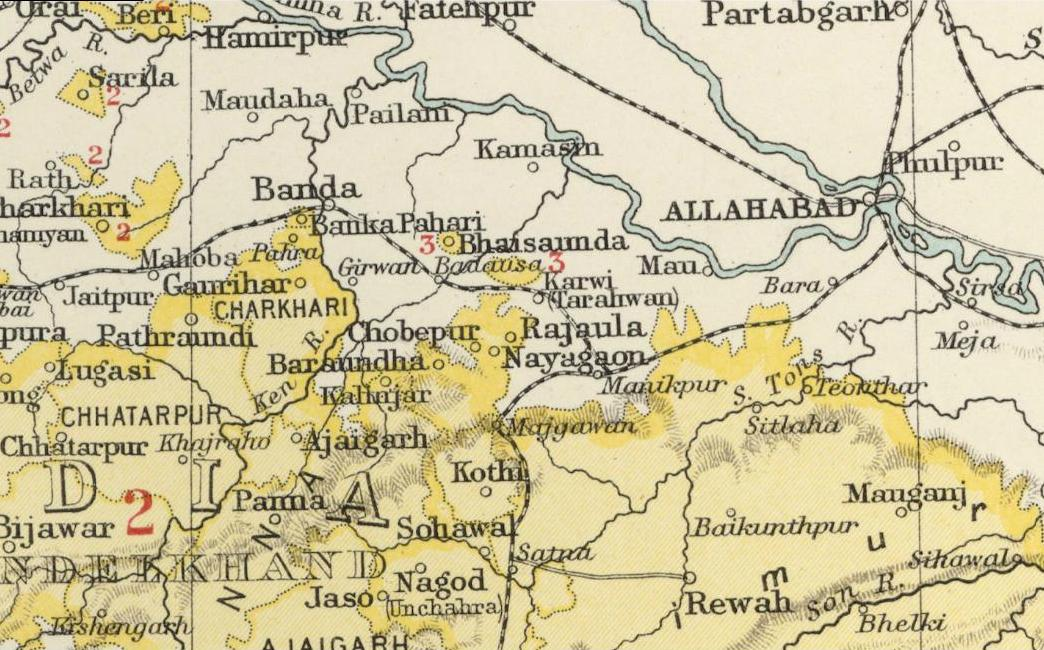
- Tarrauhan (Tarahwan) in the Imperial Gazetteer of India
- Area
  - 1901: 67.33 km^{2} (26.00 sq mi)
- Population
  - 1901: 3,178
- History
  - Established: 1812
  - Independence of India: 1948
Succeeded by
India
- Today part of: Uttar Pradesh, India

Taraon, also spelt Tarrauhan,Tarahwan, and Tarahuhān, was a jagir in India during the British Raj. It had an area of 67 square miles and its population was distributed in 13 villages. The capital of the state was in Pathraundi, located about 1.5 km from Karwi railway station of the Great Indian Peninsula Railway.

Tarrauhan Estate was merged into the Indian state of Vindhya Pradesh in 1948.

== History ==
Tarrauhan was founded in 1812 and was located in Tarrauhan Fort, which had been a former possession of the Rajas of Panna State. It was one of the Chaube Jagirs. In 1884, the Jagidar ceded land for the state jhansi manipur railway. It was under the Bundelkhand Agency of the Central India Agency until 1896 when it was transferred to the Baghelkhand Agency. In 1931 Tarrauhan was transferred back to the Bundelkhand Agency.

=== Rulers ===
Tarrauhan's rulers bore the title 'Chaube(choubey)'.

==== Chaubes ====
- 1812 – 1840 Gaya Prasad(also known as Gaya Parshad) (d. 1840)
- 1840 – 1856 Kamta Prasad (d. 1856)
- 1856 – 1872 Ram Chand (d. 3 March 1872)
- 3 March 1872 – 22 January 1881 Interregnum
- 1881 – 1895 Chhatarbhuj, granted ruling powers on 22 January 1881 (d. 1 January 1895)
- 1895 – 1925 Brij Gopal, declared insane in 1911; the state was administered on his behalf (d. 1925)
- 1925 – 1968 Ganga Prasad (b.1905, d. 3 January 1968)

== See also ==
- Bundelkhand Agency
- Political integration of India
