= Baghal State =

Coordinates: 31.15°N 76.97°E

Baghal State बाघल
- Princely State
- c. 1310-40–1948
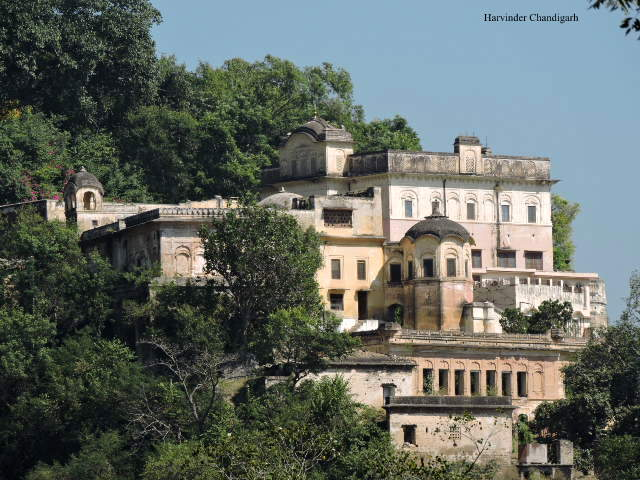
- Palace of Bhagal - Arki Princely State, Himachal Pradesh, India
- Capital: Arki
- Area
  - 1901: 312 km^{2} (120 sq mi)
- Population
  - 1901: 27,720
- History
  - Established: c. 1310-40
  - Independence of India: 1948
Succeeded by
India

Baghal State, also known as Arki State, was one of the Princely states of India during the period of the British Raj. It covers an area of 312 square kilometres (120 sq mi) and is now part of Arki Tehsil in Solan District of Himachal Pradesh state. Baghal was founded by Rana Aje De in 1310-40 and was acceded to India on 15 April 1948. The capital of Baghal - Arki.

== History ==
The state of Baghal was founded around 1640.

=== Rulers ===
The rulers of Baghal bore the title 'Raja' from 1860 onward.

==== Ranas ====
- 1670 - 1727 Prithvi Chand (d. 1727)
- 1727 - 1743 Mehar Chand (d. 1743)
- 1743 - 1778 Bhup Chand (d. 1778)
- 1778 - 1805 Jagat Singh (1st time) (d. 1828) (exiled in Nalagarh 1805 - 1815)
- 1805 - 1815 occupied by Nepal
- 3 Sep 1815 - Aug 1828 Jagat Singh (2nd time) (s.a.)
- 1828 - 16 Jan 1840 Shiv Saran Singh (b. 1793 - d. 1840)
- 1840 - 12 Mar 1875 Kishan Singh (b. 1817 - d. 1877) (personal style Raja from 1860)

==== Rajas ====
- 12 Mar 1875 – 23 Jul 1877 Kishan Singh (s.a.)
- 23 Jul 1877 – 12 Oct 1877 Moti Singh (d. 1877)
- 1877 - 1904 Dhian Singh (b. 1842 - d. 1904)
- 23 Apr 1904 - 3 Oct 1922 Bikram Singh (b. 1893 - d. 1922)
- 3 Oct 1922 – 21 Dec 1945 Surendra Singh (b. 1909 - d. 1945)
- 21 Dec 1945 – 15 Aug 1947 Rajendra Singh (b. 1928 - d. 2010)

== See also ==
- Kangra painting

== Gallery ==
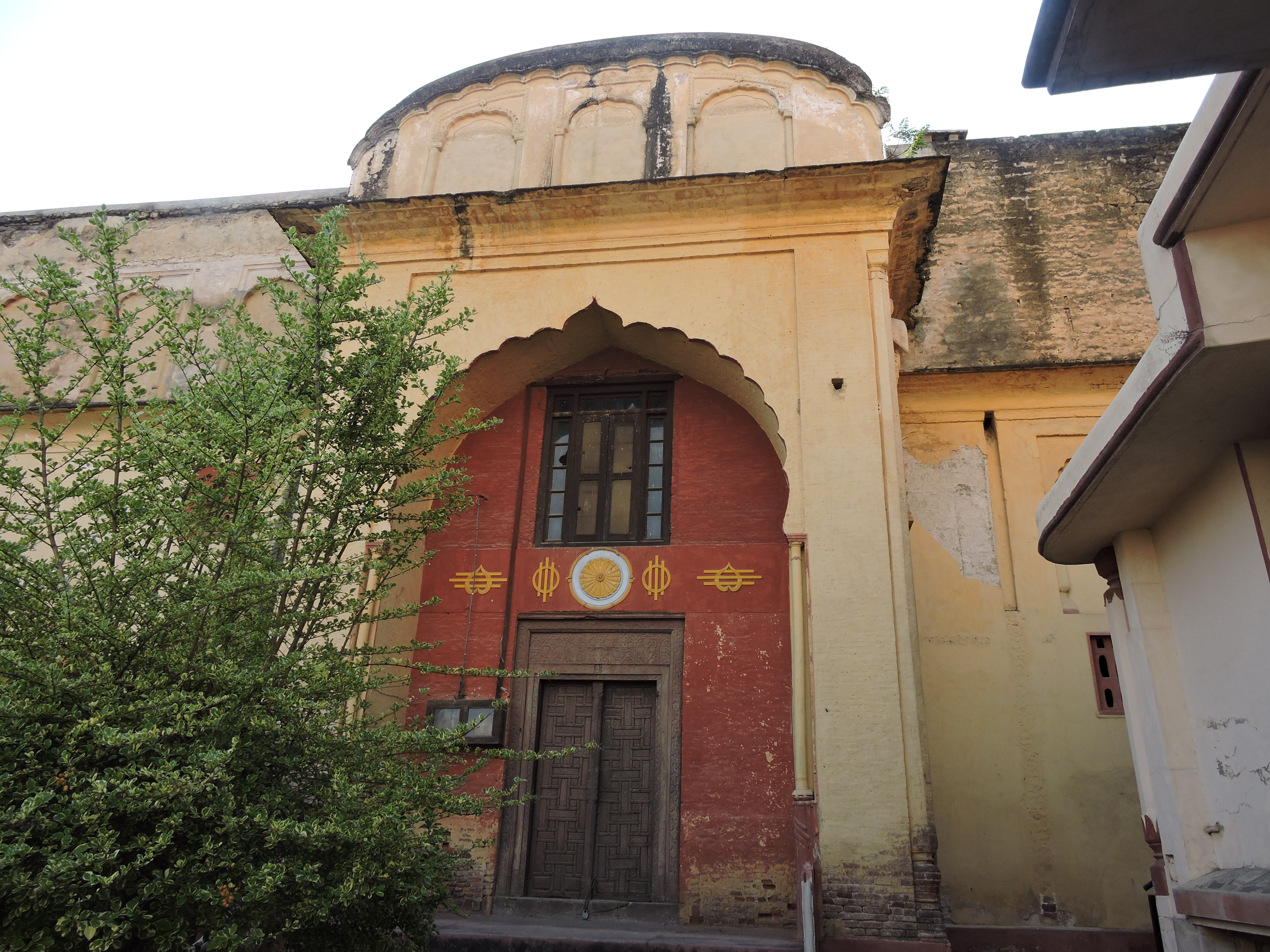
Arki Palace, Capital city of Baghal State

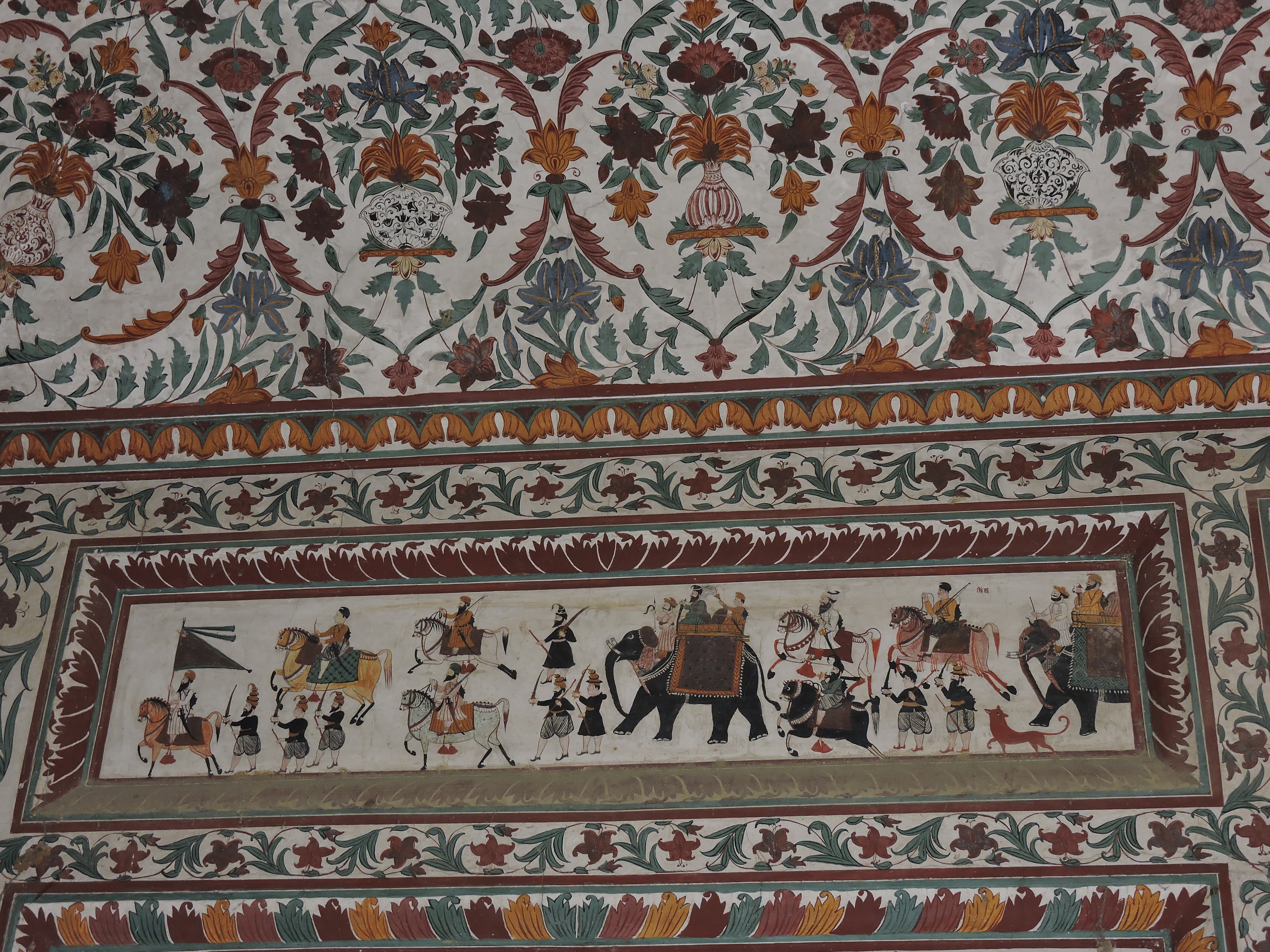
Interior designing in Arki Palace

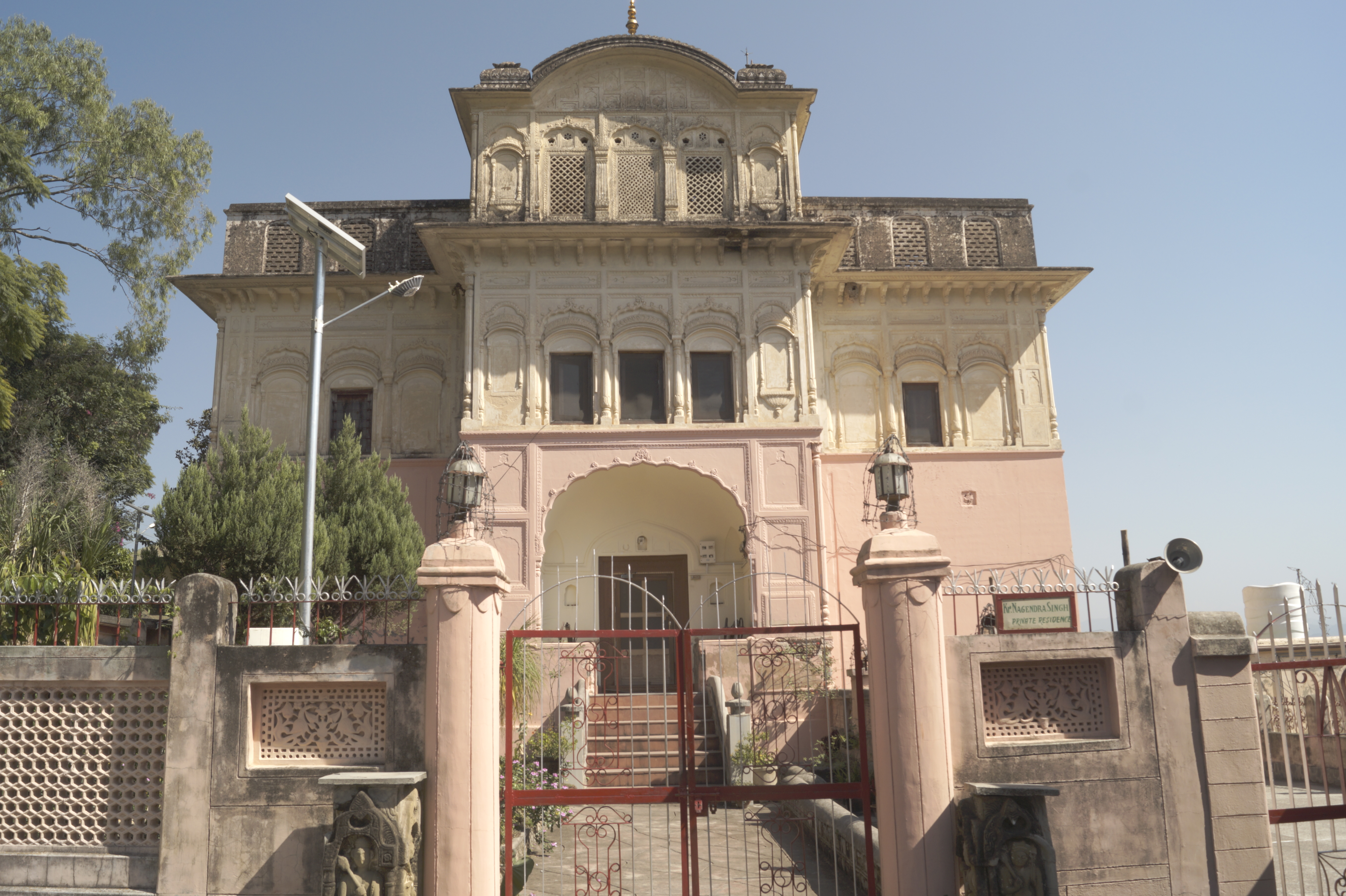
Part of Palace of Arki/Bhagal princely state, now residence of its legal heirs

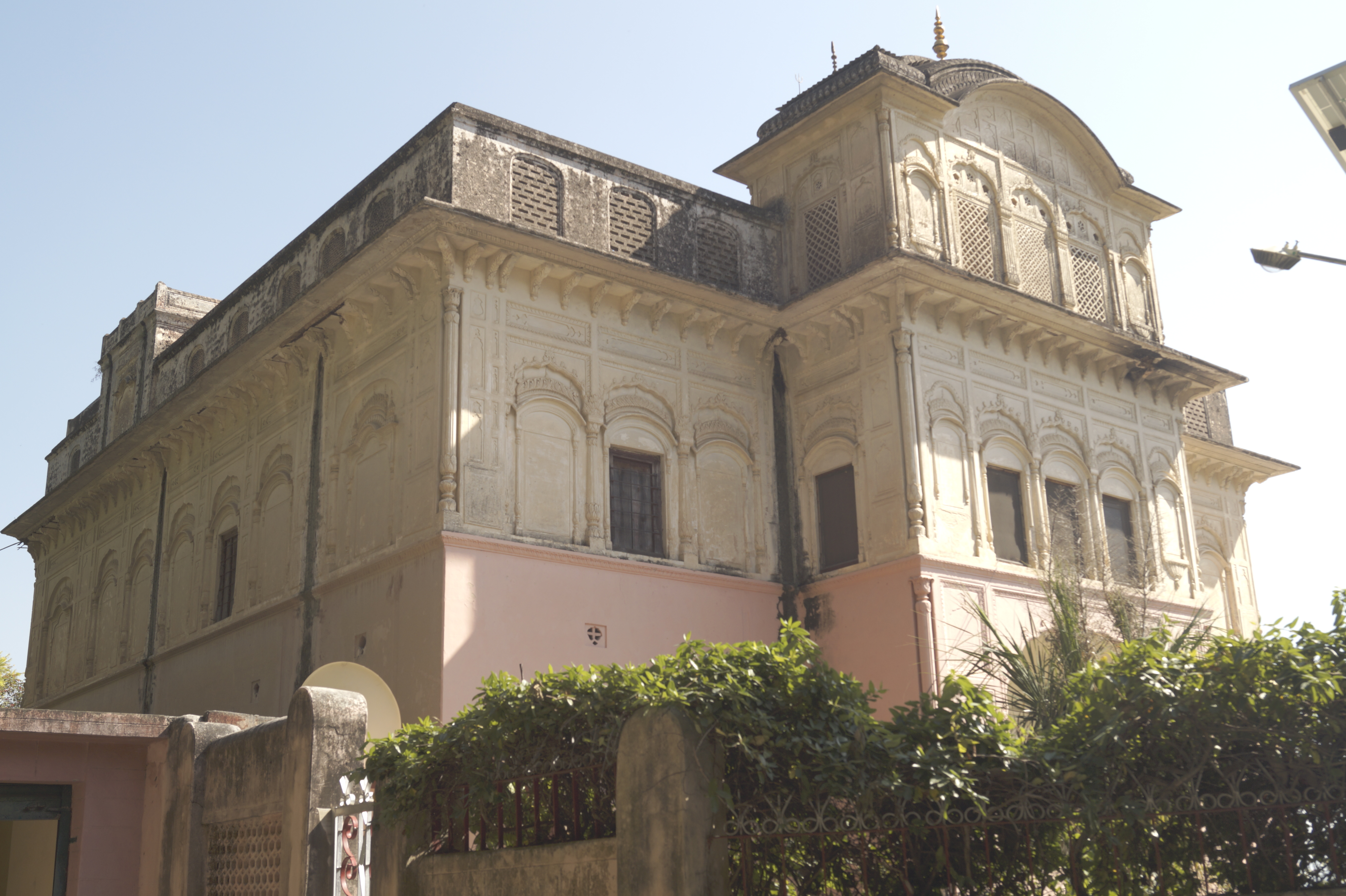
A side view of part of Palace of Arki/Bhagal Palace

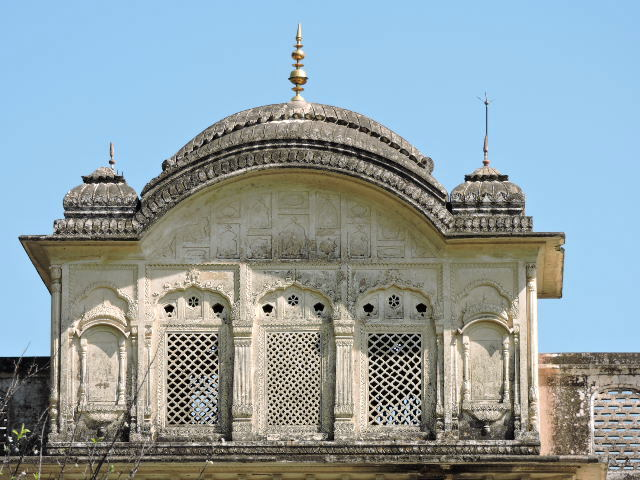
Design of top of palace of Arki/Bhagal Princely State

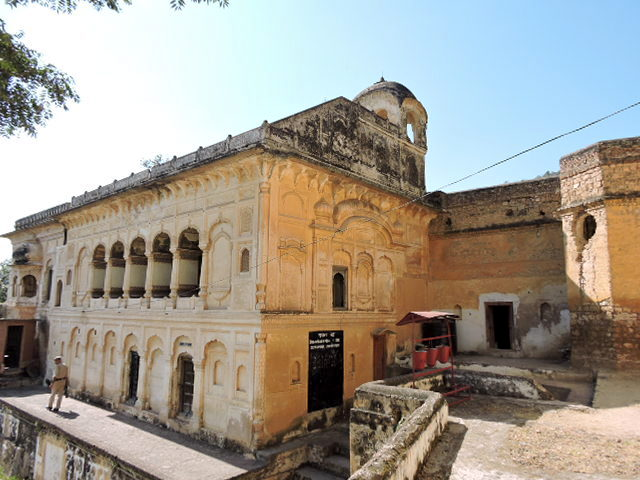
Diwan E Aam, general assembly hall, Arki/Bhagal Princely State

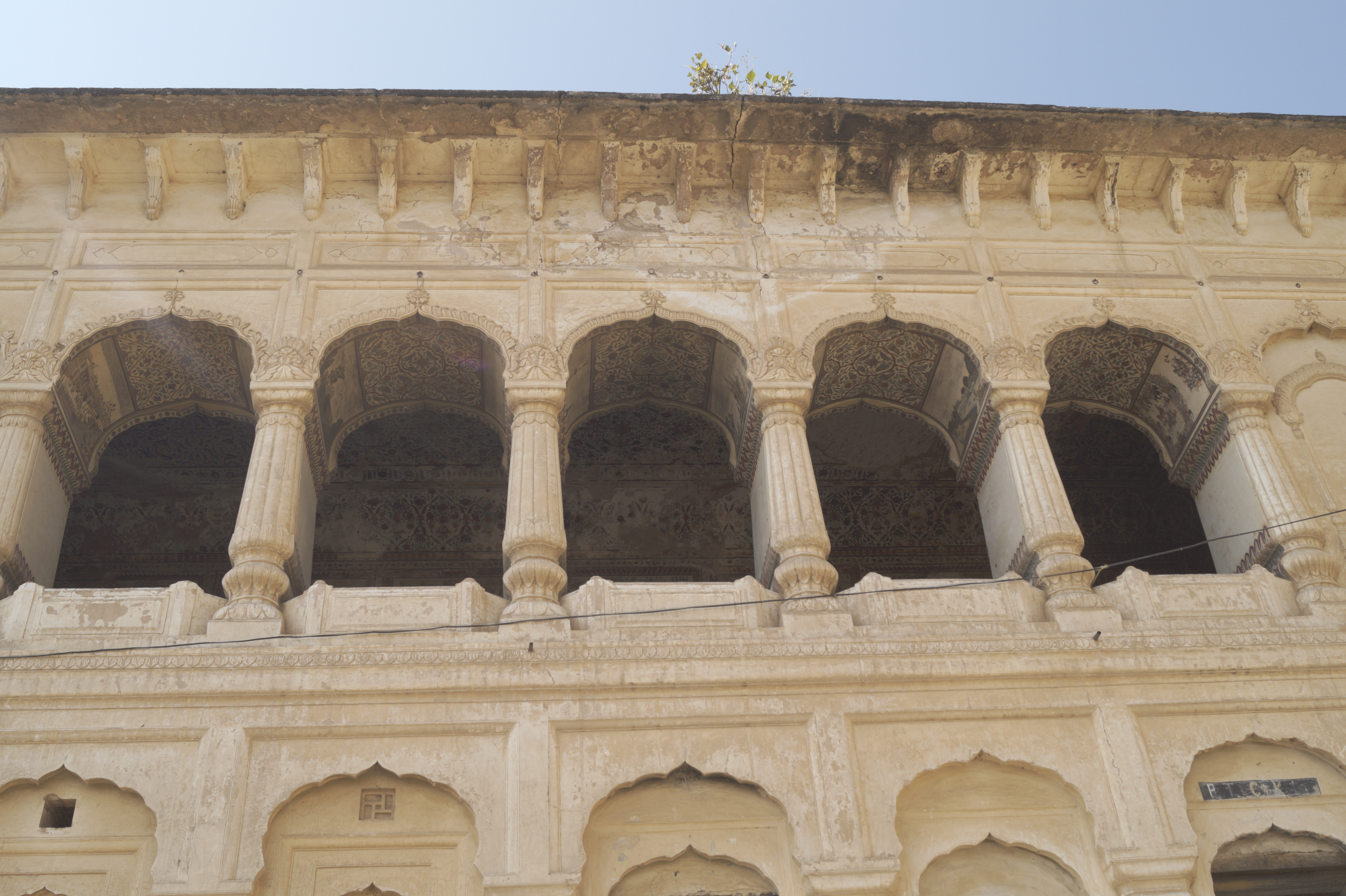
Design and wall painting of palace of Arki/Bhagal princely state
