= 1977 in India =

- Centuries: 18th; 19th; 20th; 21st
- Decades: 1950s; 1960s; 1970s; 1980s; 1990s
- See also: List of years in India; Timeline of Indian history

Events in the year 1977 in the Republic of India.

== Incumbents ==
- President of India – Fakhruddin Ali Ahmed until 11 February, Neelam Sanjiva Reddy.
- Prime Minister of India – Indira Gandhi until 24 March, Morarji Desai.
- Vice President of India – B.D. Jatti
- Chief Justice of India – Ajit Nath Ray (until 27 January), Mirza Hameedullah Beg (starting 27 January)

=== Governors ===
- Andhra Pradesh –
  - until 17 February: Ramchandra Dhondiba Bhandare
  - 17 February-5 May: B. J. Divan
  - starting 5 May: Sharda Mukherjee
- Assam – L. P. Singh
- Bihar – Jagannath Kaushal
- Gujarat – Kambanthodath Kunhan Vishwanatham
- Haryana – Jaisukh Lal Hathi (until 23 September), Harcharan Singh Brar (starting 23 September)
- Himachal Pradesh – S. Chakravarti (until 16 February), Amin ud-din Ahmad Khan (starting 16 February)
- Jammu and Kashmir – L. K. Jha
- Karnataka – Uma Shankar Dikshit (until 2 August), Govind Narain (starting 2 August)
- Kerala – N. N. Wanchoo (until 10 October), Jothi Venkatachalam (starting 10 October)
- Madhya Pradesh – Satya Narayan Sinha (until 13 October), N. N. Wanchu (starting 13 October)
- Maharashtra – vacant thereafter (until )
- Manipur – L.P. Singh
- Meghalaya – L.P. Singh
- Nagaland – L.P. Singh
- Odisha –
  - until 7 February: Shiva Narayan Shankar
  - 7 February-22 September: Harcharan Singh Brar
  - starting 22 September: Bhagwat Dayal Sharma
- Punjab –
  - until 1 September: Mahendra Mohan Choudhry
  - 1 September-24 September: Ranjit Singh Narula
  - starting 24 September: Jaisukh Lal Hathi
- Rajasthan –
  - until 15 February: Sardar Jogendra Singh
  - 15 February-17 May: Vedpal Tyagi
  - starting 17 May: Raghukul Tilak
- Sikkim – B. B. Lal
- Tamil Nadu –
  - until 8 April: Mohan Lal Sukhadia
  - 9 April-26 April: P. Govindan Nair
  - starting 26 April: Prabhudas Patwari
- Tripura – L. P. Singh
- Uttar Pradesh – Marri Chenna Reddy (until 1 October), Ganpatrao Devji Tapase (starting 1 October)
- West Bengal – Anthony Lancelot Dias

== Events ==
- National income - ₹1,040,235 million
- 18 January - Prime Minister Indira Gandhi, via a radio broadcast, announced that the Lok Sabha would be dissolved and fresh elections would be held in March.
- 3 March – Nehru Planetarium commissioned.
- 24 March – The first non-Congress government sweeps to power following Indira Gandhi's defeat at the general elections. Morarji Desai becomes prime minister.
- 25 March - T. V. Eachara Warrier filed Habeas corpus before Kerala High Court for knowing whereabouts of his son in connection with Rajan case.
- 27 May - Belchhi massacre: 11 villagers of Belchi, Bihar (includes 8 Dalits and 3 Sunar) were brutally murdered by terror gang from Kurmi/Bhumihar caste as part of caste violence.
- 30 June - M. G. Ramachandran sworn in as Chief Minister of Tamil Nadu. He became the first film actor to be the Chief Minister of an Indian state.
- 7 July – George Fernandes became Minister of Industries in Morarji Desai ministry.
- 20 November – More than 10,000 people die when the 1977 Andhra Pradesh cyclone hits India's southeast coast. The storm disrupts life for 5.4 million people in 830 villages, and damages 14,000 km^{2} of cropland.
- 8 December - Morarji Desai Government digs out Time capsule buried by Indira Gandhi in Red Fort premises in 1973.

== Law ==
- 3 Jan - The 42nd amendment Act, 1976, was commenced.
- 21 March - Emergency was officially withdrawn.

== Births ==
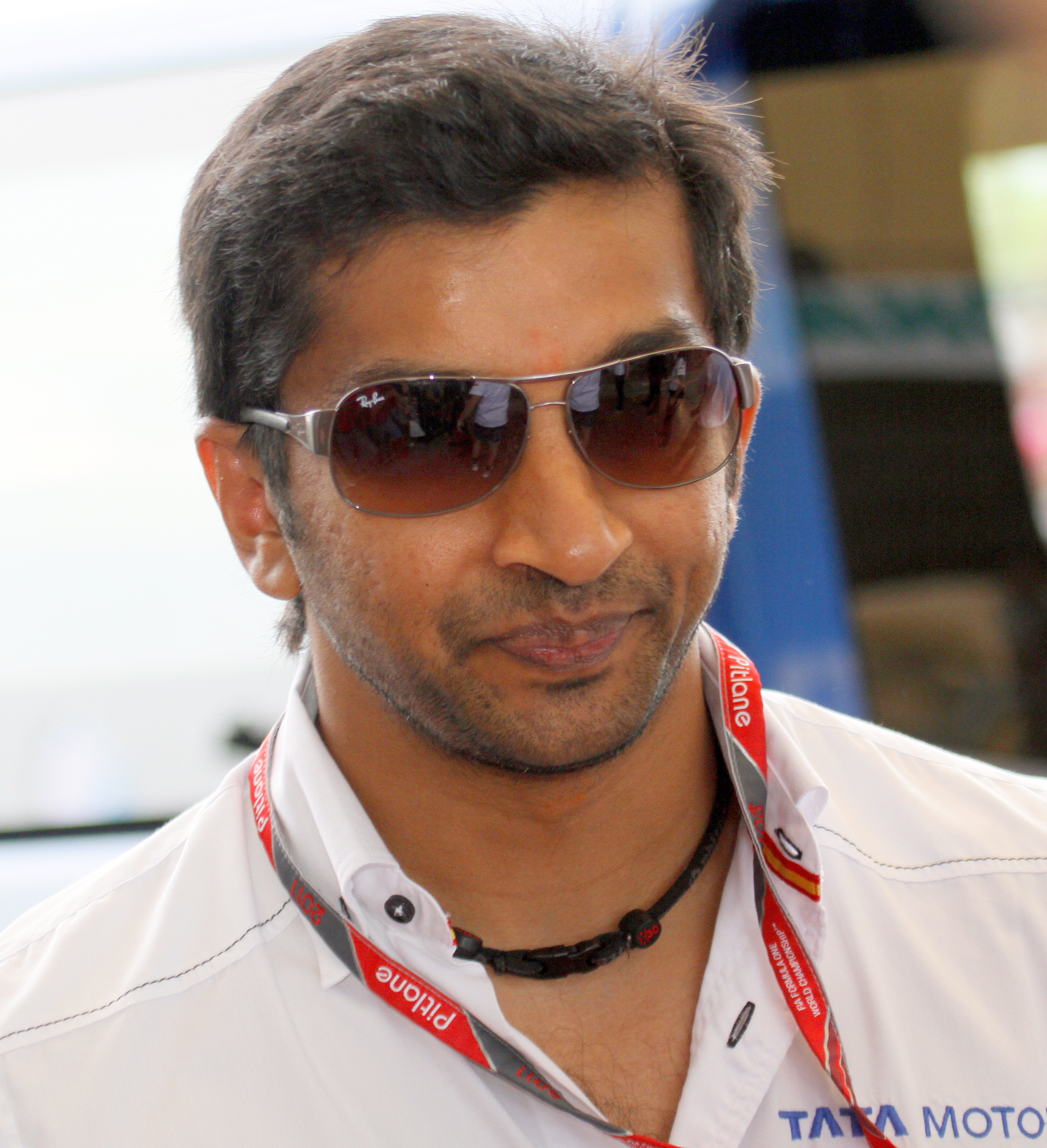
- Narain Karthikeyan
  14 January – Narain Karthikeyan, motor racing driver
- 27 January – Deepshikha Nagpal, actress
- 31 January – Suchitra Singh, cricketer
- 5 February – Darez Ahamed, IAS
- 16 February – Darshan Thoogudeep, actor and film producer
- 21 February – Ranjith, singer and composer
- 15 March – Sandeep Unnikrishnan, Armed force officer (d. 2008).
- 4 April – Shamshuddin Ibrahim, model and actor
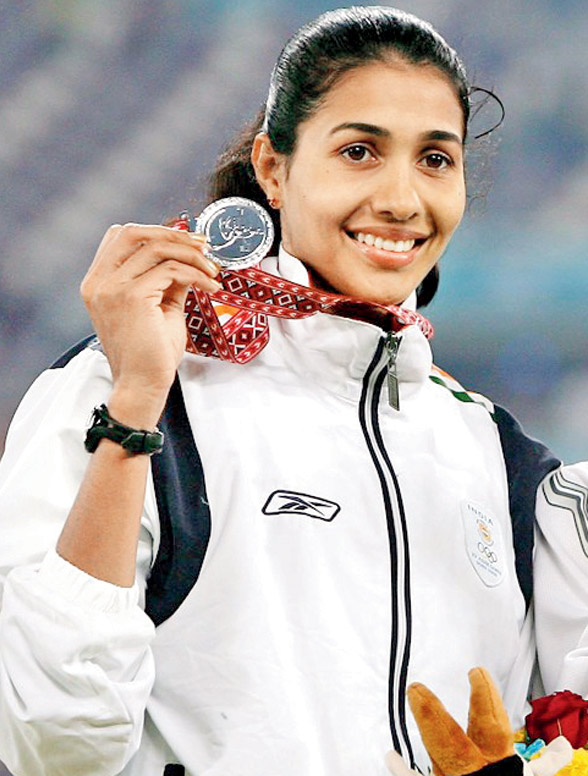
- Anju Bobby George
  19 April – Anju Bobby George, athlete
- 24 May – Jeet Gannguli, singer, music director and score composer
- 25 May – Karthik Sivakumar, actor
- 19 June – Smita Sabharwal, Indian Administrative Service Officer
- 2 July – Ganesh, actor.
- 12 August – Siva, film director.
- 19 August – Suvaluxmi, actress.
- 27 August – Soori, actor and comedian.
- 29 August – Vishal Krishna, actor and film producer
- 29 August – P. V. Midhun Reddy, politician and former member of parliament from Rajampet
- 19 September - Vennela Kishore, actor, comedian and director.
- 18 October – Kunal Kapoor, actor.
- 19 November – Arun Vijay, actor.
- 24 November – Dilip Tirkey, field hockey player
- 20 December – Gauri Karnik, actress

=== Full date unknown ===
- Rajorshi Chakraborti, novelist.
- Vasundhara Das, actress and singer.

== Deaths ==
- 11 February – Fakhruddin Ali Ahmed, fifth President of India (b. 1905)
- 22 March – A. K. Gopalan, communist leader (b. 1904).
- 14 November – A. C. Bhaktivedanta Swami Prabhupada, founder–acharya of the International Society for Krishna Consciousness (b. 1896).

=== Full date unknown ===
- Hamid Dalwai, social reformer and writer (b. 1932).
- Abdul Majid Daryabadi, Muslim writer and exegete of the Qur'an (b. 1892).

== See also ==
- Bollywood films of 1977
