= 1979 in India =

- Centuries: 18th; 19th; 20th; 21st
- Decades: 1950s; 1960s; 1970s; 1980s; 1990s
- See also: List of years in India; Timeline of Indian history

Events in the year 1979 in the Republic of India.

== Incumbents ==
- President of India – Neelam Sanjiva Reddy
- Prime Minister of India – Morarji Desai until 28 July, Charan Singh
- Vice President of India – B.D. Jatti until 30 August; Mohammad Hidayatullah
- Chief Justice of India – Yeshwant Vishnu Chandrachud

=== Governors ===
- Andhra Pradesh – K.C. Abraham
- Assam – L. P. Singh
- Bihar –
  - until 31 January: Jagannath Kaushal
  - 31 January-20 September: K.B.N. Singh
  - starting 20 September: Akhlaqur Rahman Kidwai
- Gujarat – Sharda Mukherjee
- Haryana – Harcharan Singh Brar (until 9 December), Surjit Singh Sandhawalia (starting 10 December)
- Himachal Pradesh – Amin ud-din Ahmad Khan
- Jammu and Kashmir – L. K. Jha
- Karnataka – Govind Narain
- Kerala – Jothi Venkatachalam
- Madhya Pradesh – C. M. Poonacha
- Maharashtra – Sri Sadiq Ali
- Manipur – L.P. Singh
- Meghalaya – L.P. Singh
- Nagaland – L.P. Singh
- Odisha – Bhagwat Dayal Sharma
- Punjab – Jaisukh Lal Hathi
- Rajasthan – Raghukul Tilak
- Sikkim – B. B. Lal
- Tamil Nadu – Prabhudas Patwari
- Tripura – L. P. Singh
- Uttar Pradesh – Ganpatrao Devji Tapase
- West Bengal – Anthony Lancelot Dias (until 6 November), Tribhuvana Narayana Singh (starting 6 November)

== Events ==
- National income - ₹1,235,622 million
- 1 January – President of India makes official the decision to set up the Mandal Commission
- 22 January – 12 Iranian students who claimed to be members of the Iranian Islamic Students Association laid siege to the Iranian consulate at Churchgate.
- 31 January – The police under direction of Jyoti Basu, Chief Minister of Communist Party of India (Marxist) -led government of West Bengal, surrounds and opens fire on unarmed refugee settlement of Morichjhapi island in Sunderbans, West Bengal. (Marichjhapi massacre)
- 13 May – a tropical cyclone hits Coastal Andhra and destroys 7 lakh homes and affects 40 lakh people.
- 1 June – Vizianagaram district is formed in Andhra Pradesh.
- 27 June – CISF conflict at Bokaro
- 2 July – Athi Varadhar came out after 40 years in Varadharaja Perumal Temple, Kanchipuram.
- 3 July – A cargo ship named MV Kairali owned by Kerala Shipping Corporation went missing on its journey carrying iron ore from Mormugao to Rostock.
- 28 July – Charan Singh of Bharatiya Lok Dal, coalition partner of Janata Party became Prime Minister of India with outside support of Congress (I).
- 11 August – Morvi dam burst, the worst flood disaster in independent India, happens in Gujarat, killing 1500-15000 people
- 1 September - Biju Patnaik mediates for an unsuccessful merger attempt between Dravida Munnetra Kazhagam and All India Anna Dravida Munnetra Kazhagam.
- 12 October – C. H. Mohammed Koya sworn in as Chief minister of Kerala. He is the first Muslim League leader to become Chief Minister of an Indian state.
- 10 December – Mother Teresa was awarded Nobel Peace Prize at Oslo.

== Births ==
=== January to June ===
- 1 January – Vidya Balan, actress.
- 3 January – Gul Panag, actress
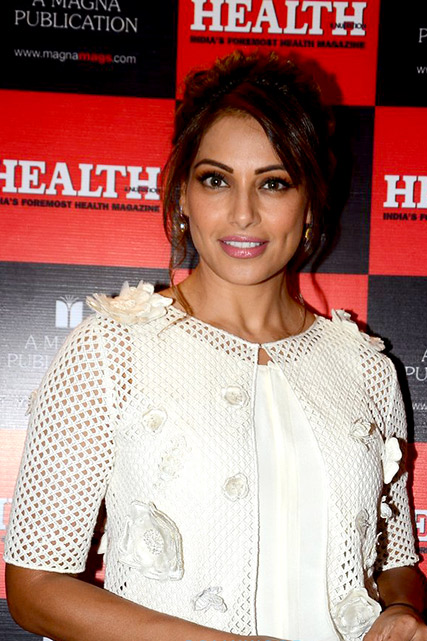
- Bipasha Basu
  7 January – Bipasha Basu, actress and model.
- 16 January – Climax Lawrence, footballer
- 2 February – Shamita Shetty, actress
- 26 February – Premgi Amaren, playback singer, composer, songwriter, actor and comedian.
- 28 February – Srikanth
- 24 March – Emraan Hashmi, actor.
- 8 April – Amit Trivedi, music director, singer, film scorer
- 28 April – Sharman Joshi, actor
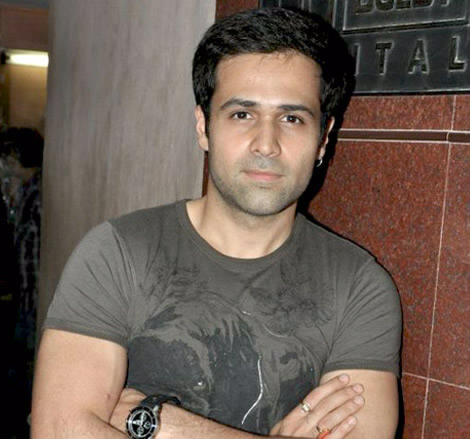
  Emraan Hashmi
- 23 May – Divya Palat, actress.
- 10 June – D. K. Ravi, late IAS officer. (d. 2015)
- 12 June – Tottempudi Gopichand, actor.
- 18 June – A. L. Vijay, film director.
- 20 June – Renedy Singh, footballer.

=== July to December ===
- 19 July – Malavika, actress.
- 27 July – Vamshi Paidipally, film director.
- 29 July – Hard Kaur, rapper
- 2 August – Devi Sri Prasad, music composer and singer.
- 10 August – Shabir Ahluwalia, television actor
- 31 August – Yuvan Shankar Raja, film composer and singer.
- 1 September – Aamir Ali, actor
- 11 September – Tulip Joshi, model and actress.

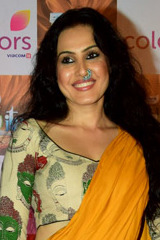
Kamya Punjabi

- 14 September – Kamya Panjabi, actress.
- 18 September – Vinay Rai, actor.
- 27 September – B Chandrakala, Indian Administrative Service officer.
- 7 October – Narain, actor.
- 23 October – Prabhas, actor.
- 4 November – Lazarus Barla, field hockey player.
- 7 November – Raima Sen, actress
- 18 November – Neeti Mohan, singer
- 20 November – Shalini, actress and child artist.
- 3 December – Konkona Sen Sharma, actress
- 14 December – Samit Basu, novelist.
- 30 December – Kausalya, actress.

== Deaths ==
- 9 February – Banaphool, author, playwright and poet (b. 1899).
- 11 February – Mayavaram V. R. Govindaraja Pillai, Carnatic violinist (b. 1912)
- 19 May – Hazari Prasad Dwivedi, novelist, literary historian, essayist, critic and scholar (b. 1907).
- 18 August – Vasantrao Phulsing Naik, Politician, Former Chief Minister of Maharashtra (b. 1913)
- 3 December – Dhyan Chand, field hockey player (b. 1905).
- 8 October – Jayaprakash Narayan, political activist (b. 1902)
- 20 October – D.K.Sapru, character actor. (b. 1916).

== See also ==
- List of Bollywood films of 1979
