= 1978 in India =

- Centuries: 18th; 19th; 20th; 21st
- Decades: 1950s; 1960s; 1970s; 1980s; 1990s
- See also: List of years in India; Timeline of Indian history

Events in the year 1978 in the Republic of India.

== Incumbents ==
- President of India – Neelam Sanjiva Reddy
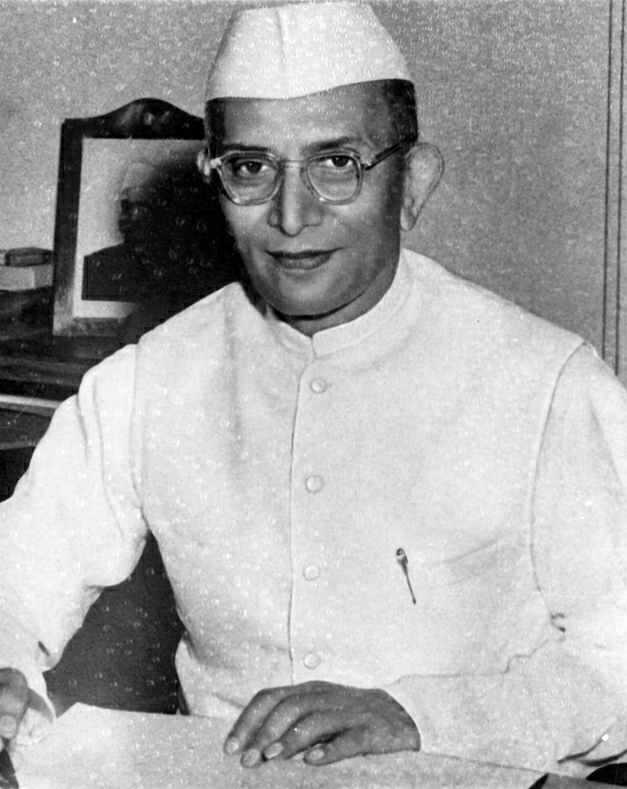
- Morarji Desai
  Prime Minister of India – Morarji Desai
- Vice President of India – B.D. Jatti
- Chief Justice of India – Mirza Hameedullah Beg (until 21 February), Yeshwant Vishnu Chandrachud (starting 22 February)

=== Governors ===
- Andhra Pradesh – Sharda Mukherjee (until 15 August), K. C. Abraham (starting 15 August)
- Assam – L. P. Singh
- Bihar – Jagannath Kaushal
- Gujarat – Kambanthodath Kunhan Vishwanatham (until 14 August), Sharda Mukherjee (starting 14 August)
- Haryana – Harcharan Singh Brar
- Himachal Pradesh – Amin ud-din Ahmad Khan
- Jammu and Kashmir – L. K. Jha
- Karnataka – Govind Narain
- Kerala – Jothi Venkatachalam
- Madhya Pradesh – N. N. Wanchu (until 16 August), C. M. Poonacha (starting 16 August)
- Maharashtra – Sri Sadiq Ali
- Manipur – L.P. Singh
- Meghalaya – L.P. Singh
- Nagaland – L.P. Singh
- Odisha – Bhagwat Dayal Sharma
- Punjab – Jaisukh Lal Hathi
- Rajasthan – Raghukul Tilak
- Sikkim – B B Lal
- Tamil Nadu – Prabhudas Patwari
- Tripura – L. P. Singh
- Uttar Pradesh – Ganpatrao Devji Tapase
- West Bengal – Anthony Lancelot Dias

== Events ==
- National income - ₹1,126,714 million
- 1 January – Air India Flight 855, a Boeing 747 passenger jet, crashes into the Arabian Sea after taking off shortly near Bombay, killing all 213 on board.
- 16 January – Morarji Desai led government demonetizes high denomination banknotes.
- 29 March – Dr. Leo Rebello pioneers a 60 lessons distance learning course in Naturopathy to train Naturopaths to serve in India's 560,000 villages.
- 1 May – Launch of District Industrial Centre by Minister of Industries George Fernandes.
- 7 November – Indira Gandhi is re-elected to the Indian parliament.
- 19 December – Indira Gandhi is arrested and jailed for a week for breach of privilege and contempt of parliament.

== Births ==
=== January to June ===
- 4 January – Ramana (actor), actor and producer.
- 13 January – Ashmit Patel, actor.
- 16 January – Vijay Sethupathi, actor.
- 21 March – Rani Mukerji, actress.
- 28 March – Nafisa Joseph, model, MTV VJ, Miss India 1997 (d.2004).
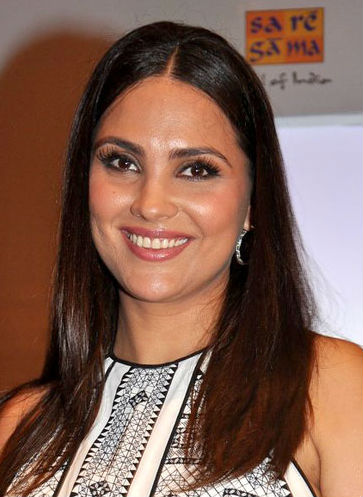
- Lara Dutta
  16 April – Lara Dutta, actress, Miss Universe in 2000.
- 5 May – Sandeep Baswana, actor.
- 25 June – Aftab Shivdasani, actor.

=== July to December ===
- 17 August – Disha Vakani, actress.
- 21 August – Bhumika Chawla, actress.
- 31 August – Jayasurya, actor.
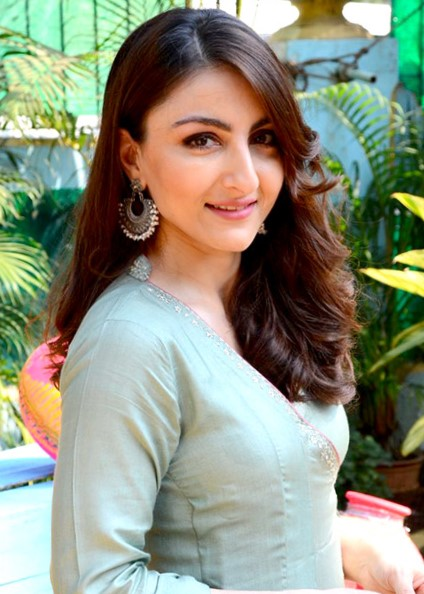
- Soha Ali Khan
  4 October – Soha Ali Khan, actress.
- 18 October – Jyothika, actress.
- 20 October – Virender Sehwag, cricketer.
- 1 November – Manju Warrier, actress.
- 25 November – Sameer Dad, field hockey player.
- 25 November – Rakhi Sawant, actress

== Deaths ==
- 19 February – Pankaj Mullick, singer and composer (b. 1905).
- 20 May – P. S. Subrahmanya Sastri, Sanskrit scholar (b. 1890).
- 7 June – I. K. Taimni, chemist (b. 1898).
- 18 November – Dhirendra Nath Ganguly, film entrepreneur, actor and director (b. 1893).

== See also ==
- Bollywood films of 1978
