= 1980 in India =

- Centuries: 18th; 19th; 20th; 21st
- Decades: 1960s; 1970s; 1980s; 1990s; 2000s
- See also: List of years in India; Timeline of Indian history

Events in the year 1980 in the Republic of India.

== Incumbents ==
- President of India – Neelam Sanjiva Reddy
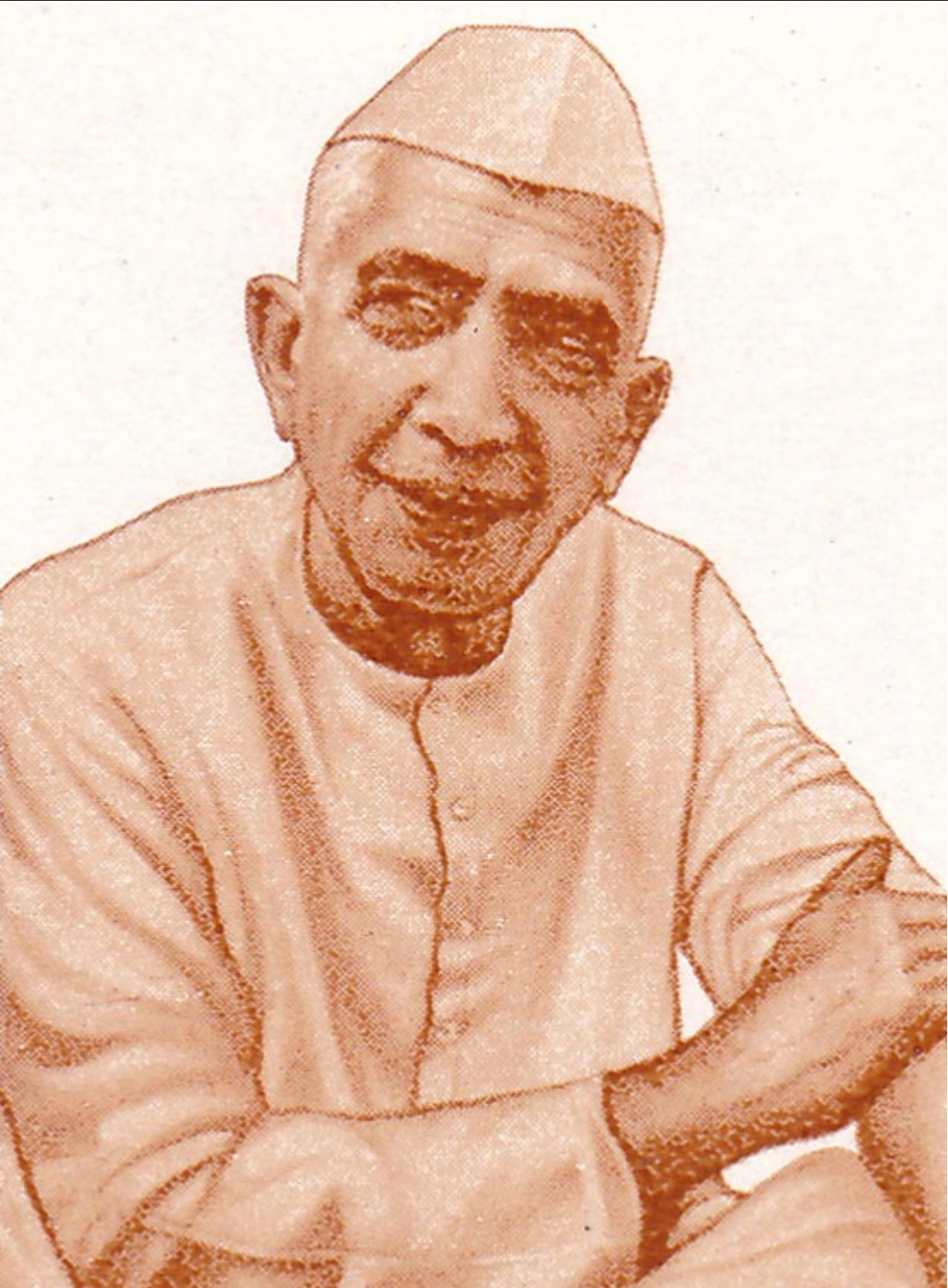
- Charan Singh
  Prime Minister of India – Charan Singh until 14 January, then Indira Gandhi again became the prime minister of India.
- Vice President of India – Mohammad Hidayatullah
- Chief Justice of India – Yeshwant Vishnu Chandrachud

=== Governors ===
- Andhra Pradesh – K. C. Abraham
- Assam – L. P. Singh
- Bihar – Akhlaqur Rahman Kidwai
- Gujarat – Sharda Mukherjee
- Haryana – Surjit Singh Sandhawalia (until 27 February), Ganpatrao Devji Tapase (starting 27 February)
- Himachal Pradesh – Amin ud-din Ahmad Khan
- Jammu and Kashmir – L. K. Jha
- Karnataka – Govind Narain
- Kerala – Jothi Venkatachalam
- Madhya Pradesh – C. M. Poonacha (until 30 April), B. D. Sharma (starting 30 April)
- Maharashtra – Sri Sadiq Ali (until 3 November), O. P. Mehra (starting 3 November)
- Manipur – L.P. Singh
- Meghalaya – L.P. Singh
- Nagaland – L.P. Singh
- Odisha –
  - until 30 April: Bhagwat Dayal Sharma
  - 30 April-30 September: Cheppudira Muthana Poonacha
  - 1 October-3 November: S. K. Ray
  - starting 3 November: Cheppudira Muthana Poonacha
- Punjab – Jaisukh Lal Hathi
- Rajasthan – Raghukul Tilak
- Sikkim – B. B. Lal
- Tamil Nadu –
  - until 26 October: Prabhudas Patwari
  - 26 October-3 November: M. M. Ismail
  - starting 3 November: Sadiq Ali
- Tripura – L. P. Singh
- Uttar Pradesh – Ganpatrao Devji Tapase (until 27 February), Chandeshwar Prasad Narayan Singh (starting 27 February)
- West Bengal – Tribhuvana Narayana Singh

== Events ==
- National income - ₹1,470,629 million
- 1 January – India asks Soviet Union for troop withdrawal from Afghanistan.

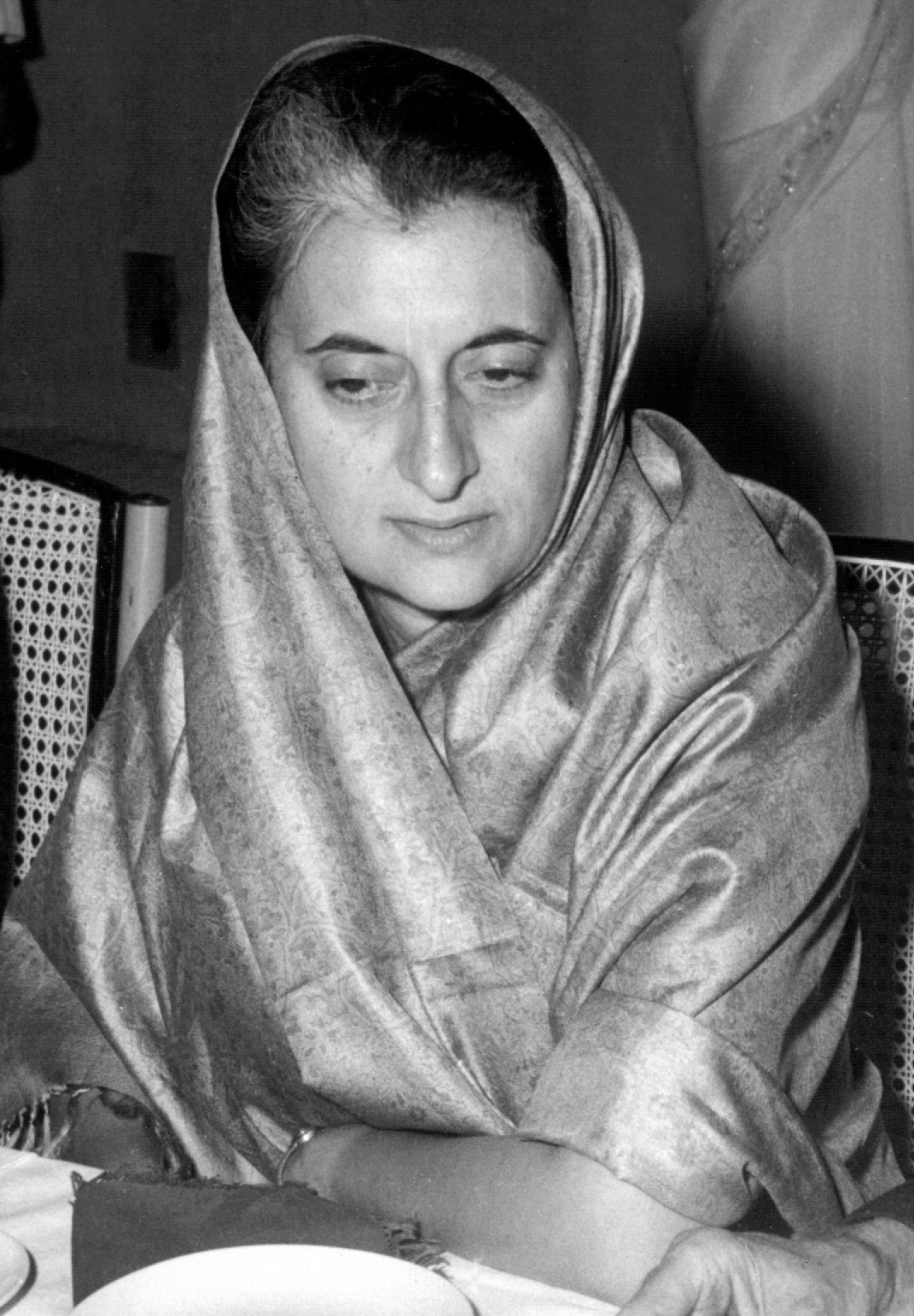
Indira Gandhi the first female Prime Minister of India is returned to the office a second time.

- 14 January – Indira Gandhi returned to power.
- 5 April - Bharatiya Janata Party was formed.
- 23 June – Sanjay Gandhi is killed in a plane crash near Safdarjung Airport.
- 18 July - SLV-3 successfully launched from Sriharikota.
- Rajiv Gandhi quits working as pilot for Indian Airlines.
- The Bhagalpur Blindings were widely publicized by Indian media.
- 31 December – B. P. Mandal, chairman of the Backward Classes Commission, submitted his report to the government.

== Law ==
- 25 October - Forest (Conservation) Act

== Science ==
- 1983 - Subrahmanyan Chandrasekhar received the Nobel Prize in Physics

== Sport ==
The Indian Hockey team won the Gold in the Olympics.

== Births ==
- 21 January – Santhanam, actor and comedian.
- 10 February – Mohd. Iqbal Khan, actor.
- 13 March – Varun Gandhi, politician
- 17 March – Nikitin Dheer, actor
- 20 April – Sunaina Sunaina, weightlifter
- 2 June – Dola Banerjee, archer
- 4 June – Prashanth Neel, film director.
- 20 June – Bobby Darling, actor.
- 5 July – Zayed Khan, actor.
- 7 July – Ramachandra Raju, actor.
- 8 July – Chetan Anand, badminton player.
- 12 August – Ghibran, music composer.
- 14 August – Prabhjot Singh, field hockey player.
- 16 August – Upen Patel, model and actor.
- 18 August – Preeti Jhangiani, actress and model.
- 30 August – Richa Pallod, model and actress.
- 10 September – Jayam Ravi, actor.
- 18 September – Akshay Kapoor, actor.
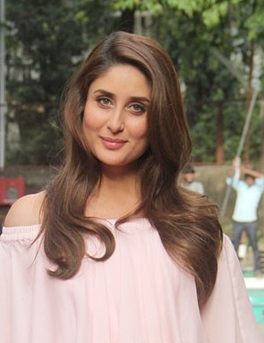
- Kareena Kapoor
  21 September – Kareena Kapoor, actress.
- 18 October – Reetinder Singh Sodhi, cricketer.
- 24 October – Laila Mehdin, actress.
- 12 November – Devesh Chauhan, field hockey player.
- 13 November – Harman Baweja, actor.
- 9 December – Gagan Ajit Singh, field hockey player.
- 11 December – Arya, actor.
- 17 December – Arjun Halappa, field hockey player.
- 28 December – Deepak Thakur, field hockey player.

== Deaths ==
- 23 June – Sanjay Gandhi, politician (b. 1946).
- 23 June – Varahagiri Venkata Giri, fourth president of India (b. 1894).
- 18 July – Naoomal Jeoomal, cricketer (b. 1904).
- 24 July – Uttam Kumar, actor (b. 1926).
- 31 July – Mohammed Rafi, playback singer (b. 1924).
- 2 August – Ramkinkar Baij, sculptor and painter (b. 1906)
- 17 August – Kodavatiganti Kutumbarao, writer (b. 1909).
- 25 October – Sahir Ludhianvi, Urdu poet and Hindi lyricist and songwriter (b. 1921).
- 11 November – Chenganoor Raman Pillai, Kathakali artiste (b. 1886).
- 16 November – Jayan, actor (b. 1938).
