= 1981 in India =

- Centuries: 18th; 19th; 20th; 21st
- Decades: 1960s; 1970s; 1980s; 1990s; 2000s
- See also: List of years in India; Timeline of Indian history

Events in the year 1981 in the Republic of India.

== Incumbents ==
- President of India – Neelam Sanjiva Reddy
- Prime Minister of India – Indira Gandhi
- Vice President of India – Mohammad Hidayatullah
- Chief Justice of India – Yeshwant Vishnu Chandrachud

=== Governors ===
- Andhra Pradesh – K. C. Abraham
- Assam – L. P. Singh (until 10 August), Prakash Mehrotra (starting 10 August)
- Bihar – Akhlaqur Rahman Kidwai
- Gujarat – Sharda Mukherjee
- Haryana – Ganpatrao Devji Tapase
- Himachal Pradesh – Amin ud-din Ahmad Khan (until 26 August), A. K. Banerjee (starting 26 August)
- Jammu and Kashmir – L. K. Jha (until 22 February), B. K. Nehru (starting 22 February)
- Karnataka – Govind Narain
- Kerala – Jothi Venkatachalam
- Madhya Pradesh –
  - until 25 May: B. D. Sharma
  - 25 May-9 July: G. P. Singh
  - starting 9 July: B. D. Sharma
- Maharashtra – O. P. Mehra
- Manipur – L.P. Singh (until 18 August), S. M. H. Burney (starting 18 August)
- Meghalaya – L.P. Singh (until 11 August), Prakash Mehrotra (starting 11 August)
- Nagaland – L.P. Singh (until 11 August), S. M. H. Burney (starting 11 August)
- Odisha – Cheppudira Muthana Poonacha
- Punjab – Jaisukh Lal Hathi (until 26 August), Aminuddin Ahmad Khan (starting 26 August)
- Rajasthan – Raghukul Tilak (until 8 August), K. D. Sharma (starting 8 August)
- Sikkim – B. B. Lal (until 9 January), Homi J. H. Taleyarkhan (starting 10 January)
- Tamil Nadu – Sadiq Ali
- Tripura – L. P. Singh (until 18 August), S. M. H. Burney (starting 18 August)
- Uttar Pradesh – Chandeshwar Prasad Narayan Singh
- West Bengal – Tribhuvana Narayana Singh (until 12 September), Bhairab Dutt Pande (starting 12 August)

== Events ==
- National income - ₹1,727,755 million
- April 30 - Nearly 48 killed in Bihar Sharif due to communal riots between Yadavs and Muslims.
- July – About 308 people die in Bangalore after drinking illicit liquor (see: 1981 Karnataka liquor deaths).
- Arasan Ganesan Polytechnic is founded in Sivakasi, Tamil Nadu. It is a Government aided co-educational technical institute.
- National Aluminium Company incorporated as a public sector enterprise of the Government of India.
- 2 July – Infosys is founded in Pune.
- 4 December - Around 45 people got killed due to a stampede at Qutb Minar resulting in closure of Minaret for tourists.

== Births ==
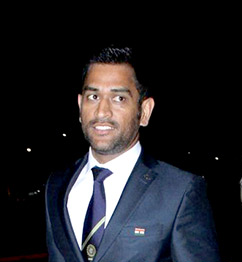
MS Dhoni

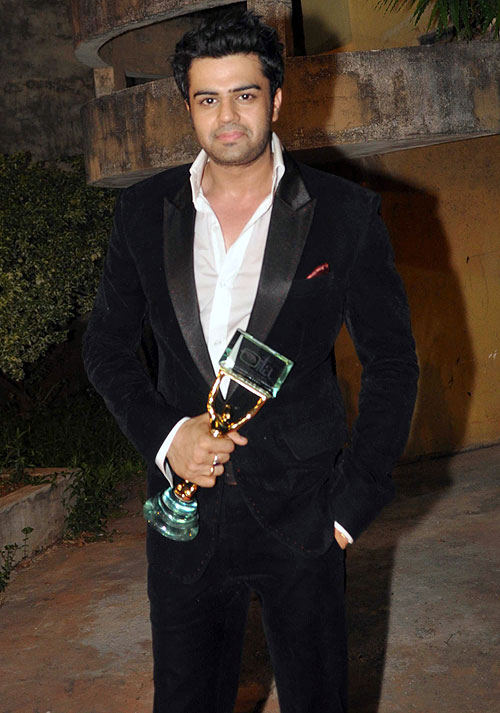
Manish Paul

- 3 January – Sanggai Chanu, field hockey player.
- 28 January – Karunakaran (actor), actor and comedian.
- 25 February – Anuj Sawhney, actor and model.
- Saroo Brierley, writer
- 9 June – Celina Jaitley, actress.
- 17 June – Amrita Rao, model and actress.
- 7 July – Mahendra Singh Dhoni, cricketer.
- 3 August – Manish Paul, Indian television host, anchor and actor
- 25 August – Shiva Keshavan, luge pilot
- 30 August – Shilpa Prabhakar Satish, IAS.
- 5 September – H. Vinoth, film director.
- 27 September – Lakshmipathy Balaji, cricketer.
- 7 October – Abhijeet Sawant, singer and winner of Indian Idol (season 1).
- 12 October – Sneha, actress.
- 14 October – Gautam Gambhir, cricketer and politician
- 7 November – Anushka Shetty, actress.
- 27 November – Vikram Pillay, field hockey player.
- 9 December – Dia Mirza, actress and model.
- 12 December - Ashok, actor.
- 12 December -Yuvraj Singh, cricketer.

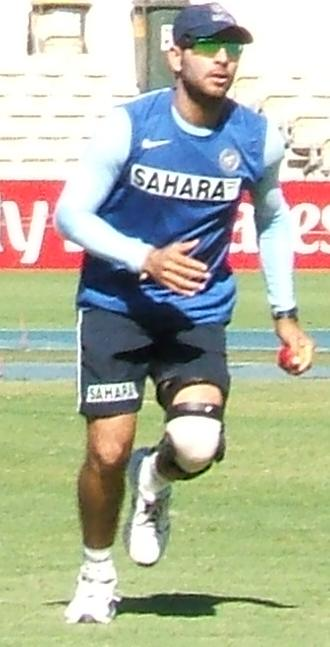
Yuvraj Singh

== Deaths ==
- 3 May – Nargis, actress (born 1929).
- 19 June – Subhas Mukhopadhyay, Physician created World's second IVF (born 1931)
- 24 September – Brahmarishi Hussain Sha, seventh head of Sri Viswa Viznana Vidya Adhyatmika Peetham and scholar (born 1905).
- 26 December – Savitri, actress (born 1936).
- 28 December – David Abraham Cheulkar, actor (born 1908).

== See also ==
- List of Bollywood films of 1981
