= 1982 in India =

- Centuries: 18th; 19th; 20th; 21st
- Decades: 1960s; 1970s; 1980s; 1990s; 2000s
- See also: List of years in India; Timeline of Indian history

Events in the year 1982 in the Republic of India.

== Incumbents ==
- President of India – Neelam Sanjiva Reddy until 25 July, Zail Singh
- Prime Minister of India – Indira Gandhi
- Vice President of India – Mohammad Hidayatullah
- Chief Justice of India – Yeshwant Vishnu Chandrachud

=== Governors ===
- Andhra Pradesh – K. C. Abraham
- Assam – Prakash Mehrotra
- Bihar – Akhlaqur Rahman Kidwai
- Gujarat – Sharda Mukherjee
- Haryana – Ganpatrao Devji Tapase
- Himachal Pradesh – A. K. Banerjee
- Jammu and Kashmir – B. K. Nehru
- Karnataka – Govind Narain (until 15 April), Ashoknath Banerji (starting 15 April)
- Kerala – Jothi Venkatachalam (until 27 October), P. Ramachandran (starting 27 October)
- Madhya Pradesh – B. D. Sharma
- Maharashtra – O. P. Mehra (until 5 March), Idris Hasan Latif (starting 5 March)
- Manipur – S. M. H. Burney
- Meghalaya – Prakash Mehrotra
- Nagaland – S. M. H. Burney
- Odisha –
  - until 24 June: Cheppudira Muthana Poonacha
  - 25 June-31 August: Ranganath Misra
  - starting 1 September: Cheppudira Muthana Poonacha
- Punjab – Aminuddin Ahmad Khan (until 21 April), Marri Chenna Reddy (starting 21 April)
- Rajasthan – K. D. Sharma (until 6 March), Om Prakash Mehra (starting 6 March)
- Sikkim – Homi J. H. Taleyarkhan
- Tamil Nadu – Sadiq Ali (until 6 September), Sundar Lal Khurana (starting 6 September)
- Tripura – S. M. H. Burney
- Uttar Pradesh – Chandeshwar Prasad Narayan Singh
- West Bengal – Bhairab Dutt Pande

== Events ==
- National income - ₹1,932,546 million
- March 5 - Gonda Encounter.
- April – INSAT-1A launched; deactivated in September.
- April 7 - Charan Singh announces retirement from active politics.
- April 25 - Doordarshan begins testing of Color television broadcast in India.
- April 30 - Bijon Setu massacre seventeen Ananda Margis were set ablaze at Bijon Setu in Dhakuria in south Kolkata. No one has been convicted of the murders.
- May 29 - Government of India announced setting up of a permanent and integrated Indian Naval Academy at Ezhimala (hill, Kannur).
- July 12 – NABARD established through act of Parliament following B. Sivaraman Committee recommendation.
- September 1 - Vypeen alcohol poisonings.
- September 16 - Future Prime Minister of India Manmohan Singh becomes Governor of the Reserve Bank of India

== Sport ==
- 19 November – 4 December – 9th Asian Games held in Delhi.

== Births ==
- 15 January – Neil Nitin Mukesh, actor.
- 15 February – Meera Jasmine, actress.
- 13 March – Darbuka Siva, percussionist and composer.
- 28 March – Sonia Agarwal, actress.
- 8 April – Allu Arjun, actor.
- 28 April – Koyel Mullick, actress.
- 19 May – R. K. Suresh, actor and producer.
- 24 May – Kanchi Kaul, actress.
- 12 June – Shailaja Pujari, weightlifter
- 30 June – Allari Naresh, actor.
- 3 July – Kanika Subramaniam, actress.
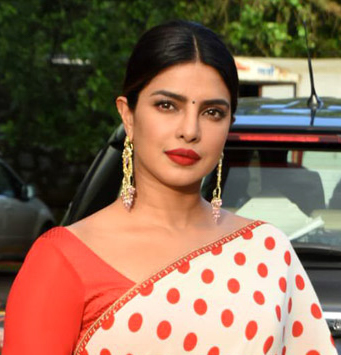
- Priyanka Chopra
  18 July – Priyanka Chopra, actress, Miss World 2000.
- 8 August – Fahadh Faasil, actor.
- 28 August – Prasanna, actor.
- 4 September – Gaurav Gogoi, politician.
- 11 September – Shriya Saran, actress,
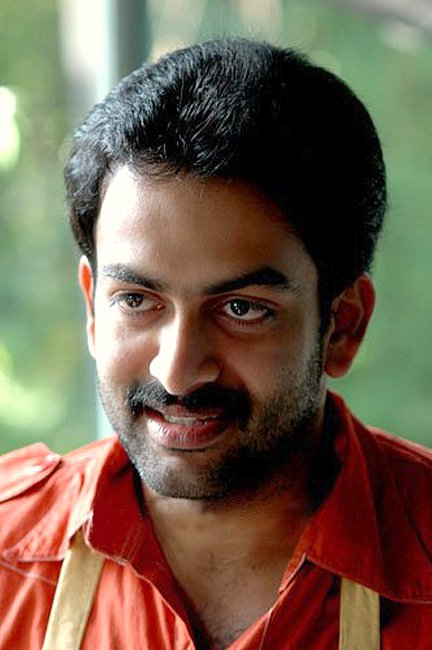
- Prithviraj Sukumaran
  28 September – Ranbir Kapoor, actor
- 12 October – Hanif Kureshi, artist and designer (d. 2024)
- 16 October – Prithviraj Sukumaran actor,
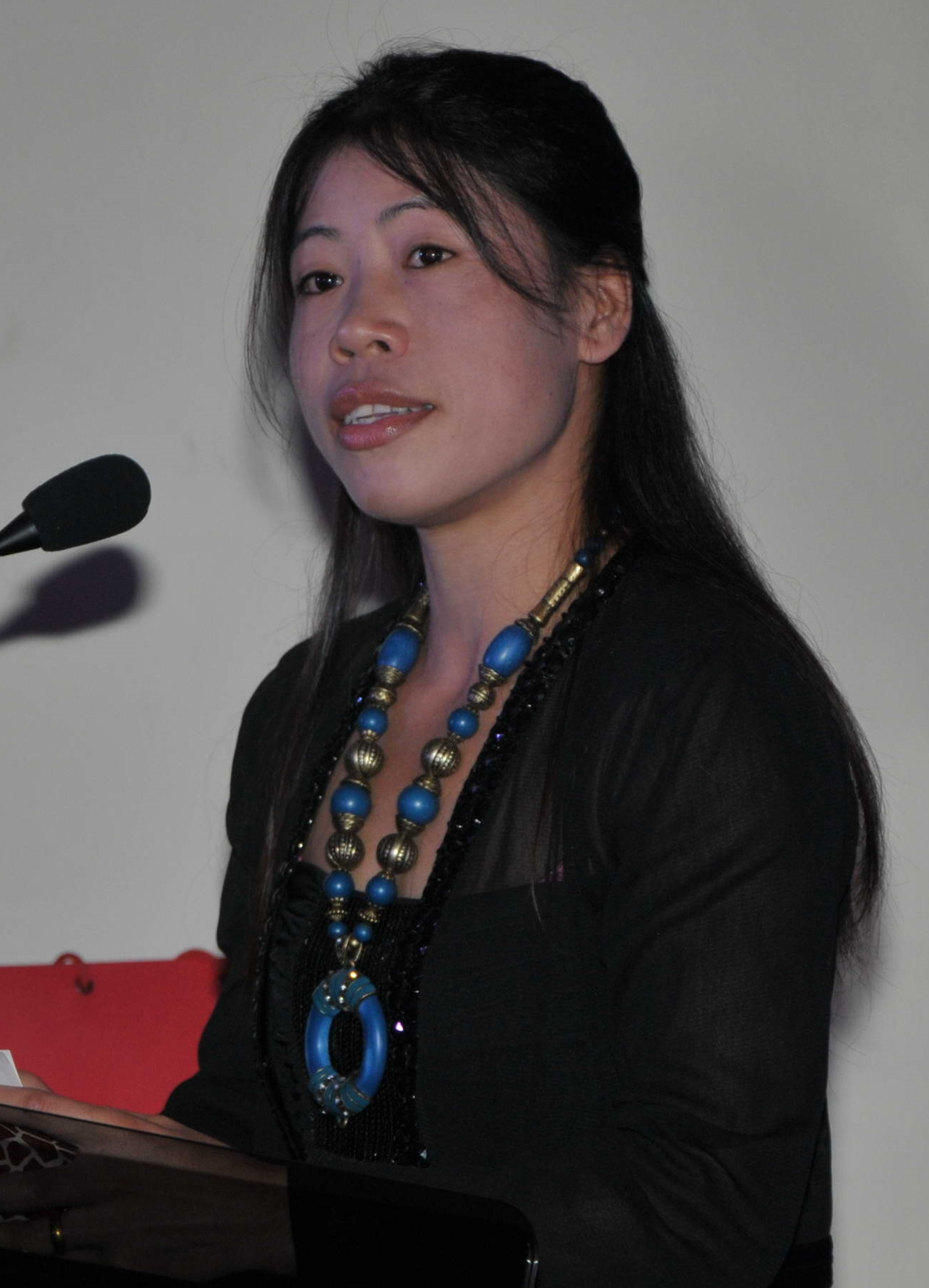
- Mary Kom
- 21 November – Aarti Chhabria, actress and model.
- 24 November – Mary Kom, boxer
- 8 December – Pa. Ranjith, film director.
- 10 December – Shiva, actor, comedian, radio jockey, and dialogue writer.
- 14 December – Aadhi Pinisetty, actor.
- 15 December – Shefali Jariwala, actress and model (d. 2025)

== Deaths ==
- 11 January – Manya Surve, Indian urban dacoit and gangster in the Mumbai underworld (born 1944).
- 3 August – Tribhuvan Narain Singh, Chief Minister of Uttar Pradesh (born 1904).
- 2 October – C.D. Deshmukh, Minister of Finance and first Governor of the Reserve bank of India (b.1896)
- 15 November – Vinoba Bhave, freedom fighter and teacher (born 1895).

=== Full date unknown ===
- Firaq Gorakhpuri, poet (born 1896).

== See also ==
- List of Bollywood films of 1982
