= 1976 in India =

- Centuries: 18th; 19th; 20th; 21st
- Decades: 1950s; 1960s; 1970s; 1980s; 1990s
- See also: List of years in India; Timeline of Indian history

The following events occurred in India in the year 1976.

== Incumbents ==
- President of India – Fakhruddin Ali Ahmed
- Prime Minister of India – Indira Gandhi
- Vice President of India – B.D. Jatti
- Chief Justice of India – Ajit Nath Ray

=== Governors ===
- Andhra Pradesh –
  - until 10 January: S. Obul Reddy
  - 10 January-15 June: Mohanlal Sukhadia
  - starting 15 June: Ramchandra Dhondiba Bhandare
- Assam – L. P. Singh
- Bihar – Ramchandra Dhondiba Bhandare
- Gujarat – Kambanthodath Kunhan Vishwanatham
- Haryana –
  - until 26 March: Birendra Narayan Chakraborty
  - 27 March-13 August: Ranjit Singh Narula
  - starting 13 August: Jaisukh Lal Hathi
- Himachal Pradesh – S. Chakravarti
- Jammu and Kashmir – L. K. Jha
- Karnataka – Uma Shankar Dikshit
- Kerala – N. N. Wanchoo
- Madhya Pradesh – Satya Narayan Sinha
- Maharashtra – Ali Yavar Jung (until 11 December), vacant thereafter (starting 11 December)
- Manipur – L.P. Singh
- Meghalaya – L.P. Singh
- Nagaland – L.P. Singh
- Odisha – Akbar Ali Khan (until 17 April), Shiva Narayan Shankar (starting 17 April)
- Punjab – Mahendra Mohan Choudhry
- Rajasthan – Sardar Jogendra Singh
- Sikkim – B. B. Lal
- Tamil Nadu – Kodardas Kalidas Shah (until 15 June), Mohan Lal Sukhadia (starting 15 June)
- Tripura – L. P. Singh
- Uttar Pradesh – Akbar Ali Khan
- West Bengal – Anthony Lancelot Dias

== Events ==
- National income - ₹918,117 million
- 2 March - The Rajan case, a famous case of Police brutality during the Emergency Period. The victim, P. Rajan, a final year Engineering student at Regional Engineering College, Calicut was arrested by police, taken to Kakkayam and allegedly tortured severely which led to his death. It is believed that his body was thrown into the Kakkayam Dam.
- 16 April – A family planning initiative involves the vasectomy of thousands of men and tubal ligation of women, either for payment or under coercive conditions. (The minimum age for marriage is also raised to 21 years for men and 18 years for women.) The son of then-Prime Minister Indira Gandhi, Sanjay Gandhi, is largely blamed for what turned out to be a failed program. A strong backlash against any initiative associated with family planning followed the highly controversial program, which continues (in part) into the 21st century.
- 10 June – George Fernandes arrested from Calcutta during the Emergency.
- 4 October - Congress leader and Beary social worker Kalladka Ismail assassinated by RSS affiliates in Kanara.
- 12 October - Indian Airlines Flight 171 crashed in Bombay killing all 95 on board.
- 6 November - Uttawar forced sterilisations: Mass vasectomy of nearly 800 men of Uttawar village, Palwal district, Haryana during India’s Emergency imposed by Indira Gandhi.
- 15 November – Subramanian Swamy was expelled from Rajya Sabha for his campaign against the Emergency in foreign countries.

== Law ==
The 42nd amendment Act, 1976, was enacted during the Emergency by the Indian National Congress government headed by Indira Gandhi.

== Births ==
=== January to June ===
- 29 February - Gagan Malik, Indian Television Actor
- 1 March - Shoeb Shakeel, Lawyer.
- 4 April – Simran Bagga, actress.
- 9 April – Rohit Gupta, writer and inventor.
- 9 April – Nithin Sathya, actor.
- 12 May - Vikas Sethi, Indian Television Actor (d.2024)
- 21 May – Aditi Gowitrikar, model, actress and physician.
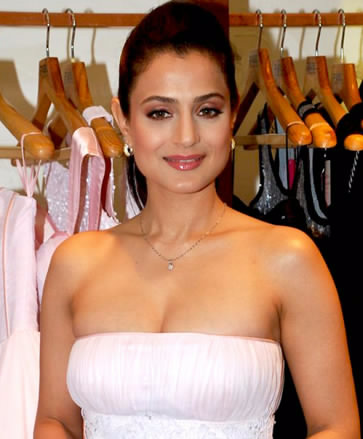
- Amisha Patel
  9 June – Amisha Patel, actress.
- 5 June – Rambha, actress.
- 7 June – Pandiraj, film director.
- 29 June – Saurabh Kalia, Military officer-KARGIL HERO. (d. 1998).

=== July to December ===
- 20 July – Debashish Mohanty, cricketer.
- 12 August – Baljit Singh Saini, field hockey player.
- 3 September – Vivek Oberoi, actor
- 5 September – Chandrabhan Singh Aakya, politician
- 16 September – Meena, actress.
- 19 September – Ishaa Koppikar, actress and model.
- 8 October – Jinnih Beels, Belgian politician
- 27 October – Pooja Batra, actress.
- 29 October – Raghava Lawrence, actor, choreographer, director.
- 14 November – Hemang Badani, cricketer.
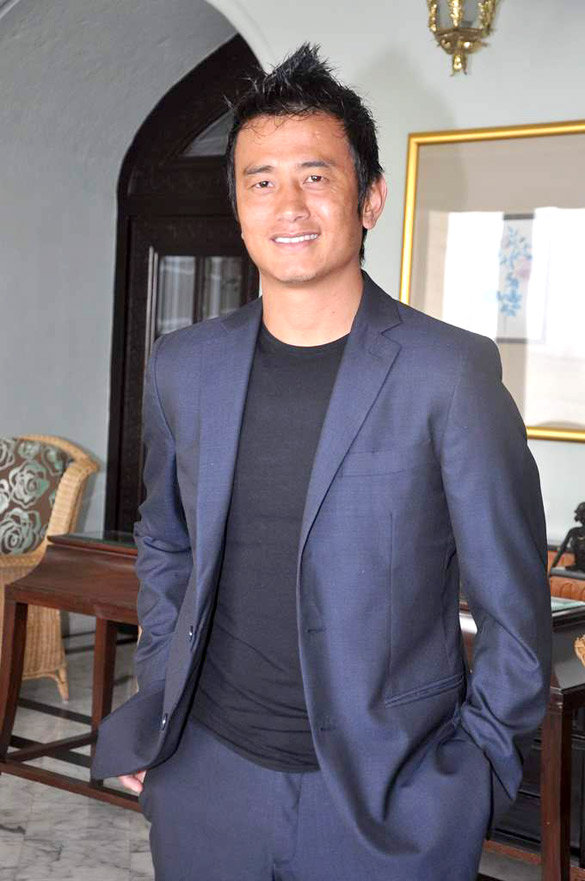
- Baichung Bhutia
  15 December – Baichung Bhutia, soccer player.

== Deaths ==
- 25 January – Swami Anand, Gandhi activist and writer (b. 1887)
- 2 March - P. Rajan, college student and victim of Police brutality (b. 1954)
- 28 July – T. Nagi Reddy, communist politician (b. 1917).
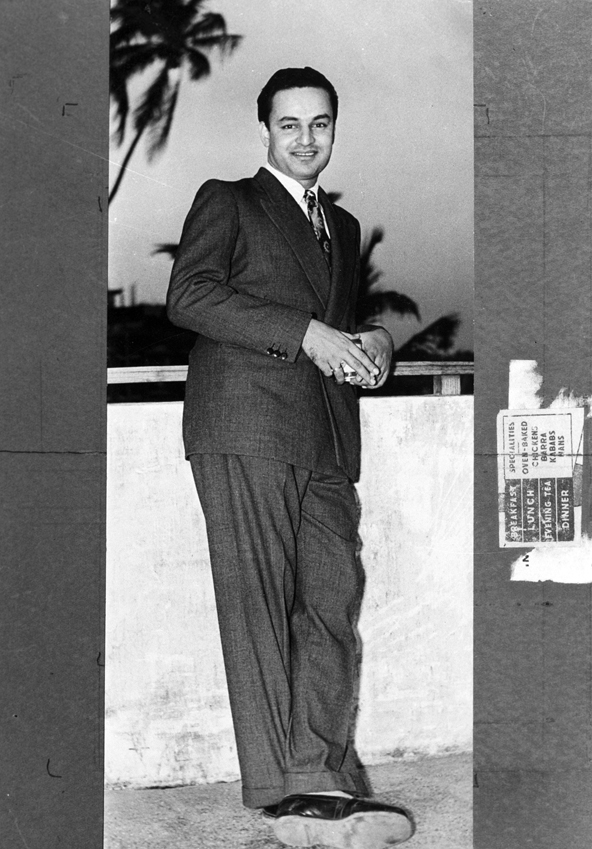
- Mukesh
  27 August – Mukesh, playback singer (b. 1923).
- 2 September – Vishnu Sakharam Khandekar, writer (b. 1898).

== See also ==
- List of Bollywood films of 1976
