= 1975 in India =

- Centuries: 18th; 19th; 20th; 21st
- Decades: 1950s; 1960s; 1970s; 1980s; 1990s
- See also: List of years in India; Timeline of Indian history

Events in the year 1975 in the Republic of India.

== Sports ==
- India won the Men's Hockey World Cup first time. It was held in Kuala Lumpur, Malaysia

== Incumbents ==
- President of India – Fakhruddin Ali Ahmed
- Prime Minister of India – Indira Gandhi
- Vice President of India – B.D. Jatti
- Chief Justice of India – Ajit Nath Ray

=== Governors ===
- Andhra Pradesh – Khandubhai Kasanji Desai (until 25 January), S. Obul Reddy (starting 25 January)
- Assam – L. P. Singh
- Bihar – Ramchandra Dhondiba Bhandare
- Gujarat – Kambanthodath Kunhan Vishwanatham
- Haryana – Birendra Narayan Chakraborty (until 27 March), Birendra Narayan Chakraborty (starting 27 March)
- Himachal Pradesh – S. Chakravarti
- Jammu and Kashmir – L. K. Jha
- Karnataka – Mohanlal Sukhadia (until 10 January), Uma Shankar Dikshit (starting 10 January)
- Kerala – N. N. Wanchoo
- Madhya Pradesh – Satya Narayan Sinha
- Maharashtra – Ali Yavar Jung
- Manipur – L.P. Singh
- Meghalaya – L.P. Singh
- Nagaland – L.P. Singh
- Odisha – Akbar Ali Khan
- Punjab – Mahendra Mohan Choudhry
- Rajasthan – Sardar Jogendra Singh
- Sikkim – Bipen Behari Lal (starting 18 May)
- Tamil Nadu – Kodardas Kalidas Shah
- Tripura – L. P. Singh
- Uttar Pradesh – Akbar Ali Khan
- West Bengal – Anthony Lancelot Dias

== Events ==
- National income - ₹852,124 million
- 19 January – The 6.8 M_{s} Kinnaur earthquake shook northern India with a maximum Mercalli intensity of IX (Violent). Forty-seven people were killed.
- 26 February - Sahitya Akademi recognizes Konkani language.
- 19 March – Indira Gandhi became the first Prime Minister of India to testify in a court. She appeared before Allahabad High Court in State of Uttar Pradesh v. Raj Narain case.
- 10 April - State Council (Sikkim) unanimously voted to abolish Monarchy of Chogyal and merge with India.
- 14 April - 1975 Sikkimese monarchy referendum held and obtained 97.75%approval.
- 19 April – The first Indian satellite, Aryabhata, goes into Earth's orbit.
- 21 April - Farakka Barrage across Ganges commissioned in West Bengal.
- 12 June – Justice Jagmohanlal Sinha declared PM Indira Gandhi's election to parliament from Rae Bareli (Lok Sabha constituency) in 1971 Indian general election null and void.
- 25 June – A state of emergency is declared by Prime Minister Indira Gandhi during which the press is censored and 100,000 are jailed.
- 27 December – The Chasnala mining disaster kills 375 people when an explosion in a coal mine causes catastrophic flooding.

== Law ==
- 25 April - Kerala Legislative Assembly passed the Kerala Scheduled Tribes (Restriction on Transfer of Lands and Restoration of Alienated Lands) Act, 1975, for restoring land rights to tribals.
- 15 May – 35th amendment of the Constitution of India ratifies statehood for Sikkim and deposing of Chogyal monarchy.

== Births ==
=== January to June ===
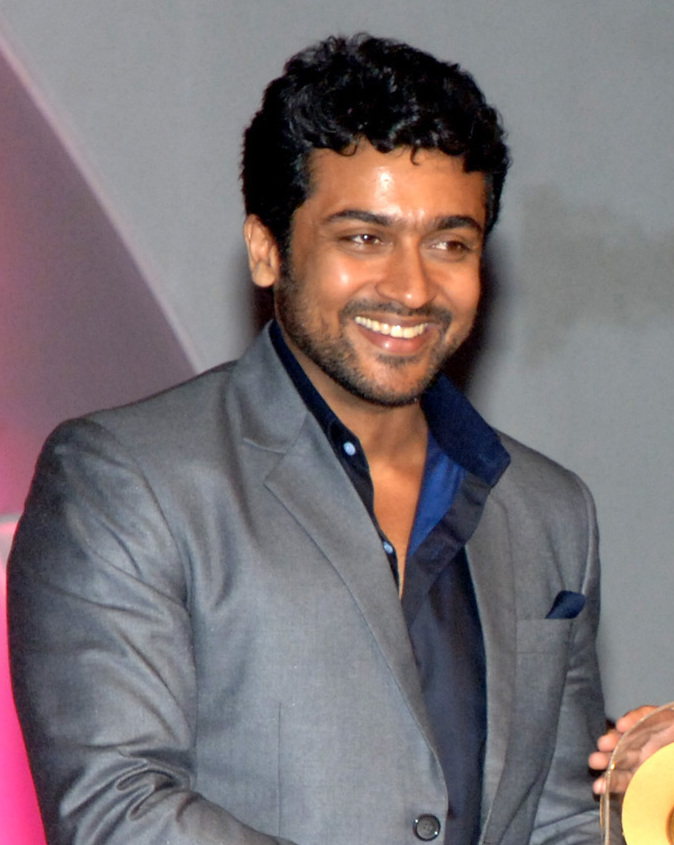
- Suriya
- 1 January
  - Sonali Bendre, actress
  - Kamaal Rashid Khan, actor and internet celebrity
- 2 January – Rupal Patel, actress
- 8 January – Harris Jayaraj, film composer.
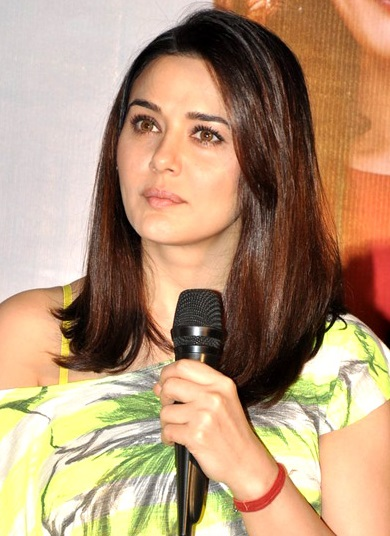
- Preity Zinta
  31 January – Preity Zinta, actress.
- 17 March – Puneeth Rajkumar, actor. (d. 2021).
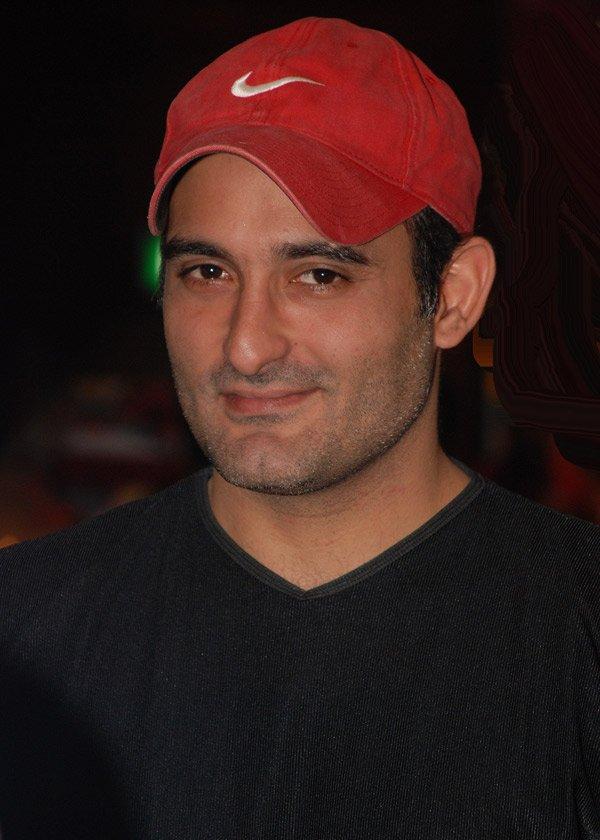
- Akshaye Khanna
  28 March – Akshaye Khanna, actor and son of Vinod Khanna.
- 17 May – Dinesh Nayak, field hockey player.
- 26 May – Abbas, actor.
- 4 June – Bhuvaneshwari, actress.
- 9 June – Amisha Patel, actress.
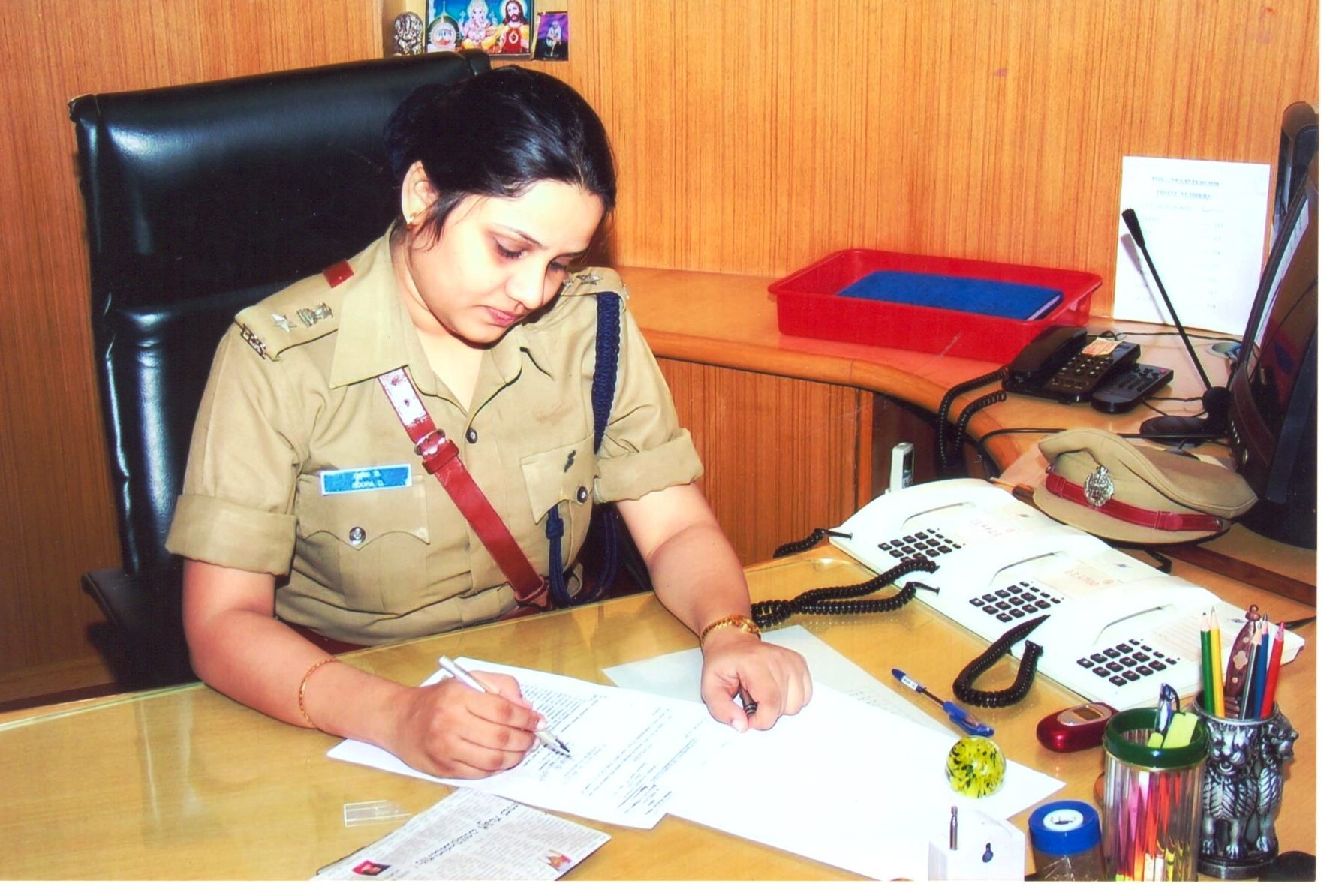
- ROOPA IPS
  8 June – Shilpa Shetty, actress.
- 25 June – Manoj Kumar Pandey, Military personnel. (d. 1999).

=== July to December ===
- 6 July – Jeevan (Tamil actor)
- 12 July – D. Roopa, Police Service officer.
- 23 July – Suriya, actor.
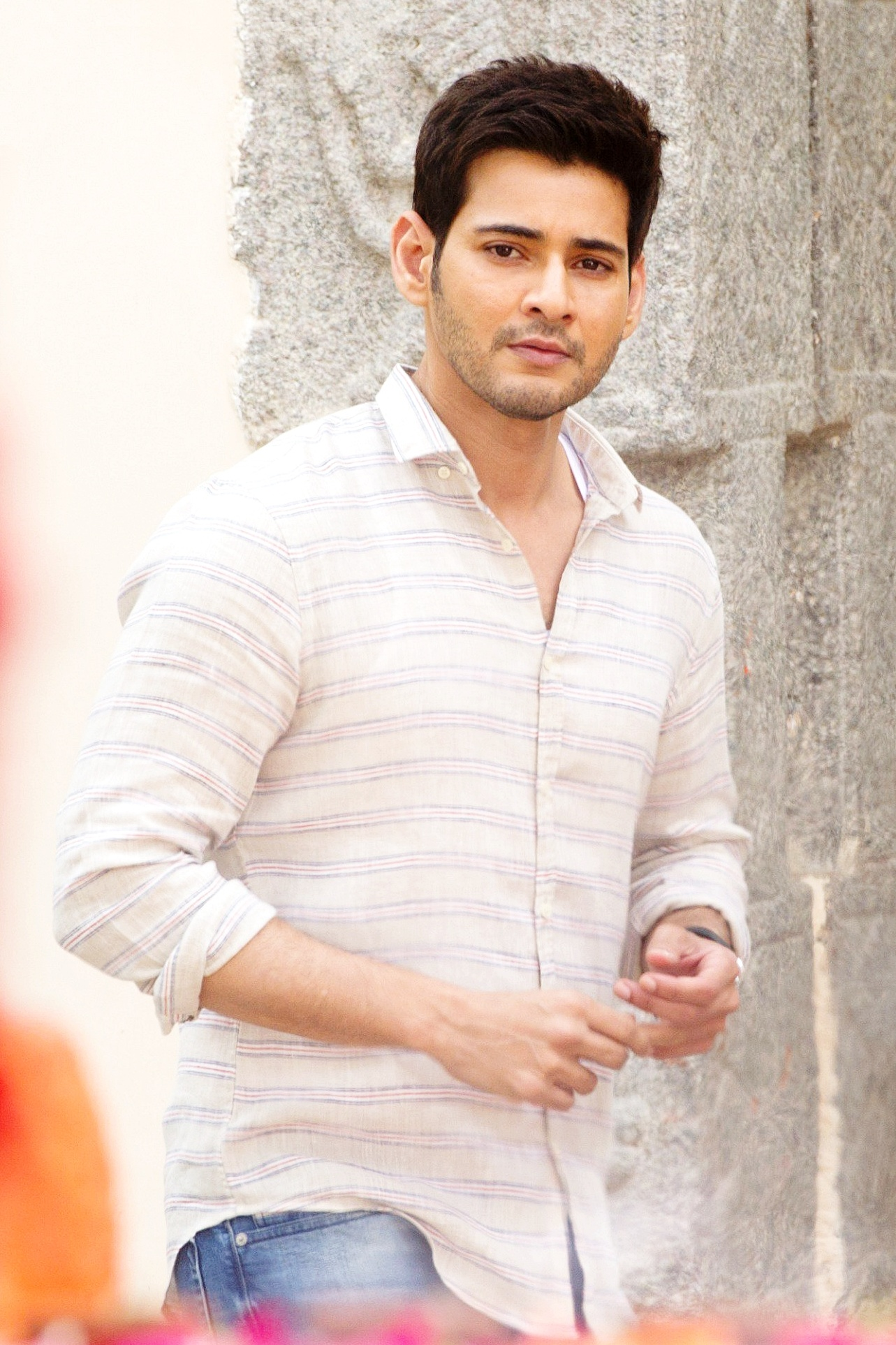
- Mahesh Babu
  9 August – Mahesh Babu, actor.
- 16 September – Pushkar Singh Dhami, Politician and 10th Chief Minister of Uttarakhand
- 28 August – Eijaz Khan, actor.
- 28 August – Anuj Nayyar, Military officer. (d. 1999)
- 16 October – Rajeev Khandelwal, actor.
- 7 November – Venkat Prabhu, film director and actor.
- 11 November – Diwakar Pundir, actor.
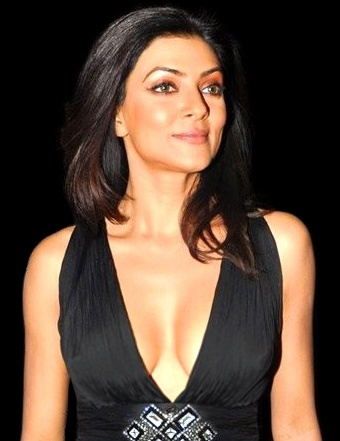
- Sushmita Sen
  19 November – Sushmita Sen, Miss Universe 1994, actress.
- 9 December – Priya Gill, actress.
- 14 December – Sukhbir Singh Gill, field hockey player. (d. 2024)
- 15 December – Siddhaanth Vir Surryavanshi, actor (d. 2022)
- 21 December – Srijato, poet

== Deaths ==
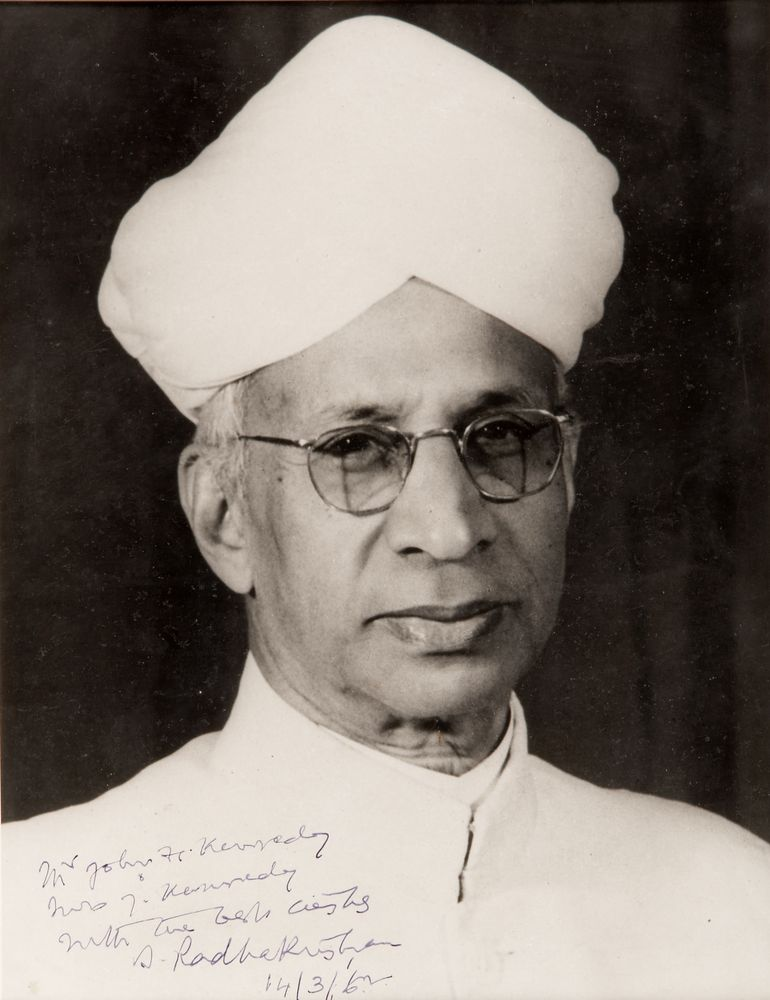
Dr. Sarvepalli Radhakrishnan

- 25 March – Deiva Zivarattinam, politician (b. 1894)
- 17 April – Sarvepalli Radhakrishnan, philosopher and statesman, first Vice President of India and second President of India (b. 1888).
- 16 May – Gunabai Gadekar, social activist (b. 1906)
- 14 July – Madan Mohan, composer (b. 1924)
- 13 September – Mudicondan Venkatarama Iyer, Carnatic singer and musicologist (b. 1897)

== See also ==
- List of Bollywood films of 1975
