= Premjibhai Assar =

Indian politician

Premjibhai Ranchhoddas Assar was an Indian politician and member of the Bharatiya Jana Sangh. Assar was a member of the 2nd Lok Sabha from the Ratnagiri constituency in Maharashtra. He was of the Indian National Congress from 1929 to 1933.
