= Darez Ahamed =

Indian Administrative Service officer

Health Secretary Guidance Tamil Nadu Government of Tami Nadu, India

Personal details
- Born: 5 February 1977 (age 49) Manjeri, Kerala, India
- Education: London School of Economics; Kasturba Medical College; LBSNAA, Mussourie
- Occupation: IAS Officer; Medical Doctor

Darez Ahamed is an Indian doctor turned bureaucrat who joined the Indian Administrative Service in 2005. As of Feb 2025, he is currently serving as the Managing Director and Chief Executive Officer of Guidance Tamil Nadu. Guidance Tamil Nadu is the nodal investment promotion agency of the Government of Tamil Nadu. Established in 1992, it plays a central role in attracting and supporting investments across sectors in the state of Tamil Nadu.He was honoured by Prime Minister for Excellence in Public Administration for the year 2012–13.

== Education ==
Ahamed was born on 2 February 1977 in Manjeri, Kerala. He graduated in medicine at Kasturba Medical College, Mangalore and in 2005 joined the Indian Administrative Service.

== Career ==
Ahamed got trained as Assistant Collector under Collector T. Udhayachandran in Madurai District. During his training, he was involved in the conduct of Panchayat elections as Pappapatti and other villages, and contributed as a case study on good governance.

He served as Sub-Collector in Devakottai Sub-division of Sivaganga District, Additional Collector (Development) in Madurai and Krishnagiri Districts, Joint Commissioner (Commercial Taxes) - Chennai North Division, and Deputy Commissioner (Works) of Chennai Corporation. In 2011 he became District Collector of Perambalur district. He took a number of initiatives to develop Perambalur District, which had been having a low and declining per capita income. Later he served as the Mission Director of the National Health Mission Tamil Nadu.

== Achievements ==
Government of India nominated him to undergo special training in Urban Management the Lee Kuan Yew School of Public Policy, National University of Singapore. He was awarded the Indian Prime Minister’s Awards for Excellence in Public Administration for the year 2012-13 presented by Prime Minister Narendra Modi on the National Civil Services Day, 21 April 2015 for his work in combating female infanticide and improving sex ratio at birth. His initiatives to combat child marriage drew criticism from certain Islamic political groups. The children went on to continue their studies and performed well in the board exams.

Earlier, his services had been recognized by the Government of Tamil Nadu with awards conferred by the then Chief Minister J.Jayalalithaa during the Collectors' Conferences 2012 and 2013 for Efficient Disposal of Chief Minister's Special Cell Petitions, and best performing Collector in the health sector (2012), and e-governance, and special initiatives for the differently-abled (2013) respectively.

He was recognized as a fearless and fair officer by The Telegraph for his recruitment for government posts in 2012.

== See also ==
- Neeraj Mittal
- Civil Services of India
