= Suchitra Singh =

Indian cricketer

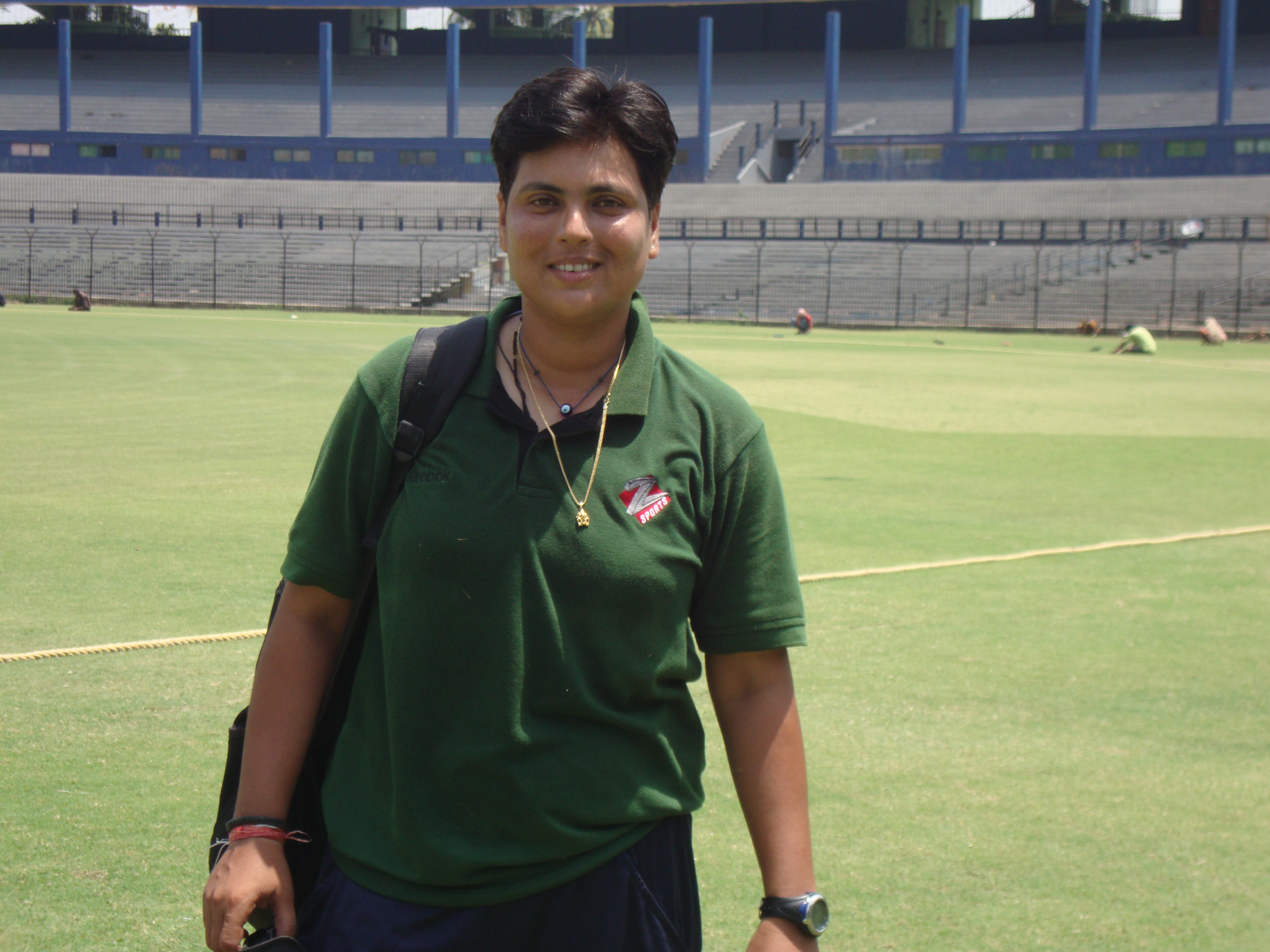
- Suchitra in March 2010

Personal information
- Born: 31 January 1977 (age 49); Kamrup, Assam, India
- Batting: Right-handed
- Bowling: Right-arm off break

Domestic team information
- Years: Team
- 2007–2011: Assam

Career statistics
Competition	List A	Twenty20
Matches	12	16
Runs scored	170	136
Batting average	14.16	12.36
100s/50s	0/1	0/0
Top score	59	29*
Balls bowled	393	66
Wickets	7	4
Bowling average	24.71	15.00
5 wickets in innings	0	0
10 wickets in match	0	0
Best bowling	4/14	2/6
Catches/stumpings	2/–	2/–
- Source: CricketArchive, 20 April 2020

Suchitra Singh (born 31 January 1977) is a former Indian cricketer. Singh was a right-handed batsman who bowled right-arm off break. She was born in Kamrup, Assam.

Singh made her debut for Assam in the 2007–08 Senior Women's One Day League against Bengal. She played a further ten matches for the state from 2007 to 2011. She also represented East Zone in one match in the 2007–08 Inter Zone Women's One Day Competition. Across the 12 women's limited over matches she averaged 14.16 with the bat and took seven wickets.

Singh played her debut Women's Twenty20 match for Assam against Tripura in the 2009–10 Senior Women's T20 League. She played further 15 matches over the 2009–10 and 2010–11 seasons finishing with a batting average of 12.36 and taking four wickets.
