= CISF conflict at Bokaro =

1979 event involving the Central Industrial Security Force

A Central Industrial Security Force (CISF) Association conflict took place at Bokaro, India on 27 June 1979.

The members of the CISF Unit at Bokaro had formed an all-India association in March 1979 and Sadanand Jha, was elected as its General Secretary. Thereafter, a country wide agitation was carried on for recognition of the said association. In June 1979 some of the members of the said association were called upon to meet the Home Minister at Delhi. A delegation of the said association went to Delhi. While there; they staged a demonstration. Some of the demonstrators, including Sadanand Jha, were arrested, but subsequently released on bail. At Bokaro Steel Plant, the agitation which was going on and the situation aggravated from 27 May 1979.

Whereas a large group of members of CISF Unit, Bokaro Steel Ltd, Bokaro took out processions and raised slogans such as INQULAB ZINDABAD, VARDI VARDI BHAI BHAI LARKE LENGE PAI PAI, JO HAMSE TAKRAYEGE CHOOR CHOOR HO JAYEGA and PUNJAB KI JEET HAMARI HAI AAB CISF KI BARI HAI, participating in the gherao of Supervisory Officers, participating hunger strike and 'dharna' near the Quarter Guard and Administrative Building of CISF Unit, Bokaro Steel Ltd. since 27 May 1979 in violation of the provisions of CISF Act, 1968.

Out of 1900 persons belonging to CISF Unit, Bokaro Steel Plant, Bokaro about 1000 persons participated in the processions and violent demonstrations. The said agitation and the violent activity reached a very serious proportion in the last week of June, 1979 with the result that Army had to be called by the State Authorities on 23.6.1979, so as to restore normalcy in the area. The State Government had also deployed 9 Magistrates to assist the Army authorities as also the CRPF for restoring the normal conditions at the Bokaro Steel Plant.

On 24/6/1979, on seeing the arrival of the Army, the agitators started making preparations for armed resistance by putting up sand bags, flood lights and barricades in the CISF Lines. They had gained the control of CISF Lines and the Officers were not allowed to have any access to the Lines or to other ranks of CISF.

On 25/6/1979, the Army along with 9 Magistrates took up positions round the CISF Lines in the early hours and called upon the agitators to give up charge of the Armory. In spite of giving repeated warnings by the authorities to give up charge of the Armory, the agitators did not give up arms, but, instead, resorted to violence. The agitators started firing at 0320 hours at the Army. The Army returned the fire. The said exchange of fire continued for 3 hours before the Army could spell out the violent retaliation of the agitators. The said violent exchange of fire resulted in the instant death of one Army Major and 2 more Army personnel were also killed as a result of firing by the CISF personnel. It may also be stated that there were 22 or 29 deaths in the course of the said pitched battle, which went on for three hours between the violent armed agitators and the Army.
