= Jagannath Kaushal =

Indian politician (1915–2001)

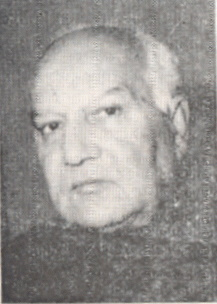

Member of Parliament, Lok Sabha
- In office 1980–1989
- Preceded by: Krishan Kant
- Succeeded by: Harmohan Dhawan
- Constituency: Chandigarh

9th Governor of Bihar
- In office 16 June 1976–31 January 1979
- Preceded by: Ramchandra Dhondiba Bhandare
- Succeeded by: K.B.N. Singh

Member of Parliament, Rajya Sabha
- In office 1952-1964
- Constituency: Punjab

Personal details
- Born: 23 April 1915 Patiala, Punjab, British India
- Died: 31 May 2001 (aged 86) Chandigarh, India
- Party: Indian National Congress
- Spouse: Kanta Kaushal
- Children: 3 sons and 6 daughters

Jagannath Kaushal (23 April 1915 – 31 May 2001) was an Indian National Congress politician and Law Minister in the Government of India from 1982 to 1985. He studied law at Panjab University, Lahore, in 1936 and started legal practice at Patiala in 1937. Though he was selected as the District and Sessions Judge in 1947, he resigned from the post in 1949 after the State was merged with PEPSU, and returned to legal practice.

He was elected to the 1st Rajya Sabha in 1952, and was designated as a Senior Advocate of the Supreme Court in 1954. Following the merger of PEPSU with Punjab in 1956, he shifted to Chandigarh and commenced practice at the Punjab and Haryana High Court. He was also elected president of the Punjab and Haryana High Court Bar Association in 1962.

After his retirement from the Rajya Sabha in 1964, Kaushal was appointed the Advocate-General of Punjab. In 1966, he was appointed an Additional Judge of the Punjab and Haryana High Court, but he returned to the Bar nine months after resigning from the post.

In 1967, he became the Advocate-General of Punjab and the Haryana Advocate-General a little later. During that period, he had the opportunity of conducting Indira Gandhi’s election petition in the Supreme Court when she was unseated.

An expert in civil and criminal law, he was the Governor of Bihar between 1976 and 1979. Thereafter, he resigned to resume his practice. In 1980, he was elected to the Lok Sabha from Chandigarh and remained the Union Law Minister from 1982 to 1985. He also ran successfully for Congress, winning his local seat again in 1985.

A member of the Syndicate of Panjab University for over 25 years, Kaushal was the chairman of the Privileges Committee of the Lok Sabha. As the Law Minister, he attended the final session of the UN Conference on Laws of Seas held in Jamaica and signed the treaty on behalf of India. In the Punjab and Haryana High Court, the work was suspended on the day he died as a mark of respect.

== See also ==
- List of governors of Bihar
