= Prabhudas Patwari =

Prabhudas Patwari (1909–1985) was an Indian lawyer, community activist, freedom fighter, Gandhian follower and vegetarianism activist.

== Biography ==
Patwari was governor of the Indian state of Tamil Nadu between 1977 and 1980, and in 1978 was described as "very popular in the Tamil countryside." He championed and brought about several policy level changes to help the poor and helped start institutions to help marginalized and abused women and prevent child marriage both in his home state of Gujarat and as Governor of the state of Tamil Nadu. He was a staunch Gandhian who joined the Quit India Movement in response to Mahatma Gandhi's call to action to the youth of India and a champion of animals and a staunch vegetarian who refused to serve meat in the Tamil Nadu Raj Bhavan on the Gandhian principle of non-violence. He often fought pro-bono cases for the vulnerable in society including laborers and abused women and was deeply involved in community service and engaged with the Ahmedabad Gandhi Ashram community. He was a believer in Hindu–Muslim unity and often trying to help both sides and unite them during religious riots and was respected by both communities.

An advocate of abstinence, he was a teetotaler who stayed active as an anti-alcohol campaigner in his home state of Gujarat until his death. He was put in jail under Indira Gandhi's administration for his vocal protest against the Emergency.

Prabhudas Patwari's wife, Savita Patwari (b. 1915) died in December 2005, at the age of 90, in Ahmedabad.
