= Sharda Mukherjee =

Indian socialite and politician

Sharada Mukherjee
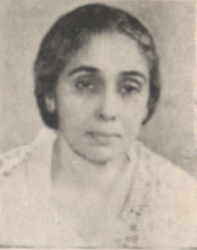

5th Governor of Gujarat
- In office 14 August 1978 – 6 August 1983
- Chief Minister: Babubhai Patel; Madhav Singh Solanki
- Preceded by: K. K. Viswanathan
- Succeeded by: K. M. Chandy

10th Governor of Andhra Pradesh
- In office 5 May 1977 – 14 August 1978
- Chief Minister: Jalagam Vengala Rao; Marri Chenna Reddy
- Preceded by: B. J. Divan
- Succeeded by: K. C. Abraham

Member of Parliament, Lok Sabha
- In office 2 April 1962 – 3 March 1967
- Prime Minister: Jawaharlal Nehru; Gulzarilal Nanda; Lal Bahadur Shastri; Indira Gandhi
- Preceded by: Premjibhai Assar
- In office 3 March 1967 – 18 March 1971
- Prime Minister: Indira Gandhi
- Succeeded by: Shantaram Peje
- Constituency: Ratnagiri, Maharashtra

Personal details
- Born: 24 February 1919
- Died: 2007
- Party: Indian National Congress
- Spouse: Subroto Mukerjee

Sharada Mukherjee (24 February 1919 – 2007) was an Indian socialite and politician who was member of Lok Sabha in 1960s, and later served as Governor of the states of Andhra Pradesh and Gujarat.

== Biography ==
Sharada was born into a Maharashtrian family as Sharada Pandit on 24 February 1919. Her paternal uncle Ranjit S Pandit was married to Vijayalakshmi Pandit, India's first Prime Minister Jawaharlal Nehru's sister. Her mother Saraswatibai Pandit's sister was the legendary actress and film personality Durga Khote. She met Subroto Mukerjee, who became the first Indian Air Chief Marshal later and belonged to one of the most distinguished families of Bengal in 1937 in Mumbai. They got married in 1939 and had a son. After the untimely death of her husband in 1960, she entered politics. She was member of 3rd and 4th Lok Sabha, 1962 to 1971, from Ratnagiri (Lok Sabha constituency) of Maharashtra, representing Congress Party. She did not contest 1971 election.

Sharada Mukherjee was governor of Andhra Pradesh from May 1977 to August 1978, and governor of Gujarat from 1978 to 1983. She died in 2007.

Government offices
Preceded by K. K. Viswanathan	Governor of Gujarat; 14 August 1978 – 6 August 1983	Succeeded by K. M. Chandy
Preceded by B. J. Diwan	Governor of Andhra Pradesh; 5 May 1977 – 14 August 1978	Succeeded by K. C. Abraham
Preceded by Premjibhai Assar	Member of Parliament, Lok Sabha; 2 April 1962 – 18 March 1971	Succeeded by Shantaram Peje
