= K. K. Viswanathan =

Indian politician

Kambanthodath Vishwanathan

Governor of Gujarat
- In office 4 April 1973 – 13 August 1978

Personal details
- Born: 4 November 1914 Kerala, India
- Died: 17 August 1992 (aged 77)

Kambanthodath Kunhan Viswanathan (4 November 1914 – 17 or 18 August 1992) was governor of the Indian state of Gujarat.Viswanathan was born in Mattancheri, Cochin on the 4th of November 1914 to an Ezhava family.

== Education ==
He was educated at St. Thomas College, Trichur, Maharaja's College, Earnakulam and Law College, Trivandrum. He took his bachelor's degree in Law from the Madras University in 1938 and started his legal practice in Cochin the same year. Simultaneously, he took up the management of a High School there and also evinced great interest in trade union work.

== Political Career ==
Viswanathan was one of the founders of a major Port-workers' Union by the name of Cochin Thuramukha Thozhilali Union. Afterwards, he joined the Cochin Praja Mandal, a constituent of the All India States People's Conference, which carried on in the princely State the policies and programmes of the Indian National Congress. In 1948, he was elected to the Cochin Legislative Council on the Praja Mandal ticket and, on the merger of Travancore and Cochin in 1949, he automatically became a Member of the integrated State Assembly.

Viswanathan, however, resigned from the State Assembly in 1950 along with his other colleagues in response to a call from the Cochin Praja Mandal to that effect. He then turned his attention to welfare activities among the masses and soon came to be known as a leading social worker as also an astute Congressman in and around the Cochin region.

In 1957, when the EMS-led Communist Ministry was installed in office after the first general elections, after the formation of Kerala State in November 1956, Viswanathan was also a Member of the Assembly and was eventually elected as Secretary of the Kerala Congress Legislative Party. He worked for the cause of the weaker sections and advocated for several progressive measures and legislations for the amelioration of their condition. By then he had become one amongst front-ranking Parliamentarians in Kerala and gained recognition even of members of Opposition parties as an expert in land reforms. During this period he decided to give up even his lucrative law practice in order to be able to devote his full-time and care to the party work.

Viswanathan was returned to the State Assembly with a huge margin of votes when fresh elections were held in 1959 after the exit of the Communist Ministry headed by E.M.S. Namboodiripad as a result of the liberation struggle launched by the people against it. He lent his powerful support and guidance first to the Coalition Government and later to the Congress Ministry in bringing about various land reform measures in the State.

Vishwanathan edited a Malayalam Weekly named The Republic and ably projected Congress policies and programmes which gained acceptance and support from the common people. He was the Secretary of the State Congress Legislative Party during 1957-60 and 1960–64 and the General Secretary of the KPCC from 1966 to 1969. The first ever AICC session held in Kerala was successfully organized by him in Ernakulam in 1966. After the split in Congress ranks in 1969, he, as the Convener of the ad hoc KPCC, was responsible in establishing the Congress Party on strong foundations. He was later elected as President of the KPCC in 1970, followed by his re-election to the same post in December, 1972.

In addition to his Parliamentary work, Viswanathan was Chairman of the State Evaluation Committee of Programmes for the Scheduled Castes and the Scheduled Tribes during the first and the Second Five Year Plans; was a member on the Kerala State Food Advisory Committee, the Public Health Advisory Committee, the High Power Committee on Land Reforms, the Estimates Committee, the Assurance Committee and the Rules Committee. He organized an All India exhibition during the Centenary of Narayana Guru in 1956.

As president of various important trade unions, he actively participated in several labor welfare programmes for nearly two decades. Besides, he played a prominent role in the adult franchise movement as a pre-condition to the induction of Responsible Government in the Cochin State.

During his tenure in the Congress, Viswanathan took a very keen interest in reorganizing the KPCC and secured far better representation on it for the Harijans, minority communities and the youth which enhanced the party's involvement in the lives of all categories of people in the State, lending it a greater democratic touch. He also helped opening of hotels and restaurants managed by the Harijans. He played a notable role in raising and developing the Congress Seva Dal into a 25,000 strong trained volunteer organization.

He took over as the Governor of Gujarat on April 4, 1973, and continued to serve Gujarat till August 13, 1978. He later served as the president of SNDP Yogam. He continued in office till his death on August 17, 1992, aged 78.

== Personal life ==
During his public life in Kerala, Viswanathan witnessed political and social reforms. He was regarded by his junior colleagues as a friend, philosopher and guide. He was also respected by members of opposition parties for his sincerity and personal qualities.
