= K. C. Abraham =

Indian politician (1899–1986)

11th Governor of Andhra Pradesh
- In office 1978–1983
- Preceded by: Sharada Mukherjee
- Succeeded by: Thakur Ram Lal

Personal details
- Spouse: Elizabeth
- Occupation: Governor of Andhra Pradesh

Kochakkan Chacko Abraham (20 January 1899 in Cochin, Kerala – 14 March 1986) was the Governor of Andhra Pradesh between 15 August 1978 – 15 August 1983. He belonged to the Indian National Congress.

== Early life ==
He was born in Cochin, Kerala on 20 January 1899. He has a bachelor's degree and worked for 30 years as a teacher, and headmaster.

== Career ==
He was a Member of Travancore Cochin Legislative Assembly (1954–56). He was the 1st and 2nd KLA Legislator from Njarakkal-Congress. He entered active politics quite late, after his retirement as a school headmaster. He was a member of the Congress Working Committee (CWC) at the time of the great split in 1969. With the 21 member committee split into 10 pro-Syndicate and 10 pro-Indira group, it was K.C. Abraham who played a mediator role to bring the two groups together though he was very much pro-Syndicate. Finally he stood by his pro-Syndicate conviction which resulted in the expulsion of Indira Gandhi from the Indian National Congress.

== Personal life ==
He was married to Elizabeth and had a son.
