= Raghukul Tilak =

Governor of Rajasthan

Raghukul Tilak (7 January 1900 – 25 December 1989) was a former Governor of Rajasthan, an office he held from 1977 to 1981.

== Early life ==
Tilak was born on 7 January 1900 at Meerut, Uttar Pradesh, India. He completed MA in history in 1924.
