= Ganpatrao Devji Tapase =

Indian politician and governor

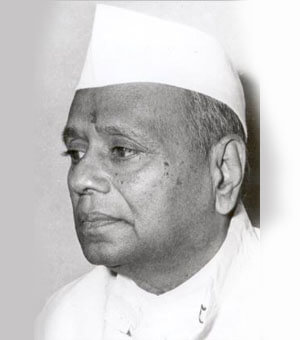

Governor of Haryana
- In office 28 February 1980 – 13 June 1984
- Appointed by: Neelam Sanjiva Reddy
- Preceded by: Surjit Singh Sandhawalia (acting)
- Succeeded by: S. M. H. Burney

Governor of Uttar Pradesh
- In office 2 October 1977 – 27 February 1980
- Appointed by: Neelam Sanjiva Reddy
- Preceded by: Marri Chenna Reddy
- Succeeded by: Chandeshwar Prasad Narayan Singh

Member of Parliament, Rajya Sabha
- In office 3 April 1962 – 2 April 1968
- Constituency: Maharashtra

Personal details
- Born: 30 October 1909
- Died: 3 October 1992 (aged 82)
- Party: Indian National Congress

Ganpatrao Devji Tapase (30 October 1909–3 October 1992, Mumbai) was an Indian politician, an Indian independence activist and later a leader of the Indian National Congress political party in Maharashtra.

He had studied in Fergusson College and Law College Pune. He was elected to the Bombay Legislative Assembly in 1946 and 1952 from Satara district. He was a member of the Rajya Sabha from 3 April 1962 to 2 April 1968. He was the Governor of Uttar Pradesh state from 2 October 1977 to 27 February 1980 and the Governor of Haryana state from 28 February 1982 to 14 June 1984.

== Works ==
- From Mudhouse to Rajbhavan: Autobiography of a Governor (1983)
