= List of governors of Nagaland =

Heads of state Nagaland, India

Governor of Nagaland
- Emblem of Nagaland

- Flag of India

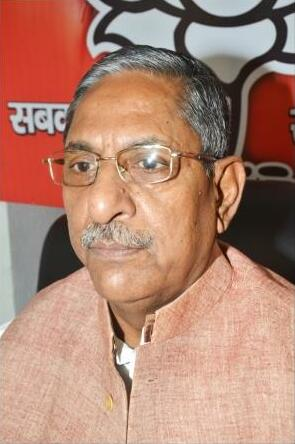
- Incumbent; Nand Kishore Yadav since 13 March 2026
- Style: His Excellency
- Residence: Lok Bhavan; Kohima
- Appointer: President of India
- Term length: At the pleasure of the president
- Inaugural holder: Vishnu Sahay, ICS (Retd.)
- Formation: 1 December 1963; 62 years ago
- Website: lokbhavan.nagaland.gov.in

The state of Nagaland is on the border with Burma.

The Governor of Nagaland is the head of state of Nagaland. The governor is appointed by the president of India. The current governor is Nand Kishore Yadav since 13 March 2026.

== Powers and functions ==
The governor enjoys many different types of powers:

- Executive powers related to administration, appointments and removals,
- Legislative powers related to lawmaking and the state legislature, that is Vidhan Sabha or Vidhan Parishad, and
- Discretionary powers to be carried out according to the discretion of the governor.

== Oath ==
I, A. B., do swear in the name of God/solemly affirm that I will faithfully execute the office of Governor (or discharge the functions of the Governor) of Nagaland and will to the best of my ability preserve, protect and defend the Constitution and the law and that I will devote myself to the service and well-being of the people of Nagaland.}}

== List ==
Legend

- ^{†} Died in office
- ^{§} Transferred
- ^{‡} Resigned/removed

Color key

- indicates acting/additional charge
- indicates position vacant

#	Portrait	Name (born – died)	Home state/ UT	Tenure in office			Appointer (President)
#	Portrait	Name (born – died)	Home state/ UT	From	To	Time in office	Appointer (President)
1		Vishnu Sahay; ICS (Retd) (1901–1989)	Uttar Pradesh	1 December 1963 (Note: Concurrently also served as the Governor of Assam)	16 April 1968	4 years, 137 days	Sarvepalli Radhakrishnan
2		Braj Kumar Nehru; ICS (Retd) (1909–2001)	Uttar Pradesh	17 April 1968 (Note: Concurrently also served as the Governor of Assam (1968–1973); and as the Governor of Meghalaya, Manipur, and Tripura (1972–1973))	18 September 1973	5 years, 154 days	Zakir Husain
3		Lallan Prasad Singh; ICS (Retd) (1912–1998)	Bihar	19 September 1973 (Note: Concurrently also served as the Assam, Meghalaya, Manipur, and Tripura)	9 August 1981	7 years, 324 days	V. V. Giri
4		S. M. H. Burney; IAS (Retd) (1924–2014)	Uttar Pradesh	10 August 1981 (Note: Concurrently also served as the Governor of Manipur and Tripura)	12 June 1984^{[§]} (Note: Transferred as the Governor of Haryana)	2 years, 307 days	Neelam Sanjiva Reddy
5		General; K. V. Krishna Rao (Retd); PVSM (1923–2016)	Andhra Pradesh	13 June 1984	19 July 1989^{[§]} (Note: Transferred as the Governor of Jammu and Kashmir)	5 years, 36 days	Zail Singh
6		Gopal Singh (1917–1990)	Punjab	20 July 1989	3 May 1990^{[‡]}	287 days	Ramaswamy Venkataraman
7		M. M. Thomas (1916–1996)	Kerala	9 May 1990	12 April 1992^{[‡]}	1 year, 339 days	Ramaswamy Venkataraman
8		Lokanath Misra (1921–2009) (Additional Charge)	Orissa	13 April 1992	1 October 1993	1 year, 171 days	Ramaswamy Venkataraman
9		Lieutenant General; V. K. Nayar (Retd); PVSM SM (d. 2015) (Additional Charge)	–	2 October 1993	4 August 1994	306 days	Shankar Dayal Sharma
10		Oudh Narayan Shrivastava; IPS (Retd) (born 1935)	Madhya Pradesh	23 December 1994	11 November 1996^{[§]} (Note: Transferred as the Governor of Manipur)	4 years, 343 days	Shankar Dayal Sharma
11		Om Prakash Sharma; IPS (Retd)	Punjab	12 November 1996	27 January 2002	5 years, 76 days	Shankar Dayal Sharma
12		Shyamal Datta; IPS (Retd) (born 1941)	West Bengal	28 January 2002	2 February 2007	5 years, 5 days	K. R. Narayanan
13		Kateekal Sankaranarayanan (1932–2022)	Kerala	3 February 2007	28 July 2009^{[§]} (Note: Transferred as the Governor of Jharkhand)	2 years, 175 days	A. P. J. Abdul Kalam
14		Gurbachan Jagat; IPS (Retd) (born 1942) (Additional Charge)	Chandigarh	28 July 2009	14 Oct 2009	78 days	Pratibha Patil
15		Nikhil Kumar; IPS (Retd) (born 1941)	Bihar	15 October 2009	20 March 2013^{[§]} (Note: Transferred as the Governor of Kerala)	3 years, 156 days	Pratibha Patil
16		Ashwani Kumar; IPS (Retd) (1950–2020)	Himachal Pradesh	21 March 2013	1 July 2014^{[‡]}	1 year, 102 days	Pranab Mukherjee
17		Krishan Kant Paul; IPS (Retd) (born 1948) (Additional Charge)	Chandigarh	2 July 2014	19 July 2014 (Note: Although his successor- designate, Vakkom Purushothaman was appointed, he was never sworn in, so Paul continued till 19th July 2014)	17 days	Pranab Mukherjee
18		Padmanabha Acharya (1931–2023)	Karnataka	19 July 2014	31 July 2019	5 years, 12 days	Pranab Mukherjee
19		R. N. Ravi; IPS (Retd) (born 1952)	Bihar	1 August 2019	17 September 2021^{[§]} (Note: Transferred as the Governor of Tamil Nadu)	2 years, 16 days	Ram Nath Kovind
20		Jagdish Mukhi (born 1942) (Additional Charge)	National Capital Territory of Delhi	17 September 2021	19 February 2023	1 year, 155 days	Ram Nath Kovind
21		La. Ganesan (1945–2025)	Tamil Nadu	20 February 2023	15 August 2025^{[†]}	2 years, 176 days	Droupadi Murmu
–	–	Position Vacant	–	15 August 2025	25 August 2025	10 days	–
22		Ajay Kumar Bhalla; IAS (Retd) (born 1960) (Additional Charge)	Punjab	25 August 2025	13 March 2026	200 days	Droupadi Murmu
23		Nand Kishore Yadav (born 1953)	Bihar	13 March 2026	Incumbent	214 days	Droupadi Murmu

== See also ==
- Nagaland
- Governors of India
- Chief Minister of Nagaland
