= Jaisukhlal Hathi =

Indian politician (1909–1982)

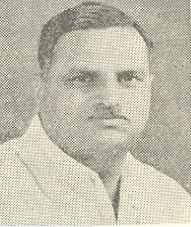

10th Governor of Punjab
- In office 24 September 1977 – 26 August 1981
- Chief Minister: Parkash Singh Badal; Darbara Singh
- Preceded by: Mahendra Mohan Choudhry
- Succeeded by: Aminuddin Ahmad Khan

4th Governor of Haryana
- In office 14 August 1976 – 23 September 1977
- Chief Minister: Banarsi Das Gupta; Devi Lal
- Preceded by: Ranjit Singh Narula
- Succeeded by: Harcharan Singh Brar

Minister of Labour and Rehabilitation
- In office 13 March 1967 – 15 November 1969
- Prime Minister: Indira Gandhi
- Preceded by: Jagjivan Ram
- Succeeded by: Jagjivan Ram

Minister of State, Ministry of Defence
- In office 13 November 1966 – 13 March 1967
- Prime Minister: Indira Gandhi
- Preceded by: A. M. Thomas
- Succeeded by: Bali Ram Bhagat

Minister of Defence Supplies, Ministry of Defence
- In office 24 January 1966 – 13 November 1966
- Prime Minister: Indira Gandhi

Minister of State, Ministry of Home Affairs
- In office 24 January 1966 – 13 November 1966
- Prime Minister: Indira Gandhi
- Succeeded by: Vidya Charan Shukla
- In office 11 January 1966 – 24 January 1966
- Prime Minister: Gulzarilal Nanda (Interim)
- In office 9 June 1964 – 11 January 1966
- Prime Minister: Lal Bahadur Shastri
- In office 27 May 1964 – 9 June 1964
- Prime Minister: Gulzarilal Nanda
- In office 10 March 1964 – 27 May 1964
- Prime Minister: Jawaharlal Nehru
- Preceded by: Ramchandra Martand Hajarnavis

Member of Parliament, Rajya Sabha
- In office 3 April 1968 – 2 April 1972
- Prime Minister: Indira Gandhi
- Constituency: Gujarat
- In office 3 April 1962 – 2 April 1968
- Prime Minister: Jawaharlal Nehru; Gulzarilal Nanda; Lal Bahadur Shastri; Indira Gandhi
- Constituency: Gujarat
- In office 3 April 1952 – 12 March 1957
- Prime Minister: Jawaharlal Nehru
- Constituency: Saurashtra State

Member of Parliament, Lok Sabha
- In office 5 April 1957 – 31 March 1962
- Prime Minister: Jawaharlal Nehru
- Preceded by: M. S. Himmatsinghji
- Constituency: Halar, Bombay State

Member of Constituent Assembly
- In office 6 December 1946 – 25 January 1950
- Constituency: Saurashtra State

Personal details
- Born: 19 January 1909 Muli, Muli State
- Died: 2 February 1982 (aged 73)
- Party: Indian National Congress
- Occupation: Politician; Advocate

Jaisukhlal Hathi (19 January 1909 – 2 February 1982) was an Indian politician. Born in Muli, Saurashtra, which is in the Indian state of Gujarat. He served as a Union Minister in the Indian Government and also as governor of Punjab and Haryana. He was a member of the Constituent Assembly, Lok Sabha, and Rajya Sabha. He was born in 1909 and died in 1982.

== Early life ==
His father Lalshankar Hathi was from Saurashtra. He married Padmavati on 27 May 1927, and he had four sons and one daughter. He studied at Alfred High School in Rajkot district, after which he moved to Bombay and cleared the Advocates Examination to join the Bar Council.

== Administrative career ==
In 1943, he was appointed District and Sessions Judge in the erstwhile Rajkot State. In 1948, he became the Chief Secretary of the erstwhile Princely State of Saurashtra.

== Parliamentary career ==
He was a member of the Constituent Assembly (1946-47) representing the State of Saurashtra. He was also elected to the Provisional Parliament in 1950. He served as a member of the Rajya Sabha from 3 April 1952 to 12 March 1957; and in 1957, he was elected to the Second Lok Sabha representing the Indian National Congress. Hathi was elected to Rajya Sabha in April 1962 and served till 3 April 1968, following which he was reelected the same day and served till 2 April 1974.

== Minister and Governor ==
Hathi served as Deputy Minister, Minister of State, and as Minister of Irrigation in the Union Council of Ministers holding portfolios of Irrigation and Power, Supply, Home Affairs, Defence from 1952 to 1962. He served as Minister of Labour and Rehabilitation from 1962 to 1964 and 1967–69. He was appointed Governor of Haryana on 14 August 1976 and he served till 23 September 1977, following which he was transferred to Punjab on 24 September 1977, where he served till 26 August 1981. He resigned from Governorship of Punjab on health grounds.

== Other Administrative Positions and Public Life ==
He headed the Commission on Drugs and Pharmaceuticals in 1974, where he submitted a report that is known as the Hathi Commission report (1975). He also served as Chairman of National Lawyers Forum. He was a Director in the Press Trust of India. He worked with Bharatiya Vidya Bhavan since its inception serving as Chairman of Bhavan's International Chapter and as Chairman of Central Kendra Committee. He served as a trustee of the Somnath and Dwarka Temples.

== Writings ==
He wrote "Position of Indian States In Federation" in 1939 with an aim to define the roles that various Indian states would play in the Indian federation. "Sidelights on Indian Princess" was his second publication which was published in 1975. He also wrote a number of short stories for Bhavan's Journal from 1970 to 1974. His biography was titled "As It Happened."
