= Jothi Venkatachalam =

Indian politician

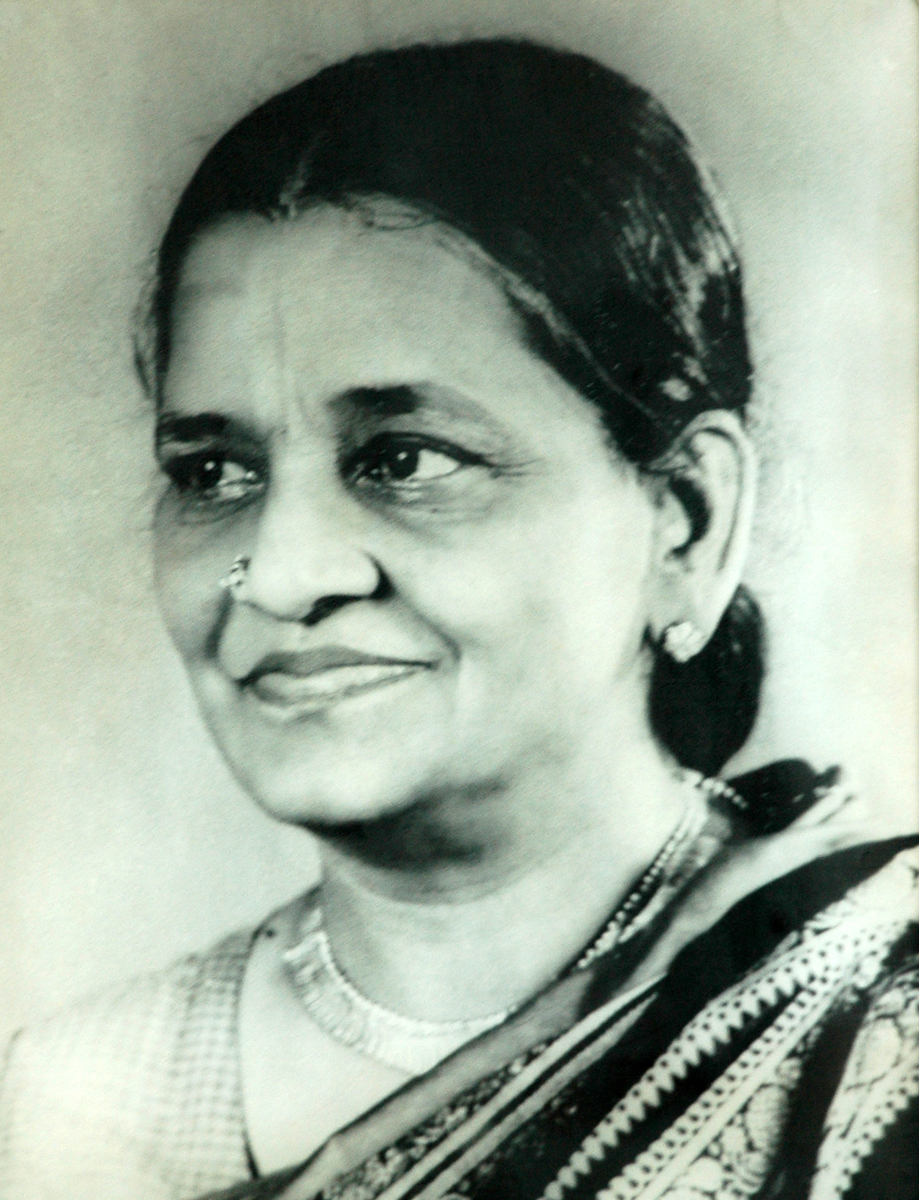

Personal details
- Born: 27 October 1917 Maymyo, British Burma, Now Myanmar
- Died: November 28, 1992 (aged 75)
- Occupation: Governor of Kerala, India
- Awards: Padma Shri (1974)

Jothi Venkatachalam (27 October 1917 - 28 November 1992) was an Indian politician who served as Governor of Kerala and Member of the Legislative Assembly of Tamil Nadu.

== Life and career ==
Jothi Venkatachalam was born in Maymyo, hill city of British Burma (now Myanmar), on 27 October 1917 to G. Kuppuram and MeenaPai. Her father was appointed to serve in Secretary office of British Burma, resigned and came back to Chennai in 1930 due to political turmoil during that time in Burma. Jothi continued her study in Ewart Matriculation Higher Secondary School, Veppery, Chennai, Tamil Nadu.

Jothi was more involved in social works and came to the attention of Congress party. She was appointed minister for Liquor Prohibition and Women's Welfare in the C. Rajagopalachari cabinet between 10 October 1953 and 12 April 1954. Thus Jothi Venkatachalam became the first woman to be minister in Tamil Nadu state in the republic of India. In that very brief stint, she clubbed the liquor prohibition department with Police department.

Later she was elected to the Tamil Nadu legislative assembly from Egmore constituency as an Indian National Congress candidate in 1962 election, and as an Indian National Congress (Organisation) candidate from Srirangam constituency in 1971 election. This time Chief Minister K. Kamaraj appointed her as minister for public health in K. Kamaraj's cabinet from 1962 and continued in M. Bhakthavatchalam's ministry till 1967.

Later she served as the governor of Kerala from 14 October 1977 to 26 October 1982.

In 1974, Jothi Venkatachalam was conferred with a 'Padma Shri' award for her dedicated contribution in the field of Public Affairs.

On 19 July 1961, her husband was killed in a road accident. Jothi Venkatachalam is also deceased.
