= Lallan Prasad Singh =

Indian politician

Lallan Prasad Singh ICS

Governor of Assam
- In office 19 September 1973 – 10 August 1981
- Appointed by: V. V. Giri
- Chief Minister: Sarat Chandra Sinha; Golap Borbora; Jogendra Nath Hazarika; Anwara Taimur; Keshab Chandra Gogoi
- Preceded by: Braj Kumar Nehru
- Succeeded by: Prakash Mehrotra

Governor of Meghalaya
- Additional charge
- In office 19 September 1973 – 10 August 1981
- Appointed by: V. V. Giri
- Chief Minister: Williamson A. Sangma; Darwin Diengdoh Pugh; B. B. Lyngdoh; Williamson A. Sangma
- Preceded by: Braj Kumar Nehru
- Succeeded by: Prakash Mehrotra

Governor of Nagaland
- Additional charge
- In office 19 September 1973 – 10 August 1981
- Appointed by: V. V. Giri
- Chief Minister: Hokishe Sema; Vizol Koso; John Bosco Jasokie; Vizol Koso; S. C. Jamir; John Bosco Jasokie
- Preceded by: Braj Kumar Nehru
- Succeeded by: S. M. H. Burney

Governor of Manipur
- Additional charge
- In office 23 September 1973 – 10 August 1981
- Appointed by: V. V. Giri
- Chief Minister: Mohammed Alimuddin; Yangmaso Shaiza; Rajkumar Dorendra Singh; Yangmaso Shaiza; Rajkumar Dorendra Singh; Rishang Keishing
- Preceded by: Braj Kumar Nehru
- Succeeded by: S. M. H. Burney

Governor of Tripura
- Additional charge
- In office 23 September 1973 – 10 August 1981
- Appointed by: V. V. Giri
- Chief Minister: Sukhamoy Sen Gupta; Prafulla Kumar Das; Radhika Ranjan Gupta; Nripen Chakraborty
- Preceded by: Braj Kumar Nehru
- Succeeded by: S. M. H. Burney

Ambassador of India to Nepal
- In office 22 January 1972 – 5 September 1973
- Preceded by: Raj Bahadur
- Succeeded by: Maharaja Krishna Rasgotra

Home Secretary
- In office 18 September 1964 – 1 January 1971
- Preceded by: V. Vishwanathan
- Succeeded by: Govind Narain

Personal details
- Born: 1912 Buxar, Bihar, India
- Died: 9 November 1998 (age 86)
- Awards: Padma Vibhushan (1999) (posthumously)

Lallan Prasad Singh ICS (1912 – 17 October 1998) was an Indian bureaucrat who became Governor of Assam (1973–80), Manipur (1973–80, 1982–83), Meghalaya (1973–80), Nagaland (1973–81), and Tripura (1973–80).

He was awarded Padma Vibhushan award in 1999 after his death.

He was born in Buxar, Bihar, India, in 1912 and died in New Delhi on 17 October 1998. A member of the 1936 batch of the Indian Civil Service (ICS), he joined the ICS on 9 September 1936. After independence in 1947, he had a long and distinguished career in the civil service. L.P. Singh was Chief Secretary to the government of Bihar in the first post-independence government (1946–61). He also served briefly as the Finance Secretary to the government of Bihar. He enjoyed the confidence of both the first Bihar Chief Minister Dr S K Singh & deputy Chief Minister cum Finance Minister Dr Anugrah Narain Sinha. He also held several posts including Home Secretary of India, Governor of the five North Eastern States and Indian Ambassador to Nepal.

Apart from his bureaucratic career, Singh also authored two books: Portrait of Lal Bahadur Shastri: the Quintessential Gandhian and Electoral Reform in India.

He was married to Manorama Singh (née Mehta) and had four children, namely, Vineeta, Nandini, Vijay and Priyadarshini.

== See also ==
- Shillong Accord of 1975
