= List of governors of Tripura =

Governors of the state of Tripura, India

Governor of Tripura
- Emblem of Tripura

- Flag of India

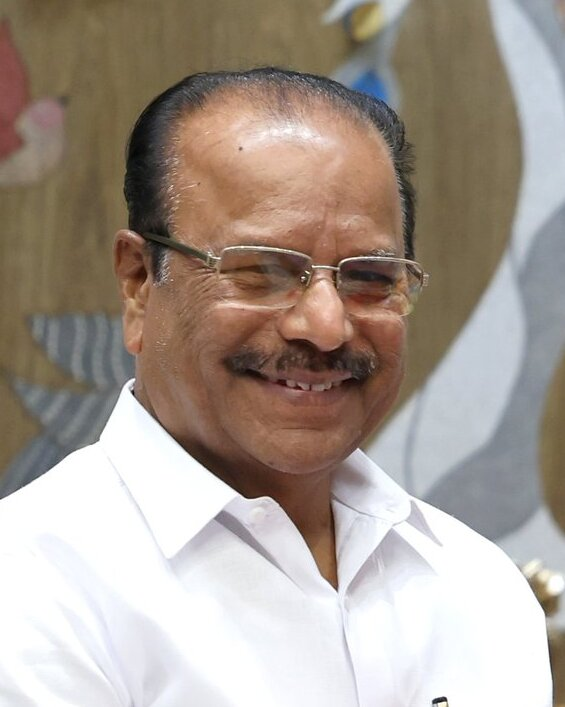
- Incumbent; N. Indrasena Reddy since 26 October 2023
- Style: His Excellency
- Residence: Lok Bhavan; Agartala
- Appointer: President of India
- Term length: At the pleasure of the president
- Formation: rajbhavan.tripura.gov.in

The state of Tripura is surrounded by eastern Bangladesh.

This is a list of the governors of Tripura, a state in northeast India, since its inception as a state on 21 January 1972.

== Powers and functions ==
The governor enjoys many different types of powers:

- Executive powers related to administration, appointments and removals,
- Legislative powers related to lawmaking and the state legislature, that is Vidhan Sabha or Vidhan Parishad, and
- Discretionary powers to be carried out according to the discretion of the governor.

== List ==
Legend

- ^{†} Died in office
- ^{§} Transferred
- ^{‡} Resigned/removed

Color key

- indicates acting/additional charge

#	Portrait	Name (born – died)	Home state	Tenure in office			Appointer (President)
#	Portrait	Name (born – died)	Home state	From	To	Term length	Appointer (President)
1		Braj Kumar Nehru; ICS (Retd) (1909–2001); Governor of Assam	Uttar Pradesh	21 January 1972 (Note: Concurrently also served as the Governor of Assam and Nagaland (1968–1973); and as the Governor of Meghalaya and Manipur (1972–1973))	22 September 1973	1 year, 244 days	V. V. Giri
2		Lallan Prasad Singh; ICS (Retd) (1912–1998); Governor of Assam	Bihar	23 September 1973 (Note: Concurrently also served as the Assam, Meghalaya, Manipur, and Nagaland)	13 August 1981	7 years, 324 days	V. V. Giri
3		S. M. H. Burney; IAS (Retd) (1924–2014); Governor of Manipur and Nagaland	Uttar Pradesh	14 August 1981 (Note: Concurrently also served as the Governor of Manipur and Nagaland)	13 June 1984^{[§]} (Note: Transferred as the Governor of Haryana)	2 years, 304 days	Neelam Sanjiva Reddy
4		General; K. V. Krishna Rao (Retd); PVSM (1923–2016); Governor of Manipur and Nagaland	Andhra Pradesh	14 June 1984	11 July 1989^{[§]} (Note: Transferred as the Governor of Jammu and Kashmir)	5 years, 27 days	Zail Singh
5		Sultan Singh (1923–2014)	Haryana	12 July 1989	11 February 1990^{[‡]}	214 days	Ramaswamy Venkataraman
6		K. V. Raghunatha Reddy (1924–2002)	Andhra Pradesh	12 February 1990	14 August 1993^{[§]} (Note: Transferred as the Governor of West Bengal)	3 years, 183 days	Ramaswamy Venkataraman
7		Romesh Bhandari; IFS (Retd) (1928–2013)	Punjab	15 August 1993	15 June 1995^{[§]} (Note: Transferred as the Governor of Goa)	1 year, 304 days	Shankar Dayal Sharma
8		Siddheshwar Prasad (1929–2023)	Bihar	16 June 1995	22 June 2000	5 years, 6 days	Shankar Dayal Sharma
9		Lieutenant General; Krishna Mohan Seth (Retd); PVSM AVSM (born 1939)	Uttar Pradesh	23 June 2000	31 May 2003^{[§]} (Note: Transferred as the Governor of Chhattisgarh)	2 years, 342 days	K. R. Narayanan
10		Dinesh Nandan Sahay; IPS (Retd) (1936–2018)	Bihar	2 June 2003	14 October 2009	6 years, 134 days	A. P. J. Abdul Kalam
11		Kamla Beniwal (1927–2024)	Rajasthan	15 October 2009	26 November 2009^{[§]}	42 days	Pratibha Patil
12		D. Y. Patil (1935–2026)	Maharashtra	27 November 2009	24 March 2013^{[§]} (Note: Transferred as the Governor of Bihar)	3 years, 117 days	Pratibha Patil
13		Devanand Konwar (1934–2020)	Assam	25 March 2013	29 June 2014	1 year, 96 days	Pranab Mukherjee
13		Vakkom Purushothaman (1928–2023) (Additional Charge)	Kerala	30 June 2014	8 July 2014^{[‡]}	8 days	Pranab Mukherjee
14		Padmanabha Balakrishna Acharya (1931–2023) (Additional Charge)	Karnataka	21 July 2014	19 May 2015	302 days	Pranab Mukherjee
15		Tathagata Roy (born 1945)	West Bengal	20 May 2015	30 September 2015	133 days	Pranab Mukherjee
16		Keshari Nath Tripathi (1934- 2023) (Acting)	Uttar Pradesh	30 September 2015	20 November 2015	51 days	Pranab Mukherjee
17		Tathagata Roy (born 1945)	West Bengal	20 November 2015	15 June 2018	2 years, 207 days	Pranab Mukherjee
18		Keshari Nath Tripathi (1934- 2023)(Acting)	Uttar Pradesh	15 June 2018	25 August 2018	71 days	Ram Nath Kovind
19		Kaptan Singh Solanki (born 1939)	Madhya Pradesh	25 August 2018	28 July 2019	337 days	Ram Nath Kovind
20		Ramesh Bais (born 1947)	Chhattisgarh	29 July 2019	13 July 2021^{[§]} (Note: Transferred as the Governor of Jharkhand)	1 year, 349 days	Ram Nath Kovind
21		Satyadev Narayan Arya (born 1939)	Bihar	14 July 2021	26 October 2023	2 years, 103 days	Ram Nath Kovind
22		N. Indrasena Reddy (born 1953)	Telangana	26 October 2023	Incumbent	2 years, 364 days	Droupadi Murmu

== Oath ==
“I, A. B., do swear in the name of God/solemly affirm that I will faithfully execute the office of Governor (or discharge the functions of the Governor) of Tripura and will to the best of my ability preserve, protect and defend the Constitution and the law and that I will devote myself to the service and well-being of the people of Tripura.”Ami, [Apnar Naam], Ishwarer naame shapath korchhi je, ami faithful bhabe [State-er Naam]-er Governor-er office execute korbo (othoba Governor-er shob functions discharge korbo) ebong ami amar best ability diye Constitution ar law-ke preserve, protect, ar defend korbo. Ami nijeke [State-er Naam]-er manushder service ar well-being-er jonne devote korbo."

== See also ==
- Tripura
- Governors of India
