= List of governors of Haryana =

Governor of Haryana
- Emblem of Haryana

- Flag of India

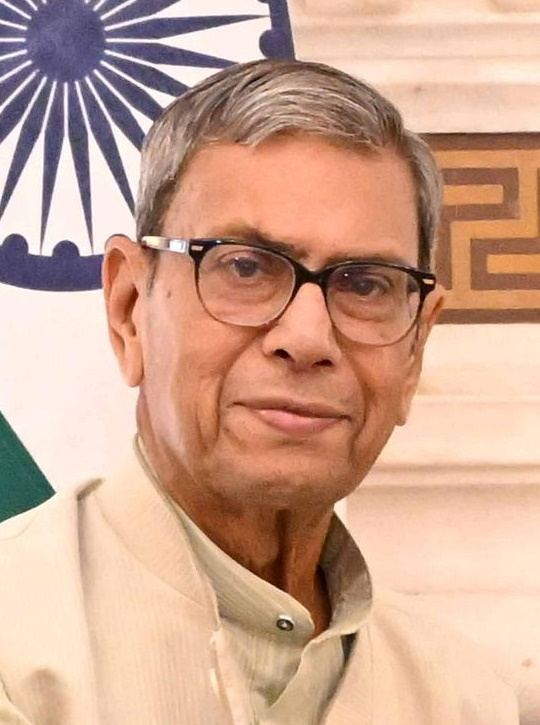
- Incumbent; Ashim Kumar Ghosh since 21 July 2025
- Style: His Excellency
- Residence: Lok Bhavan; Chandigarh
- Appointer: President of India
- Term length: At the pleasure of the president
- Inaugural holder: Dharma Vira
- Formation: 1 November 1966; 59 years ago
- Website: https://lokbhavan.haryana.gov.in

This is a list of governors of the Indian state of Haryana, which was carved out from Punjab on 1 November 1966.

== Predecessor ==
Legend

- ^{†} Died in office
- ^{§} Transferred
- ^{‡} Resigned/removed

Color key

- indicates acting/additional charge

#	Portrait	Name (born – died)	Home state	Tenure in office			Appointer (President)
#	Portrait	Name (born – died)	Home state	From	To	Time in office	Appointer (President)
Governor of East Punjab
1		Sir Chandulal Madhavlal Trivedi (1893–1980)	Bombay Presidency	15 August 1947	26 January 1950	2 years, 164 days	Lord Mountbatten (Governor-General)
Governor of Punjab
(1)		Chandulal Madhavlal Trivedi (1893–1980)	Bombay Presidency	26 January 1950	11 March 1953	3 years, 44 days	Rajendra Prasad
2		Chandeshwar Prasad Narayan Singh (1901–1994)	Bihar	11 March 1953	15 September 1958	5 years, 188 days	Rajendra Prasad
3		Narhar Vishnu Gadgil (1896–1966)	Madhya Pradesh	15 September 1958	1 October 1962	4 years, 16 days	Rajendra Prasad
4		Pattom A. Thanu Pillai (1885–1970)	Kerala	1 October 1962	4 May 1964^{[§]} (Note: Transferred as the Governor of Andhra Pradesh)	1 year, 216 days	Sarvepalli Radhakrishnan
5		Hafiz Mohamad Ibrahim (1889–1968)	Uttar Pradesh	4 May 1964	1 September 1965	1 year, 120 days	Sarvepalli Radhakrishnan
6		Ujjal Singh (1895–1983)	Punjab	1 September 1965	26 June 1966^{[§]} (Note: Transferred as the Governor of Tamil Nadu)	298 days	Sarvepalli Radhakrishnan
7		Dharma Vira; ICS (Retd) (1906–2000)	Uttar Pradesh	27 June 1966	1 June 1967^{[§]} (Note: Transferred as the Governor of West Bengal)	339 days	Sarvepalli Radhakrishnan

== List of governors of Haryana ==
Legend

- ^{†} Died in office
- ^{§} Transferred
- ^{‡} Resigned/removed

Color key

- indicates acting/additional charge

#	Portrait	Name (born – died)	Home state	Tenure in office			Appointer (President)
#	Portrait	Name (born – died)	Home state	From	To	Time in office	Appointer (President)
1		Dharma Vira; ICS (Retd) (1906–2000); Governor of Punjab	Uttar Pradesh	1 November 1966	14 September 1967^{[§]} (Note: Transferred as the Governor of West Bengal)	317 days	Sarvepalli Radhakrishnan
2		Birendra Narayan Chakraborty; ICS (Retd) (1904–1976)	West Bengal	15 September 1967	26 March 1976^{[†]}	8 years, 193 days	Zakir Husain
3		Justice; Ranjit Singh Narula (1908–2005) (Additional charge)	Punjab	27 March 1976	13 August 1976	139 days	Fakhruddin Ali Ahmed
4		Jaisukh Lal Hathi (1909–1982)	Gujarat	14 August 1976	23 September 1977^{[§]} (Note: Transferred as the Governor of Punjab)	1 year, 40 days	Fakhruddin Ali Ahmed
5		Harcharan Singh Brar (1922–2009)	Punjab	24 September 1977	9 December 1979^{[‡]}	2 years, 76 days	Neelam Sanjiva Reddy
6		Justice; Surjit Singh Sandhawalia (1925–2007) (Additional charge)	Punjab	10 December 1979	27 February 1980	79 days	Neelam Sanjiva Reddy
7		Ganpatrao Devji Tapase (1909–1992)	Maharashtra	28 February 1980	13 June 1984	4 years, 106 days	Neelam Sanjiva Reddy
8		S. M. H. Burney; IAS (Retd) (1924–2014)	Uttar Pradesh	14 June 1984	21 February 1988	3 years, 252 days	Zail Singh
9		Hari Anand Barari; IPS (Retd) (1924–2014)	West Bengal	22 February 1988	6 February 1990^{[‡]}	1 year, 349 days	Ramaswamy Venkataraman
10		Dhanik Lal Mandal (1932–2022)	Bihar	7 February 1990	13 June 1995	5 years, 126 days	Ramaswamy Venkataraman
11		Mahabir Prasad (1939–2010)	Uttar Pradesh	14 June 1995	18 June 2000	5 years, 4 days	Shankar Dayal Sharma
12		Babu Parmanand (1932–2008)	Jammu and Kashmir	19 June 2000	1 July 2004^{[‡]}	4 years, 12 days	K. R. Narayanan
13		Justice (Retd); Om Prakash Verma (1937–2015) (Additional charge)	Uttar Pradesh	2 July 2004	7 July 2004	5 days	A. P. J. Abdul Kalam
14		Akhlaqur Rahman Kidwai (1921–2016)	National Capital Territory of Delhi	7 July 2004	27 July 2009	5 years, 20 days	A. P. J. Abdul Kalam
15		Jagannath Pahadia (1932–2021)	Rajasthan	27 July 2009	26 July 2014	4 years, 364 days	Pratibha Patil
16		Kaptan Singh Solanki (born 1939)	Madhya Pradesh	27 July 2014	25 August 2018^{[§]} (Note: Transferred as the Governor of Tripura)	4 years, 29 days	Pranab Mukherjee
17		Satyadev Narayan Arya (born 1939)	Bihar	25 August 2018	6 July 2021^{[§]}	2 years, 315 days	Ram Nath Kovind
18		Bandaru Dattatreya (born 1947)	Telangana	7 July 2021	20 July 2025	4 years, 13 days	Ram Nath Kovind
19		Ashim Kumar Ghosh (born 1944)	West Bengal	21 July 2025	Incumbent	1 year, 84 days	Droupadi Murmu

== Oath ==
“I, A. B., do swear in the name of God/solemly affirm that I will faithfully execute the office of Governor (or discharge the functions of the Governor) of .............(name of the State) and will to the best of my ability preserve, protect and defend the Constitution and the law and that I will devote myself to the service and well-being of the people of ..………(name of the State).” Main, [Name], Ishwar ki shapath leta hoon (ya nishtha se pratigya karta hoon) ki main sachhe mann se Governor (Rajyapal) ke roop mein [State Name] ke pad ka karyabhar sambhalunga (ya zimmedari uthaunga). Main apni poori kabiliyat se Samvidhan (Constitution) aur kanoon (Law) ki raksha, suraksha aur bachaav karunga, aur main apne aap ko [State Name] ki janta ki seva aur kalyan (well-being) mein samarpit karunga."

== See also ==
- Haryana
- Governors of India
