= List of governors of Meghalaya =

Meghalaya's head of state

Governor of Meghalaya
- Emblem of Meghalaya

- Flag of India

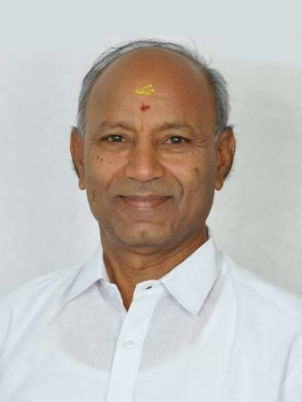
- Incumbent; C. H. Vijayashankar since 30 July 2024
- Residence: Lok Bhavan, Shillong
- Appointer: President of India
- Term length: At the pleasure of the president
- Inaugural holder: Braj Kumar Nehru
- Formation: 21 January 1972; 54 years ago
- Website: meggovernor.gov.in

The Governor of Meghalaya is the nominal head of state of the Indian state of Meghalaya and a representative of the president of India. The governor is appointed by the president for a term of five years and remains in office at the pleasure of the president. The official residence of the governor is Raj Bhavan.

The position of the governor of Meghalaya came into existence following the creation of the state in January 1972 as a result of the bifurcation of Assam. The first governor was Braj Kumar Nehru, then governor of Assam who concurrently of the governor of the newly created state of Meghalaya from 21 January 1972 until his transfer on 19 September 1973. From 21 January 1972 until 27 July 1989, the Governor of Assam concurrently served as the Governor of Meghalaya.

The current governor is C. H. Vijayashankar who has been in office since 30 July 2024. He is the 18th governor. The longest-serving governor of the state is M. M. Jacob who served for 11 years, 296 days from 19 June 1995 until retiring on 11 April 2007.

== Powers and functions ==
The governor enjoys many different types of powers:

- Executive powers related to administration, appointments and removals,
- Legislative powers related to lawmaking and the state legislature, that is Vidhan Sabha or Vidhan Parishad, and
- Discretionary powers to be carried out according to the discretion of the governor.

Apart from enjoying various constitutional powers, the governor of Meghalaya also the Chief Rector of the North Eastern Hill University, the sole central university in the state.

== List ==
This is a list of the governors of Meghalaya state in northeastern India. Meghalaya became an autonomous state within Assam on 1 April 1970 and a separate state on 21 January 1972.

Legend

- ^{§} Transferred
- ^{‡} Resigned

Color key

- indicates acting/additional charge

#	Portrait	Name (lifespan)	Home state/ UT	Tenure in office			Appointer (President)
#	Portrait	Name (lifespan)	Home state/ UT	From	To	Term length	Appointer (President)
1		Braj Kumar Nehru; ICS (Retd) (1909–2001)	Uttar Pradesh	21 January 1972	18 September 1973	1 year, 240 days	V. V. Giri
2		Lallan Prasad Singh; ICS (Retd) (1912–1998)	Bihar	19 September 1973	11 August 1981	7 years, 325 days	
3		Prakash Mehrotra (1925–1988)	Uttar Pradesh	12 August 1981	28 March 1984^{[‡]}	2 years, 229 days	Neelam Sanjiva Reddy
4		Justice; Tribeni Sahai Misra (1922–2005) (Acting)	Uttar Pradesh	29 March 1984	15 April 1984	18 days	Zail Singh
5		Bhishma Narain Singh (1933–2018)	Bihar	16 April 1984	10 May 1989	5 years, 25 days	Zail Singh
6		Hari Dev Joshi (1920–1995)	Rajasthan	11 May 1989	26 July 1989^{[‡]}	72 days	Ramaswamy Venkataraman
7		A. A. Rahim (1920–2015)	Kerala	27 July 1989	8 May 1990^{[‡]}	285 days	Ramaswamy Venkataraman
8		Madhukar Dighe (1920–2014)	Uttar Pradesh	9 May 1990	8 June 1995	5 years, 30 days	Ramaswamy Venkataraman
9		M. M. Jacob (1926–2018)	Kerala	19 June 1995	11 April 2007	11 years, 296 days	Shankar Dayal Sharma
10		Banwari Lal Joshi; IPS (Retd) (1936–2017)	Rajasthan	12 April 2007	28 October 2007^{[§]} (Note: Transferred as the Governor of Uttarakhand)	199 days	A. P. J. Abdul Kalam
11		Shivinder Singh Sidhu; IAS (Retd) (1929–2018) (Additional Charge)	Punjab	29 October 2007	30 June 2008	245 days	Pratibha Patil
12		Ranjit Shekhar Mooshahary; IPS (Retd) (born 1947)	Assam	1 July 2008	30 June 2013	4 years, 364 days	Pratibha Patil
13		Krishan Kant Paul; IPS (Retd) (born 1948)	Chandigarh	1 July 2013	6 January 2015^{[§]}	1 year, 189 days	Pranab Mukherjee
14		Keshari Nath Tripathi (1934–2023) (Additional Charge)	Uttar Pradesh	6 January 2015	19 May 2015	133 days	Pranab Mukherjee
15		V. Shanmuganathan (born 1949)	Tamil Nadu	20 May 2015	27 January 2017^{[‡]}	1 year, 252 days	Pranab Mukherjee
16		Banwarilal Purohit (born 1940) (Additional Charge)	Maharashtra	27 January 2017	5 October 2017^{[§]} (Note: Transferred as the Governor of Tamil Nadu)	251 days	Pranab Mukherjee
17		Ganga Prasad Chaurasia (born 1939)	Bihar	5 October 2017	25 August 2018^{[§]} (Note: Transferred as the Governor of Sikkim)	324 days	Ram Nath Kovind
18		Tathagata Roy (born 1945)	West Bengal	25 August 2018	18 December 2019	1 year, 115 days	Ram Nath Kovind
19		R. N. Ravi; IPS (Retd) (born 1952) (Acting)	Bihar	18 December 2019	26 January 2020	39 days	Ram Nath Kovind
(18)		Tathagata Roy (born 1945)	West Bengal	27 January 2020	18 August 2020	204 days	Ram Nath Kovind
20		Satya Pal Malik (1946–2025)	Uttar Pradesh	18 August 2020	3 October 2022	2 years, 46 days	Ram Nath Kovind
21		Brigadier; B. D. Mishra(Retd) (born 1939) (Additional Charge)	Uttar Pradesh	4 October 2022	17 February 2023	136 days	Droupadi Murmu
22		Phagu Chauhan (born 1948)	Uttar Pradesh	18 February 2023	29 July 2024	1 year, 162 days	Droupadi Murmu
23		C. H. Vijayashankar (born 1956)	Karnataka	30 July 2024	Incumbent	2 years, 83 days	Droupadi Murmu

== Oath ==
“I (name of the Governor of Meghalaya), do swear in the name of God/solemly affirm that I will faithfully execute the office of Governor (or discharge the functions of the Governor) of Meghalaya and will to the best of my ability preserve, protect and defend the Constitution and the law and that I will devote myself to the service and well-being of the people of Meghalaya .”

== See also ==
- Meghalaya
- Governors of India
- Chief Minister of Meghalaya
- List of current governors of all Indian states
