= 1953 in India =

- Centuries: 18th; 19th; 20th; 21st
- Decades: 1930s; 1940s; 1950s; 1960s; 1970s
- See also: List of years in India; Timeline of Indian history

Events in the year 1953 in the Republic of India.

== Incumbents ==
- President of India – Rajendra Prasad
- Prime Minister of India – Jawaharlal Nehru
- Vice President of India - Sarvepalli Radhakrishnan
- Chief Justice of India – M. Patanjali Sastri

=== Governors ===
- Andhra Pradesh – Chandulal Madhavlal Trivedi
- Assam – Jairamdas Daulatram
- Bihar – R. R. Diwakar
- Bombay – Raja Sir Maharaj Singh
- Jammu and Kashmir – Karan Singh
- Orissa – Fazal Ali
- Punjab – Chandulal Madhavlal Trivedi (until 11 March), Chandeshwar Prasad Narayan Singh (starting 11 March)
- Rajasthan – Maharaj Man Singh II
- Uttar Pradesh – Kanhaiyalal Maneklal Munshi
- West Bengal – Harendra Coomar Mookerjee

== Events ==
- National income - ₹116,067 million
- 15 June – Indian Airlines created.
- Air India nationalised.
- 18 June - C. Rajagopalachari introduced Modified Scheme of Elementary Education in Madras State. The scheme was widely criticised and opposed due to Casteism ingrained in it.
- 15 July - Kallakudi demonstration in Tamilnadu.
- 8 August - Prime Minister of Jammu and Kashmir Sheikh Abdullah and his government dismissed by Sadr-e-Riyasat Karan Singh.
- 15 September - Police firing against labourers at Mattancherry for protesting against the chappa system, an early work-guarantee scheme.
- 1 October – Andhra State was formed carving Telugu speaking regions out of erstwhile Madras Presidency.

== Law ==
- Government of India sets up first Backward classes commission headed by Kaka Kalelkar.

== Births ==
- 7 January – K. Bhagyaraj, director, actor, script-writer and producer
- 1 April – Hari Chand, long-distance runner
- 8 May, Devi Prasad Shetty, top India's leading heart surgeon and social entrepreneur
- 15 May – Varaprasad Rao Velagapalli, politician and former member of parliament from Tirupati.
- 27 May – Ranjit Sinha, police officer (died 2021)
- 15 June – Kambhampati Hari Babu, politician and member of parliament from Visakhapatnam.
- 11 July – Suresh Prabhu, Politician, Railway Minister since 2014.
- 24 July – Srividya, actress (died 2006).
- 30 August – Avinash Balkrishna Patwardhan, engineer, author and Indian classical music researcher,
- 8 December – Manobala, director, actor, producer and comedian.

== Deaths ==
- 22 November – Syed Sulaiman Nadvi, historian, biographer, littérateur and scholar of Islam (born 1884).
- 10 December – Abdullah Yusuf Ali, Islamic scholar who translated the Qur'an into English (born 1872).

== See also ==
- Bollywood films of 1953
