= 1950 in India =

- Centuries: 18th; 19th; 20th; 21st
- Decades: 1930s; 1940s; 1950s; 1960s; 1970s
- See also: List of years in India; Timeline of Indian history

Events in the year 1950 in the Republic of India.

India got its independence from Britain in 1947, but still had a King. George VI, the King of United Kingdom was the King of India as well. Some provisions of the Indian Constitution had come into force on November 26, 1949. January 26, 1950 had been chosen as the day for full implementation of the Constitution making India a Republic and officially ending its ties to British monarchy.

Rajendra Prasad was sworn in as the first President of the country on January 26, 1950.

Just a day before the birth of the Republic of India, the Election Commission of India was born.

Main body to devise and revise plans for the progress of India was envisaged, The Planning Commission.

Liaquat-Nehru Pact or Delhi Pact was signed between India and Pakistan in April. Refugees were allowed to return to their native country unmolested to dispose of their property in either country.

India and Nepal officially became friends. Though, India and Nepal has been ancient civilizations and have always had deep cultural relations, they did not have a bilateral treaty to guide their relations in the modern world. The 1950-India-Nepal Treaty of Peace and Friendship was signed. The new treaty allowed free movement of people and goods between the two countries.

Andaman and Nicobar Island's was handed over to India by England and Burma (Myanmar).

After 1947, the year of India's Independence, 1950 was indeed the next most momentous year.

== Incumbents ==
- King of India – George VI (until 26 Jan.)
- Governor-General of India – C. Rajagopalachari (until 26 Jan.)
- President of India – Rajendra Prasad took office on 26 January.
- Prime Minister of India – Jawaharlal Nehru
- Chief Justice of India – Sir H. J. Kania (from 26 Jan.)

=== Governors ===
- Assam: Sri Prakasa (until 27 May), Jairamdas Daulatram (starting 27 May)
- Bihar: Madhav Shrihari Aney
- Bombay State: Raja Maharaj Singh
- Jammu and Kashmir: Yuvraj Karan Singh
- Orissa: Asaf Ali
- Punjab: Chandulal Madhavlal Trivedi
- Rajasthan: Man Singh II
- Madras state: Krishna Kumarsinhji Bhavsinhji
- Uttar Pradesh: Homi Mody
- West Bengal: Kailash Nath Katju

== Events ==
- National income - ₹102,216 million
- 25 January – Election Commission is established.
- 26 January –
  - The Constitution comes into force making India a republic, the day is observed as Republic Day, and Article 370 of the Constitution of India, which was drafted into the Constitution in October 1949, came into effect, giving the state of Jammu and Kashmir autonomy. India becomes the first republic in the Commonwealth of Nations.
  - Dr. Rajendra Prasad moves into Rashtrapati Bhavan as the first President of India.
- 11 February - Twenty two Communist Party of India from Malabar District killed in police firing in Salem Central Prison.
- 8 April – Liaquat–Nehru Pact signed by Pakistan's Prime Minister Liaquat Ali Khan and Indian Prime Minister Jawaharlal Nehru in New Delhi
- 14 May - All India Radio begins broadcasting from Calicut.
- 15 August – The 8.6 M_{w} Assam–Tibet earthquake shakes the region with a maximum Mercalli intensity of XI (Extreme), killing between 1,500–3,300 people.
- 18 August - Maulana Azad, the Education Minister opens the first Indian Institutes of Technology at Kharagpur.
- 3 November - Air India Flight 245 crashed near Mont Blanc, France.
- 13 December - A Douglas DC-3 Dakota flight of Air India having a scheduled flight between Madras and Trivandrum International Airport crashed near Kotagiri on its descent to Coimbatore International Airport killing 20 people. The wreckage was discovered only after three days. The son of Travancore–Cochin Chief minister, C. Kesavan was also killed in the accident.
- Andaman and Nicobar Islands handed over to India by the United Kingdom and Burma

== Law ==
- 28 January – the Supreme Court of India is established, replacing both the Judicial Committee of the Privy Council and the Federal Court of India at the top of India's court system.
- 5 June – Bihar High Court struck down Bihar Management of Estates and Tenures Act, 1949 as unconstitutional.
- 31 July – Indo-Nepal Treaty of Peace and Friendship signed

== Births ==
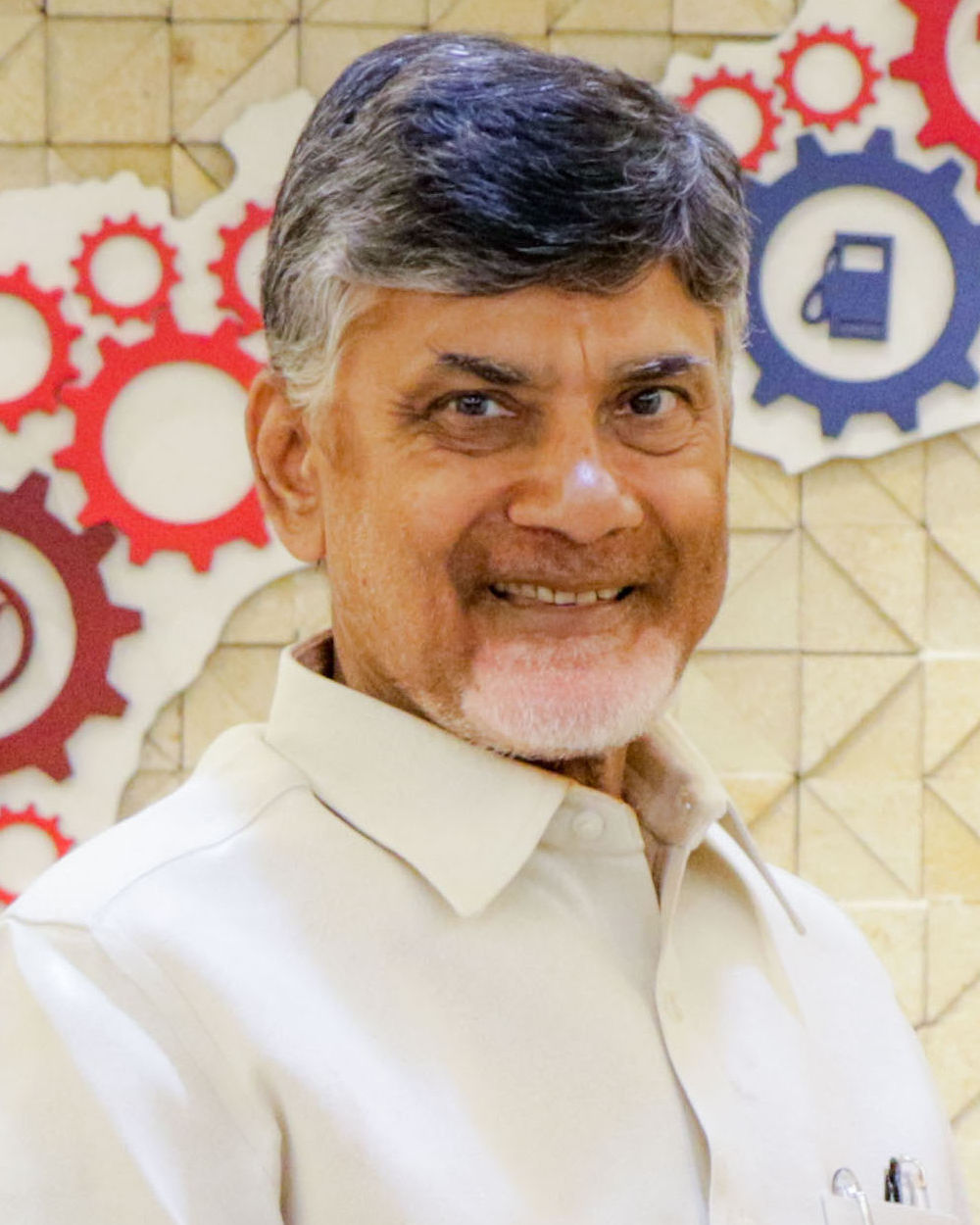
N. Chandrababu Naidu

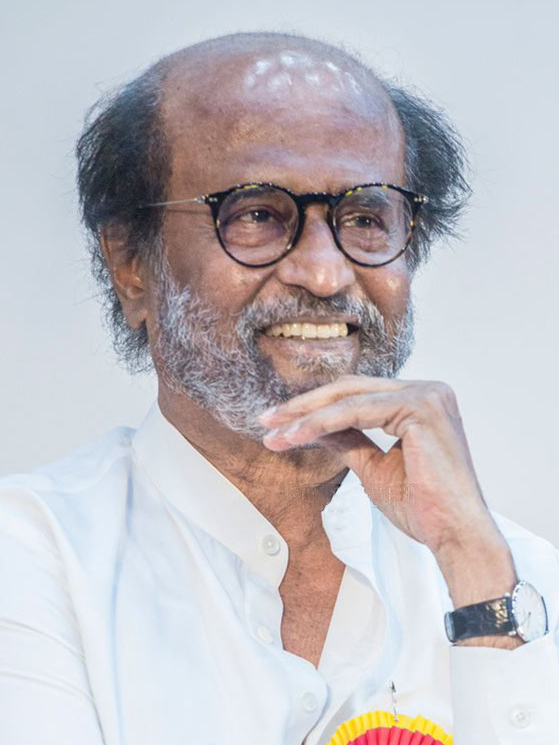
Rajinikanth

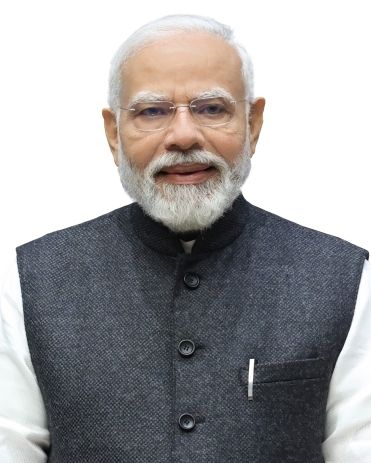
Narendra Modi

=== January to June ===
- 1 January – Deepa Mehta, Indian-Canadian director and screenwriter
- 5 January – Jagathy Sreekumar, comedian-actor
- 9 January – Y. Gee. Mahendra, dramatist, actor, singer playwright and comedian
- 14 January – Rambhadracharya, Hindu religious leader
- 9 February – Kilimanoor Chandran, author, poet and columnist
- 20 April – N. Chandrababu Naidu, politician and Chief Minister of Andhra Pradesh
- 21 April – Shivaji Satam, actor
- 4 May – Konakalla Narayana Rao, politician and member of parliament from Machilipatnam
- 13 May – J. M. Aaron Rashid, politician.
- 1 June – Ghulam Mohammad Vastanvi, Islamic scholar and educationist (died 2025)
- 4 June – S. P. Y. Reddy, politician and member of parliament from Nandyal (died 2019).
- 19 June – Hafeez Contractor, architect
- 20 June – Madhusudhan Rao, film actor
- 22 June – Tom Alter, film actor (died 2017)

=== July to December ===
- 1 July – Ekram Ali, poet and critic
- 19 August – Sudha Murty, social worker and author
- 11 September – Mohan Bhagwat, Sarsanghchalak of the Rashtriya Swayamsevak Sangh
- 17 September – Narendra Modi, politician and Prime Minister of India
- 18 September
  - Shabana Azmi, actress and social activist
  - Vishnuvardhan, Kannada actor (died 2009)
- 24 September – Mohinder Amarnath, cricketer.
- 20 November – Deva, composer and singer (died 2026)
- 26 November – Abhijit Sen, economist (died 2022)
- 1 December – Manju Bansal, molecular biologist
- 12 December – Rajinikanth, film actor
- 20 December – Abul Kalam Qasmi, Urdu poet and critic (died 2021)
- 30 December – Idris Ali, politician (died 2024)

== Deaths ==
- 14 April – Ramana Maharshi, Ancient Sage of the Modern Era (born 1879).
- 24 June – Darwan Singh Negi, recipient of the Victoria Cross for gallantry in 1914 (born 1881).
- 5 December – Sri Aurobindo, nationalist, scholar, poet, mystic, evolutionary philosopher, yogi and guru (born 1872).
- 15 December – Sardar Vallabhbhai Patel, political and social leader (born 1875).

== See also ==
- Bollywood films of 1950
