= 1955 in India =

- Centuries: 18th; 19th; 20th; 21st
- Decades: 1930s; 1940s; 1950s; 1960s; 1970s
- See also: List of years in India; Timeline of Indian history

Events in the year 1955 in the Republic of India.

== Incumbents ==
=== Federal government ===
- President of India – Rajendra Prasad
- Prime Minister of India – Jawaharlal Nehru
- Vice President of India – Sarvepalli Radhakrishnan
- Chief Justice of India – Bijan Kumar Mukherjea

=== Governors ===
- Andhra Pradesh – Chandulal Madhavlal Trivedi
- Assam – Jairamdas Daulatram
- Bihar – R. R. Diwakar
- Bombay – Harekrushna Mahatab (starting 2 March)
- Jammu and Kashmir – Karan Singh
- Orissa – P. S. Kumaraswamy Raja
- Punjab – Chandeshwar Prasad Narayan Singh
- Rajasthan – Maharaj Man Singh II
- Uttar Pradesh – Kanhaiyalal Maneklal Munshi
- West Bengal – Harendra Coomar Mookerjee

== Events ==
- National income - ₹111,748 million
- The Imperial Bank of India, the oldest (est. 1921) and the largest commercial bank of the Indian subcontinent, was transformed into the State Bank of India.

== Law ==
- The Hindu Marriage Act

== Births ==
- 5 January – Mamata Banerjee, politician
- 27 January – Ratnottama Sengupta, film journalist
- 7 March – Anupam Kher, actor
- 3 April – Hariharan, playback singer
- 11 April – Rohini Hattangadi, actress.
- 2 May – Maharaj Krishan Kaushik, field hockey player and coach. (died 2021)
- 11 May – Keshav Desiraju, civil servant (died 2021)
- 24 May – Rajesh Roshan, music director.
- 22 August – Chiranjeevi Konidela, actor.
- 17 October – Smita Patil, actress (died 1986).
- 5 November – Karan Thapar, television commentator and interviewer.
- 8 November – Pandula Ravindra Babu, politician and member of parliament from Amalapuram.
- 29 November – Rajendrasinh Jadeja, cricketer (died 2021)
- 1 December – Udit Narayan, playback singer
- 12 December – Chandan Mitra, journalist (died 2021)
- 13 December – Manohar Parrikar, politician and Chief Minister of Goa. (died 2019)

== Deaths ==
- 1 January – Shanti Swaroop Bhatnagar, scientist (born 1894).
- 25 April – Zamin Ali, educator and author (born 1893).
- Nobel death day 10 December 1955

== See also ==
- List of Bollywood films of 1955
