= 1948 Guwahati riots =

Ethnic rioting to protest Bengali Hindus

In May 1948, widespread rioting broke out in Guwahati and adjoining areas where Bengali Hindu businesses, schools and residences in general and Bengali Hindu staff of the Bengal and Assam Railway in particular were attacked. The Assamese Hindu nationalists who saw the Bengali Hindus as foreign usurpers in the territory of Assam led the attacks while Muslim League members joined them. The Bengali Hindus were looted and their properties were looted and set on fire. No Bengali-speaking Muslim was attacked, as they were seen as Na Asamiyas who had adopted Assamese language and culture and therefore assimilated in the land Assam. The Guwahati riots mark the beginning of the Bongal Kheda movement.

== Background ==
In June 1947, after the Partition of Bengal, the Government of India shifted the headquarters of Bengal and Assam Railway from Kolkata to Pandu, near Guwahati. Several Bengali Hindu railway staff were transferred from Kolkata to Pandu, Guwahati. Immediately after their arrival, the local Assamese people launched a campaign to drive out the newly arrived Bengali Hindu railway staff and the Bengali Hindu residents of the area. Bengali Hindu residents, especially the Assam Railway staff were attacked in Guwahati and were served notices to quit Assam in 24 hours. Following the Partition of India, several non-Assamese staff of Post and Telegraph, mostly Bengali Hindus, were also transferred to Assam. There was also a steady influx of Bengali Hindus from the Dominion of Pakistan into Assam. Though the Government of Assam was rehabilitating and setting the refugees in the various districts of Assam, there was a strong resentment against the settlement of Bengali refugees in Assam.

On 23 August, a huge public gathering was held by the Ahom Jatiya Mohasabha, where the newly transferred central government officers dubbed as 'foreigners', who had conspired to dominate Assam. The meeting ended with cries of Bongal Kheda (literally meaning 'drive away the Bengali Hindus'). Anti-Bengali Hindu demonstrations followed. On 24 August, a meeting of Assamese Railway Employees' Association presided by Assamese poet Nilmoni Phukan where anti-Bengali sentiment was voiced. The meeting was followed by rowdy demonstrations, anti-Bengali slogans and attacks on Bengali Hindu shops.

== Attacks ==
In the midst of heightened Anti-Bengali Hindu sentiment, physical attacks on the Bengali Hindus started. On the night of 25 April 1948 a Bengali Hindu Railway Medical Service staff was attacked and wounded by an Assamese skilled labourer. On 28 April, a Bengali Hindu worker was beaten up by an Assamese porter of the railway engineering department. In mid-May, the altercations between the Assamese students and Bengali staff and Assam Railway escalated to violence.

On 17 May, the District Railway Traffic Superintendent and one electrical foreman were beaten up by the Assamese students in Uzan Bazaar. On the next day, rioters stopped a shuttle train carrying railway staff from Pandu to Uzan Bazaar Ghat was stopped at Uzan Bazaar and the attacked the railway staff, wounding 8-10 men. The Deputy Commissioner of Police of Guwahati reached the spot with a small contingent and transferred the wounded to hospital. The Bengali Hindu staff of the Bengal and Assam Railway called for general strike and shifted their families from Uzan Bazaar, as it was an Assamese dominated locality. On the morning of 19 May, a few Bengali Hindus were attacked on their way to Uzan Bazaar and looted of everything. The Guwahati Middle English School was burnt down. In the evening, hundreds of Assamese rioters attacked the railway quarters and set them on fire. The Bengali Hindu residents ran away from the quarters to save their lives. The railway police fired on the rioters, wounding a few. Two rioters were critically wounded. Just after that, Bengali Hindu owned departmental stores, diary, pharmacy and jewelry shops were attacked and looted in Pan Bazaar. According to an Anandabazar Patrika report, only the Bengali Hindu owned businesses had been attacked, not a single business owned by the Bengali-speaking Muslims were attacked. At the midnight of 19 May, the Deputy Commissioner of Kamrup District promulgated Section 144 of the CrPC in the Guwahati municipal area and adjoining region, including Pandu for the next 14 days. Assembly of five or more persons or travelling together in any vehicle and carrying arms was prohibited.

On 20 May, the prohibitory orders were violated by a group of Assamese men, who drove across the city in an open lorry, shouting anti-Bengali Hindu slogans. In Pan Bazaar, near the Don Bosco High School, two Bengali Hindus including a Railway Medical Service staff was beaten up. In the evening another similar group of rioters entered Paltan Bazaar and threw brickbats at Bengali Hindu residences and Bengali High School. The attacks also spread to the outskirts of the city. The Bengali Hindus were attacked in Bharalumukh and Kumarpara. 24 persons were wounded and shifted to railway and civil hospitals. The Bengali Hindu families were shifted to safer locations. In spite of police protection, they were attacked in front of the police. On the northern banks of the Brahmaputra, the Bengali Hindu fishermen's villages were set on fire, the flames of which could be seen from Guwahati in the southern bank. The Bengali Hindus kept their businesses shut for the day.

In the evening of 21 May, the Assam Government stated in a press note that Guwahati and adjoining areas have mostly been quiet for the last 24 hours, except a few stray incidents. On the midnight of 22 May, the Assam Government stated in a communique that situation in Guwahati has improved and no incidents took place on that day. 32 people were arrested for rioting till then. On 23 May, in a stray incident, a Bengali medium school was set on fire in Nagaon.

== Protests ==
Paresh Chandra Chowdhury, the secretary of Cachar District Congress Committee and Sunirmal Dutta, general secretary of Surma Sammilani in a joint communique, condemned the inaction of the administration in suppressing the violence. On 19 May, a huge public meeting was held in Silchar, presided by Manipuri leader Dhaneshwar Singh. The speakers at the meeting condemned the provincialism of the Assamese nationalists and called for banning of the Ahom Jatiya Mohasabha. On 20 May, the Assamese employees of the Bengal and Assam Railway Employees' Association held a meeting at Kolkata and condemned the attack on Bengalis in Assam. On 26 May, a huge public meeting was held at Shraddhananda Park in Kolkata, presided by journalist Hemendra Prasad Ghosh, where the speakers blamed the increasing anti-Bengali Hindu hatred for the riots.

== See also ==
- 1960 Goreswar massacre
