= 1946 in India =

- Centuries: 18th; 19th; 20th; 21st
- Decades: 1920s; 1930s; 1940s; 1950s; 1960s
- See also: List of years in India; Timeline of Indian history

Events in the year 1946 in India.

== Incumbents ==
- Emperor of India – George VI
- Viceroy of British India – The Viscount Wavell

== Events ==
- National income - ₹77,566 million

=== January - June ===
- January – 1946 Indian provincial elections
- January – Royal Air Force Mutiny of 1946 of British and Indian air force units
- 11 February – I.N.A. trial demonstrations in Calcutta, several killed
- 12 February – Hartal in Calcutta over the killing of demonstrators the previous day
- 18 February – Start of the Royal Indian Navy Mutiny
- 22 February – Start of hartal in Bombay in support of the mutiny, which saw the British kill over 200 citizens
- 24 March – 1946 Cabinet Mission to India
- 10 May – Nehru elected leader of the Congress Party.

=== July - December ===
- 24 July – Results of 1946 Indian Constituent Assembly election announced
- 16 August – All-India Muslim League calls for Direct Action Day and the resultant violence resulted in more than 3000 deaths.
- 19 August – Violence between Muslims and Hindus in Calcutta leaves 3,000 dead.
- 2 September – interim government formed
- 4 September – Street violence between Muslims and Hindus in Bombay
- 27 November – Prime Minister Jawaharlal Nehru appeals to the United States and the Soviet Union to end nuclear testing and to start nuclear disarmament, stating that such an action would "save humanity from the ultimate disaster."

== Law ==
- 9 December – Constituent Assembly for India meets for the first time.
- Industrial Employment (Standing Orders) Act
- Foreigners Act

== Births ==
=== January to June ===
- 16 January – Kabir Bedi, actor.
- 1 February – Giri Babu, actor.
- 2 March – Morari Bapu, Hindu Kathakaar
- 7 March – Gerald Almeida, bishop of Jabalpur
- 18 March – Navin Nischol, actor of Bollywood films (died 2011).
- 4 June – S. P. Balasubrahmanyam, playback singer and actor (died 2020).

=== July to September ===
- 5 July – Mamukkoya, comedian actor.
- 5 July – Ram Vilas Paswan, politician. (died 2020).
- 17 July – Lalitha Lenin, poet and academic.
- 28 July – Saint Alphonsa, Sister Alphonsa Muttathupadathu, in 2008 became first woman of Indian origin to be canonized as a saint (born 1910).
- 20 August – N. R. Narayana Murthy, industrialist and software engineer.
- 25 September – Bishan Singh Bedi, cricketer (died 2023).

=== October to December ===
- 6 October - Vinod Khanna, actor (died 2017).
- 11 October – Vijay P. Bhatkar, computer scientist.
- 12 October – Ashok Mankad, Test cricketer (died 2008).
- 15 October – Victor Banerjee, actor.
- 9 December – Sonia Gandhi, politician.
- 14 December – Sanjay Gandhi, politician
- 16 October - Naveen Patnaik, politician
- 26 December – Narendra Prasad, actor, playwright, teacher and literary critic (died 2003).

=== Full date unknown ===
- Mani Damodara Chakyar, Kutiyattam and Chakyar Koothu artist.

== Deaths ==
- 6 February – Upendranath Brahmachari, scientist and medical practitioner (born 1873).
- 12 October – Vellakal Palaniapa Subramania Mudaliar, retired veterinary college Dean, landlord, and Tamil scholar (born 1857).
