= 1952 in India =

- Centuries: 18th; 19th; 20th; 21st
- Decades: 1930s; 1940s; 1950s; 1960s; 1970s
- See also: List of years in India; Timeline of Indian history

Events in the year 1952 in the Republic of India.

== Incumbents ==
- President of India – Rajendra Prasad
- Prime Minister of India – Jawaharlal Nehru
- Vice President of India – Sarvepalli Radhakrishnan
- Chief Justice of India – M. Patanjali Sastri

=== Governors ===
- Assam – Jairamdas Daulatram
- Bihar – Madhav Shrihari Aney (until 15 June), R. R. Diwakar (starting 15 June)
- Bombay – Raja Sir Maharaj Singh
- Jammu and Kashmir – Karan Singh
- Orissa – Asaf Ali (until 6 June), Fazal Ali (starting 7 June)
- Punjab – Chandulal Madhavlal Trivedi
- Rajasthan – Maharaj Man Singh II
- Uttar Pradesh – Hormasji Pherozeshah Modi (until 1 June), Kanhaiyalal Maneklal Munshi (starting 1 June)
- West Bengal – Kailash Nath Katju (until 1 November), Harendra Coomar Mookerjee (starting 1 November)

== Events ==
- National income - ₹106,634 million

=== January - June ===
- 21 February - 1951–52 Indian general election concludes.
- 3 April - Rajya Sabha constituted with 216 members and Sarvepalli Radhakrishnan as the Chairman of Rajya Sabha. 12 members were nominated by the President of India and remaining were elected through 1952 Indian Rajya Sabha elections.
- 15 April - The Indian National Congress headed by Jawaharlal Nehru sweeps into power.
- 17 April – Membership of the 1st Lok Sabha starts.
- 13 May – Jawaharlal Nehru forms his first government.
- 13 May – First Lok Sabha, Rajya Sabha session commenced.
- 15 May – G.V. Mavlankar handles the charge as Speaker of the Lok Sabha.
- 30 May – M. A. Ayyangar handles the charge as Lok Sabha Deputy Speaker.

=== June - December ===
- 26 July - Commencement of 1952 Mulkhi Agitation at Warangal.
- 16 October - The first ever Test cricket match of India national cricket team post independence was held at Feroz Shah Kotla Ground against Pakistan national cricket team.
- December - Jawaharlal Nehru's visit to Travancore–Cochin results in commencement of Nehru Trophy Boat Race.
- The commencement of Indo-Norwegian Project.

== Births ==
- 01 January - Shaji N.Karun, filmmaker, producer.
- 18 January – Veerappan, bandit. (died 2004)
- 21 January – Pradeep Rawat, actor.
- 3 February – Deepti Naval, actress.
- 14 February – Sushma Swaraj, politician. (died 2019)
- 19 March – Mohan Babu, actor, producer and politician.
- 31 March – Letika Saran, former Director General of Police, Tamil Nadu, India.
- 1 April – Venki Ramakrishnan, biologist.
- 25 April – Brij Narayan, sarod player.
- 30 May – Ambareesh, actor and politician. (died 2018)
- 20 June – Vikram Seth, poet, novelist, travel writer, librettist, children's writer, biographer and memoirist.
- 23 June – Raj Babbar, actor.
- 27 June – Kamalesh Chandra Chakrabarty, banker. (died 2021)
- 29 July – Harshad Mehta, stockbroker. (died 2001)
- 12 August – Sitaram Yechury, politician (died 2024)
- 25 August – Vijayakanth, actor and politician. (died 2023)
- 4 September – Rishi Kapoor, actor. (died 2020)
- 15 September – K. Vijay Kumar, retired IPS officer.
- 23 September – Anshuman Gaekwad, cricketer. (died 2024)
- 1 October – Sharda Sinha, singer. (died 2024)
- 26 November – Munawwar Rana, poet. (died 2024)
- 27 November – Bappi Lahiri, composer and singer. (died 2022)
- 13 December – Lakshmi, actress.
- 18 December – Noor Alam Khalil Amini, Sunni Muslim scholar. (died 2021)
- 28 December – Hemant Shesh Hindi poet, editor, art critic.

=== Full date unknown ===
- Urvashi Butalia, historian, feminist, and publisher.
- Daisy Irani, actress.
- Deepak Kumar, historian and philosopher of science.

== Deaths ==
- 7 March – Paramahansa Yogananda, yogi and guru (born 1893).
- Rashid Jahan, author, short story writer and playwright (born 1905).

== See also ==
- List of Bollywood films of 1952
