= 1954 in India =

- Centuries: 18th; 19th; 20th; 21st
- Decades: 1930s; 1940s; 1950s; 1960s; 1970s
- See also: List of years in India; Timeline of Indian history

Events in the year 1954 in the Republic of India.

== Incumbents ==
- President of India – Rajendra Prasad
- Prime Minister of India – Jawaharlal Nehru
- Vice President of India – Sarvepalli Radhakrishnan
- Chief Justice of India –
  - until 3 Jan. – M. Patanjali Sastri
  - 4 Jan.-22 Dec. – Mehr Chand Mahajan
  - starting 23 Dec. – Bijan Kumar Mukherjea

=== Governors ===
- Andhra Pradesh – Chandulal Madhavlal Trivedi
- Assam – Jairamdas Daulatram
- Bihar – Madhav Shrihari Aney
- Bombay – Raja Sir Maharaj Singh
- Jammu and Kashmir – Karan Singh
- Orissa – Fazal Ali (until 9 February), P. S. Kumaraswamy Raja (starting 9 February)
- Punjab – Chandulal Madhavlal Trivedi
- Rajasthan – Maharaj Man Singh II
- Uttar Pradesh – Hormasji Peroshaw Mody
- West Bengal – Harendra Coomar Mookerjee

== Events ==
- National income - ₹109,771 million
- 26 January – First Bharat Ratna in India :
  - First recipient: C. Rajagopalachari
  - Second recipient: Sarvepalli Radhakrishnan
  - Third recipient: C. V. Raman
- 15 February - Travancore-Cochin Legislative Assembly election results in majority for Indian National Congress. Travancore Tamil Nadu Congress makes significant gains in Kanyakumari region.
- 22 March – Jayendra Saraswathi becomes the 70th Shankaracharya of Kanchi.
- 4 April – Congress Working Committee set up a subcommittee under Jawaharlal Nehru's chairmanship to examine the working of the Constitution of India.
- 29 April - India and China signs Five Principles of Peaceful Coexistence (Panchsheel).
- 18 May - K. Kamaraj drops the controversial Modified Scheme of Elementary Education introduced by Rajaji in Madras State.
- 8 July - Bhakra-Nangal Dam inaugurated.
- 11 August – Indian annexation of Dadra and Nagar Haveli: Portuguese forces surrender to the Indian SRP.
- Seven killed in police firing in Travancore following agitation by Travancore Tamil Nadu Congress.
- 6 November – Bombay Electricity Board is formed.
- 7 December - National Defence Academy inaugurated at Pune.
- Sahitya Akademi was established in 1954

== Law ==
- 5 July – The Andhra Pradesh High Court is established.

== Births ==
- 11 January – Kailash Satyarthi, Social Reformer, Co-recipient of Nobel Peace Prize 2014
- 25 March – Pinky Lilani, author and businesswoman
- 12 May – Edappadi K. Palaniswami, chief minister of Tamil Nadu 2018.
- 4 July – Manjula Vijayakumar, actress (died 2013).
- 10 July – Malyadri Sriram, politician and member of parliament from Bapatla.
- 14 July
  - Tanikella Bharani, playwright, script writer and actor.
  - R. Sarathkumar, actor and politician.
- 23 July – Nadeem al-Wajidi, Islamic scholar and writer (died 2024).
- 1 August – Baba Gurinder Singh, Fifth and Present Satguru of Radha Soami Satsang Beas.
- 11 August – Yashpal Sharma, cricketer (died 2021).
- 14 September – Shrikant Jichkar, politician (died 2004).
- 15 September – P. Vasu, film director and actor.
- 3 October – Sathyaraj, actor, producer and director.
- 3 November – Laxmikant Berde, comic actor (died 2004).
- 7 November – Kamal Haasan, actor and film director.
- 9 November – Shankar Nag, actor and director (died 1990).

== Deaths ==
- 26 September - Chandrashekhara Bharati III, 34th Jagadguru Shankaracharya of Sringeri (born 1892).
- 22 October – Jibanananda Das, poet, writer, novelist and essayist in Bengali (b. 1899)
- 5 December – Sir Girija Shankar Bajpai, civil servant, diplomat and Governor of Bombay (b. 1891)

== See also ==
- List of Bollywood films of 1954
