= 1951 in India =

- Centuries: 18th; 19th; 20th; 21st
- Decades: 1930s; 1940s; 1950s; 1960s; 1970s
- See also: List of years in India; Timeline of Indian history

Events in the year 1951 in the Republic of India.

== Incumbents ==
- President of India – Rajendra Prasad
- Prime Minister of India – Jawaharlal Nehru
- Chief Justice of India – H. J. Kania (until 6 Nov.), M. Patanjali Sastri (starting 6 Nov.)

=== Governors ===
- Assam: Jairamdas Daulatram
- Bihar: Madhav Shrihari Aney
- Bombay: Raja Sir Maharaj Singh
- Jammu and Kashmir: Yuvraj Karan Singh
- Orissa:
  - Until 5 May: Asaf Ali
  - 6 May–17 July: V. P. Menon
  - starting 17 July: Asaf Ali
- Punjab: Chandulal Madhavlal Trivedi
- Rajasthan: Maharaj Man Singh II
- Uttar Pradesh: Hormasji Pherozeshah Modi
- West Bengal: Kailash Nath Katju (until 1 November), Harendra Coomar Mookerjee (starting 1 November)

== Events ==
- National income - ₹108,633 million
- 4-11 March, First Asian Games held in Delhi.
- 5 November – Central Railway is formed by the merger of several government-owned railways.
- Western Railway is formed by merging smaller railways.
- Central Statistical Organisation is Established.

== Law ==
- 12 March – Patna High Court struck down Bihar Land Reforms Act, ruling it as unconstitutional on the ground that it violated Article 14 of Indian Constitution.
- 2 June – First Amendment of the Constitution of India bill passed in Parliament of India with 228 votes and 20 votes against it.
- 18 June – First Amendment of the Constitution of India says "state can make special provisions for advancement of any backward class"
- 5 October – Supreme Court of India in Sri Sankari Prasad Singh Deo vs Union Of India And State Of Bihar case upheld the First Amendment of the Constitution of India.

== Arts and literature ==
- 16 December – Salar Jung Museum is opened to the public by the Prime Minister of India Jawaharlal Nehru.

== Births ==
- 1 January - Nana Patekar, Indian actor (died 2026)
- 1 March – Nitish Kumar, politician and Chief Minister of Bihar.
- 9 March – Zakir Hussain, tabla player (died 2024)
- 18 May — Jagdeep Dhankhar, politician and 14th Vice President of India
- 26 June – Pusapati Ashok Gajapathi Raju, politician and member of parliament from Vizianagram.
- 3 July – Tabish Mehdi, poet (died 2025)
- 9 July – Nav Bhatia, businessman and superfan of the Toronto Raptors.
- 10 July – Narayanasami Sathyamurthy, scientist.
- 11 July – Naramalli Sivaprasad, politician and member of parliament from Chittoor. (died 2019)
- 30 August – Surajit Sengupta, footballer. (died 2022)
- 7 September – Mammootty, actor
- 25 October – A. V. Vasudevan Potti, poet and lyricist.

== Deaths ==
- 15 February – Stephen Hector Taylor-Smith, rocket scientist (born 1891).
- 23 October – Jagat Singh, Third Satguru of Radha Soami Satsang Beas (born 1884).
- 5 December – Abanindranath Tagore, Indian painter writer (born 1871).

== See also ==
- Bollywood films of 1951
