= 1943 in India =

- Centuries: 18th; 19th; 20th; 21st
- Decades: 1920s; 1930s; 1940s; 1950s; 1960s
- See also: List of years in India; Timeline of Indian history

American officers instructing Chinese task force members in India, 1943.

Events in the year 1943 in India.

== Incumbents ==
- Emperor of India – George VI
- Viceroy of India – Victor Hope, 2nd Marquess of Linlithgow
- Viceroy of India – The Viscount Wavell (from 1 October)

== Events ==
- National income - ₹69,247 million
- Bengal famine of 1943
- 3 February - Howrah Bridge in Calcutta commissioned.
- 10 February – 3 March – Mohandas Gandhi maintains a hunger strike to protest his imprisonment.
- 21 October - Subhas Chandra Bose established Azad Hind at Singapore.
- October - 1943 Madras floods.
- 5 December – The Japanese attack the Port of Kolkata
- 30 December – Subhas Chandra Bose sets up a Pro-Japanese Indian government at Port Blair by hoisting national flag.

== Law ==
- Reciprocity Act
- War Injuries (Compensation Insurance) Act

== Births ==
=== January to June ===
- 1 January – Raghunath Anant Mashelkar, scientist.
- 8 February – Pirzada Qasim, Pakistani poet and academic
- 30 March – J. J. Rawal, astrophysicist and scientific educator.
- 25 April — Devika, actress (d. 2002).
- 17 May – Mangala Narlikar, mathematician (d. 2023)
- 29 May – Enamul Haque, Bangladeshi actor (d. 2021)
- 2 June – Ilaiyaraaja, film composer, singer and lyricist.
- 7 June - Rayapati Sambasiva Rao, politician and member of parliament from Narasaraopet.

=== July to December ===
- 13 July – E. Harikumar, novelist and short story writer. (died 2020)
- 29 July – Manas Bihari Verma, aeronautical scientist. (died 2021)
- 11 August – Pervez Musharraf, President of Pakistan. (died 2023)
- 29 August – Vijayakumar, actor.
- 6 September – P. A. Ibrahim Haji, entrepreneur and philanthropist. (died 2021)
- 23 September – Tanuja, actress of Bollywood films & younger sister of Nutan.
- 21 October – Tariq Ali, Pakistani-British political activist and writer.
- 31 October – G. Madhavan Nair, Chairman of the Indian Space Research Organisation.
- 11 November – Anil Kakodkar, nuclear scientist.

== Deaths ==
- 15 June – Kushal Konwar, Indian National Congress President of Golaghat, First martyr of Quit India Movement
