= Kumarpara =

- Locality
- Location of Kumarpara in Guwahati Kumarpara (Assam)
- Coordinates: 26°10′17.3″N 91°44′10.7″E
- Country: India
- State: Assam
- District: Kamrup Metropolitan district
- List of cities and towns in Assam: Guwahati

Government
  - Type: Municipality
  - Body: Guwahati Municipal Corporation
  - Mayor: Abir Patra (Indian National Congress)
- Demonym: Guwahatian

Languages
  - Official: Assamese, English
- PIN: 781001 & 781009
- Telephone code: +91 - (0) 361 - 24 80 XXX
- ISO 3166 code: IN-AS

Kumarpara is a locality in Guwahati, Assam. It is located to the west of the city and is a very densely populated and cosmopolitan area. The railway line passes at the North end of the locality, and the Assam Trunk Road serves as the northernmost boundary. The localities of Machkhowa, Bharalumukh, Fatasil Ambari and Athgaon surround it. It comes under the Bharalumukh Police Station. The Pin code of Kumarapara is 781 001 (Served by Guwahati GPO) and 781 009 (Served by Bharalumukh Post Office).

== Geography ==
The locality falls within the floodplains of the Brahmaputra and is part of the city of Guwahati. The Assam Truck Road marks the northern boundary, and the Bharalu River marks the southern boundary. The locality served by the Faiz Ahmed Road, or F.A. road, serves as the main road and the KRC road. There are several other arterial roads also. The drainage system consists mostly of the modern drainage system, which was rebuilt recently. An old stream parallel to the F.A. road existed about 40 years ago but has now been mostly filled up by land filling. Also, the locality is free from the problem of flash floods, which most of the other areas of the city suffer from. The Kumarpara panchali is one of the rare intersections found in the city, where five streets meet.

== History ==
The locality is one of the oldest localities of the city of Guwahati, and most families living here can trace their history back hundreds of years. The rich history of the locality has been reflected in many books, such as Smritir Patat Mahanagarar Kumarpara by Md. Hedayat Ullah.

== Places of interest ==
=== Religious Institutions ===
The locality boosts people from almost all major religious communities found in India, and thus, has many religious institutions present here. Some of them are very old and have a rich history. Some of the prominent ones are as follows, besides these, there are numerous others also:-

- Kumarpara Santi Sabha, one of the oldest religious institutions in the locality, celebrated its platinum jubilee in 2013.
- Shiv and Ganesh Mandir.
- Kumarpara Masjid is one of the oldest mosques of Guwahati.

=== Cultural Institutions ===
- Sebak Library, Kumarpara, one of the oldest libraries in Guwahati, and its annual handwritten publication, "Gazali" in Assamese, were enjoyed by all.

=== Educational Institutions ===
The locality has numerous schools that cater to its residents. Besides the schools, there are several tuition centers and coaching institutes spread all over the locality.

- Sishu Niketan High School
- Oakland English High School
- Angels English High School
- Badri Das School
- Eurokids
- Bachpan

=== Sports Institutions ===
The clubs of the locality have a very rich history and have participated in most of the tournaments organised in the city of Guwahati, but due to the rapid growth of infrastructure, the number of sports fields and grounds in the locality has depleted.

- Embrace United Club.
- Nayantara Club hosts the annual Durga Puja, which is famous throughout the state of Assam.
- Jai Hind Club
- kumarpara pin code

=== Financial Institutions ===
- Central Bank of India
- Central Bank Of India, Kumarpara Ifsc Code

=== Financial Facilities ===
- SBI ATM.
- HDFC Bank ATM.
- Union Bank ATM.
- ICICI Bank ATM.
- Axis Bank ATM.
- Kotak Mahindra Bank.
- Central Bank of India

== See also ==
- Chandmari
- Maligaon
- Uzan Bazaar
- Beltola
- Noonmati
- Panbazar
