= 1945 in India =

- Centuries: 18th; 19th; 20th; 21st
- Decades: 1920s; 1930s; 1940s; 1950s; 1960s
- See also: List of years in India; Timeline of Indian history

Events in the year 1945 in India.

== Incumbents ==
- Emperor of India – George VI
- Viceroy of India – Viscount Wavell

== Events ==
- National income - ₹77,736 million
- Detailed Wavell Plan: In May, Wavell visited London and discussed his ideas with the British Government. These London talks resulted in the formulation of a definite plan of action, officially made public simultaneously on 14 June, by L.S.
- 8 May – War ends in Europe, with only fighting left with the Japanese
- 18 August – Subhas Chandra Bose, one of the Indian Freedom movement leaders, presumed dead in a plane crash in Taiwan
- 2nd September – World War II officially ends, and Britain is bankrupt
- 20 September – Mohandas Gandhi and Jawaharlal Nehru demand that British troops leave India, in vain.
- 25 June – Muslim League and congress were invited to the Simla Conference
- 29 November – Bajaj Auto comes into existence.
- All India Council for Technical Education is established

== Law ==
- International Monetary Fund and Bank Act

== Births ==
- 14 January – Surjit Patar, writer and poet (died 2024).
- 17 January – Javed Akhtar, political activist, poet, lyricist and screenwriter.
- 13 February – Vinod Mehra, actor (died 1990).
- 17 March – Esther David, author, artist, and sculptor.
- 1 April – Ali Ahmed Aslam, chef (died 2022).
- 4 May – N. Ram, journalist.
- 20 May – Ibrahim Saeed, journalist, editor and scholar (died 2007).
- 26 May – Vilasrao Deshmukh, politician and former Chief Minister of Maharashtra. (died 2012).
- 16 June – Bikash Sinha, physicist (died 2023).
- 17 June – P. D. T. Achary, civil servant.
- 1 July – Susham Bedi, novelist, poet, and short story writer.
- 2 July – S. A. Chandrasekhar, film director and father of Joseph Vijay.
- 21 July – Ziona, religious leader, head of the largest living family (died 2021)
- 24 July – Azim Premji, businessman.
- 20 August – Abdul Ismail cricketer (died 2025).
- 7 November – Subrahmaniam Nagarajan, wheat pathologist. (died 2016)

== Deaths ==
- 18 August – Subhas Chandra Bose, the most prominent leader of the Indian independence movement (born 1897).
