= 1948 in India =

- Centuries: 18th; 19th; 20th; 21st
- Decades: 1920s; 1930s; 1940s; 1950s; 1960s
- See also: List of years in India; Timeline of Indian history

Events in the year 1948 in India.

== Incumbents ==
- King of India – George VI
- Governor-General of the Dominion of India – Lord Mountbatten of Burma
- Governor-General of the Dominion of India – C. Rajagopalachari (from 21 June)
- Prime Minister of India – Jawaharlal Nehru

== Events ==
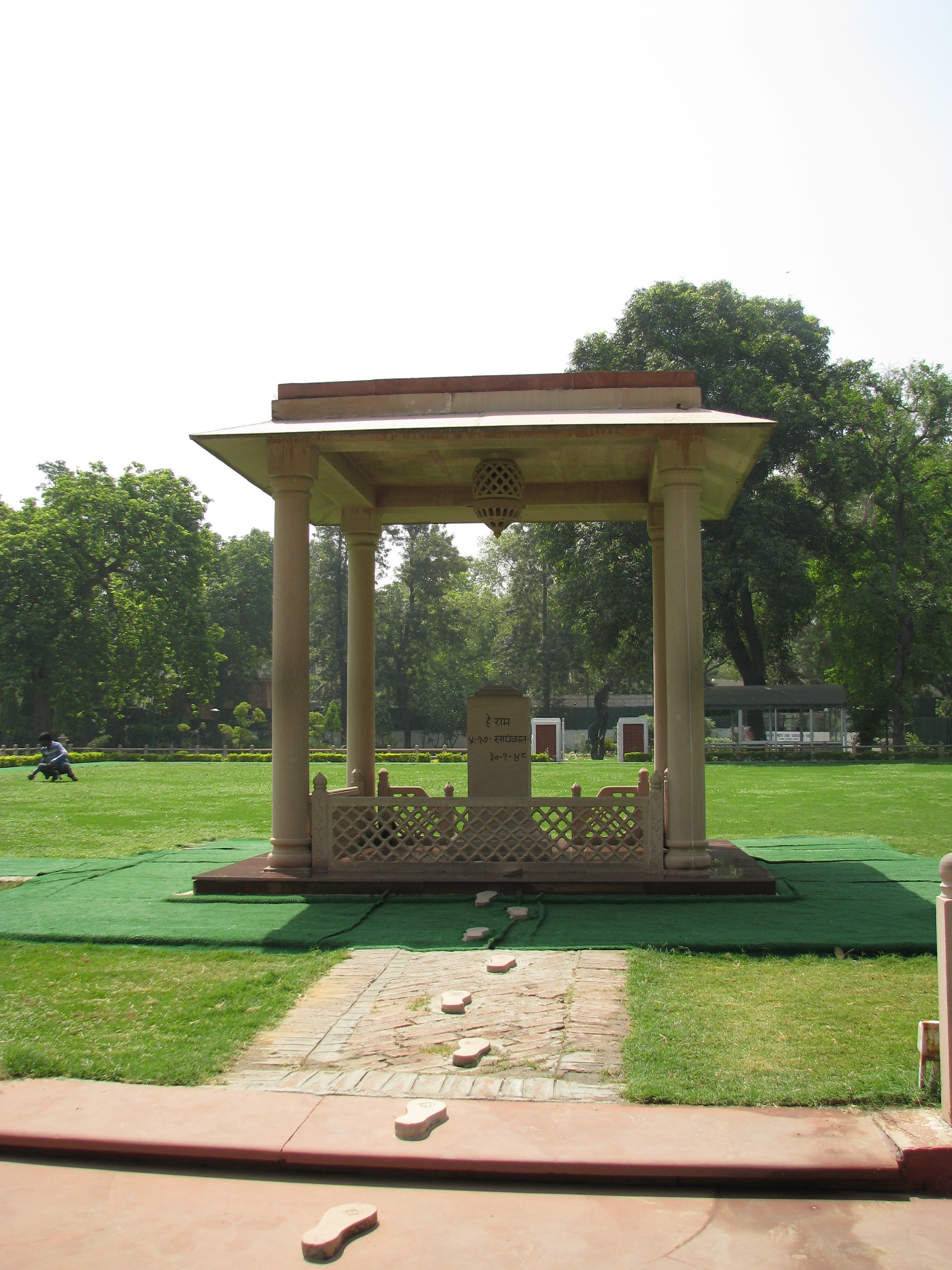
Assassination of Mohandas Karamchand Gandhi: The Martyr's Column at the Gandhi Smriti, (Birla House), the spot where Gandhi was assassinated.

- National income - ₹93,590 million
- 1 January - India decides to take Kashmir issue to United Nations.
- 13-19 January - The last fasting of Gandhiji.
- 30 January – Assassination of Mahatma Gandhi: The freedom fighter, a leader of India, Mahatma Gandhi is assassinated by Hindutva proponent Nathuram Godse.
- 15 February – Junagadh and Manavadar (princely state) rescinds accession to Pakistan, and accedes to India.
- 20 February - 15 Deccan states agree to integrate with Bombay province.
- 24 February – A plebiscite conducted in Junagadh State on which 99% approves accession to India.
- 8 March - Princely state of Jath accedes to India
- 10 March - Inaugural meeting of Indian Union Muslim League held at Madras.
- 17 March Matsya States Union formed.
- 15 April – Mandi District was formed by the amalgamation of the erstwhile princely states of Mandi and Suket on the formation of Himachal Pradesh.
- 25 April – start of the violence that would begin the 1948 Guwahati riots
- 1 May – First Kashmir War, India confronts the aggressors and fights the Indo-Pakistani War of 1947 and is engaged with the Dominion of Pakistan for the first time.
- 7 July - Damodar Valley Corporation created.
- 15 July - Patiala and East Punjab States Union formed.
- 19 July - Permit system came into force for migrants from West Pakistan.
- 6 September – The Nizam of Hyderabad in Deccan having failed to retain independence decides to accede to the Dominion of Pakistan. Pakistan takes the case to the UN, pending resolutions regarding the issue.
- 12 September - Dominion of India launches Operation Polo on Hyderabad.
- 18 September – State of Hyderabad joins the Dominion of India

== Law ==
- Factories Act
- Minimum Wages Act
- Pharmacy Act
- Employees' State Insurance Act
- Insurance Act
- Expiring Laws Continuance Act
- Dock Workers (Regulation Of Employment) Act
- Territorial Army Act
- Census Act
- Dentists Act
- Diplomatic and Consular Officers (Oaths and Fees) Act
- Central Silk Board Act
- Rehabilitation Finance Administration Act
- Industrial Finance Corporation Act
- Coal Mines Provident Fund and Miscellaneous Provisions Act
- Oilfields (Regulation and Development) Act
- Reserve Bank (Transfer to Public Ownership) Act
- National Cadet Corps Act
- Electricity (Supply) Act
- Mines and Minerals (Regulation and Development) Act
- Resettlement Of Displaced Persons (Land Acquisition) Act

== Births ==
- 7 January – Shobhaa De, columnist and novelist.
- 24 February – J. Jayalalithaa, actress, politician, Chief Minister of Tamil Nadu. (died 2016)
- 25 February – Danny Denzongpa, actor.
- 1 March – Gopanarayan Das, advocate and politician (died 2022).
- 3 April – Banu Mushtaq, writer.
- 9 April – Jaya Bachchan, actress.
- 3 May – S. Ramesan Nair, lyricist and poet (died 2021).
- 10 June – Subrata Roy, businessman (died 2023).
- 14 June – Gokaraju Ganga Raju, politician and member of parliament from Narasapuram.
- 27 June – Vennira Aadai Nirmala, Tamil actress
- 4 September –Anant Nag, actor and politician.
- 10 September – Bhakti Barve, actress (died 2001).
- 2 October – Persis Khambatta, actress and model (died 1998).
- 16 October – Hema Malini, actress and dancer-choreographer.
- 14 November – Sindhutai Sapkal, social worker and social activist (died 2022).
- 30 November – K. R. Vijaya, actress.

=== Full date unknown ===
- Abdul Aleem Farooqui, Islamic scholar (died 2024)

== Deaths ==
- 30 January – Mohandas Karamchand Gandhi, political and spiritual leader in India and the Indian independence movement, assassinated (born 1869).
- 1 February – Jatindramohan Bagchi, poet (born 1878).
- 2 April - Baba Sawan Singh, Second Satguru of Radha Soami Satsang Beas (born 1858).
- 9 August – Yellapragada Subbarow, medical scientist (born 1895).
- 19 August - P. Krishna Pillai, communist revolutionary. (b. 1906)

== See also ==
- Bollywood films of 1948
