= 1949 in India =

- Centuries: 18th; 19th; 20th; 21st
- Decades: 1920s; 1930s; 1940s; 1950s; 1960s
- See also: List of years in India; Timeline of Indian history

Events in the year 1949 in India.

== Incumbents ==
- King of India – George VI
- Governor-General of the Dominion of India – C. Rajagopalachari
- Prime Minister of India – Jawaharlal Nehru

== Events ==
- National income - ₹92,908 million

=== January - June ===
- 1 January –
  - After one year and few months of fighting between the Indian forces and the Pakistan Army agreed to a ceasefire, ordered by the United Nations Security Council, takes effect in Kashmir region.
  - The Reserve Bank of India was nationalized.
- 20-23 January - An international Conference of 19 nations took place in New Delhi for Indonesian National Revolution.
- 30 March - Fifteen Princely states joined the Union of India to form the state of Rajasthan.
- 28 April – India issues the London Declaration, enabling it (and, thereafter, any other nation) to remain in the British Commonwealth despite becoming a republic, creating the position of 'Head of the Commonwealth', and renaming the organisation as the 'Commonwealth of Nations'.
- 25 May - Kollam Textile Mill strike by United Trade Union Congress demanding payment of bonus to workers.
- 6 June – With the passage of the Bodh Gaya Temple Act by the Indian government, Mahabodhi Temple is restored to partial Buddhist control.

=== July - September ===
- 1 July - Princely state of Travancore and Kingdom of Cochin together formed the state of Travancore–Cochin.
- 12 July - 1949 Bombay KLM Constellation crash
- 27 July – India and Pakistan sign the Karachi Agreement
- 9 September – Queen Kanchanprabha Devi signs the Tripura Merger Agreement.
- 17 September - Dravida Munnetra Kazhagam a linguistic regional party based in Tamil Nadu formed.
- 18 September - Indian rupee suffers devaluation due to 30% devaluation of Pound sterling by Chancellor of the Exchequer.
- 21 September - Manipur (princely state) merges with India following agreement between V. P. Menon and Bodhchandra Singh.

=== October - December ===
- 11 October - Prime Minister of India Jawaharlal Nehru arrived at Washington, D.C. for a three week visit in United States and was received by Harry S. Truman.
- 15 October – Tripura becomes a part of the Union of India
- 15 November – Nathuram Godse and Narayan Apte executed for assassinating Mahatma Gandhi.
- 26 November - Constituent Assembly of India adopted the Constitution of India.
- 22 December - Planting of ram idol inside Babri Masjid by Abhiram Das.
- 28 December – Central Reserve Police Force Act enacted.
- 31 December - An armed group of Communist Party of India activists killed four Police officers in Travancore–Cochin.

== Law ==
- Constitution is adopted by the Indian Constituent Assembly.
- Central Reserve Police Force Act
- Electricity Act
- Police Act
- Banking Regulation Act
- Maharaja Sayajirao University of Baroda Act
- Industrial Disputes (Banking and Insurance Companies) Act
- Central Reserve Police Force Act
- Mangrol and Manavadar (Administration of Property) Act
- Seaward Artillery Practice Act
- Chartered Accountants Act
- Payment Of Taxes (Transfer Of Property) Act
- Abducted Persons (Recovery and Restoration) Act

== Births ==
- 1 January – Nana Patekar, actor and filmmaker.
- 13 January – Rakesh Sharma, Indian Air Force pilot and cosmonaut.
- 16 February – Milind Rege, cricket player and selector (died 2025).
- 7 March – Ghulam Nabi Azad, politician.
- 4 April – Parveen Babi, actress (died 2005).
- 1 June
  - T. M. Abraham, theatre director.
  - Gautam Chattopadhyay, musicologist and film maker, founder member of Moheener Ghoraguli. (died 1999).
- 29 June – A. Anwhar Raajhaa, politician.
- 10 July – Sunil Gavaskar, cricketer.
- 21 August – Ahmed Patel, politician (died 2020).
- 23 August – Bansi Kaul, theatre director (died 2021).
- 30 October – Pramod Mahajan, politician (died 2006).
- 12 December – Gopinath Munde, politician (died 2014).

== Deaths ==
- 2 March - Sarojini Naidu, Activism, (aged 70 years)
- 6 April – Narendra Nath Dutta, physician (born 1884)
- 10 April – Birbal Sahni, paleobotanist (born 1891).
- 19 June – Syed Zafarul Hasan, Muslim philosopher (born 1885).
- 15 November – Narayan Apte, accomplice in assassination of Mahatma Gandhi, executed (born 1911).
- 15 November – Nathuram Godse, assassin of Mahatma Gandhi, executed (born 1910).

== See also ==
- Bollywood films of 1949
