= Swarna Rani Mandir, Sursand =

Hindu temple in Mithila

Swarna Rani Mandir
- स्वर्ण रानी मंदिर

Religion
- Affiliation: Hinduism
- Deity: Rama, Sita, and several others

Location
- Location: Sursand, Sitamarhi
- State: Bihar
- Country: India

Architecture
- Type: Domes shaped Hindu temple
- Founder: Rajvanshi Kunwar
- Established: 18th century
- Completed: 1759

Swarna Rani Mandir (Maithili: स्वर्ण रानी मंदिर) is a Hindu temple in the region of Mithila. It is located in the town of Sursand in Sitamarhi district, Bihar, India. It is known for its architectural design and structure, including its carved pillars. It was built in the 18th century by then-Queen Rajvanshi Kunwar of the Sursand Raj. The temple is also known as Swarna Rani Sati Mandir or simply Rani Mandir. According to local legend, it is known as Shree Rani Sati Dadi Mandir.

== Architecture ==
The temple is built on about one and a half acres of land. It has five huge domes on the top of the temple. The height of the temple is 70 feet.

== History ==
The Swarna Rani Mandir was built in the year 1759. During the consecration the temple, golden statues of several deities, including Rama and Janaki, were installed at the temple.

In 1942, some domes of the temple were destroyed by an earthquake in the region. Another earthquake in 1987 destroyed several parts of the remaining foundations of the temple. The temple subsequently fell into disrepair and was gradually forgotten.
