= 1947 in India =

- Centuries: 18th; 19th; 20th; 21st
- Decades: 1920s; 1930s; 1940s; 1950s; 1960s
- See also: List of years in India; Timeline of Indian history

The year 1947 was a turning point in Indian history, marking the end of the British Raj. On August 15, 1947, India gained independence, leading to the creation of the Dominion of India, which in 1950 would establish the Sovereign, Democratic, Republic of India.

The year also witnessed the Rawalpindi Massacres, Partition of India, Jammu Massacres and violence against women. This culminated in creation of Pakistan and triggered one of the largest mass migrations in history.

== Incumbents ==
- Emperor of India – George VI until 15 August
- King of India – George VI from 15 August
- Viceroy of India – The Viscount Wavell (until 21st February)
- Viceroy of India – The Viscount Mountbatten of Burma (21 February – 15 August)
- Governor-General of the Union of India – The Viscount Mountbatten of Burma (from 16 August)
- Prime Minister of India – Jawaharlal Nehru

== Events ==
- National income - ₹85,101 million

=== January - June ===
- 20 February - Clement Attlee informs of decision to leave India by 1948.
- 1 March - Partition of India is finalised by Lord Mountbatten. Boundary Commission under Sir Radcliffe was set up to partition Punjab & Bengal.
- 2 March - Sir Khizar Hayat Tiwana, leader of the Unionist Party (Punjab) and Premier of pre-Partition Punjab, resigns in protest against the Partition.
- 5 March - On the eve of Hindu festival of Holi, armed Muslim mobs started attacking Hindus and Sikhs in several cities of West Punjab, including the cantonment town of Rawalpindi and Multan, killing close to 200 in the latter with the casualties being mostly Hindu. This marked the beginning of the 1947 Rawalpindi massacres.
- 15 March – Hindus and Muslims clash in Punjab.
- 15 March - Lord Mountbatten attempts his first effort to stop the Partition of Bengal & conduct the partition of Muslim majority Kashmir.
- 16 March - Maharaja Hari Singh of Kashmir disapproves of Lord Mountbatten's proposal.
- 22 March - Lord Mountbatten arrives in India.
- 25 March - Lord Mountbatten attempts his second effort to stop the Partition of Bengal & conduct the partition of Muslim-majority Kashmir.
- 26 March - Jawaharlal Nehru disapproves of Lord Mountbatten's proposal but Muhammad Ali Jinnah accepts the proposal of Lord Mountbatten.
- 2 April - Lord Mountbatten attempts his third effort to stop the Partition of Bengal & conduct the partition of Muslim-majority Kashmir. Gandhi starts his fast to keep India united.
- 5 April - Talks on stopping the Partition of Bengal & conducting the partition of Muslim-majority Kashmir fails as Jawaharlal Nehru & Maharaja Hari Singh disapprove of Lord Mountbatten's proposal. Proposal stands 2-1 in favour of the Partition of Bengal.
- 15 April - On the Bengali new year's day, Lord Mountbatten attempts his last ditch effort to stop the Partition of Bengal & conduct the partition of Muslim-majority Kashmir. Sir Radcliffe lends support to Lord Mountbatten as the proposal stands tied 2-2.
- 1 May - Shyama Prasad Mukherjee writes to Lord Mountbatten & Sir Radcliffe demanding a plebiscite to decide on the Partition of Bengal. Proposal stands 3-2 in favour of the Partition of Bengal. Lord Mountbatten comments "The Partition of Kashmir would have saved India-Pakistan conflicts. But it's hopeless as the India-Pakistan conflict will never end on Kashmir"
- 17 May – Tripura & Coochbehar are officially ceded to India after 200 years of independent rule.
- 18 May - Gandhi gives approval to the Partition of India after massive riots break out in Punjab & Bengal
- 23 May - The Partition of Bengal was finalized. West Bengal was slated to have Jessore, Khulna, Barisal, & Dinajpur Districts along with other Western districts of Undivided Bengal. A Total of 110,000 square kilometres (42,000 sq mi) area was given to West Bengal.
- 31 May - First Illegal Plebiscite to decide on the Partition of Bengal happens. Kolkata, Sunderbans, Murshidabad, Malda, Jessore, Khulna, Barisal, Kushtia, Pabna, Rajshahi, & Rangpur divisions of Bengal vote.
- 1 June - Second Illegal Plebiscite to decide on the Partition of Bengal happens. Dhaka, Mymensingh, Sylhet, & Chattogram (Chittagong) vote in favour of joining East Pakistan.
- 4 June - Shyama Prasad Mukherjee participated despite Dr. Bidhan Chandra Roy pleading him not to participate. Mukherjee loses the Plebiscite. He becomes runner-up even after Fazlull Haque, the candidate of Muslim League abstained. The Muslim League then started Second Direct Action Day in Kolkata, to get Kolkata, Sundarbans, Murshidabad, Malda, Jessore, Khulna, Barisal, Kushtia, Pabna, Rajshahi, & Rangpur divisions to join East Pakistan. 1000-5000 people killed in Kolkata Riots on 4 June 1947. Again after 16 August 1946, Gopal Chandra Mukherjee also known as Gopal Patha, his aides Gopalnath Bhattacharya also known as Boro Gopal, & Chandi Upadhyay, cousin brother of Deendayal Upadhyay raided the second head office of Muslim League in Kolkata with 20,000 people to save Kolkata, Sundarbans, Jessore, Khulna, & Barisal from going into East Pakistan. All Muslim League leaders abandon second head office in Kolkata & flee to Dhaka.
- 7 June - Malda & Murshidabad, which were given to East Pakistan, were forcibly swapped with Jessore, Khulna, & Barisal. Kolkata was saved & Sundarbans was divided between India & East Pakistan. West Bengal lost 15,000 square kilometres (5,800 sq mi) due to this Illegal Plebiscite, became 95,000 square kilometres (37,000 sq mi) area. This was a huge mistake done by Shyama Prasad Mukherjee by participating in the Illegal Kolkata plebiscite, falling in trap of Muslim League.

=== July - December ===
- July - August – 1947 Pakistani Constituent Assembly election
- 5 July- The Indian Independence Act was passed by the British Parliament.
- 18 July- The Indian Independence Act received royal assent from the then British monarch, George VI.
- 30 July - Travancore formally agrees to join Dominion of India.
- 7 August – The Bombay Municipal Corporation formally takes over the Bombay Electric Supply and Transport (BEST).
- 15 August – British India is dissolved and the Dominion of India gains its independence from the United Kingdom. A largely Hindu India and a Muslim Pakistan are created by partitions of the subcontinent, with Punjab and Bengal divided along religious-demographic boundaries between the two. Hindu – Muslim riots break out along both the western and eastern borders. Mass transfer of refugees takes place from the successor states of India to Pakistan and vice versa. The monarch of Kashmir signs instrument of accession with India in the face of heavy attack from Pakistani tribals, but at the same time he had signed a Standstill agreement with Pakistan. Mountbatten remains the Governor-general of India as wished by the Indians and Jawaharlal Nehru becomes the first Prime Minister of India. Nehru unfurls the Indian tricolor on the ramparts of the Red Fort, symbolically marking the end of British colonial rule.
- August – October – Thousands massacred & 1 million migrations in Punjab.
- 13 September – Prime Minister Nehru suggests the transfer of 10 million Hindus and Muslims between India and Pakistan.
- 27 October – War breaks out between Indian and Pakistani forces in Kashmir.
- 9 November – Junagadh joins the Dominion of India
- 15 December - Fifteen states join Orissa Province
- 16 December - Eleven Chhattisgarhi states join Central Provinces and Berar.

== Law ==
- 10 August - Boundary Commission under Sir Radcliffe finally partitioned India. 300,000 square kilometres (120,000 sq mi) of area in Punjab got divided with 204,250 square kilometres (78,860 sq mi) going to West Pakistan (Only Pakistan since 1971). Remaining 95,750 square kilometres (36,970 sq mi) joins India as East Punjab. 250,000 square kilometres (97,000 sq mi) of area in Bengal got divided with 147,750 square kilometres (57,050 sq mi) going to East Pakistan (Bangladesh since 1971). Remaining 102,250 square kilometres (39,480 sq mi) joins India as West Bengal. (Later West Bengal lost 13,498 square kilometres (5,212 sq mi) more area to Bihar, Assam, & Odisha in 1948-53).
- Indian Independence Act
- Industrial Disputes Act
- Gauhati University Act
- Roorkee University Act
- Rubber (Production and Marketing) Act
- Indian Nursing Council Act
- Foreign Exchange Regulation Act
- Armed Forces (Emergency Duties) Act
- United Nations (Security Council) Act
- United Nations (Privileges and Immunities) Act

== Births ==
- 8 January – Harish Naval, international literary journal chief editor.
- 2 June – Saint Jarnail Singh Bhindranwale, Sikh theologian and leader (died 1984).
- 19 June – Salman Rushdie, novelist.
- 1 July – Sharad Yadav, politician (died 2023)
- 5 July – Lalji Singh, molecular biologist. (died 2017).
- 6 August – Srinivasa Prasad, politician (died 2024).
- 15 August – Raakhee, Bollywood actress.
- 17 October – Simi Garewal, actress.

== Deaths ==
- 13 May – Sukanta Bhattacharya, Bengali poet (born 1926).

== See also ==
- Bollywood films of 1947

== Bibliography ==
- Constitutionofindia.net (20 April 2025). "This Month in Constitution-Making (February 1947): Britain Announces …".
- Ahmed, Ishtiaq (2011). The Punjab Bloodied, Partitioned and Cleansed: Unravelling the 1947 Tragedy through Secret British Reports and First-Person Accounts. Rupa/OUP Pakistan. ISBN 978-93-5520-578-0. ISBN 978-0-19-906470-0.
- Hajari, Nisid (2015). Midnight's Furies: The Deadly Legacy of India's Partition. Houghton Mifflin Harcourt. ISBN 978-0-547-66924-3.
- The Tribune (20 April 2025). "Remembering Khizar Hayat Tiwana".
- Firstpost (20 April 2025). "History Today: How Lord Mountbatten was appointed last viceroy and oversaw India's independence".
