= Shantipur (disambiguation) =

Shantipur or Santipur is a city and a municipality in Nadia district in the Indian state of West Bengal.

These place names may also refer to:

India

- Santipur (Vidhan Sabha constituency), the assembly constituency of Shantipur, West Bengal
- Santipur (community development block), an administrative division in Ranaghat subdivision of Nadia district in West Bengal
- Santipur, Guwahati, a locality in Guwahati near the south bank of the river Brahmaputra
- Shantipur, Purba Medinipur, a census town in Sahid Matangini CD Block, Purba Medinipur district, West Bengal

Nepal

- Shantipur, Janakpur
- Shantipur, Lumbini
- Shantipur, Mechi
