= Russi Mody =

Indian businessman

Russi Modi
- Born: 17 January 1918; Bombay, Bombay Presidency, British India
- Died: 16 May 2014 (aged 96); Kolkata, India
- Education: Oxford
- Occupation: Chairman of Tata Steel from 1984 to 1993
- Spouse: Siloo Russi Mody
- Parent(s): Sir Homi Mody and Lady Jerbhai

Rustomji Homusji Mody, known to most as Russi Mody (17 January 1918 – 16 May 2014), was a chairman and managing director of Tata Steel and a leading member of the Tata Group.

== Early years ==
Russi was born on 17 January 1918 in Bombay (now Mumbai) to a Parsi family. His father was Sir Homi Mody. His mother was Lady Jerbai Mody née Dubash. Russi had two brothers, Kali Homi Mody and Piloo Mody.

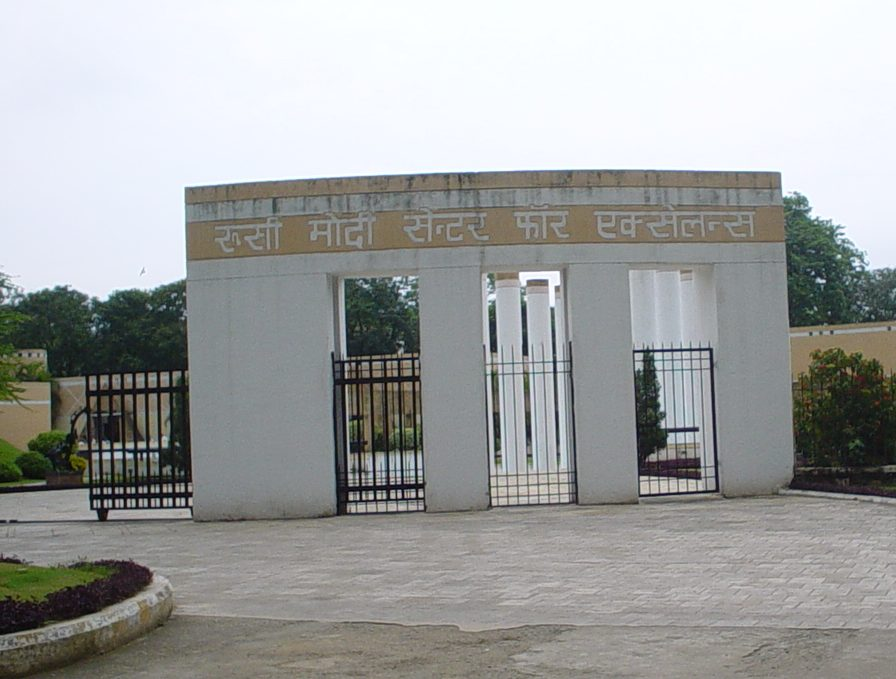
Russi Mody Centre Of Excellence

After a few years of schooling in India, he was sent to England for further studies. He studied at St Cyprian's School, Harrow School and later at Christ Church, Oxford. On his return to India, he joined Tata Steel as an office assistant.

Russi was married to Siloo Mugaseth, the daughter of his mother's sister, and lived in Kolkata until his death.

== Career ==
Mody joined Tata Steel in 1939, and he was promoted to the position of director of personnel in 1953. He took up the position of director of raw materials in 1965. In 1970, he was appointed director of operations and became joint managing director in 1972. He was the most generous managing director of Tata Steel Ltd. He started many rewards, like giving an AC Maruti Suzuki 800 to all divisional managers of Tata Steel. He never faced a strike at the Tata Steel Plant.

After retiring from Tata Steel in March 1993, the then prime minister of India, Shri P V Narasimha Rao appointed Mody as joint chairman of Indian Airlines and Air India.

Russi Mody Centre for Excellence, built by noted architect Hafeez Contractor that contains archives of the Tata Group, was named after him.

== Anecdotes ==
Hearsay has it that Russi Mody was pulled up by a policeman as he tried to park his car on the narrow road. Admonished with "Tumhara baap ka rasta hain kya?" ("Does this road belong to your father?") the young scion pointed in good humour to the road sign indeed printed with the distinguished paternal name.

He was also known to eat a 16-egg omelette for breakfast.

During his studies at Oxford, he happened to accompany Albert Einstein on the violin while he played the piano.

Once, Sir Jehangir Ghandy was scheduled to come to Calcutta on a Wednesday afternoon when he would normally play tennis. In his diary lying on the table, he wrote, "TPT CSC meeting on Wednesday at 3 pm," and told his secretaries to take Sir Jehangir to his room, show him the diary and say that Russi had gone to the meeting. True enough, Sir Jehangir came and was shown the diary. He nodded knowledgeably and walked away. Little did he know that TPT CSC was an abbreviation of "To Play Tennis at Calcutta South Club".

== Award ==
- Padma Bhushan (1989)

== Death ==
Mody died during the night of 16 May 2014 at a private hospital in Kolkata.

== Books ==
- Russi Modi: The Man who also made Steel
- Russi Modi: The Man And His Vision

== See also ==
- Up, close and intimate with Russi Mody
