= 1942 in India =

- Centuries: 18th; 19th; 20th; 21st
- Decades: 1920s; 1930s; 1940s; 1950s; 1960s
- See also: List of years in India; Timeline of Indian history

Events in the year 1942 in India.

== Incumbents ==
- Emperor of India – George VI
- Viceroy of India – Victor Hope, 2nd Marquess of Linlithgow

== Events ==
- Formation of INA
- National income - ₹56,597 million
- February – Visit of Generalissimo Chiang Kai Shek of China (Commander of Allied forces for Asia China sector) amidst impending pressure of Japanese attack on Burma. Meets Congress top leaders to seek India's participation in war.
- 8 Mar – Japanese army enters Rangoon. British necessity to break Indian political deadlock.
- 22 Mar – Arrival of The Cripps mission, proposals /declaration made public on 30 Mar but are rejected by Congress and all other parties except Muslim League.
- 14 July- Wardha working committee meeting reiterated demand for Britons leaving India.
- 8 August – Quit India resolution was passed by the Bombay session of the AICC, which led to the start of a historical civil disobedience movement across India.
- 9 August – Indian leader, Mohandas Gandhi is arrested in Bombay by British forces.
- August – Newly married couple Indira Gandhi and Feroze Gandhi are arrested for their participation in Quit India movement.
- 16 October – Hurricane and flooding in Bombay: 40,000 dead.
- December – Many demonstrators were lathi-charged and assassinated. By December, over 60,000 people had been jailed.
- Formation of INA
- Flag Hosting- An Indian Freedom Fighter Dr. Shivpujan Rai, Rishishewar Rai, Vans Narayan Rai, Ram Badan Upadhyay, Raj Narayan Rai, Narayan Rai, Vashishtha Narain Rai and Bans Narain Rai sacrificed their life for India's Independence on 18 August 1942 by hosting flag of India at Mohammadabad Tehsil. All of them known as the Ashta Shaheed (Eight Martyrs) of Sherpur (Ghazipur).

== Law ==
- Coffee Market Expansion Act

== Births ==
- 13 January – Yogesh Kumar Sabharwal, Chief Justice of India (died 2015).
- 10 February – Madhabi Mukherjee, actress.
- 21 February – Jayshree Gadkar, actress (died 2008).
- 11 March – Amarinder Singh, politician and current Chief Minister of Punjab.
- 2 April – Roshan Seth, actor.
- 7 April – Jeetendra, actor.
- 15 April – Madhur Kapila, novelist, journalist and art critic (died 2021)
- 25 May – Dr. Sri Ganapathy Sachchidananda Swamiji
- 1 June – Parveen Kumar, medical scientist
- 30 June – Matia Chowdhury, Bangladeshi politician (d. 2024)
- 2 July – Abdullah Al Noman, Bangladeshi politician (d. 2025)
- 7 July – Abdul Hamid II, Pakistani hockey player.
- 19 August – Bungle Shama Rao Dwarakanath, actor.
- 20 September – Rajinder Goel, cricketer (d. 2020)
- 2 October – Asha Parekh, actress, director and producer.
- 11 October – Amitabh Bachchan, actor.
- 26 October – Roger Bhatnagar, Indian-born New Zealand businessman (died 2022)
- 18 December – Jagdish Khattar, businessman and civil servant (died 2021)
- 29 December – Rajesh Khanna, actor. (died 2012).

== Deaths ==
- 24 April – Deenanath Mangeshkar, actor, musician and singer (born 1900).
