= Sarana Chatushtai =

Within Indian classical music for Shruti, Sarana Chatushtai is an experiment. The purpose is to obtain the correct physical configuration of Śruti swara arrangement to Shadja Grama Notes on a veena instrument (Sa, Ri, Ga, Ma, Pa, Dha, Ni corresponding to 4-3-2-4-4-3-2 totalling 22 Srutis in a Saptak). The experiment is described in Abhinavabharati, a commentary to Natya Shastra, as an explanation after verse 28.26 of Natyashastra. The 22 Srutis are the only notes which can be useful for music in an “octave”, in this view. The sections below describe the experiment.

== Sarana Chatushtai experiment on two similar sitars ==
The two veenas having the same qualities in all respect can be used to perform the Sarana Chatushtai experiment. Establish the Shadjagrama on both the similar sitars as per the methodology explained in Natya Shastra chapter 28 to keep shruties distance wise for the respective notes of the shadjagrama. Now we can measure the sruti value and hence provide 22 frets starting from the 5th sruti of second note "Re". The assumption here which needs to be made to realize Bharata Muni's shruti of first datum note being the sound of free string Sa, requires the assumption of 4 virtual shruties of Sa which are actually obtained in the higher octave after Ni. This assumption though not explicitly stated in the Natya Shastra needs to be made as was discovered by Avinash Balkrishna Patwardhan and is required to prove the Sarana Chatushtai experiment. The shruti distances as per the compression factors are calculated for all the 34" length of the string. 18 frets are required to reach up to the end note Ni of the saptak in both the instruments. When finally both the instruments are set in the Shadjagrama, one sitar is to be kept as "Achala" (Achala means that which does not change) i.e. the string tuning of this instrument remains unchanged during the entire experiment, whereas the other sitar is named as "Chala" i.e. the changes in tuning strings during the experiment are to be performed on this sitar (Chala means that which could change). The Panchama note of this Chala sitar is to be lowered by one "Pramana-Shruti" that is to bring this sitar in the Madhyamagrama. The procedure of Bharata states that the Achala sitar Re note is first played as Sa note and the Pa note of the Chala sitar is lowered down in sound to be played as Ma note of the Achala sitar's Re note(assumed as Sa note).

=== Sarana 1 ===
Setting the Chala sitar in the Madhyamagrama by lowering the Pa note by one Pramana Shruti is the first part of the first Sarana. The concept of Praman Sruti is the main theory we get from the first sarana. The next part is to sound the Chala sitar to Shadjagrama tune. Here all notes on the Chala sitar will sound less by one Pramana shruti than the notes on the permanently set Achala sitar in the Shadjagrama.

=== Sarana 2 ===
Repeat the above-mentioned procedure to further lower down the Chala sitar by one more Pramana Sruti. Here we find when asked to play both the instruments, then the Ga note of Chala sitar will exactly match in tune or rather merge with the Re note of the Achala sitar, and the Ni note of Chala instrument merges with the Dha note of the Achala sitar. Here we get the pair of 2 shruti values.

=== Sarana 3 ===
Repeat the above procedure once again and further lower down the Chala sitar by one more sruti in shadjagrama. Now the difference in both the instruments set in Shadjagrama is of 3 Pramana Shruti values. Here we see the notes Sa and Pa of Achala sitar will merge in Re & Dha notes of Chala sitar.

=== Sarana 4 ===
Repeat this procedure once again to finally bring down the Chala sitar lower by 4 sruties than the Achala sitar initially set in Shadjagrama. Here we find the notes Ni, Ga, Ma of Achala sitar are found merging in the notes Sa, Ma and Pa of the Chala sitar respectively.

Only when all 4 sarana’s are successfully tuned and the sound notes cross checked as mentioned by Bharata, then only one can know the 22 shrutis of Shadjagrama as required by the Natya Shastra.
