= Piloo Mody =

Indian architect and politician

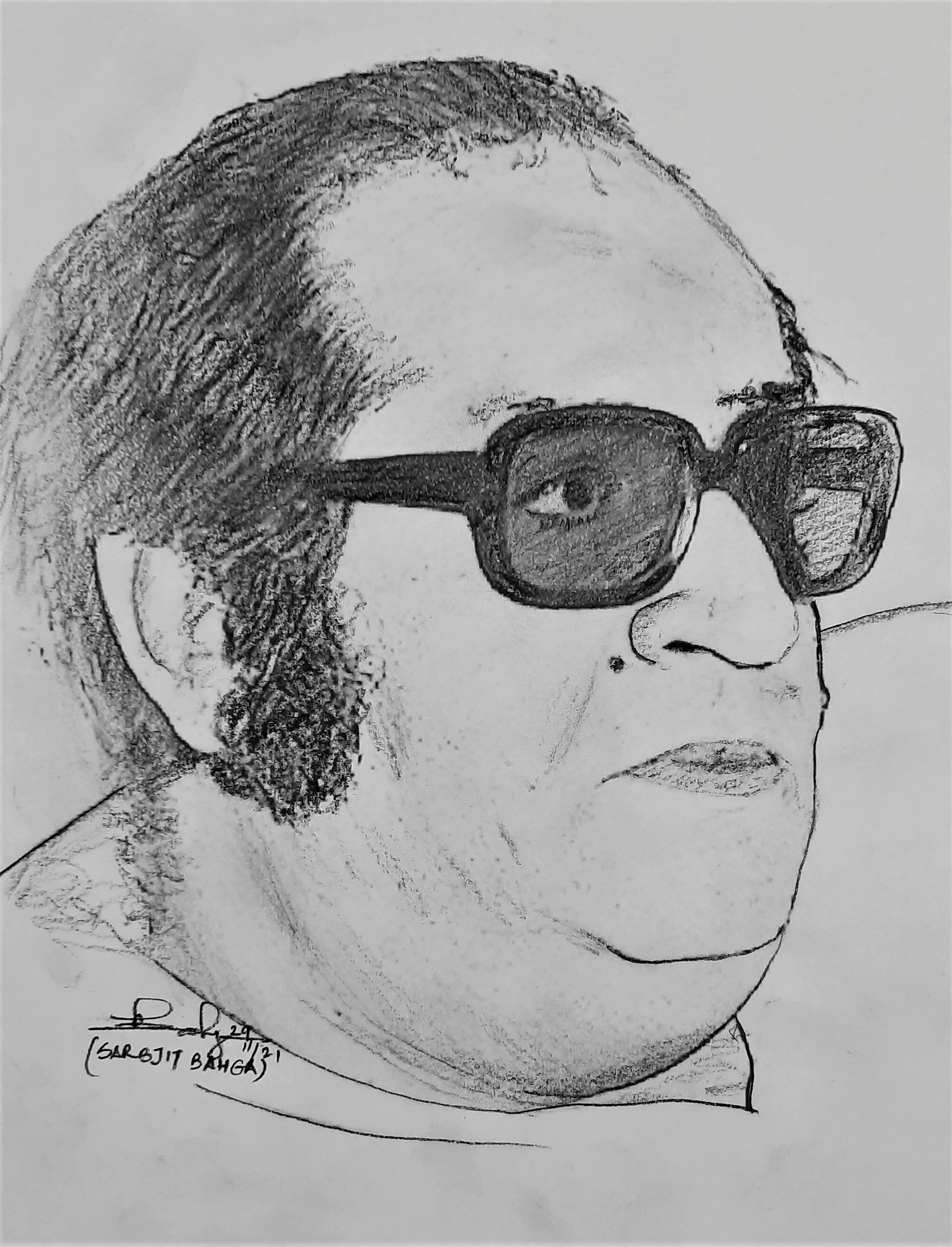
- Piloo Modi. A pencil sketch by Sarbjit Bahga.
- Born: 14 November 1926; Mumbai (erstwhile Bombay)
- Died: 29 January 1983 (aged 56)
- Citizenship: Indian
- Education: M.A (Architecture)
- Alma mater: the Doon School; Sir J. J. College of Architecture; University of California, Berkeley
- Occupation: Architect
- Spouse: Lavina Mody
- Father: Sir Homy Mody
- Relatives: Kaly Mody (Brother), Russi Mody(Brother)

Loksabha Member
- In office 1967–1975
- Constituency: Godhra

Rajyasabha Member
- In office 1978–1983
- Constituency: Gujarat

Personal details
- Party: Swatantra Party
- Other political affiliations: Bharatiya Lok Dal; Janata Party

Piloo Mody (14 November 1926 – 29 January 1983) was an Indian architect and politician and one of the founding members of the Swatantra Party. Elected to the 4th and 5th Lok Sabhas, he served in the Rajya Sabha from 1978 until his death.

== Personal life ==
A member of the Parsi community Piloo Mody was one of the sons of Sir Homi Mody. He was educated at The Doon School, Dehradun. After School he attended Sir J. J. College of Architecture and the University of California, Berkeley, from where he graduated with a master's degree in architecture. Zulfikar Ali Bhutto, who went on to become Prime Minister of Pakistan in the 1970s, was his college roommate and the two were close friends. He was married to an American, Lavina Colgan Mody, who was a fellow architect student at Berkeley on 3 January 1953. He had 2 brothers, Kali H. Mody, a pioneer of credit card operations in India and Russi Mody, a former chairman of the Tata Iron and Steel company Limited.

== Work as architect ==
After his stint at Berkeley he returned to India. He worked for two years spent on the Chandigarh Capital Project. He also designed the Chennai headquarters of Engineering Construction Corporation, a former subsidiary of Larsen & Toubro Ltd. It won the Federation Internationale de la Precontrainte prize for excellence in pre-stressed concrete from India. Piloo and Vina set up an architecture firm Mody and Colgan in 1953 at Stadium House, Churchgate.Their first project was a residential apartment at Marine Lines for senior officials of TISCO. They also designed the front casing of one model of Voltas Air conditioner. Piloo's other projects include residential project Olympus, three TELCO offices, the headquarters of Bharat Bijlee, Mukand Iron and Steel, Sandoz, Voltas and Diners Club and Business Service centres.

== Political life ==
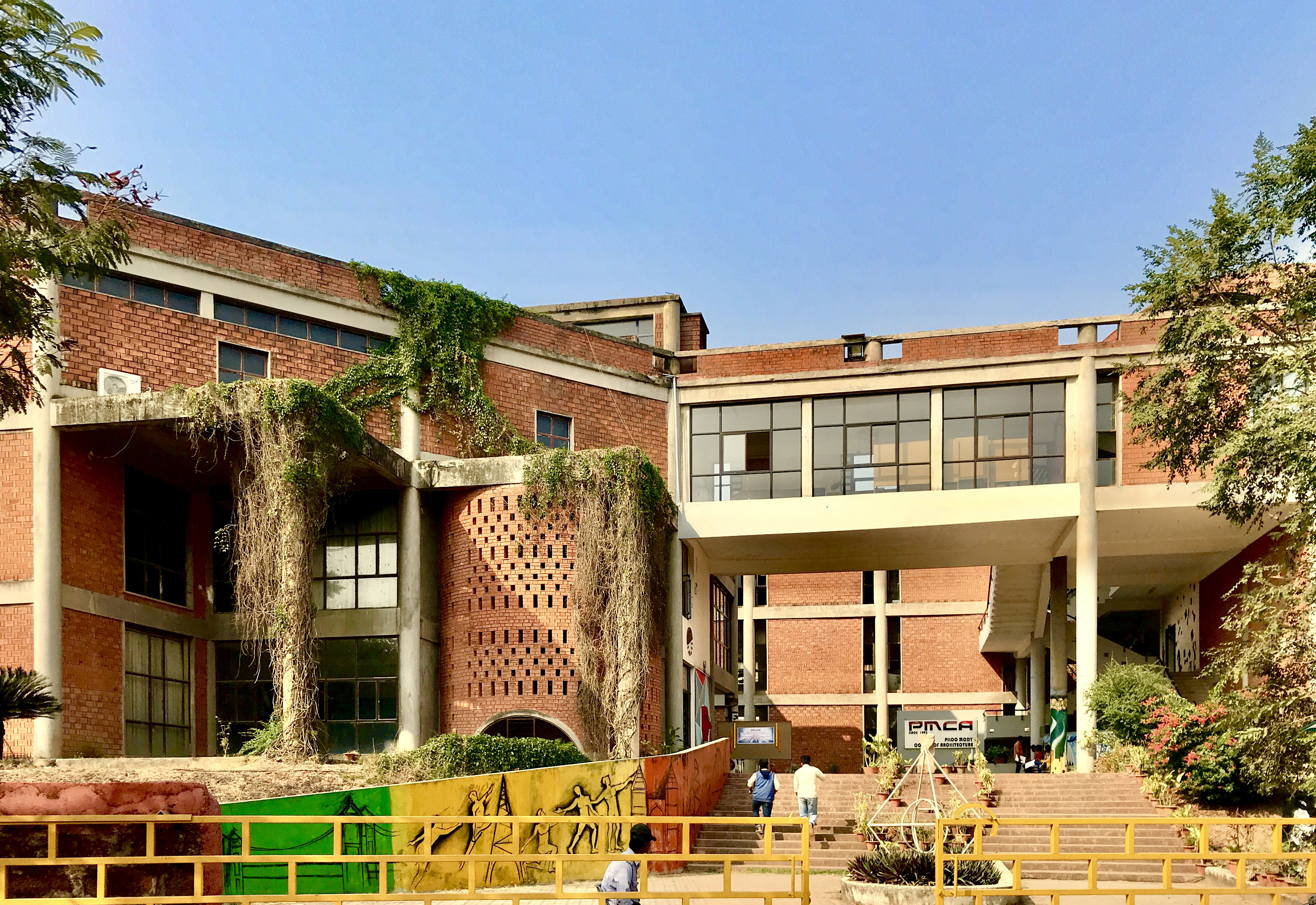
Piloo Mody College of Architecture in Cuttack

In political life Mody was an advocate of liberalism and freedom. He was associated with Swatantra Party at its founding. According to his wife Vina,

Piloo found designing pretty buildings unsatisfying with the country going to the dogs via the socialistic road.

So he became a founding member of Swatantra Party. At the 1967 general election he was elected to the 4th Lok Sabha, representing the Godhra constituency in Gujarat. In 1971 he was re-elected and served in the 5th Lok Sabha until March 1977. In 1972 he was instrumental in promoting the Architects' Act. In 1975, at the time of the Emergency in India, Mody was arrested on the orders of the Indira Gandhi government, using the controversial powers granted by the Maintenance of Internal Security Act.

After an absence of a year from parliament, on 10 April 1978 Mody joined the Rajya Sabha and served there until his death in 1983.

The Piloo Mody College of Architecture, at Cuttack, Orissa, and a FIDE chess tournament are named in his honour.

== Works ==
- Zulfi, My Friend (1973)
- Democracy Means Bread and Freedom (1979)
