= 1944 in India =

- Centuries: 18th; 19th; 20th; 21st
- Decades: 1920s; 1930s; 1940s; 1950s; 1960s
- See also: List of years in India; Timeline of Indian history

Events in the year 1944 in India.

== Incumbents ==
- Emperor of India – George VI
- Viceroy of India – The Viscount Wavell

== Events ==
- National income - ₹76,509 million
- 8 March – 3 July - Battle of Imphal against Operation U-Go.
- 20-26 March – Battle of Sangshak
- 4 April – 22 June - Battle of Kohima
- 14 April - INA hoisted the Indian tricolor for the first time on mainland India at Moirang in Manipur.
- 14 April – Bombay Explosion (1944)
- 25 April - Birth of Vinod Duggal S/O Shri Hussan Lal and Shrimati Sushila Duggal
- 5 May – Mohandas Gandhi released
- 7 November - Lakshmikanthan murder case and ensuing arrest of various prominent figures from Tamil cinema.

=== Dates unknown ===
- March to June – Operation U-Go; Japanese defeated in Manipur.
- April - National Conference under the leadership of Sheikh Abdullah submits a memorandum named Naya Kashmir before Hari Singh.

== Law ==
- Public Debt Act
- Cocoanut Committee Act
- Central Excises and Salt Act

== Births ==
- 11 January
  - Shibu Soren, politician and Chief Minister of Jharkhand.
  - Jagdish Tytler, politician.
- 18 February - Gurmeet Bawa, folk singer (died 2021)
- 23 February - J. C. Diwakar Reddy, politician and member of parliament from Anantapur.
- 9 April – Ronen Sen, diplomat and ambassador to the United States of America.
- 1 May – Suresh Kalmadi, politician and businessman.
- 10 May – Antonette Mendes, singer and actress (died 2024)
- 1 June - Mekapati Rajamohan Reddy, politician and former member of parliament from Nellore.
- 20 August – Rajiv Gandhi, politician, 6th Prime Minister of India (died 1991)
- 23 August – Saira Banu, actress.
- 1 September – C. M. Gupta, scientist.
- 3 November – Debasis Mitra, mathematician.
- 8 December – Sharmila Tagore, actress.

== Deaths ==
- 22 February – Kasturba Gandhi, wife of Mohandas Karamchand Gandhi (born 1869).
- 9 November – C. N. Lakshmikanthan, Tamil film journalist
