= Gerald Almeida =

Religious figure (born 1946)

- Rev.Bishop of Jabalpur
- Born: March 7, 1946 (age 79); Udyavar, Mangalore

Bishop Gerald Almeida (born March 7, 1946) is the emeritus Roman Catholic Bishop of Jabalpur, Madhya Pradesh.

== Early life ==
Bishop Gerald Almeida was born on March 7, 1946, at Udyavar a small town near Mangalore. He was ordained a priest in 1974.
