= Avinash Balkrishna Patwardhan =

Indian civil engineer

Avinash Balkrishna Patwardhan (born 30 August 1953) is a civil engineer and a researcher on Indian classical music from Maharashtra. He is one of the few to unveil and demonstrate the Sarana Chatushtai as originally suggested by Bharata Muni in the Bharata Natya Shastra, the only way to obtain 22 srutis, or notes useful to music, on a musical instrument.

== Early life and education ==
He is born in Nagpur, Maharashtra. He did his graduation at Government College of Engineering, Amravati (GCoEA) in 1975 and later completed his graduation in law.

== Career ==
He started his career as an engineer with the state government of Maharashtra. Later he went into teaching civil engineering and eventually joined social work. He was a part of the Knit India movement (1985–1988) and Narmada Bachao Andolan (1998-1993) with late Baba Amte. He also worked with Dr. Vikas Amte for Earthquake Relief at Killari, Maharashtra (1993–1994). He started his research on Indian classical music in the 1990s which led to his work on the Sarana Chatushtai and later he also evolved a methodology to develop perfectly tuned flutes.

== Research on Indian Classical Music ==
Patwardhan did the Bharata Natya Shastra Sarana Chatushtai and developed a methodology that could produce perfectly tuned flutes for the ten ‘thatas’ that are in the Indian Classical Music. His research on Indian classical music led him to successfully demonstrate the Sarana Chatushtai in the year 1998. His experiment was critically reviewed by peers.

His work has been acknowledged by music experts and he has also presented a paper on the same at ITC Sangeet Research Academy, Calcutta, India at the National Symposium on Acoustics (1998). This demonstration proves incorrect, the assumption by Pandit Vishnu Narayan Bhatkhande, who has criticized the concept of existence of srutis itself in his book Bhartiya Sangita Paddhati [Vol 2] (written in the late 18th or early 19th century).

Avinash Balkrishna Patwardhan later also evolved a methodology to develop perfectly tuned flutes for ten thatas in the present Indian classical music using both bamboo and PVC material.

In Nov 2014, his book "Shruti Darpan" was published which is suitable reading for music scholars as well as research students in Indian classical music.

== Others ==
Avinash Balkrishna Patwardhan is the author of the first Indian book on the solution for Rubik's Cube which was published in 1981. He is also the nephew of late renowned Indian social worker Baba Amte.

== Publications ==
1. Publication : Paper authored by Avinash Balkrishna Patwardhan unveiling the fundamental principles governing Indian classical music by research on Bharata Muni's Natya Shastra at the National Symposium on Acoustics (1998), ITC Sangeet Research Academy, Calcutta, India.
