= Liaquat–Nehru Pact =

1950 India–Pakistan treaty on minorities

Liyaquat–Nehru Pact
Agreement Between The Government of India and Pakistan Regarding Security and Rights of Minorities
- Type: Mutual understanding of protecting rights
- Context: Partition of India
- Drafted: 2 April 1950
- Signed: 8 April 1950; 76 years ago
- Location: New Delhi, India
- Condition: Ratifications of Both Parties
- Expiration: 8 April 1956
- Mediators: Human rights ministries of India and Pakistan
- Negotiators: Foreign ministries of India and Pakistan
- Signatories: Jawaharlal Nehru _{(Prime Minister of India)}; Liaquat Ali Khan _{(Prime Minister of Pakistan)}
- Parties: India; Pakistan
- Ratifiers: Parliament of India; Parliament of Pakistan
- Depositaries: Governments of India and Pakistan
- Languages: Hindi; Urdu; English

The Liaquat–Nehru Pact (or the Delhi Pact on minorities) was a bilateral treaty between India and Pakistan in which refugees were allowed to return to dispose of their property, abducted women and looted property were to be returned, forced conversions were unrecognized, and minority rights were confirmed.

The treaty was signed in New Delhi by the Prime Minister of India Jawaharlal Nehru and the Prime Minister of Pakistan Liaquat Ali Khan on April 8, 1950. The treaty was the outcome of six days of talks sought to guarantee the rights of minorities in both countries after the Partition of India and to avert another war between them.

This pact also introduced a visa system for refugees and free passage of refugees across the border was restricted.

Minority commissions were set up in both countries. More than one million refugees migrated from East Pakistan (now Bangladesh) to West Bengal in India.

== See also ==
- List of treaties
