= Harish Naval =

Indian professor and editor (born 1947)

Dr. Harish Naval (born 8 January 1947) is working with the Indian Council for Cultural Relations, under the Ministry of External Affairs (Government of India) as chief editor of the international literary journal Gaganachal.

He retired as professor of Hindi literature at Hindu College and he was the head of the department of Hindi. Naval has authored several Hindi books, articles and screenplays for television.

== Work ==
He worked as a professor of Hindi literature at Hindu College, University of Delhi, and he was the head of Hindi department.

He has authored 26 books all of them in Hindi.

- Has been the literary adviser (Hindi) to the India Today magazine.
- Has also served as a consultant for Hindi Programming on the NDTV news channel.
- Visiting speaker at Sofia University, Bulgaria.
- Visiting speaker at Tokyo University and Osaka University, Japan.
- Held the position of head examiner and professor at Mauritius University.
- He is editor of Hindi magazine Gaganachal ( गगनांचल)This magazine is for NRI's and reaches the Indian consulate in various countries.

Naval has been awarded more than 12 National Level Literary Prizes including Yuva Jnanpeeth Prize, Govt of India's ‘Gobind Ballabh Pant Prize’, Sahity Kala Parishad Puruskar, Vyangy Shri Samman and ‘Urvashi Puruskar. He has been felicitated in Washington by Antar Rashtriya Hindi Samiti Chapter, by ‘Arya Samaj New York USA and Hindi Speaking Union Mauritius. Naval has represented India as a Hindi author in international literary seminars and cultural trips to 46 countries.

== Awards ==
Recipient of the Yuva Jnanpith Puruskar (prize) for his first book Bagpat Ke Kharbuje. He has also received other awards such as "Madhyam Puruskar", "Sahiya Mani", "Jainendra Kumar Samman", "Fiqra Tauswin Award", "Balkan ji Bari International Award" and so forth.
