= Pandu railway station =

Railway station in Assam

Pandu

General information
- Location: Kamakhya, Kamrup district, Assam; India
- Coordinates: 26.1713°N 91.6861°E
- Elevation: 54 metres (177 ft)
- Owner: Indian Railways
- Platforms: 2
- Tracks: 4
- Connections: Auto stand

Construction
- Structure type: Standard (on-ground station)
- Parking: No
- Cycle facilities: No

Other information
- Status: Active
- Station code: PNO
- Zone(s): Northeast Frontier Railway zone
- Division(s): Lumding
Location
- Location within Guwahati Location within Assam

Pandu Railway Station is a small railway station in Guwahati, Assam. Its code is PNO.

== Location ==
It is located near Guwahati City.
