= Ibrahim Saeed =

Ibrahim Saeed, sometimes spelled as Sayeed (20 May 1945 – 27 May 2007), was an Indian writer and publisher.

After returning from his second Hajj pilgrimage to Mecca, he relinquished the presidency of Jamat-e-Islami, which he had held from 2003 to 2006. For a decade he served as a member of the national representative body of Jamat-e-Islami Hind in Delhi. Saeed was one of founders of Shanthi Prakashana and later he became chairman of this publishing house.

== Scholar and orator ==
Saeed is known to the people of Karnataka state not merely as a journalist but also as a thinker, an intellectual and a scholar. He was an orator who traveled widely in Karnataka giving lectures on various topics including communal harmony, character building and moral values, as well as the significance of democracy in India. Da’wah is another field he had taken up to his heart during his lifetime and had composed several Da’wah related books. Plenty of his Kannada and Urdu speeches have come out in form of audio cassettes as well. He did voice recording for the first ever Kannada translation of the Qur’an in electronic format. The multilingual Saeed is fluent in Kannada, Urdu and English. He has studied Arabic and Malayalam languages privately. He used to hold his weekly Qur'an discourse sessions in Kannada and also in Beary bashe, a dialect used by the Indian Beary community live alongside coastal Karnataka.

== Contribution to communal harmony ==
Saeed firmly believed that most of the mistrust between the followers of Islam and of other religions springs from the lack of knowledge about each other's faith. He was a student of comparative religions and tried to remove mistrust and bring people of various religions closer through his translations, writings and speeches.

== Literary life ==
One work, Tappu kalpanegalu, was reprinted nine times. It earned him prominence in the neighboring states of Karnataka when it was translated into English, Marathi and Tamil. He had also rendered services as chairman of Shanti Prakashana, a publishing company based in Mangalore city.

His work Mahakavi Iqbalara kavanagalu is an attempt to transform thoughts and philosophy of Allama Iqbal into Kannada language which he had started to pen down in his popular weekly, Sanmarga. Shanti Prakashana, of which he was chairman, later brought it out in book form. This is the first major work in Kannada as regard to Sir Allama Iqbal's poetry or philosophy is concerned.

Ibrahim Saeed also served on the translation board of Divya Qur’an and Qur’an Vyakhyana. The former is a translation and the latter is commentary (Tafsir) work of the Qur’an in Kannada. Qur’an Vyakhyana is an abridged version of Towards Understanding the Qur'an, the renowned Qur’an exegesis. He has enormously contributed to bring out Kannada Translation of Qur'an in audio cassettes and later in CD form.

Pravadi Jeevana Sandesha is a biography of Muhammad with proper citations and reference sources.

Ibrahim Saeed was a columnist in Prajavani, the largest published Kannada daily of Karnataka. In Prajavani he wrote under nom de plume Sanmargi..

== Death ==
Ibrahim Saeed died at the age of 62 on 27 May 2007 at Unity Health Complex, a private healthcare centre in Mangalore. He had been admitted to the hospital only the previous night. He left behind four sons and four daughters.

== Funeral ==
Saeed's funeral was attended by a large number of people in the city of Mangalore. Chief minister of Karnataka state H. D. Kumaraswamy, former chief minister Dharam Singh have visited Saeed's house in Kankanady. State opposition leader Mallikarjun Kharge, former central minister C. K. Jaffer Sharief, former ministers B.A. Moidin, Tanveer Saith, Zamir Ahmed Khan, Roshan Beig and many other eminent personalities from different walks of life have also paid their tribute.

Saeed was buried in the central grave yard of Zeenat Bakhsh Juma Masjid after Asr prayer on 28 May 2007 in Bunder area of Mangalore city. His elder son Ameen Ahsan, a unit president of JIH at Uppinangady and a businessman, led Salat al-Janazah at Zeenat Baksh Juma Masjid.

In absentia funeral prayers have held in Qatar, Riyadh and other places in Middle Eastern countries.

== Condolence meeting ==
Dakshina Kannada district's Kannada Sahitya Parishad, Dharma Samanvaya Mangalooru and Jamat-e-Islami had jointly held a condolence meet in Town hall of Mangalore. Dignitaries like John Fernandes, Mugavalli Keshava Dharani, Tufail Mohammed, Shahanaz M., B.A Moidin, Pattabhirama Somayaji Pradeep Kumar Kalkura, Umer U.H., Mohammed Kunhi, Hamid Hussain, Mohammed Haneef Goltamajalu, Dr. Mohammed Ismail, and other eminents have made condolatory remarks in the gathering.
