= Manju Bansal =

Indian biophysicist

- Born: 1 December 1950 (age 75); Dehradun, India
- Education: Osmania University, Hyderabad
- Known for: Molecular Biophysics, Structural and Computational Biology
- Scientific career
- Workplaces: Institute of Bioinformatics and Applied Biotechnology; IISc, Bangalore

Manju Bansal (born. 1 December 1950) has specialized in the field of Molecular biophysics. Currently, she is a professor in theoretical Biophysics group for Molecular Biophysics unit in the Indian Institute of Science, Bangalore. She is the founder director of the Institute of Bioinformatics and Applied Biotechnology at Bangalore.

== Education ==
Bansal did her schooling from Hyderabad and Dehradun. She developed a great interest in Science and later went ahead to earn her BSc and MSc from Osmania University, Hyderabad. In 1972 she joined the Molecular Biophysics Unit, Indian Institute of Science, Bangalore for her doctoral degree. She got an opportunity to work under the guidance of biophysicist G. N. Ramachandran, on the theoretical modeling of the triple helical structure of the fibrous protein collagen. She received her PhD in 1977. Thereafter, she continued working at IISc as a post-doctoral fellow on left handed and other unusual structures of DNA till 1981. She then went to Germany as an Alexander von Humboldt Fellow at the European Molecular Biology Laboratory, Heidelberg, for a year and worked on the structure of filamentous phages.

== Fellowships ==
Bansal has been awarded an EMBL Visiting Fellowship and AvH Fellowship, Germany and Senior Fulbright Fellowship, USA. She has been a visiting professor at Rutgers University, US, and visiting consultant at NIH, Bethesda, USA.

== Awards and honours ==
Bansal was awarded the INSA Medal for Young Scientists in 1979. She is a Fellow of the Indian Academy of Sciences, Bangalore and National Academy of Sciences (India), Prayagraj, since 1998.
