= Sursand Raj =

Zamindari estate in Mithila region

- Capital: Sursand
- Official languages: Maithili
- Other languages: Maithili, Hindi, Sanskrit
- Religion: Hinduism
- Demonym: Maithil
- Government: Monarchy
  - Raja: Chieftain
- Establishment: King Sursen
- During Mughal Empire
- Today part of: Bihar

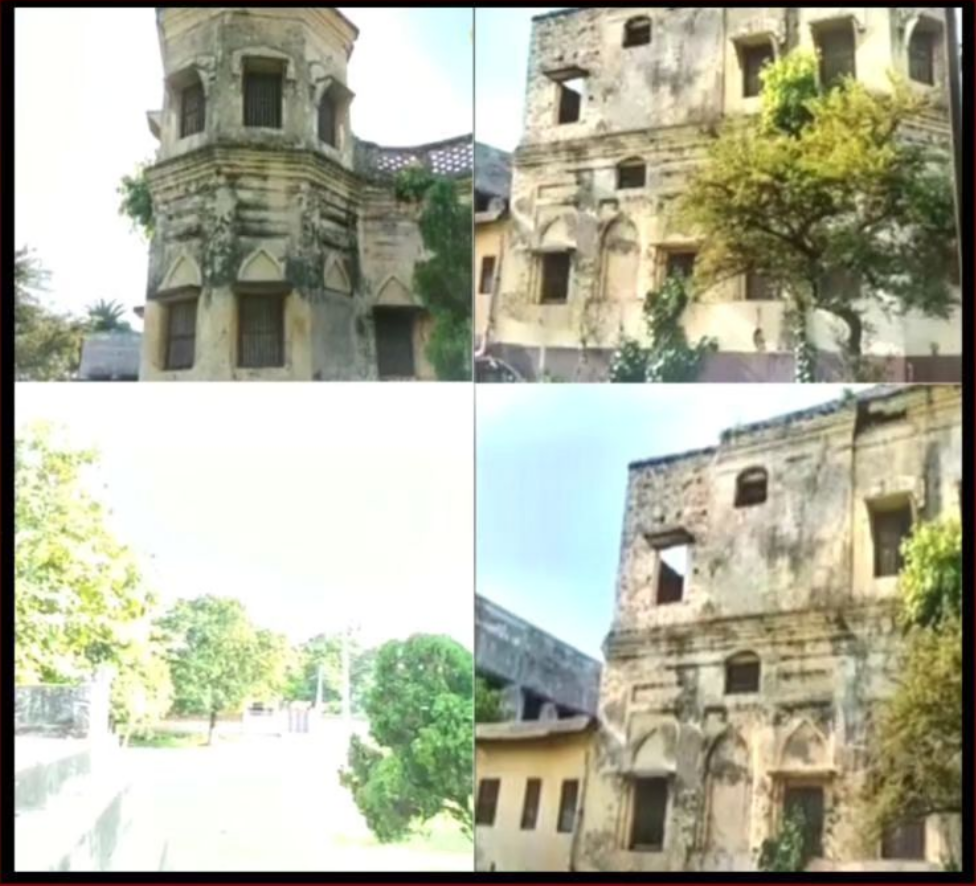
View of the palace fort of Sursand Raj known as Sursandgarh in the town of Sursand

Sursand Raj was a zamindari estate in the region of Mithila in the Indian subcontinent. The capital of the estate was in the present town of Sursand in India. The history of the zamindari estate in Sursand can be traced since the period of the Mughals Empire in the subcontinent. The rulers of the estate were Bhumihars. There were a total of 383 maujas under the control of the Sursand Raj. A mauja refers to a group of several villages. It was extended up to the areas of the present Chapra district in Bihar. The rule of the Sursand Raj in the region ended after the independence of India and merged into the Union of India. After that the region under the control of Sursand Raj became the part of the Bihar state in India. The fort of the Sursand Raj is known as Sursandgarh. It was the headquarter of the zamindari estate of Sursand.

== Etymology ==
The term Sursand is derived from its founder King Sursen. The Indic term Raj signifies to the rules and legislation implemented by the rulers of the territory under his control. Thus, the literal meaning of Sursand Raj is a rulling territory established by the founder King Sursen.

== History ==
The history (16th-18th century) of the zamindari estate of the Sursand Raj starts from its founder King Sursen. He established a rulling territory under his control during the period of the Mughals empire in the subcontinent. He built a fort for his palace known as Sursandgarh in the Mithila region at the present town of Sursand in India. The ruins of the fort still exists in the town. According to the historical document, Bengal District Gazetteers (1907), the estate lapsed once more into jungle after the death of the King Sursen. In the later period, it was reclaimed by two brothers Mahesh Jha and Amar Jha living in the village of Yadupatti. They were the founders of the present Sursand family. It is said that once Mahesh Jha came to the jungle of Sursand for hunting along with his astrologer. There they saw the ruins of the Sursand Raj's fort. The astrologer advised Mahesh Jha that a person who would make it as his home, would be a Raja (king). After that Mahesh Jha cleared the judge and lived there by the advice of his astrologer and became the king of the zamindari estate.

In the later period after some generations, during 19th-20th centuries, there was a queen, she was sonless. She had a daughter. After the marriage of her daughter, she gifted the estate to her son-in-law Devakinandan Pratap Shahi. He was originally from Hathua in Bihar. He was adorned as the Raja (king) of the zamindari estate. He had two sons. They were Visheshwar Pratap Shahi and Rameshwar Pratap Shahi. After the rule of the King Devakinandan Pratap Shahi, it was jointly ruled by his two sons. After the death of the King Visheshwar Pratap Shahi, it was ruled jointly by the kings Laxmeshwar Pratap Shahi and Rameshwar Pratap Shahi. The last king of the Sursand Raj was Laxmeshwar Pratap Shahi. He was also called as Raja Ji. In the year 1950, the rule of the Sursand Raj ended and was merged in the Union of India.

In the 20th century, Chandreshwar Prasad Narayan Singh also known as Sir C P N Sinha was one of the notable scions from the royal family of the Sursand Raj. Later, he was appointed as the ambassador to Nepal by the Government of India in the year 1949. He served as the ambassador to Nepal till 1952.

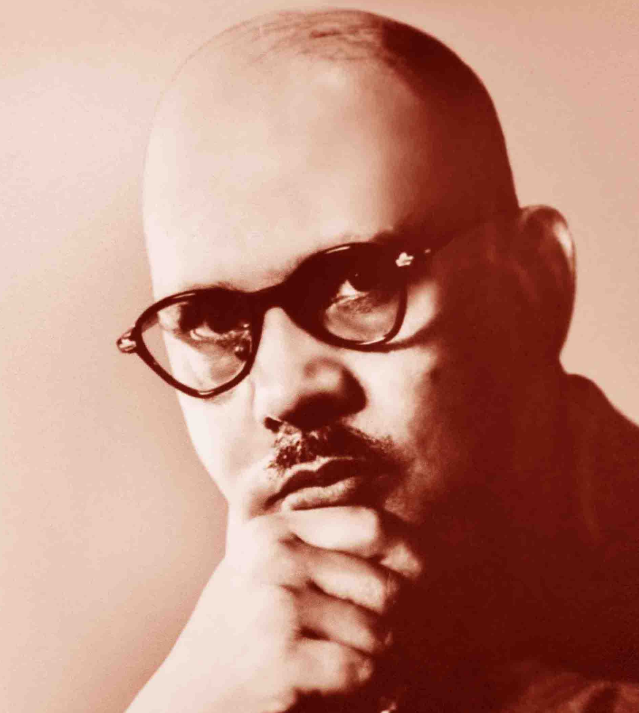
Chandeshwar Prasad Narayan Singh

His brother name was Babu Maheshwar Prasad Narayan Singh.
