= 1943 Madras floods =

1943 floods in India

The 1943 Chennai floods occurred during the annual northeast monsoon in Madras (now Chennai) in India.

== Causes ==
Lying on the Bay of Bengal coast, Chennai is prone to violent storms and thundershowers during the northeast monsoon (September–November). In October 1943, there were continuous rains lasting over six days.

== Events ==
The Coovum and the Adyar rivers overflowed inundating the surrounding residential areas. The brunt of the damage was borne by the slums that lay on the banks of the Coovum. Slums in Lock Cheri, Choolaimedu, Perambur, Kosapet, Kondithope and Chintadripet were washed out and people sought refuge in the Ripon Building. There were casualties in Medavakkam, Perambur and Purasawalkam. The police used boats and catamarans to row people to safety.

== See also ==
- History of Chennai
- Water management in Chennai
