= Milind Rege =

Indian cricketer (1949–2025)

Personal information
- Full name: Milind Dattatreya Rege
- Born: 16 February 1949; Bombay, India
- Died: 19 February 2025 (aged 76); Mumbai, Maharashtra, India
- Batting: Right-handed
- Bowling: Right-arm off break

Domestic team information
- Years: Team
- 1967–1978: Bombay

Career statistics
Competition	FC
Matches	52
Runs scored	1,531
Batting average	23.92
100s/50s	0/8
Top score	67*
Balls bowled	9,240
Wickets	125
Bowling average	29.46
5 wickets in innings	3
10 wickets in match	0
Best bowling	6/84
Catches/stumpings	48/–
- Source: ESPNcricinfo, 20 December 2015

Milind Rege (16 February 1949 – 19 February 2025) was an Indian first-class cricketer who played for Bombay from 1967–68 to 1977–78. He was the chairman of selectors with the Mumbai Cricket Association.

== Early life ==
Rege was born in Bombay, Bombay Province, India, on 16 February 1949. He graduated from St. Xavier's College.

== Career ==
Rege played as a bowling all-rounder who batted right-handed and bowled right-arm off break. He represented Bombay in domestic cricket and appeared in 52 first-class matches between 1967–68 and 1977–78, and was part of five consecutive Ranji Trophy winning seasons with Bombay. He also captained Bombay in a few matches and played for West Zone. Rege had suffered a heart attack at the age of 26 and returned to play after a break of one year.

Rege continued to be associated with Mumbai cricket after retirement, working for various subcommittees of the Mumbai Cricket Association (MCA). Having worked as a Mumbai selector since the 1980s, he was appointed chairman of selectors in 2011. He resigned from the post in 2012 but continued to be a member of the four-man panel. He was reinstated at the position of chairman in 2015. In 2019, he was re-appointed the chief selector of Mumbai and Mumbai under-23 teams. In 2020, he became an advisor to the MCA.

He was the secretary of the Tata Sports Club for more than two decades and the president of Association of Cricket Umpires of Mumbai and Member Secretary of the Cricket Improvement Committee. He was also the West Zone representative of the Media Committee for the Board of Control for Cricket in India.

Rege worked for Tata Steel as the head of corporate communications for more than a decade at its Mumbai head office. He had previously been the senior divisional manager at the company.

== Death ==
Rege was admitted to a hospital following a heart attack. He died in Mumbai on 19 February 2025, three days after his 76th birthday. His body was cremated at the Shivaji Park, with several notable former Mumbai cricketers in attendance.
