= Bharalumukh =

- Interactive map of Bharalumukh
- Coordinates: 26°10′25″N 91°43′56″E
- Country: India
- State: Assam
- Region: Western Assam
- District: Kamrup Metropolitan

Area
  - Total: 2.53 km^{2} (0.98 sq mi)

Dimensions
  - Length: 2.19 km (1.36 mi)
  - Width: 1.90 km (1.18 mi)
- Time zone: UTC+5:30 (IST)
- Area code: 781028
- Vehicle registration: AS - 01
- Website: gmc.assam.gov.in

Bharalumukh is a locality near the south bank of the Brahmaputra River in Guwahati, surrounded by Santipur and Pan Bazaar localities. It is 3 kilometres (1.9 mi) and 19 kilometres (12 mi) from Guwahati railway station and LGBI Airport, respectively.

== See also ==
- Paltan Bazaar
- Beltola
