= Lalitha Lenin =

Indian poet and academic

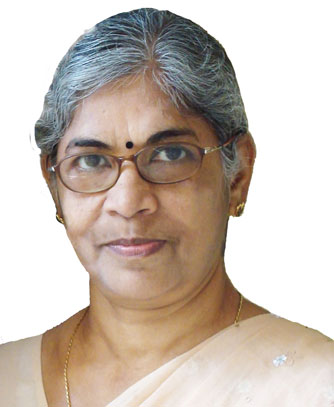

K. K. Lalitha Bai is a Malayalam-language Indian poet. She was also the Head of the Department of Library and Information Science, University of Kerala, Thiruvananthapuram.

== Personal life ==
Lalitha Lenin was born in 1946 at Thrithalloor, Thrissur, Kerala.

== Background ==
She graduated from the University of Kerala with degrees in Chemistry, Education and Library Science. From 1990 to 1995 she served as the Head of the Department, Department of Library and Information Science, University of Kerala.

She retired as associate professor from the department on 31 March 2006.

== Awards ==
Lalitha Lenin's book, Minnu, was awarded the Kerala Sahitya Academy Award for children's literature in 1986. She is also a recipient of the Abudhabi Shakti Award for poetry in 1996 and the Moolur Award for poetry in 2001.
