= Vellakal Palaniapa Subramania Mudaliar =

Indian translator

Rao Shaib Vellakal Palaniappa Subramania Mudaliar
- Born: 14 August 1857; Alwarkurichi, Tinnevely District, Madras Presidency, British India (now in Tenkasi district, Tamil Nadu, India)
- Died: 12 October 1946 (aged 89)
- Occupations: Retired Veterinary College Dean, landlord, Tamil Scholar

Vellakal Palaniapa Subramania Mudaliar (14 August 1857 – 12 October 1946) was a translator who translated books on veterinary diseases from English to Tamil. He studied Tamil and English at Tirunelveli mission school in Tamil Nadu and at Christian college and veterinary from Govt. veterinary college, graduating in 1884 GMAC.

He was given the title of Rao Shaib by King George V in 1926 for the best performer.

He wrote a number of Tamil books including Kombi virutham, Akaligai venba, and a book on Tamil literature. He also pioneered the translation of veterinary texts from English into Tamil.
