= Chandeshwar Prasad Narayan Singh =

Indian freedom fighter, diplomat and administrator

Sir Chandeshwar Prasad Narayan Singh CIE
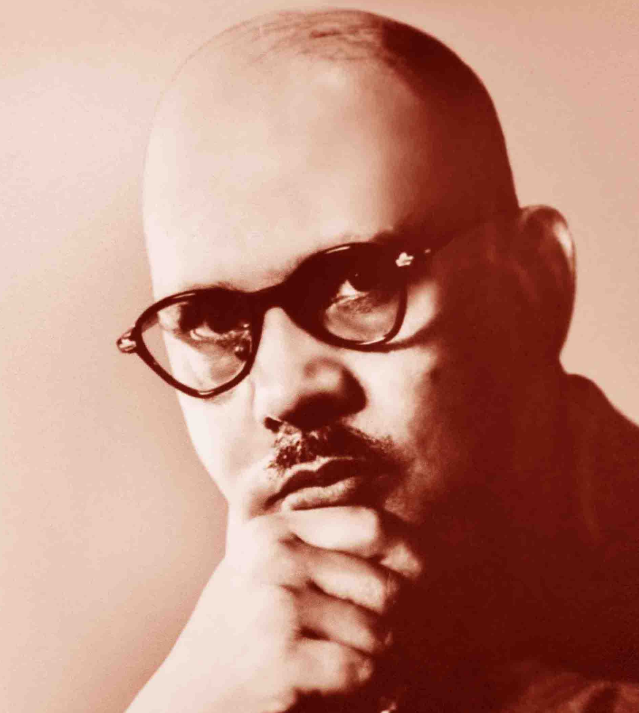

18th Governor of Uttar Pradesh
- In office 28 February 1980 – 31 March 1985
- Chief Minister: Vishwanath Pratap Singh; Sripati Mishra; N. D. Tiwari
- Preceded by: Ganpatrao Devji Tapase
- Succeeded by: Mohammed Usman Arif

2nd Governor of Punjab
- In office 11 March 1953 – 15 September 1958
- Chief Minister: Bhim Sen Sachar; Partap Singh Kairon
- Preceded by: Chandulal Madhavlal Trivedi
- Succeeded by: Narhar Vishnu Gadgil

Personal details
- Born: 18 April 1901 Parasagarh, Saran District, Bengal Presidency, British India (Now in Bihar, India)
- Died: 29 November 1994 (aged 93) New Delhi, India
- Education: Calcutta University
- Awards: Commander of the Order of the Indian Empire (CIE) (1935) Padma Vibhushan (1977)
- A scions from the royal family of the Sursand Raj in Mithila.

Sir Chandeshwar Prasad Narayan Singh (18 April 1901 – 29 November 1994) was an Indian freedom fighter, landlord, diplomat and administrator. He was also a scions from the royal family of Sursand Raj in the Mithila region of Bihar in India. He was also called as Babu Chandeshwar Prasad Narayan Singh.

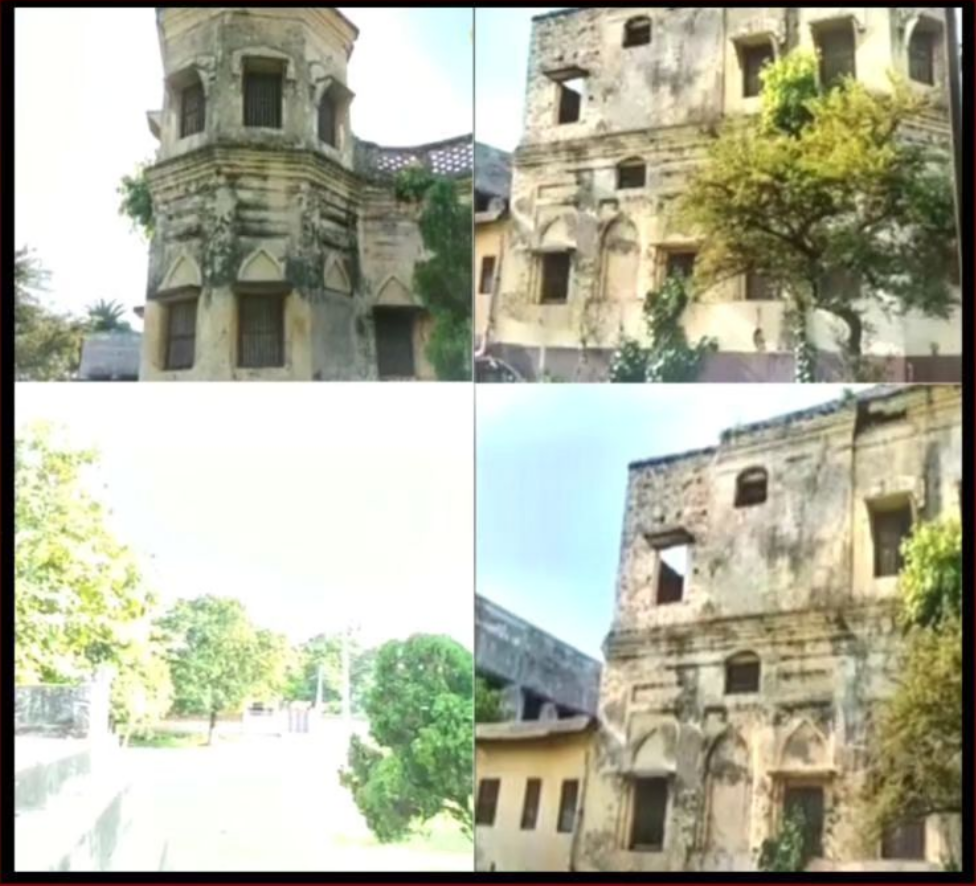
Ruins of the ancestral Sursand Raj fort in the town of Sursand in the Sitamarhi district of Bihar in India.

== Early life ==
Singh was born in Parsagarh in Saran district of Bihar. He obtained an M.A. from Calcutta University, from where he also obtained the Mallick Gold Medal in 1925. He was a Sanskrit scholar. After returning to Bihar, he joined the national movement, getting elected to the then Bihar Legislative Council in 1927. He was also elected Chairman of the District Board of Muzaffarpur, where he organised relief efforts for earthquake victims of the 1934 Nepal–Bihar earthquake.

== Career ==
He was conferred a Companion of the Order of the Indian Empire (CIE) in New Year Honours List of 1935. In 1945, he was appointed as the Vice-Chancellor of the new Patna University. His contribution to development of a post-graduate course in the university was acclaimed by all. He brought teachers of eminence from all over the country to administer the newly opened departments. Further, his support for the education of girls was highlighted and the tradition continues to this day with three of the thirteen colleges of Patna University being exclusively for girls, and another eight being co-educational with a high percentage of girls. The Patna University Institute of Psychological Research and Service, one of the oldest psychological service centres in Eastern India was founded in 1945 by him. The institute is located at Krishna Kunj. The building housing the institute was donated to the university by the late Sir Ganesh Dutt Singh, an eminent educationist of the state. In 1946 he was conferred his knighthood.

After independence, in 1949, he was invited by the then Prime Minister of India, Jawaharlal Nehru, to become India's ambassador to Nepal. It was during this tenure that the King of Nepal sought refuge at the Indian embassy in 1950. After completing his tenure in Kathmandu, he was appointed as the Governor of undivided Punjab in 1953. Under his aegis that the city of Chandigarh as well as the Bhakra Dam were built. The establishment of the Kurukshetra University was his dream. He wanted to set up an institute to promote Indian culture and traditions. He was also appointed as the governor of Uttar Pradesh. He was a close friend of Jawaharlal Nehru. Also, Pracheen Kala Kendra, an institution for arts and culture was established in Chandigarh in 1956 with his active support and kind patronage. In 1958, he went as India's ambassador to Japan. There he was given an honorary doctorate from Ohtani University. Unable to continue in that post, due to ill-health, he was forced to come back to India.

== Zamindari ==
Singh opposed the abolition of zamindari, along with Kameshwar Singh of Raj Darbhanga.

Singh was the leader of the pro-establishment landed aristocracy. His speeches from the opposition bench against Restoration of the Bakasht Land Act and the Bihr Tenancy Act by the Congress Ministry during 1937-39 and Sri Krishna Sinha's forceful defence, though they added a memorable chapter in the province's legislative history, marked the division of the aristocracy into pro and anti-Congress factions.

== Retirement ==
After retirement he became a director of the Reserve Bank of India and the IDBI Bank, and chairman of several companies. In 1977 he was honoured with a Padma Vibhushan for meritorious services rendered to the country.

Singh's focus on the empowerment of women, both in his family and outside, was well known. He supported his daughter, Pratibha Singh, to become a multiple term member of the Rajya Sabha. He was responsible for his granddaughter, Ratna Singh (now Ratna Vira), who topped the CBSE board examination, joining the prestigious St. Stephen's College in Delhi, against opposition from other members of the family. Ratna Vira is a best-selling author and artist, and her first book, Daughter By Court Order, has received a lot of acclaim.
