= Uzan Bazaar =

Bazaar in Guwahati, Assam, India

Coordinates: 26°21′N 91°7′E

Uzan Bazar is a residential and commercial centre of Guwahati and one of the oldest settlements in the city. It is located in the northern part of the city with the river Brahmaputra flowing alongside in north.

== Rajbari ==
Rajbari is one of the historical places within Guwahati. It was the bed of the Ahom Kingdom in Lower Assam. It is situated in the banks of river Brahmaputra and located in the current road leading to Raj Bhawan (Governor's House). The original Kareng was destroyed in the great Assam earthquake of 1897. However, later the British East India Company constructed a new residence to house the royal family. The remnants of Kareng (Palace) of the Ahom Kingdom is situated within the compound of Rajbari. This structure is still preserved at Rajbari with descendants of the royal family residing in it. The royal temple is located within the compound which now serves as Naamghar for the extended families residing within Rajbari and in other parts of the city. The descendant families of the Ahom Kings still live in that area of the city. Currently, there are more than 15 families belonging to the erstwhile Ahom Kingdom residing within the Rajbari compound. Many of the families have shifted out to Zoo Road Tiniali - Gitanagar area of the city.
