= Santipur, Guwahati =

Locality in Guwahati, Assam, India

Coordinates: 26°16′N 91°7′E

Santipur is a locality in Guwahati, Assam, India, near the south bank of the river Brahmaputra. It is near Bharalumukh.

Zip code is 781009.

There are temples, Namghar and a mosque located in the area. Santipur is well known for the Pragjyotish College.

== Education ==
Sonaram High School, Pragjyotish College, Sun Flower English School, Santipur L.P. School are located here.

== Famous personality ==
Arnab Goswami is an Indian journalist, the editor-in-chief and a news anchor of the Indian news channel Times Now and ET Now, hails from this locality.

== See also ==
- Pan Bazaar
- Paltan Bazaar
- Beltola
