= Homi Mody =

Indian businessman

Sir Hormasji Pherozeshah Mody KBE (23 September 1881 – 9 March 1969), generally known as Sir Homi Mody was a noted Parsi businessman associated with the Tata Group and an administrator of India.

== Business career ==
He started his career as a lawyer at Mumbai and in 1913 became chairman of the Bombay Municipal Corporation. In 1920 he joined business and became member of Textile Mill owners' Association of which he became chairman in 1927. His signing of Lees-Mody pact as its chairman was subject of debate in Indian nationalist circle. He joined the Tata Group as director in 1939 and served the group till 1959. He also served as director in various companies like – ACC, Tata Hydro, Indian Hotels.

He was director of the Central Bank of India till 1968. He with other leaders like Pranlal Devkaran Nanjee played crucial role in the formation of the Indian Banks' Association, which came into existence on 26 September 1946.

== Political career ==
He was a member of the Indian legislative Assembly for fourteen years, from the years 1929 to 1943. In 1941 to 1943 he was appointed to the Viceroy's Executive Council with the key portfolio of Supply. He was a member of the Constituent Assembly of India for the years 1948–1949. After the independence of India, he was appointed Governor of the United Provinces and, later, Uttar Pradesh for the years 1949–52.

== Personal life ==
He was the father of Russi Mody, Piloo Mody and Kali Mody. He died on 9 March 1969, aged 87.

== Honours ==
Mody was knighted as a Knight Commander of the Order of the British Empire (KBE) in the 1935 Birthday and Silver Jubilee Honours List. In 1946, he was appointed a Grand Commander of the Order of George I by George II, the King of Greece for services during the Second World War. A road in Mumbai is named after him as Sir Homi Mody Street.

== Bibliography ==
As an author he wrote books including:

- The Political Future of India; Reflections (1908)
- Biography of Feroz Shah Mehta
- Wise and Otherwise.
