= Harendra Kumar Mukarje =

Indian politician (1887–1956)

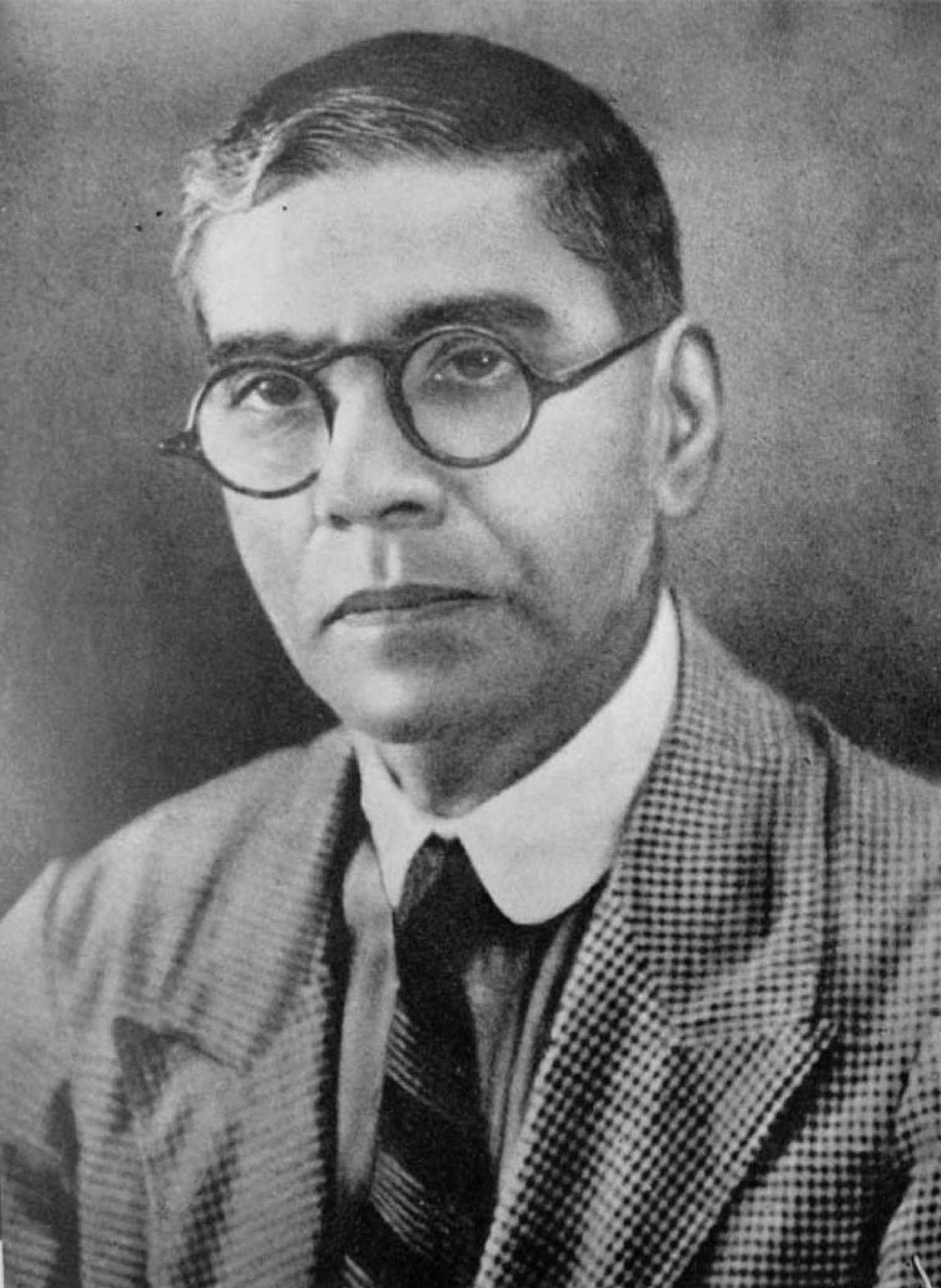

3rd Governor of West Bengal
- In office 1 November 1951 – 7 August 1956
- Preceded by: Kailash Nath Katju
- Succeeded by: Phani Bhusan Chakravartti (acting)

Vice President of Constituent Assembly of India
- President: Rajendra Prasad
- Preceded by: Office established

Chairman of Minorities Sub-Committee
- Leader: Vallabhbhai Patel

Personal details
- Born: 3 October 1887 Calcutta, Bengal Presidency, British India
- Died: 7 August 1956 (aged 68) Calcutta, West Bengal, India
- Party: Indian National Congress
- Education: University of Calcutta
- Occupation: Politician, Educationalist, Activist

Harendra Kumar Mukarje (3 October 1887 – 7 August 1956), also spelt as H. K. Mukarje, was the Vice-President of the Constituent Assembly of India for drafting the Constitution of India before Partition of India, and the third Governor of West Bengal after India became a republic with partition into India and Pakistan.

He was an educationalist, prominent Christian leader of Bengal, and was the chairman of the Minority rights sub-committee and Provincial constitution committee of the Constituent Assembly—consisting of indirectly elected representatives to draft the Constitution of India, including for provinces of present Pakistan and Bangladesh (then East Bengal) – the assembly considered only Muslims and Sikhs as religious minorities – after India became republic, the same Constituent Assembly became the first Parliament of India in 1947.

== Biography ==
Born into a Hindu family in Bengal, he did MA, PhD, D.Litt. Harendra Kumar Mukarje's doctorate was in English literature, and he went on to become a philanthropist, and teacher.

At Calcutta University, he served at various positions—as lecturer, secretary, council of Post-Graduate Teaching in Arts, Inspector of Colleges, professor of English from 1936 to 1940, and head of the English department. He was later nominated to "Bengal Legislative Council" and elected to "Bengal Legislative Assembly."

While he was vice-president of the Constituent Assembly of India, and chairman of the Minority rights sub-committee and Provincial constitution committee, he began suggesting reservation for the upliftment of minorities in all fields, including politics. With partition of India, he changed his stance and limited it to provision for preservation of the language and culture of minorities—over the period, this has been interpreted to open educational institutes and other institutions by minority communities.

Following the dissolution of the Constituent Assembly, Dr. Harendra Kumar Mukarje was appointed Governor of West Bengal from 1 November 1951 through 7 August 1956. While working as Bengal governor, he served as the president of "Desh Bandhu Memorial Society" from 1953. He died in office on 7 August 1956 in Kolkata.

== Christian leader ==
He represented Bengali Christians in Bengal, and after his entry into national politics, he was elected as the president of All India Conference of Indian Christians, representing All-Indian Christians other than Anglo-Indians, who were organized as the All India Anglo-Indian Association.

He was also the member of Indian National Congress and participated in national movements representing the Bengali Christian community. He confessed to his community as:

We have to demonstrate by every word we utter and by every act we perform that the professing of a different religious faith has not tended in the least to make us less Indian in our outlook than our non-Christian brethren, that we are prepared to play our part and to shoulder our share of the responsibility in every kind of work undertaken for the benefit of our country as a whole.

He was the only candidate to be unanimously nominated for Vice-Presidency, with a resolution moved by Pattabhi Sitaramayya, a member of Indian National Congress and Constituent Assembly of India; consequently, he expressed his gratitude in the Constituent Assembly of India that met in the Constitution Hall, New Delhi as:

Mr. President, Ladies and Gentlemen. I trust that you will accept in advance an apology because I am going to place before you a history of the way in which from a Christian Communalist I became a Christian Indian Nationalist. It was merely an accident that brought me into politics. It was a case of zid and nothing else. Some people had egged me to seek election, but at the last moment deserted me and I was determined to show that though I have been a school-master all, through my life, It was possible for a schoolmaster to be a better man than the black-mailing voter. It so happened that the gentleman against whom I was fighting was a more experienced man with a longer record of service to the community than myself. It also happened that in those days it was more profitable to appeal to communal than to national feelings. I admit with a sense of the deepest shame that I dabbled with the matter. He appealed to communalism. I appealed even more strongly to communalism and that is how I got into politics. But when as President of the All-India Council of Indian Christians the members requested me that I should go and visit poor Christians it was then and then only that I found out that the cause of the 'poor Christian Indian was no better than the cause of the equally poor Hindu Indian and the equally poor Mussalman Indian. It was then that from a Communalist I became a nationalist and if today you have done me the honour of putting me into the position of the Vice-President. be sure that while I am there. I shall not act as a communalist, but I shall remember the duty which I owe to the poor masses of my country. I am not a lawyer. I am not even a politician, Forty-two years of my life have been Passed as a teacher or as a student. I do not know whether I am qualified to discharge the duties with which you have entrusted me but I do know one Win. that I shall try to do it honestly and thereby I hope to add to the dignity of the House and add to the reputation of my community, which has hitherto had at least one thing in its favour. and that is, that It has never stood directly or indirectly against the political progress of my country.

Preceded by Kailash Nath Katju	Governor of West Bengal; 1951–1956	Succeeded by Phani Bhusan Chakravartti

== See also ==
- Constituent Assembly – India
