= Chandulal Madhavlal Trivedi =

Indian administrator and civil servant

Sir Chandulal Madhavlal Trivedi KCSI CIE OBE ICS
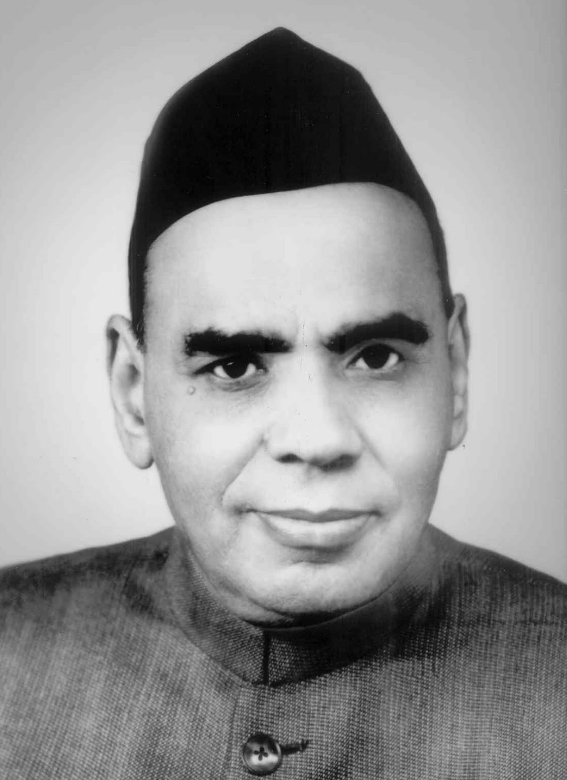
- Chandulal Madhavlal Trivedi

1st Governor of Andhra Pradesh
- In office 1 November 1956 – 1 August 1957
- Chief Minister: Neelam Sanjiva Reddy
- Preceded by: Office Established
- Succeeded by: Bhim Sen Sachar

1st Governor of Andhra state
- In office 1 October 1953 – 31 October 1956
- Chief Minister: Tanguturi Prakasam; Bezawada Gopala Reddy
- Preceded by: Office Established
- Succeeded by: Office Abolished

1st Governor of Punjab
- In office 15 August 1947 – 11 March 1953
- Chief Minister: Gopi Chand Bhargava; Bhim Sen Sachar
- Preceded by: Office Established
- Succeeded by: Sir Chandeshwar Prasad Narayan Singh

3rd Governor of Orissa
- In office 1 April 1946 – 14 August 1947
- Chief Minister: Harekrushna Mahatab
- Preceded by: Hawthorne Lewis
- Succeeded by: Kailash Nath Katju (After Independence)

Personal details
- Born: 2 July 1893 Kapadvanj, Kaira District, Bombay Presidency, British India (now Kheda district, Gujarat, India)
- Died: 15 March 1980 (aged 86) Kapadvanj, Kaira District (now Kheda district), Gujarat, India
- Spouse: Kusumben Chunilal Trivedi

Sir Chandulal Madhavlal Trivedi (2 July 1893 – 15 March 1980) was an Indian administrator and civil servant who served as the first Indian governor of the state of Punjab (then East Punjab) after Independence in 1947. He subsequently served as the first Governor of Andhra Pradesh from its creation in 1953 until 1957.

== Life and early career ==
Trivedi was born and raised in Kapadvanj in Kaira (now Kheda) District, then in the Bombay Presidency of British India and now in Gujarat. After completing his studies at Bombay University and at St John's College, Oxford, he successfully sat the Indian Civil Service exams in 1916 and was appointed to the service the following October, returning to India in December 1917.

He first served in the Central Provinces as an assistant commissioner (officiating deputy commissioner from January 1924), and as the provincial director of industries and registrar of cooperative societies from November 1926; until then, he had served in the position in an officiating role from June 1925. In March 1927, Trivedi was confirmed as a deputy commissioner, and was posted to the Home Department of the Government of India as a deputy secretary in May 1932. He was advanced to the rank of officiating joint secretary in April 1934 and in an officiating role, was appointed the chief secretary of the Central Provinces in October 1937. During the Second World War, Trivedi was promoted to additional secretary (war) with the central government in March 1942, and was promoted to full secretary that July.

Following the end of the war, and with the end of the British Raj imminent, Trivedi was appointed the first Indian and last British-appointed Governor of Odisha in late 1945. He formally succeeded to the governorship in April 1946, serving until 14 August 1947, the day before India's independence from Britain. On the same day, he was appointed the first Indian governor of the new Indian province of East Punjab (part of which is now Haryana).

== After Independence and later life ==
In the wake of Partition, with Lahore, the former provincial capital of the undivided Punjab, now in Pakistan, Trivedi was immediately beset with numerous challenges upon assuming the governorship of East Punjab. His ministers were forced to work without offices, clerical staff or communication networks; with all telephone and telegraph lines only routed through Lahore, direct contact could not be made with Delhi. The limited infrastructure soon complicated the government's response to the communal massacres which raged across the region during the autumn of 1947. In addition, Trivedi faced severe difficulties in supporting the massive influx of Hindu and Sikh refugees flooding into East Punjab from Pakistan.

Trivedi was the first governor of the renamed state of Punjab from 1950 to 1953, the first governor of Andhra Pradesh from 1 October 1953 till 1 August 1957.

He also was a member of The Planning Commission of India from 28 October 1957 till 1 December 1963; and was the deputy Chairperson of the Planning Commission of India from 22 September 1963 till 2 December 1963, who served as the President of the Bharat Scouts and Guides from February 1967 to October 1973.

After a long, happy and meaningful life, Trivedi retired and spent the rest of his life in his hometown, where he died on 15 March 1980, aged 86.

== Personal life ==
At a young age, he was married to Kusum, a lady who came from a family belonging to his own community and also based in Kapadvanj, in a match arranged by their families in the usual Indian manner. Kusum, later known as Lady Kusum Chunilal Trivedi, was awarded the Kaisar-i-Hind Medal in the final imperial honours' list issued on 14 August 1947, the last day of British rule in India.

== Honours ==
He was appointed an Officer of the Order of the British Empire (OBE) in the 1931 New Year Honours list, a Companion of the Order of the Indian Empire (CIE) in the 1935 Birthday Honours list and as a Companion of the Order of the Star of India (CSI) in the 1941 Birthday Honours list. He was knighted in the 1945 Birthday Honours list, and was invested with his knighthood by the Viceroy, Lord Wavell at Viceroy's House (now Rashtrapati Bhavan) in New Delhi on 18 August of that year. Later the same year, on 21 December 1945, he was appointed a Knight Commander of the Order of the Star of India (KCSI).

After India became independent, the government of India also honoured him by awarding him the Padma Vibhushan, the second-highest civilian award of free India, in 1956. However, few contemporary Hindu magazines (Vishaal Bharat of November 1945, page number 334) had published under the editorial commentary about him, to be extremely obedient to the British and the governorship of Odisha was given to him as a reward for his services to the British in India.

Chandulal Madhavlal Trivedi

Preceded by Justice Bhuvaneshwar Prasad Sinha	Presidents of the Bharat Scouts and Guides; 1967–1973	Succeeded by Dharma Vira
