= 1889 in India =

- Centuries: 17th; 18th; 19th; 20th; 21st
- Decades: 1860s; 1870s; 1880s; 1890s; 1900s
- See also: List of years in India; Timeline of Indian history

Events in the year 1889 in India.

== Incumbents ==
- Empress of India – Queen Victoria
- Viceroy of India – Henry Petty-Fitzmaurice, 5th Marquess of Lansdowne
- Nawab of Rampur — Hamid Ali Khan of Rampur

== Events ==
- Phulmoni Dasi rape case, case involving the death of a 10-year-old child bride which resulted in legal reforms on the age of consent
- 14 November — Chin-Lushai Expedition of 1889-90, offensive on the tribes of the Chin and Lushai Hills

== Law ==
- Commissioners For Oaths Act (British statute)
- Interpretation Act 1889 (British statute)

== Births ==
- 30 January — Jaishankar Prasad, writer and dramatist (d. 1937)
- 28 February — Babu Chotelal Shrivastava, independence fighter (d. 1976)
- 1 March — Gopi Chand Bhargava, first Chief Minister of Punjab (d. 1966)
- 1 April — Dr Keshav Baliram Hedgewar, founder of the Rastriya Swayamsevak Sangh (RSS) (f. 1925), social reformer and political activist (d. 1940)
- 4 April — Makhanlal Chaturvedi, Chhayavad writer (d. 1968)
- 1 July — Benegal Rama Rau, fourth governor of the Reserve Bank of India (d. 1968)
- 5 August — Muzaffar Ahmad, communist politician and journalist (d. 1973)
- 16 August — Prabhu Dayal Himatsingka, Indian National Congress politician (d. 1991)
- 3 September — Sadhu Sundar Singh, Christian missionary (d. 1929)
- 6 September — Sarat Chandra Bose, barrister and independence activist (d. 1950)
- 4 November — Jamnalal Bajaj, politician and industrialist (d. 1942)
- 14 November — Jawaharlal Nehru, politician and 1st Prime Minister of India (d. 1964)
- 3 December — khudiram Bose, independence fighter and martyr (d. 1908)
- 7 December — Radhakamal Mukerjee, social scientist (d. 1968)
- 23 December — Mehr Chand Mahajan, third Chief Justice of India (d. 1967)
- 25 December — Chaudhry Khaliquzzaman, leader of the All-India Muslim League (d. 1973)

=== Full date unknown ===
- Shapoorji Mistry, businessman (d. 19??)
- Rafiq Ahmed, communist activist (d. 1982)
- Keshavrao Date, actor (d. 1971).
- Amar Nath Kak, lawyer and author (d. 1963).
- Bhai Balmukund, independence fighter and member of the 1912 Delhi conspiracy (d. 1915)
- Shamsuddin Ahmed, politician (d. 1969)

=== Organization foundations ===
- Anyonya Co-operative Bank, Vadodora bank
- Delhi Cloth & General Mills, textile conglomerate
- KRBL Limited, rice company
- Mohun Bagan A.C., sports club

== Deaths ==
- 14 December — Tantia Bhil, independence fighter (b. 1842)
