= 1897 in India =

- Centuries: 17th; 18th; 19th; 20th; 21st
- Decades: 1870s; 1880s; 1890s; 1900s; 1910s
- See also: List of years in India; Timeline of Indian history

Events in the year 1897 in India.

== Incumbents ==
- Empress of India – Queen Victoria
- Viceroy of India – Victor Bruce, 9th Earl of Elgin

== Events ==
- National income - ₹5,561 million
- The Indian famine of 1896–97 comes to a close
- Scindia School is established in Gwalior
- Frontier War of 1897–98
- Battle of Saragarhi
- 12 June – The 8.0 M_{w} Assam earthquake shook northeastern India with a maximum Mercalli intensity of X (Extreme), killing 1,542.
- Construction of Indian education service

== Law ==
- Epidemic Diseases Act
- General Clauses Act
- Indian Fisheries Act

== Births ==
- 23 January – Subhas Chandra Bose, one of the leaders of the Indian independence movement (dies 1945).
- 8 February – Zakir Husain, politician and third president of India (dies 1969).
- 19 April – Peter de Noronha, businessman and civil servant (dies 1970).
- 26 April – Nitin Bose, Indian film director, cinematographer and screenwriter (dies 1986).
- 3 May – V. K. Krishna Menon, nationalist and politician (dies 1974).
- 15 October – Mudicondan Venkatarama Iyer, Carnatic singer and musicologist (dies 1975).
- 2 November – Sohrab Modi, Indian Parsi stage and film actor, director and producer (dies 1984).
- Sahana Devi Indian singer and niece of Chittaranjan Das is born (dies 1990).

== Deaths ==
- Abdul Ghani Saheb Saudagar, trader and business person dies (born 1843)
