= 1990 in India =

- Centuries: 18th; 19th; 20th; 21st
- Decades: 1970s; 1980s; 1990s; 2000s; 2010s
- See also: List of years in India; Timeline of Indian history

Events in the year 1990 in the Republic of India.

== Incumbents ==
- President of India – R. Venkataraman
- Prime Minister of India – V. P. Singh until 10 November, Chandra Shekhar Singh
- Vice President of India – Shankar Dayal Sharma
- Chief Justice of India – Raghunandan Swarup Pathak until 25 September, Ranganath Misra

=== Governors ===
- Andhra Pradesh – Kumud Ben Joshi (until 7 February), Krishan Kant (starting 7 February)
- Arunachal Pradesh –
  - until 16 March: R. D. Pradhan
  - 16 March-8 May: Raja Gopal Singh
  - starting 8 May: Devi Das Thakur
- Assam – Anisetti Raghuvir (until 2 May), Devi Das Thakur (starting 2 May)
- Bihar –
  - until 2 February: Jagannath Pahadia
  - 2 February-16 February: G.G. Sohoni
  - starting 16 February: Mohammad Saleem
- Goa – Khurshed Alam Khan
- Gujarat –
  - until 2 May: Ram Krishna Trivedi
  - 2 May-21 December: Mahipal Shastri
  - starting 21 December: Sarup Singh
- Haryana – Hari Anand Barari (until 6 February), Dhanik Lal Mandal (starting 6 February)
- Himachal Pradesh –
  - until 12 January: R. K. S. Ghandhi
  - 16 February-20 December: B. Rachaiah
  - starting 20 December: Virendra Verma
- Jammu and Kashmir –
  - until 19 January: K. V. Krishna Rao
  - 19 January-26 May: Jagmohan Malhotra
  - starting 26 May: Girish Chandra Saxena
- Karnataka – Pendekanti Venkatasubbaiah (until 5 February), Bhanu Pratap Singh (starting 5 February)
- Kerala –
  - until 12 February: Ram Dulari Sinha
  - 12 February-20 December: Sarup Singh
  - starting 20 December: B. Rachaiah
- Madhya Pradesh – Sarla Grewal (until 5 February), M. A. Khan (starting 6 February)
- Maharashtra – Ram Dulari Sinha (until 18 January), C. Subramaniam (starting 15 February)
- Manipur – Chintamani Panigrahi
- Meghalaya – A. A. Rahim (until 8 May), Madhukar Dighe (starting 8 May)
- Mizoram – W. A. Sangma (until 7 February), Swaraj Kaushal (starting 8 February)
- Nagaland – Gopal Singh (until 3 May), M. M. Thomas (starting 3 May)
- Odisha – Saiyid Nurul Hasan (until 6 February), Yagya Dutt Sharma (starting 7 February)
- Punjab –
  - until 14 June: Nirmal Kumar Mukherjee
  - 14 June-18 December: Virendra Verma
  - starting 18 December: Om Prakash Malhotra
- Rajasthan –
  - until 3 February: Sukhdev Prasad
  - 3 February-14 February: Milap Chand Jain
  - starting 14 February: Debi Prasad Chattopadhyaya
- Sikkim – S.K. Bhatnagar (until 7 February), Radhakrishna Hariram Tahiliani (starting 7 February)
- Tamil Nadu – P. C. Alexander (until 23 May), Surjit Singh Barnala (starting 23 May)
- Tripura – Sultan Singh (until 11 February), K. V. Raghunatha Reddy (starting 12 February)
- Uttar Pradesh – Mohammed Usman Arif (until 11 February), B. Satya Narayan Reddy (starting 12 February)
- West Bengal – T. V. Rajeswar (until 7 February), Saiyid Nurul Hasan (starting 7 February)

== Events ==
- National income - ₹5,761,092 million

=== January - June ===
- 19 January – An insurgency breaks out in Kashmir Valley which leads to Exodus of Kashmiri Hindus, inflaming tensions with Pakistan. New Delhi dissolves the state assembly and imposes direct rule.
- 14 February – Indian Airlines Flight 605 crashes near the HAL Airport in Bangalore.
- March – The last Indian troops are withdrawn from Sri Lanka.
- 15 April – Food poisoning kills 450 guests at an engagement party in Uttar Pradesh.
- 15 May – Agriculture and Rural Debt Relief Scheme providing debt relief up to ₹ 10,000 to small borrowers from Public Sector Banks and Regional Rural Banks announced.
- 4–10 May – Andhra Pradesh cyclone ravages southern India, killing nearly 1,000 people.
- 30 May - Communists brutally raped and killed two workers of UNICEF at Bantala, West Bengal for whistle blowing against corruption.

=== July - December ===
- 7 August- V. P. Singh announces implementation of Mandal commission report.
- 19 September - Rajiv Goswami, a commerce student in Deshbandhu College attempted Self-immolation as part of Mandal Commission protests of 1990.
- 25 September - Ram Rath Yatra commenced from Somnath.
- 23 October - Government of Bihar arrest L. K. Advani at Samastipur during rath yatra.
- 30 October - Ayodhya firing incident on Kar sevaks.
- November – V.P. Singh resigns as prime minister and is succeeded by Janata Dal dissident Chandra Shekhar.
- 22 December – S. Venkitaramanan becomes Governor of RBI

== Births ==
- 1 January – Ali Murtaza, cricketer.
- 10 January – Aishwarya Rajesh, actress.
- 5 February – Bhuvneshwar Kumar, cricketer.
- 20 February – Hiphop Tamizha, actor, music director and singer.
- 2 March - Tiger Shroff, Actor
- 9 March - Arif Khan, Alpine skier.
- 10 March – Ritu Varma, Actress.
- 17 March – Saina Nehwal, Indian badminton player.
- 17 April – Beno Zephine, first 100% visually challenged officer in the Indian Foreign Service.
- 20 April – Merin Joseph, Indian Police Service officer.
- 19 May – Siddarth Kaul, cricketer.
- 23 July – Yuzvendra Chahal, cricketer.
- 27 July – Kriti Sanon, actress.

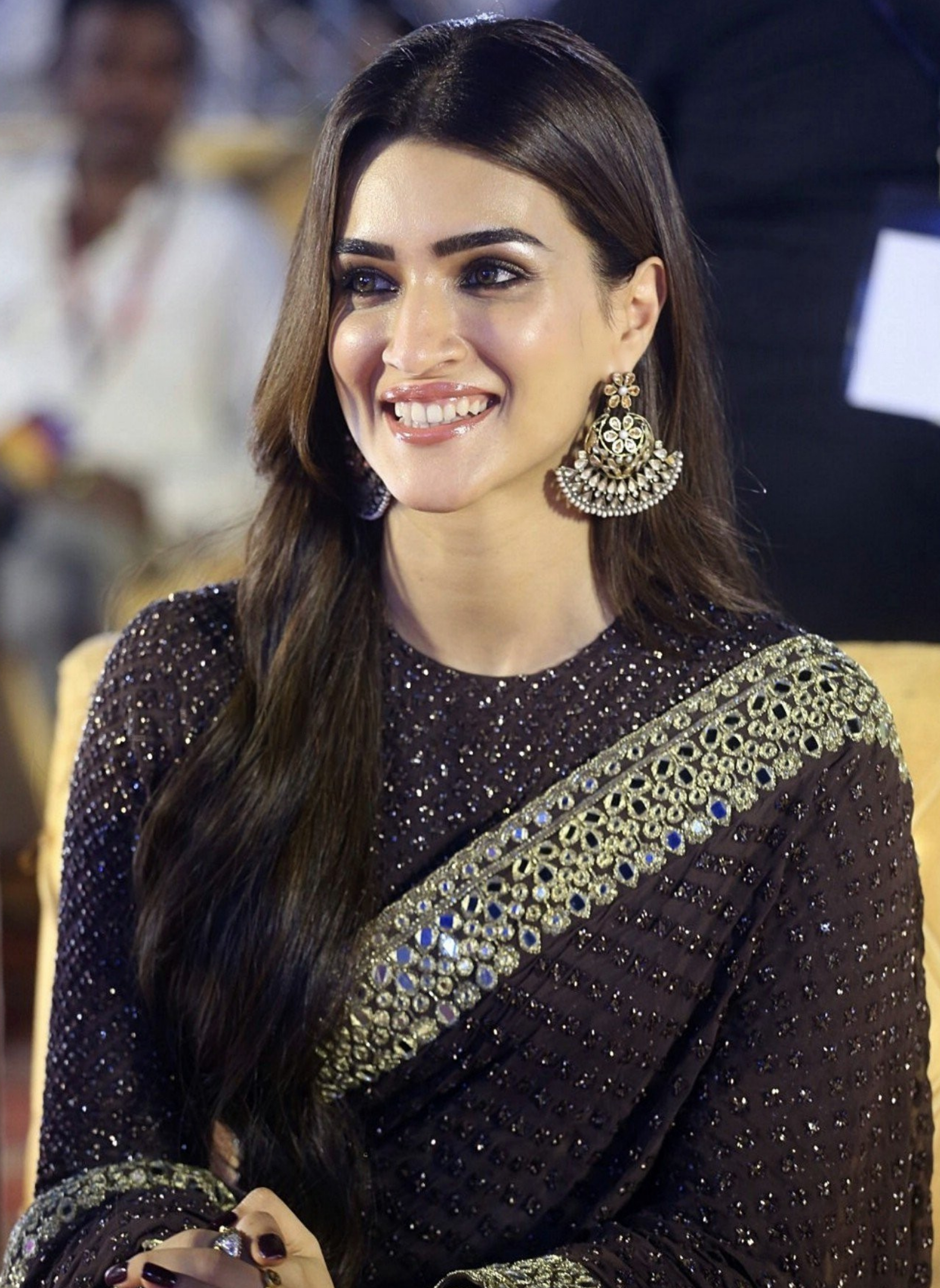
Kriti Sanon

- 3 September – Mohammed Shami, cricketer.
- 6 September – Aishwarya Lekshmi, actress.
- 14 September – Suryakumar Yadav, cricketer.
- 13 October – Pooja Hegde, actress.

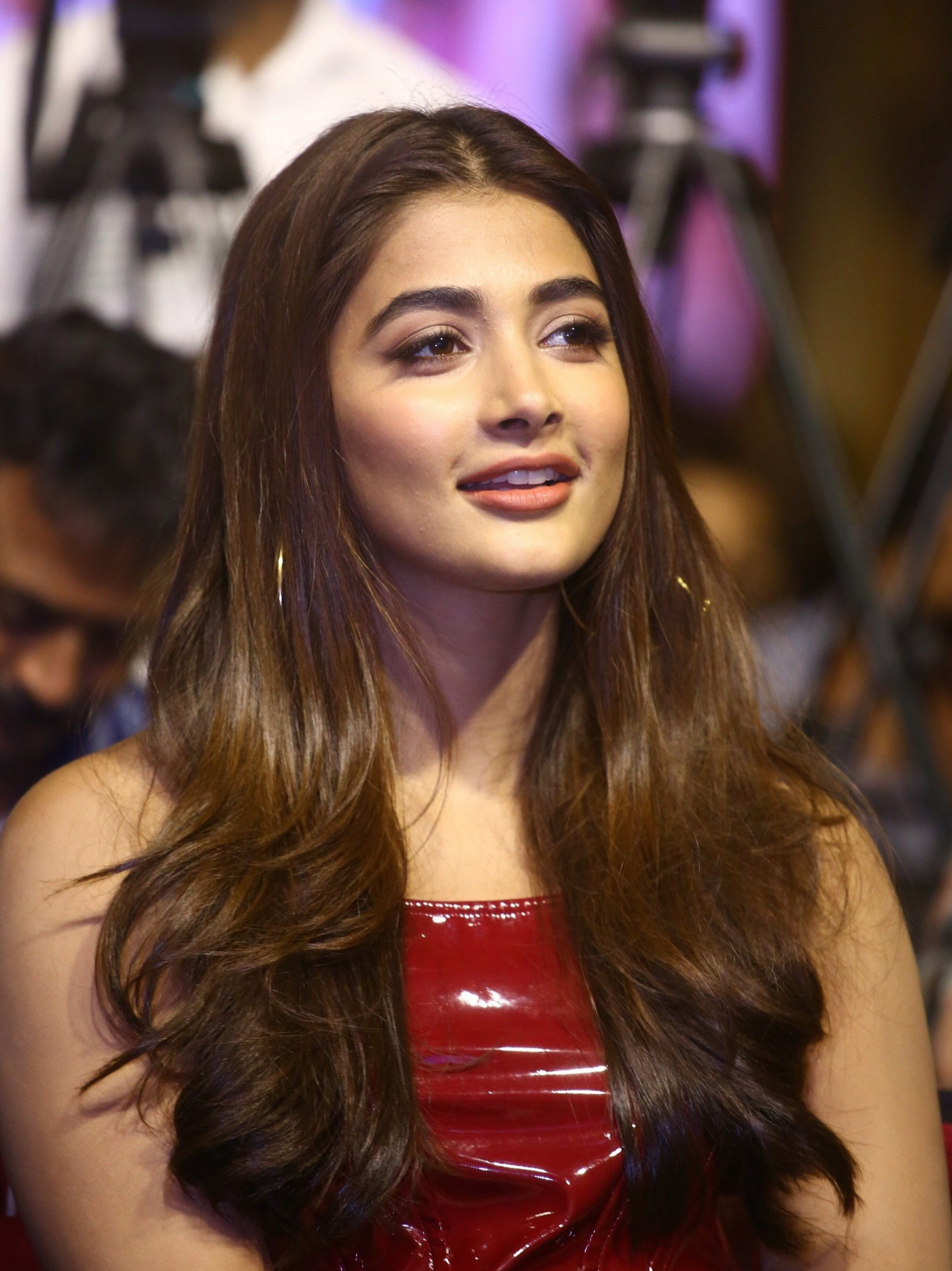
Kriti Sanon

- 16 October – Anirudh Ravichander, music composer and singer.
- 14 November – Pugazh (actor), actor and comedian.
- 16 November – Tejasvi Surya, Lok Sabha M.P.
- 30 November – Rashi Khanna, actress.
- 11 December – Vinayakan, actor, playback singer, and composer.
- 13 December – Regina Cassandra, actress and model.

== Deaths ==
- 14 January – Mani Madhava Chakyar, master Chakyar Koothu and Koodiyattam artist (b. 1899).
- 19 January – Rajneesh, aka OSHO mystic, guru and spiritual leader (b. 11 December 1931)
- 29 March – Adoor Bhasi, actor, writer, journalist, singer and film producer (b. 1927).
- 30 April - Angami Zapu Phizo, Naga separatist leader (b. 1913)
- 1 June - Maharaj Charan Singh, Fourth Satguru of Radha Soami Satsang Beas (born 1916).
- 7 July - Laldenga, Mizo Nationalist leader. (b. 1927)
- 30 September – Shankar Nag, actor and director (b. 1954).
- 21 October – Prabhat Ranjan Sarkar, philosopher, author, social revolutionary, poet, composer and linguist (b. 1921).
- 30 October – Vinod Mehra, actor (b. 1945).
- 25 December – Chandrakant T. Patel, cotton scientist (b. 1917).

== See also ==
- Bollywood films of 1990
