= Udupa =

Udupa is a surname belonging to Shivalli Brahmin Tulu community who are primarily from the Tulunadu (Southern Coastal Karnataka) region.

Traditionally involved in priestly duties, teaching, astrology, or scholarship.

Many Udupas today are professionals across IT, education, science, etc

Notable people with the surname include:

- Archana Udupa (born 1983), Indian singer
- Giridhar Udupa (born 1980), Indian percussionist
- H. V. K. Udupa (1921–2003), Indian physical chemist
- Jayaram K. Udupa, Indian-American radiologist
- K. N. Udupa (1920–1992), Indian surgeon
- Sahana Udupa, Indian media anthropologist
