= Sahana =

Sahana may refer to:

- Sahana (raga), a rāga in Carnatic music (South Indian classical music)
- Sahana (TV series), an Indian Tamil-language TV series
- Sahana, Hooghly, a village in West Bengal, India
- Sahana Software Foundation, an organization promoting free and open-source software (FOSS) for disaster and emergency management

== People ==
- Sahana Bajpaie, Indian singer-songwriter and contemporary Rabindra Sangeet vocalist
- Sahana Bajracharya, Nepalese model and television personality
- Sahana Devi, Indian singer of Rabindra Sangeet, niece of Chittaranjan Das
- Shahana Goswami, Indian actress
- Sahana Kumari, Indian high jumper
- Sahana Pradhan, Nepalese politician
- Sahana Udupa, Indian anthropologist of digital media
