= 1911 in India =

- Centuries: 18th; 19th; 20th; 21st
- Decades: 1890s; 1900s; 1910s; 1920s; 1930s
- See also: List of years in India; Timeline of Indian history

Events in the year 1911 in India.

== Incumbents ==
- Emperor of India – George V
- Viceroy of India – Charles Hardinge, 1st Baron Hardinge of Penshurst

== Events ==
- National income - ₹11,822 million
- December 11 - Coronation ceremonies in new capital of India, New Delhi, site of Humayun's Tomb
- 18 February – Henri Pequet, flying a Humber biplane, carried mail from Allahabad to Naini junction which was the first flight in India.
- 29 July – Mohun Bagan was the first Indian team and the first Asian team to have defeated a foreign team when they won the 1911 IFA Shield defeating East Yorkshire Regiment 2–1 to lift the IFA Shield.
- 29 August – The Diocese of Kottayam was erected on this day (Kerala, India) for the Knanaya Catholic people of the Syro-Malabar Church. In 2005 the diocese was raised to the rank of Archdiocese.
- 11 December – Coronation in New Delhi of George V and Queen Mary as Emperor of India and Empress consort respectively.
- 12 December – The Delhi Durbar is held, formally announcing the coronation of George V, and his assumption of title Emperor of India.
- 12 December – The capital of India is shifted to New Delhi from Calcutta (now Kolkata).
- 27 December – The Jana Gana Mana, which would become free India's national anthem, is sung for the first time, at the Indian National Congress annual convention at Calcutta.
- The first Urdu language typewriter is made available.
- The Tata family starts the first steel mill in Bihar.

== Law ==
- Re-enactment with modifications of the Seditious Meetings Act
- Geneva Convention Act (British statute)

== Births ==
- 1 April – Fauja Singh, centenarian marathon runner (died 2025)
- 11 April – Malik Sher Bahadur, Pakistani army officer
- 24 July – Pannalal Ghosh, flute (bānsurī) player and composer (died 1960).
- 21 August – Sawai Man Singh II of Jaipur, last ruling Maharaja of Jaipur (died 1970).
- 11 September – Lala Amarnath, cricketer (died 2000).
- 20 September – Shriram Sharma Acharya, seer, sage and Founder of the All World Gayatri Pariwar (died 1990).
- 12 October – Vijay Merchant, cricketer (died 1987).
- 13 October – Ashok Kumar, actor (died 2001).
- 28 October – Piara Singh Gill, physicist (died 2002).
- 6 December – Dinesh Gupta, freedom fighter and revolutionary, executed (died 1931).

=== Full date unknown ===
- Narayan Apte, accomplice in assassination of Mahatma Gandhi, executed (died 1949).
- Rappal Sangameswaraier Krishnan, scientist and researcher (died 1999).

== Deaths ==
- 31 August – Mahbub Ali Khan, Asaf Jah VI, sixth Nizam of Hyderabad (born 1866).
