= Jayaram (name) =

- Gender: Male

Other names
- Alternative spelling: Jeyarama
- Variant forms: Jayarama, Jayaraman

Jayaram is an Indian male given name. Due to the South Indian tradition of using patronymic surnames it may also be a surname for males and females.

== Notable people ==
=== Given name ===
- Jayaram (Jayaram Subramaniam, born 1965), Indian actor
- Jayaram Jayalalithaa (1948–2016), Indian politician and actress
- Jayaram Khadka (born 1972), Nepali skier
- Jayaram Padikkal, Indian police officer
- Jayaram Pangi (born 1955), Indian politician
- Jayarama Reddiar, Indian politician
- Jayaram Shiledar (1915–1992), Indian actor and singer
- Jayaram K Udupa, Indian-American scientist

=== Surname ===
- Kalidas Jayaram, Indian actor
- Ajay Jayaram, Indian badminton player
- Atma Jayaram (1915–1990), Indian intelligence chief
- Gayatri Jayaraman, Indian actress
- Gummanur Jayaram (born 1968), Indian politician
- K. Jayaram, Indian photographer
- Jayaram K R, Indian politician
- Karthik Jayaram, Indian actor
- Kavin Jayaram (born 1980), Malaysian comedian
- Parvathy Jayaram (born 1970), Indian actress
- Poornima Jayaram (Poornima Bhagyaraj, born 1970), Indian actress
- Sai Jayalakshmy Jayaram (born 1977), Indian tennis player
- Udupi Jayaram (1929–2004), Indian choreographer
- Vani Jayaram, Indian singer

== See also ==
- Jayaraman
- Jayaraj
