= 1899 in India =

- Centuries: 17th; 18th; 19th; 20th; 21st
- Decades: 1870s; 1880s; 1890s; 1900s; 1910s
- See also: List of years in India; Timeline of Indian history

Events in the year 1899 in India.

== Incumbents ==
- Empress of India – Queen Victoria
- Viceroy of India – Victor Bruce, 9th Earl of Elgin
- Viceroy of India – George Curzon, 1st Marquess Curzon of Kedleston (from 6 January)

== Events ==
- National income - ₹6,715 million
- 4 January - Fire from a quarantined Indian made vessel gutted 300 homes and numerous British owned factories in Fort Kochi.
- 1 May - Swami Vivekananda founded the Ramakrishna Mission at Calcutta.
- 6 June - Sivakasi riots of 1899 between Nadar and Maravar communities.
- 10 November - Sir Ranbir Singh is invested with full ruling powers over the princely state of Jind He ascended the throne as Maharaja of Jind at the age of 8.
- 31 December - The Sunset of the Century written by Rabindranath Tagore.

=== Dates unknown ===
- Indian famine of 1899–1900

== Law ==
- Indian Stamp Act
- Government Buildings Act
- Glanders and Farcy Act

== Births ==
- 15 February – Mani Madhava Chakyar, master Chakyar Koothu and Koodiyattam artist (died 1990).
- 30 March - Sharadindu Bandyopadhyay, Bengali story writer and novelist (died 1970).
- 19 July – Banaphool, author, playwright and poet (died 1979).
- 1 August – Kamala Nehru, activist and spouse of Jawaharlal Nehru (died 1936)
- 10 October – Baldev Upadhyaya, Sanskrit scholar, literary historian, essayist and critic (died 1999).
- 26 December - Udham Singh, freedom fighter (died 1940).
