= 1895 in India =

- Centuries: 17th; 18th; 19th; 20th; 21st
- Decades: 1870s; 1880s; 1890s; 1900s; 1910s
- See also: List of years in India; Timeline of Indian history

Events in the year 1895 in India.

== Incumbents ==
- Empress of India – Queen Victoria
- Viceroy of India – Victor Bruce, 9th Earl of Elgin

== Events ==
- April - Kalugumalai riots of 1895
- 1895 Birthday Honours
- Chitral Expedition
- National income - ₹5,371 million

== Law ==
- Government Grants Act

== Births ==
- 12 January – Yellapragada Subbarow, medical scientist (died 1948).
- 11 September – Vinoba Bhave, freedom fighter and teacher (died 1982).
- 21 September- [Annapurnanand], Hindi Writer (D. 1962)
- 1 October- Nawabzada Liaquat Ali Khan, First Prime Minister of Pakistan, Quaid-e-Millat (Leader of the Nation) and Shaheed-e-Millat (Martyr of the Nation) (D.16 October 1951)
- 13 October – Alice Bloomfield, Scottish gynaecological surgeon and barrister

=== Full date unknown ===
- Gokulchandra Nag, writer and artist (died 1925).
