= Lok Bhavan, Gandhinagar =

Residence of the Governor of Gujarat

Lok Bhavan
- Interactive map of the Lok Bhavan area

General information
- Coordinates: 23.223580°N 72.675231°E
- Current tenants: Acharya Devvrat
- Owner: Government of Gujarat

References
- Official Website

Lok Bhavan formerly Raj Bhavan (translation: Government House) is the official residence of the governor of Gujarat. It is located in the capital city of Gandhinagar, Gujarat. The present governor of Gujarat is Shri Acharya Dev Vrat.

Yatkinchit is the in-house magazine of Raj Bhavan.

== See also ==
- Government Houses of the British Indian Empire
