= 1905 in India =

- Centuries: 18th; 19th; 20th; 21st
- Decades: 1880s; 1890s; 1900s; 1910s; 1920s
- See also: List of years in India; Timeline of Indian history

Events in the year 1905 in India.

== Incumbents ==
- Emperor of India – Edward VII
- Viceroy of India – George Curzon, 1st Marquess Curzon of Kedleston
- Viceroy of India – Gilbert Elliot-Murray-Kynynmound, 4th Earl of Minto (from 18 November)

== Events ==
- National income - ₹9,910 million
- 4 April – The 7.8 M_{s} Kangra earthquake shook the Kangra Valley with a maximum EMS-98 intensity of IX (Destructive), killing more than 20,000 people
- 16 October - Partition of Bengal.

=== Dates unknown ===
- George, Prince of Wales and Princess Mary tour India, 1905–06
- Smarthavicharam of Kuriyedathu Thatri.

== Law ==
- Indian Railway Board Act

== Births ==
- 2 January – Jainendra Kumar, novelist (died 1988).
- 16 January – Dr. Manubhai P. Vaidya, educationist and recipient of Best Teacher Award from Dr. S. Radhakrishnan, the President of India (died 1966).
- 18 March － Malti Bedekar, feminist author(died 2001).
- 21 March – Kushal Konwar, Indian National Congress President of Golaghat, later on first martyr of Quit India Movement. Died on 15 June 1943 hanged till death by British.
- 10 May – Pankaj Mullick, singer and composer (died 1978).
- 17 August – Bhudo Advani, actor (died 1985).
- 29 August – Dhyan Chand, field hockey player (died 1979).
- 9 September – Brahmarishi Hussain Sha, seventh head of Sri Viswa Viznana Vidya Adhyatmika Peetham and scholar (died 1981).
- 5 November – Sajjad Zaheer, Urdu writer and revolutionary (died 1973)
- 12 December – Mulk Raj Anand, novelist in English (died 2004).

=== Full date unknown ===
- Rashid Jahan, author, short story writer and playwright (died 1952).

== Deaths ==
- 19 January – Debendranath Tagore, founder in 1848 of the Brahmo Religion (born 1817).

Full Date Unknown

- Protap Chunder Mozoomdar, writer and leader of the Brahmo Samaj (born in 1840)
