= 1893 in India =

- Centuries: 17th; 18th; 19th; 20th; 21st
- Decades: 1870s; 1880s; 1890s; 1900s; 1910s
- See also: List of years in India; Timeline of Indian history

Events in the year 1893 in India.

== Incumbents ==
- Empress of India – Queen Victoria
- Viceroy of India – Henry Petty-Fitzmaurice, 5th Marquess of Lansdowne
- President of Theosophical Society – Annie Besant

== Events ==
- National income - ₹5,307 million
- 11 September – Swami Vivekananda represented Hinduism at the Parliament of the World's Religions (1893).

== Law ==
- Partition Act

== Births ==
- 5 January – Paramahansa Yogananda, yogi and guru (d.1952).
- 26 March – Dhirendra Nath Ganguly, film entrepreneur, actor and director (d.1978).
- 25 June – Zamin Ali, educator and author (d.1955).

=== Full date unknown ===
- K. C. Dey, actor (d.1962).
- Prabhas Chandra Lahiri, revolutionary (d.1974).
