= 1906 in India =

- Centuries: 18th; 19th; 20th; 21st
- Decades: 1880s; 1890s; 1900s; 1910s; 1920s
- See also: List of years in India; Timeline of Indian history

Events in the year 1906 in India.

== Incumbents ==
- Emperor of India – Edward VII
- Viceroy of India – Gilbert Elliot-Murray-Kynynmound, 4th Earl of Minto

== Events ==
- National income - ₹10,684 million
- George, Prince of Wales, and Princess Mary tour India, 1905-06
- 1 January – British India officially adopts Indian Standard Time.
- 11 September – Mahatma Gandhi coins the term Satyagraha to characterize the Non-violence movement in South Africa.
- 30 December – The All-India Muslim League, a political organization that represented the interests of Indian Muslims, is formed.
- First fertilizer factory in India (Ranipet, Tamil Nadu)

== Law ==
- Mamlatdars Courts Act
- Coinage Act

== Births ==
- 25 August – Kirupanandha Variyar, spiritual teacher and guru (died 1993).
- 3 November – Prithviraj Kapoor, actor, director, thespian (died 1972).
- 23 December – Edasseri Govindan Nair, poet, playwright and essayist (died 1974).

== Deaths ==
- 20 August - Anandamohan Bose, politician, academic and social reformer (born 1847)
- 2 October - Raja Ravi Varma, Indian painter.
- 21 December - Acharya Rajendrasuri, reformer in Śvetāmbara sect of Jainism (born 1827).
