= 1898 in India =

- Centuries: 17th; 18th; 19th; 20th; 21st
- Decades: 1870s; 1880s; 1890s; 1900s; 1910s
- See also: List of years in India; Timeline of Indian history

Events in the year 1898 in India

== Incumbents ==
- Empress of India – Queen Victoria
- Viceroy of India – Victor Bruce, 9th Earl of Elgin

== Events ==
- National income - ₹6,227 million
- Frontier War of 1897–98

== Law ==
- Code Of Criminal Procedure
- Indian Post Office Act
- Live-stock Importation Act

== Births ==
- 1 January – Binay Ranjan Sen, diplomat, Director General of the Food and Agriculture Organization (died 1993).
- 11 January – Vishnu Sakharam Khandekar, writer (died 1976).
- 13 January – Samsa, playwright, poet and novelist (died 1939).
- 5 August – Kumbakonam Rajamanickam Pillai, Tamil Carnatic music violinist (died 1970).
- 21 November – Rang Avadhoot, saint who is regarded as an incarnation of Lord Dattatreya, (died 1968).
- 25 November – Debaki Bose, film director, writer and actor (died 1971).
- 2 December – Indra Lal Roy, World War I flying ace, killed in action (died 1918).

=== Date unknown ===
- I. K. Taimni, chemist (died 1978).

== Deaths ==
- 1 October – Manilal Dwivedi (b. 1858), regarded as one of the most influential Gujarati writer and thinker, died at premature age, 40.
- March 27, SA(Syed Ahmed)Khan (Islamist scholar, Founder of Two Nations Theory), Aligarh.
- June 27, Dwarkanath Ganguly , a great social reformer and husband of Kadambini Ganguly died. According to the sources, he was suffering from Hepatitis.
