= 1902 in India =

- Centuries: 18th; 19th; 20th; 21st
- Decades: 1880s; 1890s; 1900s; 1910s; 1920s
- See also: List of years in India; Timeline of Indian history

Events in the year 1902 in India.

== Incumbents ==
- Emperor of India – Edward VII
- Viceroy of India – George Curzon, 1st Marquess Curzon of Kedleston

== Events ==
- National income - ₹8,283 million
- United Provinces of Agra and Oudh is established (exists until 1947)
- Anushilan Samiti established

== Births ==
- 12 August – K. G. Ambegaonkar governor of the Reserve Bank of India.
- 10 October – K. Shivaram Karanth, writer, social activist, environmentalist, Yakshagana artist, movie maker and thinker (died 1997).
- Harun Babunagari, Bangladeshi Islamic scholar and educationist (died 1986)

== Deaths ==
- 4 July – Swami Vivekananda, chief disciple of Ramakrishna and founder of Ramakrishna Mission (born 1863).
