= 1894 in India =

- Centuries: 17th; 18th; 19th; 20th; 21st
- Decades: 1870s; 1880s; 1890s; 1900s; 1910s
- See also: List of years in India; Timeline of Indian history

Events in the year 1894 in India.

== Incumbents ==
- Empress of India – Queen Victoria
- Viceroy of India – Henry Petty-Fitzmaurice, 5th Marquess of Lansdowne
- Viceroy of India – Victor Bruce, 9th Earl of Elgin (from 11 October)

== Events ==
- National income - ₹4,869 million
- Punjab National Bank was founded by Lala Lajpat Rai

== Law ==
- Prisons Act
- Land Acquisition Act

== Births ==
- 1 January – Satyendra Nath Bose, physicist (d.1974).
- 21 February – Shanti Swaroop Bhatnagar, scientist (d.1955).
- 25 February – Meher Baba, mystic and spiritual master (d.1969).
- 10 April – Ghanshyam Das Birla, businessman (d.1983).
- 20 May – Chandrashekarendra Saraswati, 68th Jagadguru of Kanchi Kamakoti Peetam (d.1994).
- 3 December – Deiva Zivarattinam, politician (d. 1975)

=== Full date unknown ===
- A.B. Purani, disciple and biographer of Sri Aurobindo (d.1965).
