= 1886 in India =

- Centuries: 17th; 18th; 19th; 20th; 21st
- Decades: 1860s; 1870s; 1880s; 1890s; 1900s
- See also: List of years in India; Timeline of Indian history

Events in the year 1886 in India.

== Incumbents ==
- Empress of India – Queen Victoria
- Viceroy of India – The Earl of Dufferin

== Events ==
- National income - ₹4,193 million
- Trinomali or Tiruvannamalai, a cheftian town, an ancient mart and the headquarters of the taluk of same name in South Arcot district in Madras Presidency was constituted as municipality. It was shifted to North Arcot district later. After independence, the city and few taluks of North Arcot district separated as new district with Trinomali as headquarters.
- Annexation of Burma

== Law ==
- Indian Tramways Act
- Births, Deaths and Marriages Registration Act
- Medical Act (British statute)

== Births ==
- 25 th may-great revolutionary Rash Behari Bose was born in village Subaldaha in 1886.
- 16 January – Chenganoor Raman Pillai, Kathakali artiste (d.1980).

== Deaths ==
- 16 August – Sri Ramakrishna (born 1836)
