= 1907 in India =

- Centuries: 18th; 19th; 20th; 21st
- Decades: 1880s; 1890s; 1900s; 1910s; 1920s
- See also: List of years in India; Timeline of Indian history

Events in the year 1907 in India.

== Incumbents ==
- Emperor of India – Edward VII
- Viceroy of India – Gilbert Elliot-Murray-Kynynmound, 4th Earl of Minto

== Events ==
- National income - ₹11,653 million
- 5 June – Bochasanwasi Shri Akshar Purushottam Swaminarayan Sanstha, a sect of Hinduism, is established by Swami Yagnapurushdas.
- 26 December – Surat Split of Congress- Split into Moderates and Radicals- Resulted in political void and arresting of Radical leaders
- Cochin State Forest Tramway started operation.

== Law ==
- Provincial Insolvency Act

== Births ==
- 1 January – Aftab Ali, Bengali politician and social reformer (died 1972 in the United Kingdom)
- 1 April – Sree Sree Shivakumara Swamiji, Head of Siddaganga Mutt and founder of Sree Siddaganga Education Society (died 2019)
- 15 May – Sukhdev Thapar, revolutionary, executed (died 1931).
- 19 August – Hazari Prasad Dwivedi, novelist, literary historian, essayist, critic and scholar (died 1979).
- 27 September – Bhagat Singh, freedom fighter, executed (died 1931).

=== Full date unknown ===
- Krishna Hutheesing, political activist and writer (died 1967).
