= 1910 in India =

- Centuries: 18th; 19th; 20th; 21st
- Decades: 1890s; 1900s; 1910s; 1920s; 1930s
- See also: List of years in India; Timeline of Indian history

Events in the year 1910 in India.

== Incumbents ==
- Emperor of India – Edward VII (until 6 May), then George V
- Viceroy of India – Gilbert Elliot-Murray-Kynynmound, 4th Earl of Minto
- Viceroy of India – Charles Hardinge, 1st Baron Hardinge of Penshurst (from 23 November)

== Events ==
- National income - ₹11,506 million
- 4 April – Sri Aurobindo began his spiritual pursuits in India

== Law ==
- Indian Museum Act
- Indian Electricity Act

== Births ==
- 30 January – Chidambaram Subramaniam, politician and Minister (died 2000).
- 10 February – Hafizur Rahman Wasif Dehlavi, Islamic scholar, jurist and literary critic. (died 1987)
- 17 February – Kothamangalam Seenu, Tamil actor and Carnatic music singer (died 2001).
- 19 May – Nathuram Godse, assassin of Mahatma Gandhi,(executed 1949).
- 19 August – Saint Alphonsa, Sister Alphonsa Muttathupadathu, in 2008 became first woman of Indian origin to be canonized as a saint (died 1946).
- 19 October – Subrahmanyan Chandrasekhar, astrophysicist and joint Nobel Prize in Physics winner (died 1995).
- 4 December – R. Venkataraman, politician and 8th President of India (died 2009).
- 11 December – Hari Singh Inspector General of Forests (died 2003)

=== Full date unknown ===
- Motilal, actor (died 1965).
