= 1884 in India =

- Centuries: 17th; 18th; 19th; 20th; 21st
- Decades: 1860s; 1870s; 1880s; 1890s; 1900s
- See also: List of years in India; Timeline of Indian history

Events in the year 1884 in India.

== Incumbents ==
- Empress of India – Queen Victoria
- Viceroy of India – George Robinson, 1st Marquess of Ripon
- Viceroy of India – The Earl of Dufferin (from 13 December)

== Events ==
- National income - ₹4,056 million
- The Webb case – District magistrate of Assam dismisses most charges against Charles Webb, who sexually assaulted and killed a female tea plantation worker; case galvanises public opinion against colonial rule

== Law ==
- Explosives Act
- Colonial Prisoners Removal Act (British statute)
- Naval Discipline Act (British statute)
- Criminal Lunatics Act (British statute)
- Indian Marine Service Act (British statute)

== Births ==
- 27 July - Sardar Bahadur Maharaj Jagat Singh Ji, Third Satguru of Radha Soami Satsang Beas (died 23 October 1951)
- March – Jagadguru Swami Sri Bharati Krishna Tirthaji Maharaja, Hindu teacher (d.1960).
- 21 September – Narendra Nath Dutta, physician (d.1949).
- 7 November – Pandurang Sadashiv Khankhoje, revolutionary, scholar, agricultural scientist and historian (d.1967).
- 22 November – Syed Sulaiman Nadvi, historian, biographer, littérateur and scholar of Islam (d.1953).

== Deaths ==
- 12 December – Charles Phillip Brown, writer and colonial official (b.1798).
