= 1909 in India =

- Centuries: 18th; 19th; 20th; 21st
- Decades: 1880s; 1890s; 1900s; 1910s; 1920s
- See also: List of years in India; Timeline of Indian history

Events in the year 1909 in India.

== Incumbents ==
- Emperor of India – Edward VII
- Viceroy of India – Gilbert Elliot-Murray-Kynynmound, 4th Earl of Minto

== Events ==
- National income - ₹11,094 million
- Adoption of schemes of reform
- Nasik conspiracy

== Law ==
- Morley-Minto reforms
- Presidency-Towns Insolvency Act
- Anand Marriage Act

== Births ==
- 1 January – Dattaram Hindlekar, cricketer (died 1949)
- 3 January – M. K. Thyagaraja Bhagavathar, actor and Carnatic singer (died 1959).
- 10 February – Pisharoth Rama Pisharoty, physicist and meteorologist (died 2002).
- 6 April – Alagappa Chettiar, businessman and philanthropist (died 1957).
- 16 July – Aruna Asaf Ali, independence fighter (died 1996).
- 19 July – Balamani Amma, poet (died 2004).
- 9 September – Leela Chitnis, actress (died 2003).
- 2 October – E. P. Poulose, politician (died 1983).
- 28 October – Kodavatiganti Kutumbarao, writer (died 1980).
- 20 December – Vakkom Majeed, freedom fighter and politician (died 2000).

=== Full date unknown ===
- V. K. Gokak, writer and scholar (died 1992).
