= 1887 in India =

- Centuries: 17th; 18th; 19th; 20th; 21st
- Decades: 1860s; 1870s; 1880s; 1890s; 1900s
- See also: List of years in India; Timeline of Indian history

Events in the year 1887 in India.

== Incumbents ==
- Empress of India – Queen Victoria
- Viceroy of India – The Earl of Dufferin

== Events ==
- National income - ₹4,525 million
- Trinity College London examiners conducted music examinations in Mumbai for the first time.
- India formed the Central Special Branch, now called the Intelligence Bureau (IB). It is India's equivalent to the US's Federal Bureau of Investigation (FBI). The Intelligence Bureau is said to be the oldest organization of its type.

== Law ==
- Provincial Small Cause Courts Act
- Suits Valuation Act
- Conversion Of India Stock Act (British statute)
- British Settlements Act (British statute)
- Superannuation Act (British statute)
- Appellate Jurisdiction Act (British statute)

== Births ==
- 26 February - Benegal Narsing Rau, Indian civil servant, jurist, diplomat and statesman (died 1953)
- 22 December – Srinivasa Ramanujan, mathematician (died 1920)
