= 1892 in India =

- Centuries: 17th; 18th; 19th; 20th; 21st
- Decades: 1870s; 1880s; 1890s; 1900s; 1910s
- See also: List of years in India; Timeline of Indian history

Events in the year 1892 in India.

== Incumbents ==
- Empress of India – Queen Victoria
- Viceroy of India – Henry Petty-Fitzmaurice, 5th Marquess of Lansdowne

== Events ==
- National income - ₹5,630 million

== Law ==
- Indian Councils Act 1892
- Colonial Probates Act (British statute)
- Foreign Marriage Act (British statute)
- Superannuation Act (British statute)

== Births ==
- 4 January – J. C. Kumarappa, economist (d.1960).

=== Full date unknown ===
- Fatma Begum, actress and India's first female film director (d.1983).
- Abdul Majid Daryabadi, Muslim writer and exegete of the Qur'an (d.1977).

== Deaths ==
- 28 October – Lal Behari Dey, journalist (b. 1824).
