= R. K. Trivedi =

Indian politician

Governor of Gujarat
- In office 26 February 1986 – 2 May 1990
- Preceded by: Braj Kumar Nehru
- Succeeded by: Mahipal Shastri

Chief Election Commissioner of India
- In office 18 June 1982 – 31 December 1985
- Preceded by: S. L. Shakdhar
- Succeeded by: R. V. S. Peri Sastri

Ram Krishna Trivedi (1 January 1921 – 19 November 2015) was an Indian Civil Servant who was Governor of Gujarat from 26 February 1986 to 2 May 1990. Mr. Trivedi also served as Chief Election Commissioner of India from 18 June 1982 to 31 December 1985. He was a recipient of the third highest Indian civilian honour of the Padma Bhushan.

R.K. Trivedi was born in Myingyan, Myanmar (Burma); studied at University of Yangon and University of Lucknow before joining the Indian Civil Service in 1943. He worked and served for over 36 years both with the Central Government and the state Government of Uttar Pradesh (UP).

He worked in the fields of planning and development, financial administration, education and personnel administration rising to the highest civil post of Secretary to Government of India in the department of Personnel and Administrative Reforms. He superannuated in 1979. He served in important districts of UP as District Magistrate and as Commissioner, Allahabad. He also headed the Medical, Finance, Power and Home departments in UP. He worked long in education in UP and thereafter as Vice Principal of the Lal Bahadur Shastri Academy for Indian civil servants at Mussoorie. He was also the Vice Chancellor of Bundelkhand University.

In the Central government of India, he worked in the departments of Civil supplies and Co operation and the Planning Commission of India and crafted India's 5th Five Year Plan.

He was the Vice President of the Indian Institute Of Public Administration and advisor at the Asian Centre for Development Administration (ESCAP-UN) at Kuala Lumpur.

He was the Central Vigilance Commissioner of India from 1980 till 1982 when he was appointed as India's Chief Election Commissioner, overseeing the world's largest elections including the 1984 General election to India's parliament.
