= R. V. S. Peri Sastri =

Indian election commissioner

Chief Election Commissioner of India
- In office 1 January 1986 – 25 November 1990
- Preceded by: R. K. Trivedi
- Succeeded by: V. S. Ramadevi

Rudrabatla Venkata Surya Peri Sastri was a former Chief Election Commissioner of India and served from 1 January 1986 until his death from cancer on 25 November 1990. The 1989 general elections were held during his tenure.

Born at Bhimilipatnam in Andhra Pradesh on 1 February 1929, Peri Sastri obtained a master's degree in English from the Madras Christian College under the University of Madras. Thereafter, he taught at Anantapur, Andhra Pradesh and Raipur, in erstwhile Madhya Pradesh, before enrolling for a BCL degree at the Faculty of Law, University of Delhi. He completed his BCL and L.LM from Delhi and also taught at the university. In 1956–57, he joined the Law Commission of India as a Junior Law Officer and moved thereafter to the Law Ministry, Government of India. He held various positions in the Law ministry, and rose to the post of Secretary to the Government of India in 1978. Peri Sastri was principal legislative draftsman of the Government of India for several years. He drafted several amendments to the Constitution of India and many epochal bills including the Road Corporations of India Act of 1950, The Sugar Development Fund Act, 1982 and Delhi Sales Tax Act, 1975.

During Peri Sastri's tenure as Chief Election Commissioner, the Government of India made the first effort to convert the commission into a multi-member body by appointing two election commissioners on the eve of the 1989 General election. This move was widely described as an attempt to curtail the powers of Peri Sastri, who refused to be browbeaten by the Government on the timing or conduct of the election, as described by former Comptroller and Auditor General C G Somiah in his book The Honest Always Stand Alone. During the tenure of Dinesh Goswami as Law Minister in the government of Vishwanath Pratap Singh, Peri Sastri recommended wide-ranging electoral reforms. The voting age was reduced to 18 during his tenure as Chief Election Commissioner. Also, the first steps towards use of Electronic Voting Machines were taken during his term.
