= 1885 in India =

- Centuries: 17th; 18th; 19th; 20th; 21st
- Decades: 1860s; 1870s; 1880s; 1890s; 1900s
- See also: List of years in India; Timeline of Indian history

Events in the year 1885 in India.

== Incumbents ==
- Empress of India – Queen Victoria
- Viceroy of India – The Earl of Dufferin

== Events ==
- National income – ₹ 3,991 million
- 24 June – Lord Randolph Churchill becomes Secretary of State for India.
- 28 December – 72 Indian lawyers, academics and journalists gather at Gokuldas Tejpal Sanskrit College in Bombay to form the Congress Party.
- First President of Indian National Congress – W. C. Banerjee; First Secretary of Indian National Congress – A. O. Hume; Dadabbhai Naoroji gave the name Indian National Congress

== Law ==
- Indian Telegraph Act
- Land Acquisition (Mines) Act
- East India Unclaimed Stock Act (British statute)
- East India Loan Act (British statute)
- Indian Army Pension Deficiency Act (British statute)
- Evidence By Commission Act (British statute)

== Births ==
- 14 February – Syed Zafarul Hasan, Muslim philosopher (died 1949).
