= 1904 in India =

- Centuries: 18th; 19th; 20th; 21st
- Decades: 1880s; 1890s; 1900s; 1910s; 1920s
- See also: List of years in India; Timeline of Indian history

Events in the year 1904 in India.

== Incumbents ==
- Emperor of India – Edward VII
- Viceroy of India – George Curzon, 1st Marquess Curzon of Kedleston

== Events ==
- National income - ₹8,840 million
- The gun carriage factory is established in Jabalpur
- 31 October – The Kumbakonam Bank Limited, is incorporated as a limited company (later known as the City Union Bank)
- The secret Abhinav Bharat Society is founded by extremist Vinayak Damodar Savarkar

== Law ==
- Raleigh Bill became Indian Universities Act
- 18 March, the Ancient Monuments Preservation Act is passed

== Births ==
- 28 March – V. Nagayya, actor, composer, director, producer, writer and playback singer (died 1973).
- 6 July – Zulfiqar Ali Bukhari, Pakistani broadcaster (died 1975)
- 29 July – J. R. D. Tata, French-born Indian aviator and businessman who became India's first licensed pilot (died 1993).
- 8 August – Tribhuvan Narain Singh, Chief Minister of Uttar Pradesh (died 1982).
- 26 August – C. R. Kesavan Vaidyar, social activist and industrialist (died 1999).
- 1 October – A. K. Gopalan, communist leader (died 1977).
- 2 October – Lal Bahadur Shastri, politician and 2nd Prime Minister of India (died 1966).
- 29 December – Kuvempu, poet, writer and playwright (died 1994).

=== Full date unknown ===
- Majnun Gorakhpuri, writer and literary critic (died 1988).
- Gorur Ramaswamy Iyengar, writer (died 1991).
- Murad, actor (died 1989).
