= 1896 in India =

- Centuries: 17th; 18th; 19th; 20th; 21st
- Decades: 1870s; 1880s; 1890s; 1900s; 1910s
- See also: List of years in India; Timeline of Indian history

Events in the year 1896 in India.

== Incumbents ==
- Empress of India – Queen Victoria
- Viceroy of India – Victor Bruce, 9th Earl of Elgin

== Events ==
- National income - ₹5,333 million
- 3 September - Nearly 13,176 members of Ezhava community led by Padmanabhan Palpu submits a petition for rights named Ezhava Memorial before Moolam Thirunal of Travancore.
- Bombay plague epidemic killed thousands
- A famine started in Bundelkhand and continued into 1897

== Laws ==
- Malabar Marriage Act, 1896

== Births ==
- 29 January – Acharya Srimat Swami Pranavanandaji Maharaj, founder - Bharat Sevashram Sangha (attained Samadhi on 8 January 1941)
- 29 February – Morarji Desai, independence activist and 6th Prime Minister of India (died 1995).
- 1 September – A. C. Bhaktivedanta Swami Prabhupada, founder-acharya of the International Society for Krishna Consciousness (died 1977).
- 27 October – Kshetresa Chandra Chattopadhyaya, scholar of Sanskrit (died 1974).

=== Full date unknown ===
- Firaq Gorakhpuri, poet (died 1982).

== Deaths ==
- 9 January – Dinkar Rao, statesman dies (born 1819)
