= 1912 in India =

- Centuries: 18th; 19th; 20th; 21st
- Decades: 1890s; 1900s; 1910s; 1920s; 1930s
- See also: List of years in India; Timeline of Indian history

Events in the year 1912 in India.

== Incumbents ==
- Emperor of India – George V
- Viceroy of India – Charles Hardinge, 1st Baron Hardinge of Penshurst

== Events ==
- National income - ₹12,869 million
- On February 14, George V gave a speech in the British Parliament about his visit to the imperial colonies and expressed his trust to India people and government he saw during his visit to India in 1911.
- On March 22, The State of Bihar is formed out of the erstwhile State of Bengal.
- On April 20, Baranagore Ramakrishna Mission Ashrama High School, a senior secondary boys' school was founded at Baranagar, Kolkata, West Bengal.
- On December 18–21, the India National (Missionary) Conference convened in Calcutta. One of its principal conclusions recognized the need for good Christian literature in India. To decide this question the Conference established a committee which by 1914 proposed three series of books aimed at embracing Christian principles.
- On December 29, India obtained its first Anglican bishop. Vedanayakam Samuel Azariah (1874–1945), the son of an Indian clergyman, educated at Madras Christian College, was consecrated as the First Indian Anglican bishop in St. Paul's Cathedral, Calcutta. There were present 11 British Anglican bishops, and the Governor of Bengal. In ten days Azariah took office in the newly created diocese of Dornakal.
- The construction of New Delhi was started. It was decided in 1911 when George V visited India during his travels to the British Empire colonies. The British Viceroy made Sir Edwin Lutyens responsible for the overall plan of Delhi and in 1912 he visited New Delhi to start his work. But the construction itself began only after World War I. Currently New Delhi is considered to be the crowning glory of the British Raj.
- Muslim Indian doctors and nurses were sent to join the Red Crescent organization to provide medical aid for Turkish troops in the Balkan war.
- Orissais carved out as a separate province from the British Raj.
- Sylhet is reconstituted into the non-regulation Chief Commissioner's Province of Assam (Northeast Frontier Province).
- The Government College of Technology, Rasul is established in the Punjab.

== Law ==
- June – the Government of India Bill is passed by which the seat of government is moved from Calcutta to Delhi and changes in the constitution of Bengal and Assam are made
- India introduced registration of motor vehicles.
- Wild Birds and Animals Protection Act
- Indian Lunacy Act

== Publications ==
- In March, Lala Har Dayal wrote an article for Modern Review entitled "Marx: A Modern Rishi", which is believed to be the first Indian article on Marx.
- Swadeshabhimani Ramakrishna Pillai wrote the biography of Karl Marx (1912) in Malayalam, which was the first Marx biography in any Indian language.

== Births ==
- 27 February – Lawrence Durrell, novelist, poet, dramatist and travel writer (died 1990 in France).
- 12 May – Mayavaram V. R. Govindaraja Pillai, Carnatic violinist (died 1979)
- 3 July – Hans Raj Khanna, Supreme Court Judge (died 2008).
- 10 September – B. D. Jatti, former Indian president(acting) (died 2002).
- 15 September – Russi Karanjia, journalist and editor (died 2008).
- 12 October – Muhammad Shamsul Huq, Bangladeshi academic and minister of foreign affairs (died 2006).
- 25 October – Madurai Mani Iyer, Carnatic music singer (died 1968).
- Abdul Hafeez or 'Hafeez Hoshiarpuri', Urdu poet born in Hoshiarpur, Punjab. (died 1973 in Karachi, Pakistan).
- Shankara Ram. M.Varadarajan, Tamil novelist. (died 1974).

== Deaths ==
- Hafeez Jaunpuri (real name Haafiz Muhammad Ali), poet, born in 1865 in Jaunpur.
- Rev. Thomas Walker, Indian chief spokesperson of Keswick Convention.
- Theodore L. Pennell, a medical missionary in India, born in 1867.
