= 1900 in India =

- Centuries: 17th; 18th; 19th; 20th; 21st
- Decades: 1880s; 1890s; 1900s; 1910s; 1920s
- See also: List of years in India; Timeline of Indian history

Events in the year 1900 in India.

== Incumbents ==
- Empress of India – Queen Victoria
- Viceroy of India – George Curzon, 1st Marquess Curzon of Kedleston

== Events ==
- National income - ₹7,080 million
- India's first participation in the summer Olympics
- 1 out of every 100 residents of India die of cholera each year.

== Law ==
- Prisoners Act

== Births ==
- 28 January – Rajagopala Tondaiman, King of Pudukkottai (died 1950).
- 12 July – Chhabi Biswas, actor (died 1962).
- 2 October – Mahendra Lal Wadhwa, freedom fighter (died 1988).
- 29 December – Deenanath Mangeshkar, actor, musician and singer (died 1942).

== Deaths ==
- Kavi Kalapi, poet (born 1874).
