= 1903 in India =

- Centuries: 18th; 19th; 20th; 21st
- Decades: 1880s; 1890s; 1900s; 1910s; 1920s
- See also: List of years in India; Timeline of Indian history

Events in the year 1903 in India.

== Incumbents ==
- Emperor of India – Edward VII
- Viceroy of India – George Curzon, 1st Marquess Curzon of Kedleston

== Events ==
- National income - ₹8,926 million
- 1 January – Edward VII is proclaimed Emperor of India.
- 20 March - Victoria Memorial Act passed for erection of Victoria Memorial, Kolkata.
- 15 May - Sree Narayana Dharma Paripalana Yogam, the socio-religious reformation organization of the Ezhava community in Kerala, South India established by the trio, Narayana Guru, Dr Padmanabhan Palpu, and Kumaran Asan.
- Plague (disease) breakout at Coimbatore.

== Law ==
- Works Of Defence Act
- Victoria Memorial Act

== Births ==
- 3 April – Kamaladevi Chattopadhyay, social reformer and freedom fighter (died 1988).
- Gopi Krishna, yogi, mystic, teacher, social reformer and writer (died 1984).
- June 25 - George Orwell, author, wrote Nineteen Eighty-Four, Animal Farm, and others (died 1950)

== Deaths ==
- 29 December - Baba Jaimal Singh, Founder of Radha Soami Satsang Beas (born 1839).
