= 1888 in India =

- Centuries: 17th; 18th; 19th; 20th; 21st
- Decades: 1860s; 1870s; 1880s; 1890s; 1900s
- See also: List of years in India; Timeline of Indian history

Events in the year 1888 in India.

== Incumbents ==
- Empress of India – Queen Victoria
- Viceroy of India – The Earl of Dufferin
- Viceroy of India – Henry Petty-Fitzmaurice, 5th Marquess of Lansdowne (from 10 December)

== Events ==
- National income - ₹4,773 million
- Mohandas Karamchand Gandhi left to study in London.
- Sree Narayana Guru, consecrated the first temple for the untouchables in Aruvippuram, Kerala, South India.

== Law ==
- Indian Reserve Forces Act

== Births ==
- 17 January – Babu Gulabrai, writer and historian (d.1963).
- 21 April - Charu Chandra Biswas,.
- 5 September – Sarvepalli Radhakrishnan, philosopher and statesman, first Vice President of India and second President of India (d.1975).
- 7 November – C. V. Raman, physicist, awarded the 1930 Nobel Prize in Physics (d.1970).
- 11 November – J. B. Kripalani, Freedom Fighter, Congress President (d. 1982).
- 11 November – Abul Kalam Azad, Freedom Fighter (d.1958).
- 16 December – Harold Papworth, British educator, college principal and Indian civil service officer (d. 1953)
- unknown date – Ahmad Saeed Dehlavi, freedom fighter and first general secretary of the Jamiat Ulama-e-Hind. (d. 1959).
