= Jayaraman =

- Gender: Male

Other names
- Alternative spelling: Jeyaraman
- Variant forms: Jayaram, Jayarama

Jayaraman is a South Indian male given name. Due to the South Indian tradition of using patronymic surnames it may also be a surname for males and females.

== Notable people ==
=== Last name ===
- C. S. Jayaraman (Chidambaram Sundaram Pillai Jayaraman), Indian actor, music director and playback singer
- D. K. Jayaraman (Damal Krishnaswamy Jayaraman), Indian musician
- Gayatri Jayaraman, Indian actress
- Lalgudi Jayaraman, Indian Carnatic violinist
- S. Jayaraman, Singapore Tamil writer
- S. P. Jayaraman, Indian politician
- V. Jayaraman, Indian politician
- V. R. Jayaraman, Indian politician
- Saru Jayaraman, American lawyer and activist

=== First name ===
- Jayaraman Gowrishankar, Indian medical microbiologist
