= 1890 in India =

- Centuries: 17th; 18th; 19th; 20th; 21st
- Decades: 1870s; 1880s; 1890s; 1900s; 1910s
- See also: List of years in India; Timeline of Indian history

Events in the year 1890 in India.

== Incumbents ==
- Empress of India – Queen Victoria
- Viceroy of India – Henry Petty-Fitzmaurice, 5th Marquess of Lansdowne

== Events ==
- National income - ₹5,190 million

== Law ==
- Charitable Endowments Act
- Revenue Recovery Act
- Guardians and Wards Act
- Prevention Of Cruelty To Animals Act
- Indian Railways Act

== Births ==
- A. R. Krishnashastry, writer, researcher and translator (died 1968).
