= 1931 in India =

- Centuries: 18th; 19th; 20th; 21st
- Decades: 1910s; 1920s; 1930s; 1940s; 1950s
- See also: List of years in India; Timeline of Indian history

Events in the year 1931 in India.

== Incumbents ==
- Emperor of India – George V
- Viceroy of India – The Lord Irwin
- Viceroy of India – The Earl of Willingdon (from 18 April)

== Events ==
- National income - ₹26,389 million
- 25 January – Mohandas Gandhi released again.
- January – The All-Asian Women's Conference (AAWC) takes place in Lahore.
- 13 February – New Delhi becomes the capital of India.
- 27 February – Chandrasekhar Azad martyrdom in an encounter with the British in Allahabad.
- 4 March – British viceroy of India and Mohandas Gandhi negotiate.
- 23 March – Independent India leaders Bhagat Singh, Rajguru and Sukhdev are hanged by the British Government.
- October, November – Mohandas Gandhi visits England.
- 4 November – Inauguration of the Thiruvananthapuram Central Railway station by the Maharaja of Travancore Sree Chithira Thirunal
- 6 November – Indian spiritual leader Meher Baba arrives in America for the first time.
- 2nd Round Table Conference
- Charka was adopted on centre of the flag by INC (Indian National Congress)

== Law ==
- 5 March – Gandhi Irwin Pact
- Bijni Succession Act
- Indian Tolls (Amendment) Act
- Provisional Collection of Taxes Act

== Births ==
- 4 January – Nirupa Roy, actress (died 2004).
- 28 January – S. Venkitaramanan, Governor of the Reserve Bank of India (died 2023).
- 3 February – Imtiaz Qureshi, chef (died 2024).
- 3 February – Charanjit Singh, hockey player (died 2022).
- 10 May – M. Chidananda Murthy, historian (died 2020).
- 16 May – K. Natwar Singh, politician and Minister.
- 27 May – O. N. V. Kurup, poet (died 2016).
- 20 June – Zia Mohyeddin, Pakistani actor and broadcaster (died 2023).
- 25 June – V. P. Singh, Prime Minister of India (died 2008).
- 17 July – B. V. Nimbkar, agricultural scientist and social worker (died 2021).
- 26 July – S. L. Bhyrappa, novelist.
- 27 August – Sri Chinmoy, spiritual teacher and philosopher (died 2007).
- 16 September – E. C. George Sudarshan, physicist, author and professor (died 2018).
- 26 September – Vijay Manjrekar, cricketer (died 1983)
- 12 October – Padma Desai, economist (died 2023)
- 15 October – A. P. J. Abdul Kalam, eleventh President of India.(died 2015)
- 21 October – Shammi Kapoor, actor (died 2011).
- 11 December - Rajneesh, spiritual guru.

=== Full date unknown ===
- Satyen Kappu, actor (died 2007).
- Romila Thapar, historian

== Deaths ==
- 23 March – Shivaram Rajguru, revolutionary, executed (born 1908).
- 23 March – Bhagat Singh, freedom fighter, executed (born 1907).
- 23 March – Sukhdev Thapar, revolutionary, executed (born 1907).
- 7 July – Dinesh Gupta, freedom fighter and revolutionary, executed (born 1911).
