= 1901 in India =

- Centuries: 18th; 19th; 20th; 21st
- Decades: 1880s; 1890s; 1900s; 1910s; 1920s
- See also: List of years in India; Timeline of Indian history

Events in the year 1901 in India.

== Incumbents ==
- Empress of India – Queen Victoria until 22 January
- Emperor of India – Edward VII from 22 January
- Viceroy of India – George Curzon, 1st Marquess Curzon of Kedleston

== Events ==
- National income - ₹7,666 million
- The first reliable census in India is taken.

== Law ==
- Indian Tolls (Army & Air Force) Act

== Births ==
- 15 April – Ajoy Mukherjee, politician, Chief Minister of West Bengal (died 1986)
- 2 July – Kalindi Charan Panigrahi, poet, novelist, story writer, dramatist and essayist (died 1991).

== Deaths ==
- 16 January – Mahadev Govind Ranade, judge, author and reformer (born 1842).
- 16 June – Sultan Shah Jahan, Begum of Bhopal (born 1838)
