= 1908 in India =

- Centuries: 18th; 19th; 20th; 21st
- Decades: 1880s; 1890s; 1900s; 1910s; 1920s
- See also: List of years in India; Timeline of Indian history

Events in the year 1908 in India.

== Incumbents ==
- Emperor of India – Edward VII
- Viceroy of India – Gilbert Elliot-Murray-Kynynmound, 4th Earl of Minto

== Events ==
- National income - ₹10,373 million
- March 17 – the Tinnevely riot breaks out in Tirunelveli
- May – the trial of the Alipore bomb case commences (and continues until 1909)
- September 28 – the Great Musi flood kills 15,000 people
- The Diwan-Ballubhai School is established in Ahmedabad
- Mohmand incursions which are joined by the Afghans

== Law ==
- Registration Act
- Indian Ports Act
- Limitation Act
- Code Of Civil Procedure
- Explosive Substances Act

== Births ==
=== January to June ===
- 17 January – L. V. Prasad, actor, producer and director (died 1994).
- 26 February – Leela Majumdar, writer (died 2007).
- 2 March – Mahadeva Subramania Mani, entomologist (died 2003).
- 5 April – Jagjivan Ram, freedom fighter and social reformer (died 1986).

=== July to December ===
- 6 July – Anton Muttukumaru, Ceylonese Army officer (died 2001)
- 24 August – Shivaram Rajguru, revolutionary, executed (died 1931).
- 30 October – Pasumpon U. Muthuramalingam Thevar, Indian Freedom Fighter, Orator, Politician (died 1963).
- 8 November – Raja Rao, novelist and short story writer (died 2006).
- 29 November – N. S. Krishnan, comedian, actor, playback singer and writer (died 1957).
- 15 December – Swami Ranganathananda, President of Ramakrishna Math (died 2005).
- 31 December – Isha Basant Joshi, civil servant and writer.

=== Full date unknown ===
- David Abraham Cheulkar, actor (died 1981).
- Sucheta Kriplani, freedom fighter, politician and in Uttar Pradesh became first woman to be elected Chief Minister of a state (died 1974).

== Deaths ==
- Kabibar Radhanath Ray, poet (born 1848).
- Mirza Ghulam Ahmad, Founder of Ahmadiyya Muslim Community (born 1835).
