= Om Prakash Kohli =

Indian politician (1935–2023)

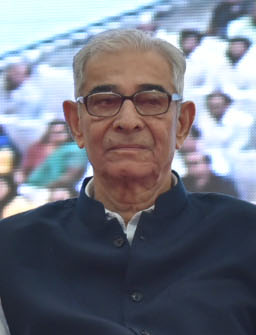
- Kohli in 2016

Governor of Gujarat
- In office 16 July 2014 – 21 July 2019
- Chief Minister: Anandiben Patel; Vijay Rupani
- Preceded by: Margaret Alva
- Succeeded by: Acharya Devvrat

Governor of Madhya Pradesh (Additional charge)
- In office 8 September 2016 – 19 January 2018
- Chief Minister: Shivraj Singh Chauhan
- Preceded by: Ram Naresh Yadav
- Succeeded by: Anandiben Patel

Governor of Maharashtra (Additional charge)
- In office 24 August 2014 – 30 August 2014
- Chief Minister: Prithviraj Chavan
- Preceded by: K. Sankaranarayanan
- Succeeded by: C. Vidyasagar Rao

Governor of Goa (Additional charge)
- In office 6 August 2014 – 25 August 2014
- Chief Minister: Manohar Parrikar
- Preceded by: Margaret Alva
- Succeeded by: Mridula Sinha

Personal details
- Born: 9 August 1935 Delhi, British India
- Died: 20 February 2023 (aged 87)
- Profession: Politician

Om Prakash Kohli (9 August 1935 – 20 February 2023) was an Indian politician who was the Governor of Gujarat from 2014 to 2019. He was the president of the Delhi unit of Bharatiya Janata Party from 1999 to 2000 and had served as a member of the Rajya Sabha from 1994 to 2000. He had been the president of the Delhi University Teachers' Association (DUTA) and of the ABVP. He studied at Ramjas School and Khalsa School, New Delhi. Kohli was a Master of Arts in Hindi from the University of Delhi and a lecturer at Hansraj College and Deshbandhu College for over 37 years. He was arrested under MISA during the Emergency.

From 8 September 2016 to 19 January 2018, he held the additional charge of the office of Governor of Madhya Pradesh along with Gujarat. He was also designated as the Chancellor of Gujarat Ayurved University, Jamnagar.

Kohli had a son (Vishu Kohli) and two daughters (Ritu Kohli and Suparna Khurana). He died on 20 February 2023, at the age of 87.

Political offices
Preceded by Margaret Alva; Additional Charge	Governor of Gujarat; 16 July 2014 – 20 July 2019	Succeeded by Acharya Devvrat
Preceded by Margaret Alva	Governor of Goa; Additional Charge; 6 August 2014 – 25 August 2014	Succeeded by Mridula Sinha
Preceded by K. Sankaranarayanan	Governor of Maharashtra; Additional Charge; 25 August 2014 – 30 August 2014	Succeeded by C. Vidyasagar Rao
Preceded by Ram Naresh Yadav	Governor of Madhya Pradesh; Additional Charge; 8 September 2016 – 23 January 2018	Succeeded by Anandiben Patel
