= 1891 in India =

- Centuries: 17th; 18th; 19th; 20th; 21st
- Decades: 1870s; 1880s; 1890s; 1900s; 1910s
- See also: List of years in India; Timeline of Indian history

Events in the year 1891 in India.

== Incumbents ==
- Empress of India – Queen Victoria
- Viceroy of India – Henry Petty-Fitzmaurice, 5th Marquess of Lansdowne
- The Queen of The Green River

== Events ==
- National income - ₹5,304 million
- 1 January - Malayali Memorial petition filed before king of Travancore.

== Births ==
- 14 April – B. R. Ambedkar, nationalist, jurist, Dalit political leader and a Buddhist revivalist (d.1956).

== Law ==
- Easements Act
- Bankers Books Evidence Act
- Mail Ships Act (British statute)
- Coinage Act (British statute)
