= Sarup Singh =

Indian academic and politician (1917–2003)

Governor of Kerala
- In office 12 February 1990 – 20 December 1990

Governor of Gujarat
- In office 21 December 1990 – 1 July 1995

Governor of Rajasthan (acting)
- In office 26 August 1991 – 4 February 1992

Personal details
- Born: 9 January 1917 Sanghi, Rohtak District, Haryana, British India
- Died: 4 August 2003 (aged 86)
- Occupation: Academic, Politician

Sarup Singh (also Swaroop Singh) (9 January 1917 – 4 August 2003) was an Indian academic turned politician. He remained a faculty member at Kirori Mal College, Delhi, and later became the Vice-Chancellor of the University of Delhi (1971–74). He was member of the Rajya Sabha from Haryana (1978–1984) of Lok Dal party. Earlier he was the Governor of Kerala, and later appointed Governor of Gujarat in December 1990 and held the position till 1995. He also served as acting Governor of Rajasthan from August 1991 till February 1992.

== Early life and education ==
Born in Sanghi Village, Rohtak district in Haryana, Singh studied till Class IV in his native village and completed his matriculation from Punjab University in 1934 and Intermediate Arts from Delhi University in 1936. He also did his B.A. (Hons.) in English from Ramjas College, Delhi (1938), followed by a M.A. in English in 1940.

== Career ==
Singh started his career as a lecturer at Hindu College, University of Delhi in 1940, where he taught for over a decade, in 1951 he joined University College London, and received his Ph.D. in English literature in 1953. Thereafter he rejoined Hindu College. However the following year, he was appointed Vice-Principal of Kirori Mal College, Delhi and later its Principal in 1957.

In 1961, when the Department of English was established at the University of Kurukshetra, he became its first Head. Then in 1965, he became Professor and Head of the Department of English in the University of Delhi. Eventually, he was appointed Vice-Chancellor of the university in January 1971.

He also remained member of Union Public Service Commission (1975–1978), and became a member of Rajya Sabha from Haryana (1978 - 1984).

He remained Governor of Kerala from 12 February 1990 to 20 November 1990.

After his death, 'Dr Sarup Singh Chair' was created at the Kurukshetra University, Haryana, while its Department of English also organized "Dr. Sarup Singh Lectures" on his birth anniversary, while the chair organizes seminars of Shakespeare in collaboration with the Shakespeare Association (India) starting 2006. The first "Dr. Sarup Singh Memorial Lecture" was held at University of Delhi in 2005.

== Works ==
- The Theory of Drama in the Restoration Period. Orient Longmans, Calcutta, 1963.
- Family Relationships in Shakespeare and the Restoration Comedy of Manners. Oxford University Press, New Delhi, 1983.
- The Double Standards in Shakespeare and Related Essays : Changing Status of Women in 16th and 17th Century England. Konark Publications, New Delhi, 1988.

== See also ==
- List of governors of Gujarat
- List of governors of Kerala
