= Beno Zephine =

Indian diplomat

Beno Zephine Azhagiri

Embassy of India, Jakarta

First Secretary (Commerce & Political)
- Incumbent
- Assumed office July 2025

High Commission of India, Kuala Lumpur

First Secretary (Information, Political & Policy Planning)
- In office July 2022 – July 2025

Ministry of External Affairs, India

Under Secretary (Policy Planning & Research division)
- In office June 2019 – July 2022

Personal details
- Born: 17 April 1990 (age 36) Chennai, Tamil Nadu, India
- Education: Little Flower Convent Higher Secondary School for the Blind; Stella Maris College, Chennai (2008–2011); Loyola College, Chennai (2011–2013)
- Occupation: Diplomat
- Awards: First Ladies Award (2018)

Beno Zephine Azhagiri (born 17 April 1990) is an Indian diplomat who has been serving as an Indian Foreign Service (IFS) Officer since 2014. She is the first 100% visually challenged officer in the history of the Indian foreign service.

== Early life and background ==
Beno Zephine Azhagiri was born on 17 April 1990 in Chennai, Tamil Nadu, India, to Luke Anthony Charles, an employee of Indian Railways, and Mary Padmaja, a homemaker. She completed her schooling at the Little Flower Convent Higher Secondary School for the Blind in Chennai. She went on to obtain her undergraduate degree in English literature from Stella Maris College, Chennai (2008–2011) and subsequently earned her postgraduate degree from Loyola College, Chennai (2011–2013).

To navigate structural accessibility barriers during her extensive academic and civil services preparations, she relied heavily on Job Access With Speech (JAWS), an assistive screen-reading software that enabled independent interactions with digital texts, alongside verbal reading support provided by her family. Prior to joining the diplomatic corps, she served briefly as a probationary officer at the State Bank of India.

== Career ==
Beno Zephine cleared the UPSC Civil Services Examination in 2013 with an All India Rank of 343. In June 2015, she was formally inducted into the Indian Foreign Service (IFS). To facilitate her assignment, the Central Government reviewed and amended specific visual parameter requirements that historically restricted entirely blind candidates from joining the diplomatic core. Following her training, she served her initial overseas assignment as a language trainee and Second Secretary at the Indian Embassy in Paris, France.

From June 2019 to July 2022, she was stationed at the Ministry of External Affairs (MEA) headquarters in New Delhi, operating as an Under Secretary in the Policy Planning & Research Division. She was subsequently deployed to the High Commission of India in Kuala Lumpur, Malaysia, where she served as the First Secretary managing the Information, Political, and Policy Planning portfolios from July 2022 to July 2025. In July 2025, she transitioned to the Embassy of India in Jakarta, Indonesia, assuming office as the First Secretary managing Commerce and Political affairs.

== Awards and recognition ==
- First Ladies Award (2018): In January 2018, she was honored by the President of India, Ram Nath Kovind, at the Rashtrapati Bhavan as one of 111 pioneering women recognized by the Ministry of Women and Child Development for breaking barriers as the first in their respective career fields.
- Biographical Documentary (2024): In mid-2024, the Don Bosco Image Media Centre (DBICA) released an educational short documentary titled Beno Zephine, directed by Ernest Rosario, chronicling her journey into the premier civil services to inspire school students across Tamil Nadu.
