= KRBL (company) =

Indian rice processing company

KRBL Limited
- Formerly: Khushi Ram Behari Lal Ltd.
- Type: Public
- Traded as: NSE: KRBL; BSE: 530813
- Industry: Rice
- Founded: 1889; 137 years ago in Lyallpur, Punjab, British India
- Founders: Khushi Ram; Behari Lal
- Headquarters: Noida, Uttar Pradesh, India
- Area served: Worldwide
- Key people: Anil Mittal (Chairman & Managing Director)
- Revenue: ▲₹5,363 crore (US$560 million) (FY23)
- Net income: ▲₹701 crore (US$73 million) (FY23)
- Website: krblrice.com

KRBL Limited is an Indian rice processing and exporting company, and the world's largest rice miller. It is best known for its India Gate brand of basmati rice, which is the largest selling rice brand in India. The company exports rice to over 80 countries; about 36% of its export revenue comes from the Middle East countries, as of 2021.

== History ==
KRBL was founded in 1889 in Lyallpur by two brothers–Khushi Ram and Behari Lal; the company name is an acronym of their names. Initially set up as a cotton-spinning (or perhaps cotton ginning) business, it also had business interests in edible oil, wheat and rice. After the partition of India, the family settled in Delhi and started again from scratch, working as trade agents of rice and oil in the city's Naya Bazaar area.

By the 1970s, KRBL was producing only rice, and supplying to local exporters including the Zee Group. The company began exporting rice directly, in its own name, only in 1985. In 1992, it set up its first unit in Ghaziabad, UP, on the outskirts of Delhi. This unit was for sorting, grading and packaging rice. In 1995, KRBL issued its initial public offering. In 1998, the company launched its own brand of rice, "India Gate," in the Indian market. In 1998, the company commissioned its second plant (sorting, grading, and packaging of rice) in Alipur, Delhi. In 2001, the third plant was set up in Gautam Buddh Nagar, UP (again in the outskirts of Delhi).

In 2003, KRBL became the first Indian rice company to receive foreign investment, and in 2006, it issued GDRs of US$13 million. It was also in 2003 that KRBL acquired a 65-acre rice processing, grading and packaging plant near Dhuri for ₹15.8 crore through a court auction. The facility was turned into the largest rice milling plant in the world after a ₹200 crore upgrade. In 2016, the company started operating its fourth plant, located in Sonipat district of Haryana.

== Controversy ==
The company was named in a chargesheet filed by the Enforcement Directorate (ED) in December 2020 in relation to a money laundering case linked with Embraer. In January 2021, the ED arrested KRBL's joint managing director Anoop Kumar Gupta in connection to the AgustaWestland bribery scandal.

== See also ==
- Pusa 1121 rice
