= Malati Bedekar =

Marathi writer

Malati Vishram Bedekar
- Born: 18 March 1905
- Died: 7 May 2001 (aged 96)
- Other names: Vibhavari Shirurkar, Balutai Khare
- Spouse: Vishram Bedekar
- Children: Shrikant Bedekar

Malati Vishram Bedekar (18 March 1905 – 7 May 2001) was a Marathi writer from Maharashtra, India. She was the first prominent feminist writer in Marathi literature. She also used pseudonym Vibhavari Shirurkar

== Biography ==
Balutai Khare was Bedekar's maiden name. She was the daughter of Anantrao and Indirabai Khare.

Anantrao was a progressive thinker and educator, and Indirabai was a capable woman who successfully managed a dairy business for 25 years. Balutai later wrote a semi-biographical novel Kharemasterafter her father.

In her teens, Balutai's parents sent her to stay in the hostel of the school for girls which Maharshi Dhondo Keshav Karve had started a few years earlier in Hingane, then in the outskirts of Pune. After finishing her education in that school, she graduated before her age 20 from the women's college which Karve had also started. At both of those institutions, progressive ideas of Karve and his teaching colleagues like Vaman Malhar Joshi highly influenced her thinking.

After college education, Balutai joined the teaching staff of Pune's Kanya Shala, which again was a girls' school being run under Karve's guidance. In 1936, she left that high school in the position of its headmistress to take up a government job as an administrator of a "settlement" for certain tribes identified as "criminal" tribes by the British government ruling over India at that time.

She met and married Vishram Bedekar in 1938, and took the name Malati Vishram Bedekar.

She left the government job in 1940 to take up writing, voluntary social services, and participation in socialist political activities.

She chaired a "parallel" Sahitya Sammelan (साहित्य सम्मेलन) which was held around 1980 in protest against excessive government meddling in the main Marathi Sahitya Sammelan (मराठी साहित्य सम्मेलन).

== Literary work ==
Bedekar wrote Kalyanche Nishwas (कळ्यांचे निःश्वास) --a collection of short stories—and Hindolyawar (हिंदोळ्यावर) --a novel—both in 1933 under the pen name Vibhavari Shirurkar (विभावरी शिरूरकर). In the two works, she discussed issues such as extramarital cohabitation, a woman's right to set up her own household alone, and dowry. The works were far too bold for the Indian society of the 1930s, and after their publication, there was a storm of outrage about them, they having been written by an unknown author under a pen name. (A few years later, before her marriage, Bedekar had revealed in a public speech that " 'Vibhavari Shirurkar' was me --Balutai Khare.")

In 1950, Bedekar wrote her effective novel Bali (बळी) (The Victim) as based on her observations for three years about the extremely harsh daily lives of the so-called "criminal " tribes confined to the "settlement" area behind barbed wires by the British government in pre-independence India. (By the time Bali got published, the government of independent India had abolished the same year, 1950, the concept of "settlement" area behind barbed wires for "criminal' tribes.)

While her novel Wiralele Swapna (विरलेले स्वप्न) contained a compilation of pages from the imaginary diaries of two lovers, her novel Shabari (शबरी) was the story of a woman trapped in a stifling marriage.

== Works ==
- Kalyanche Nishwas (कळ्यांचे निःश्वास) (1933)
- Hindolyawar (हिंदोळ्यावर) (1933)
- Bali (बळी) (1950)
- Wiralele Swapna (विरलेले स्वप्न)
- Kharemaster (खरेमास्तर) (1953).
- Shabari (शबरी) (1956)
- Paradh (पारध) (A play)
- Wahin Ali (वहिनी आली) (A play)
- Gharala Muklelya Striya (घराला मुकलेल्या स्त्रिया)
- Alankar Manjusha (अलंकार-मंजूषा)
- Hindu Wyawahar Dharma Shastra (हिंदुव्यवहार धर्मशास्त्र) (coauthored with K. N. Kelkar)
- Script of movie Sakharpuda (साखरपुडा)

A translation of Kharemaster (खरेमास्तर) was later published in English.
