= Acharya Devvrat =

Governor of Gujarat

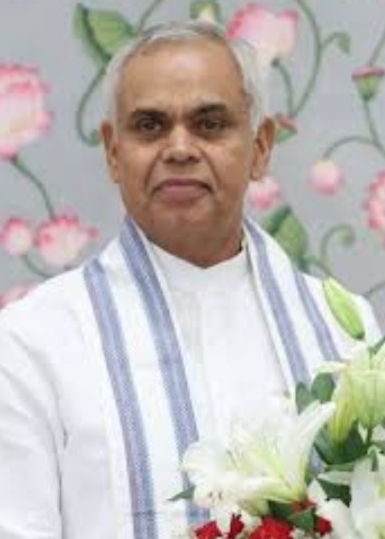
- Devvrat c. 2026

Governor of Gujarat
- Incumbent
- Assumed office 22 July 2019
- Appointed by: Ram Nath Kovind
- Chief Minister: Vijay Rupani (until 12 September 2021); Bhupendrabhai Patel (from 12 September 2021
- Preceded by: Om Prakash Kohli

Governor of Maharashtra (Note: Additional charge)
- In office 15 September 2025 – 10 March 2026
- Appointed by: Droupadi Murmu
- Chief Minister: Devendra Fadnavis
- Preceded by: C. P. Radhakrishnan
- Succeeded by: Jishnu Dev Varma

Governor of Himachal Pradesh
- In office 12 August 2015 – 22 July 2019
- Appointed by: Pranab Mukherjee
- Chief Minister: Virbhadra Singh; Jai Ram Thakur
- Preceded by: Kalyan Singh
- Succeeded by: Kalraj Mishra

12th Chancellor of Gujarat Vidyapith
- Incumbent
- Assumed office 20 October 2022
- Preceded by: Ela Bhatt

Personal details
- Born: 18 January 1959 (age 67) Samalkha, Punjab (present-day Haryana), India
- Party: Independent
- Spouse: Darsana Devi
- Occupation: Politician; educationalist

Acharya Devvrat (born 18 January 1959) is an Indian politician and former educator serving as the 19th Governor of Gujarat. He also served as the Governor of Maharashtra from 2025 to 2026. He is an Arya Samaj pracharak and served previously as the principal of a Gurukul in Kurukshetra, Haryana. Being the Governor of Gujarat, he is also the Chancellor of state universities of Gujarat.

== Personal life ==
Devvrat was born in Samalkha, then in East Punjab, now in Haryana. He is married to Darsana Devi.

== Governorships (2015 -Incumbent) ==
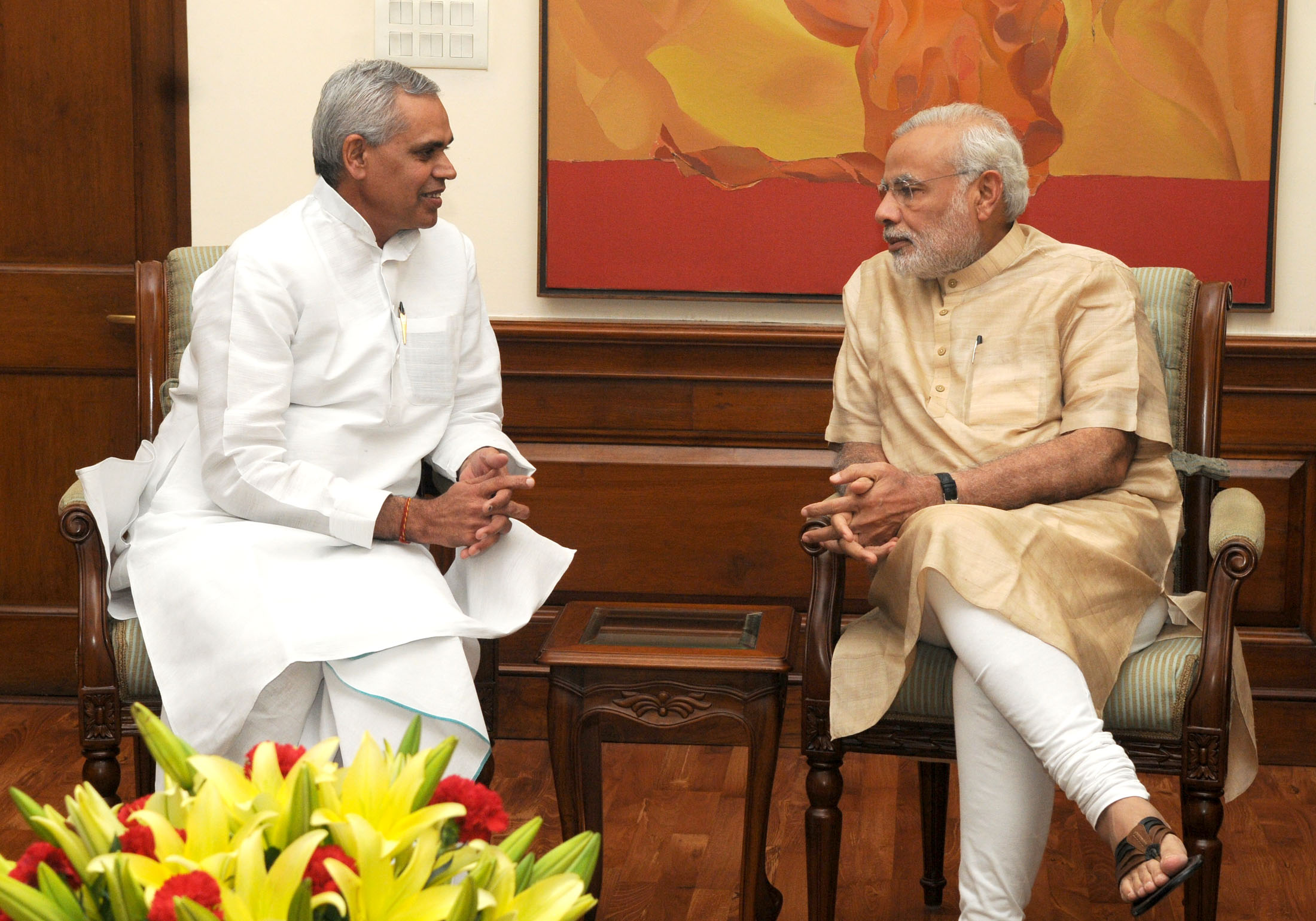

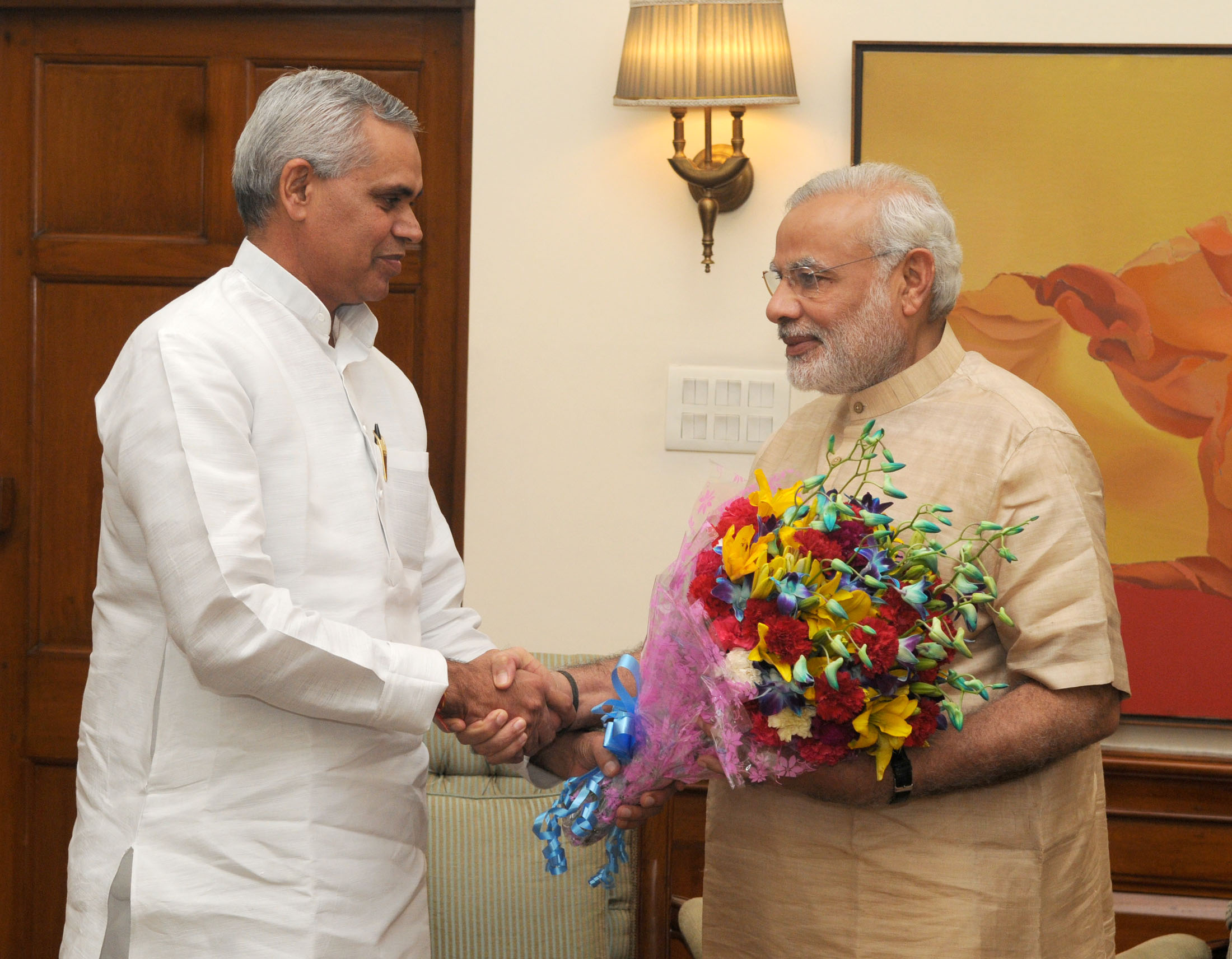
The Governor of Himachal Pradesh, Acharya Devvrat, met Prime Minister Narendra Modi on 22 August 2015.

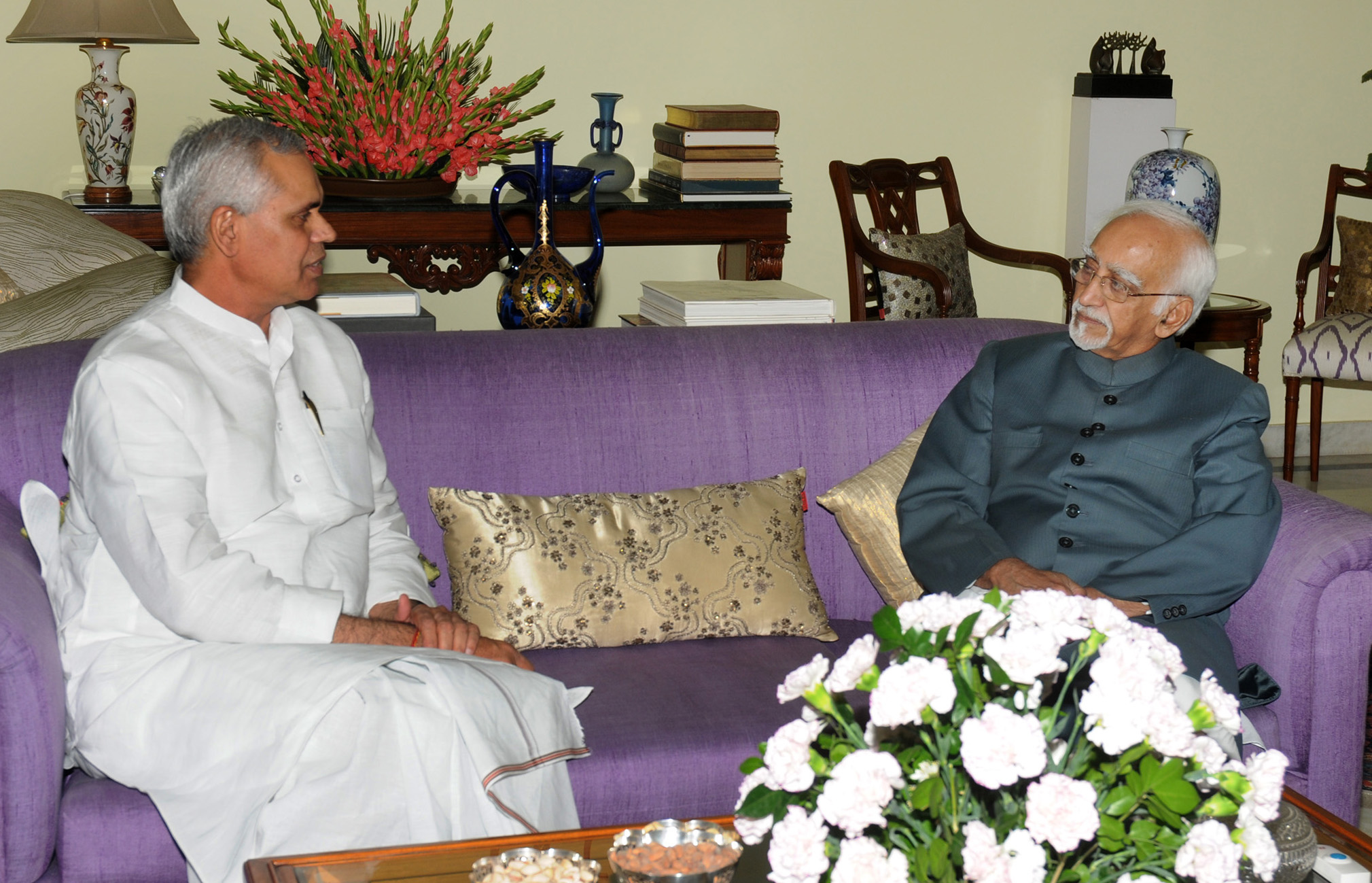
The Governor of Himachal Pradesh, Acharya Devvrat, called on Vice President M. Hamid Ansari on 24 August 2015.

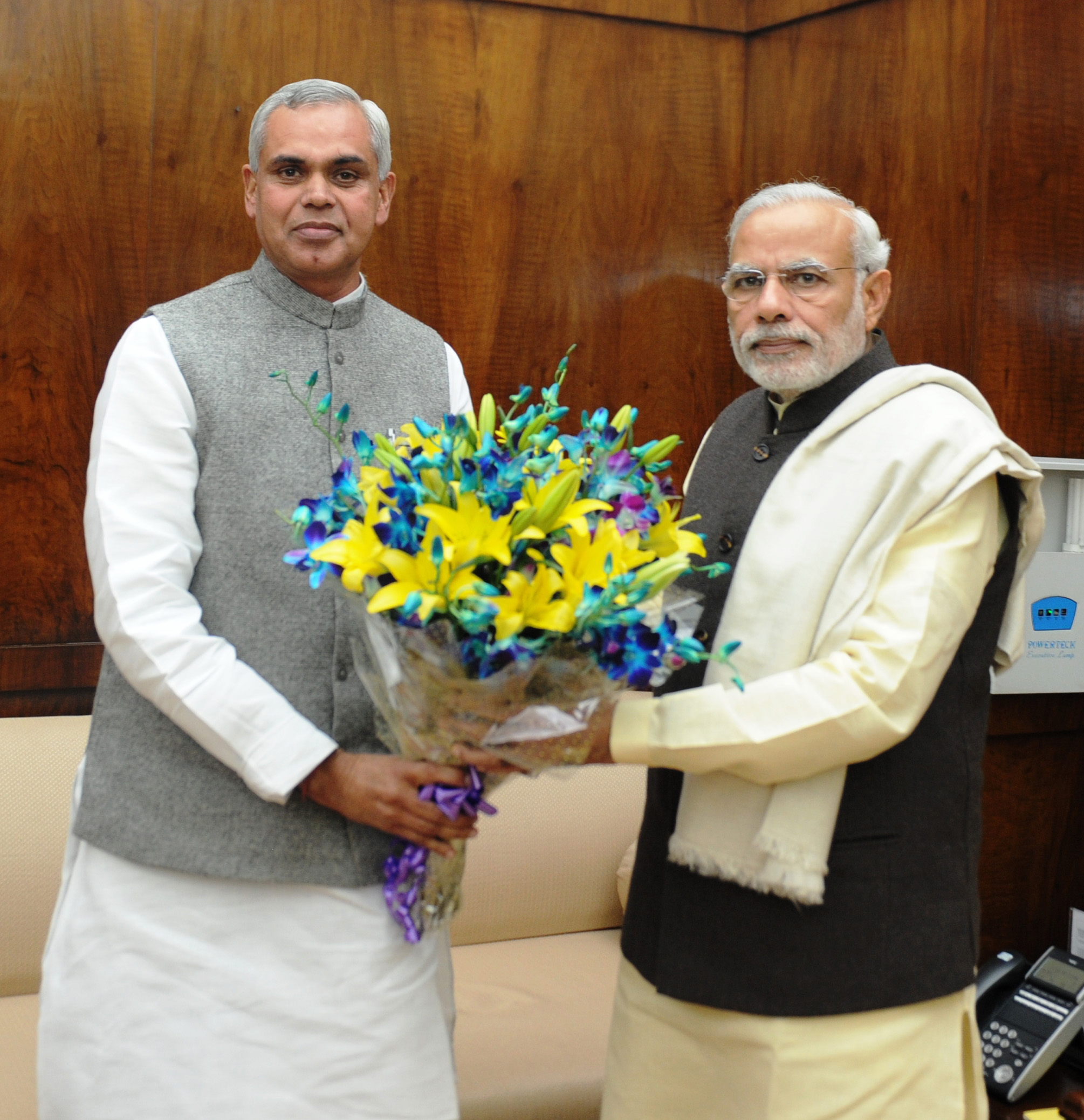
The Governor of Himachal Pradesh, Acharya Devvrat, met Prime Minister Narendra Modi on 11 December 2015.

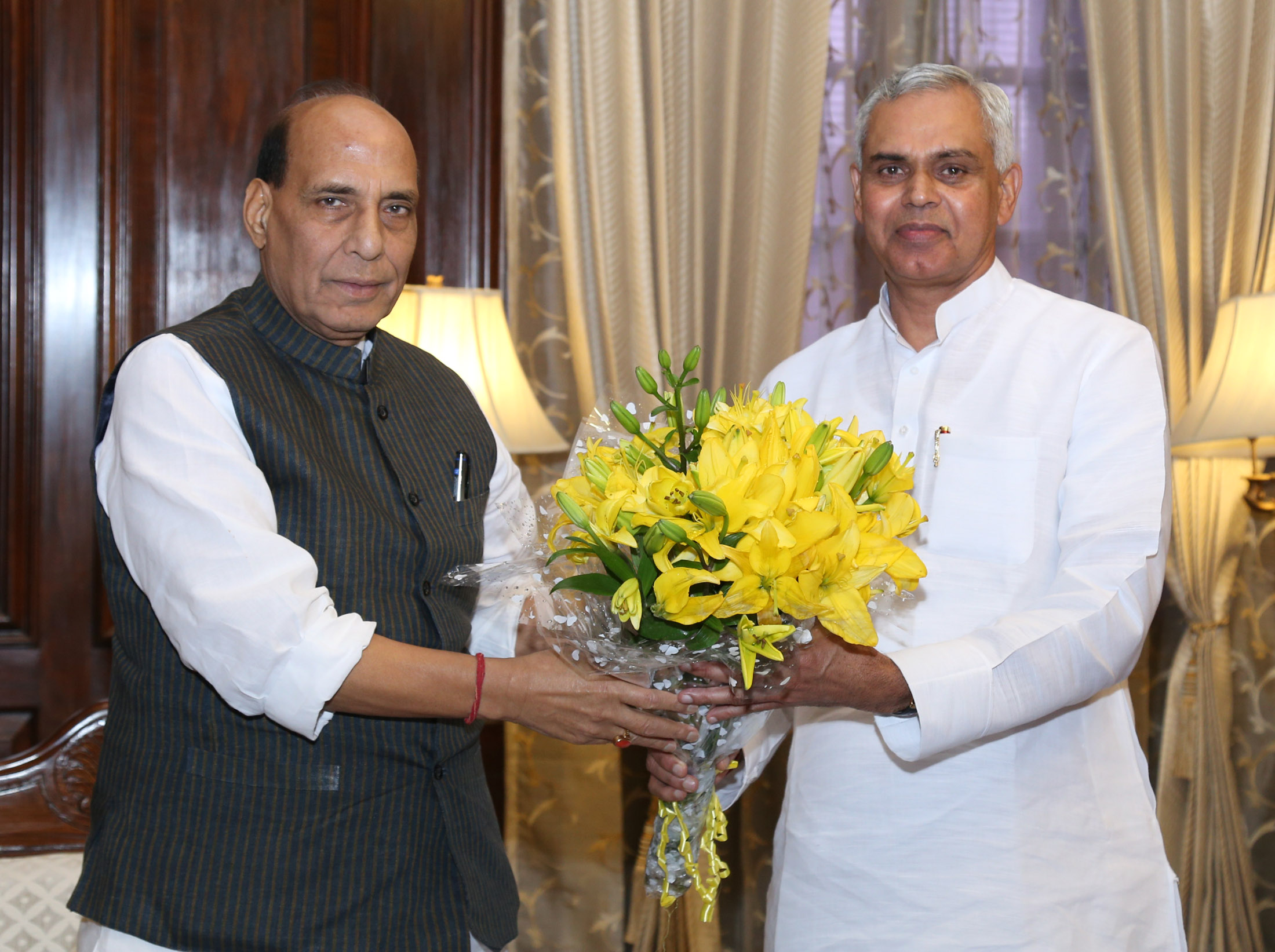
The Governor of Himachal Pradesh, Acharya Devvrat, calling on Home Minister Rajnath Singh on 29 July 2015.

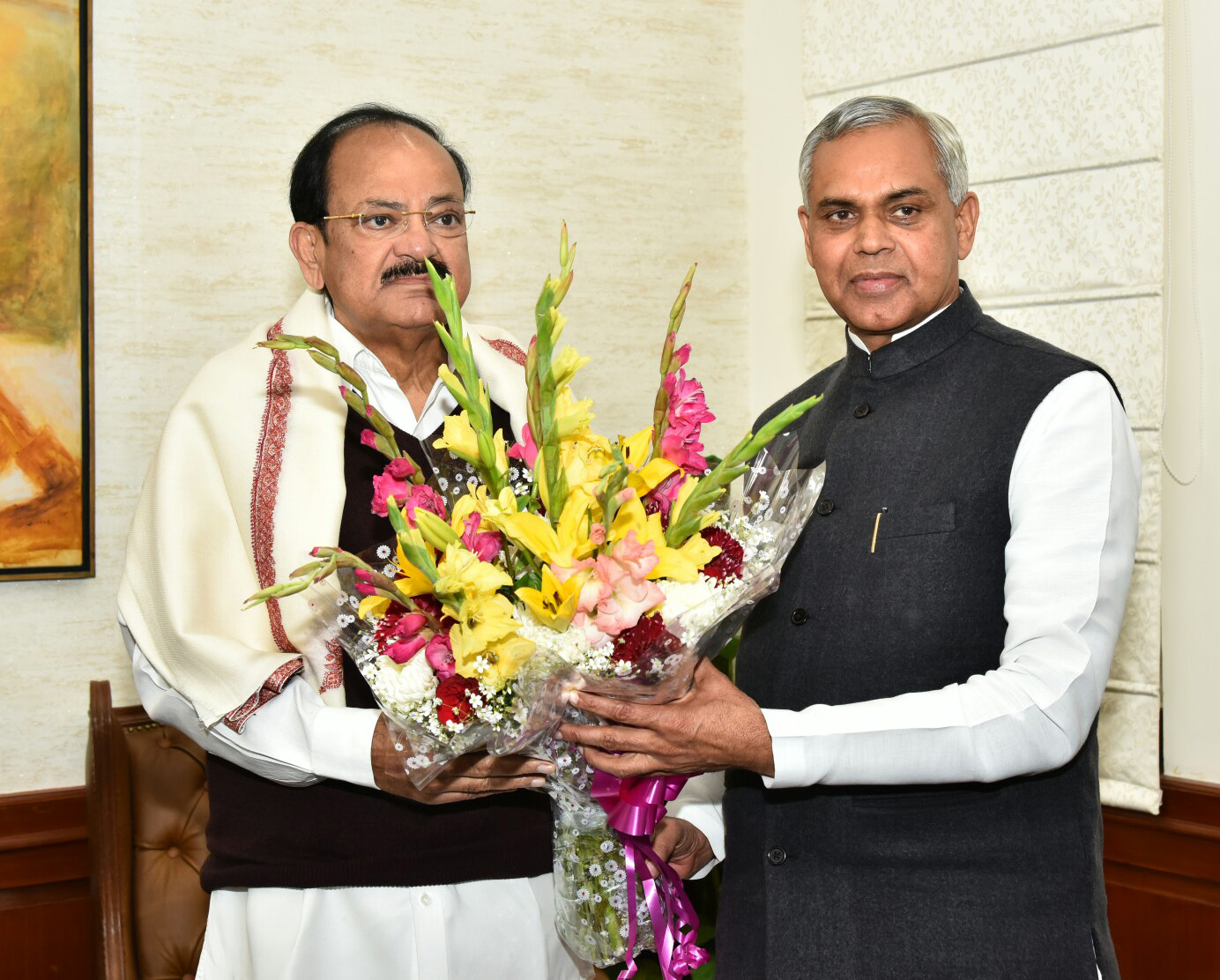

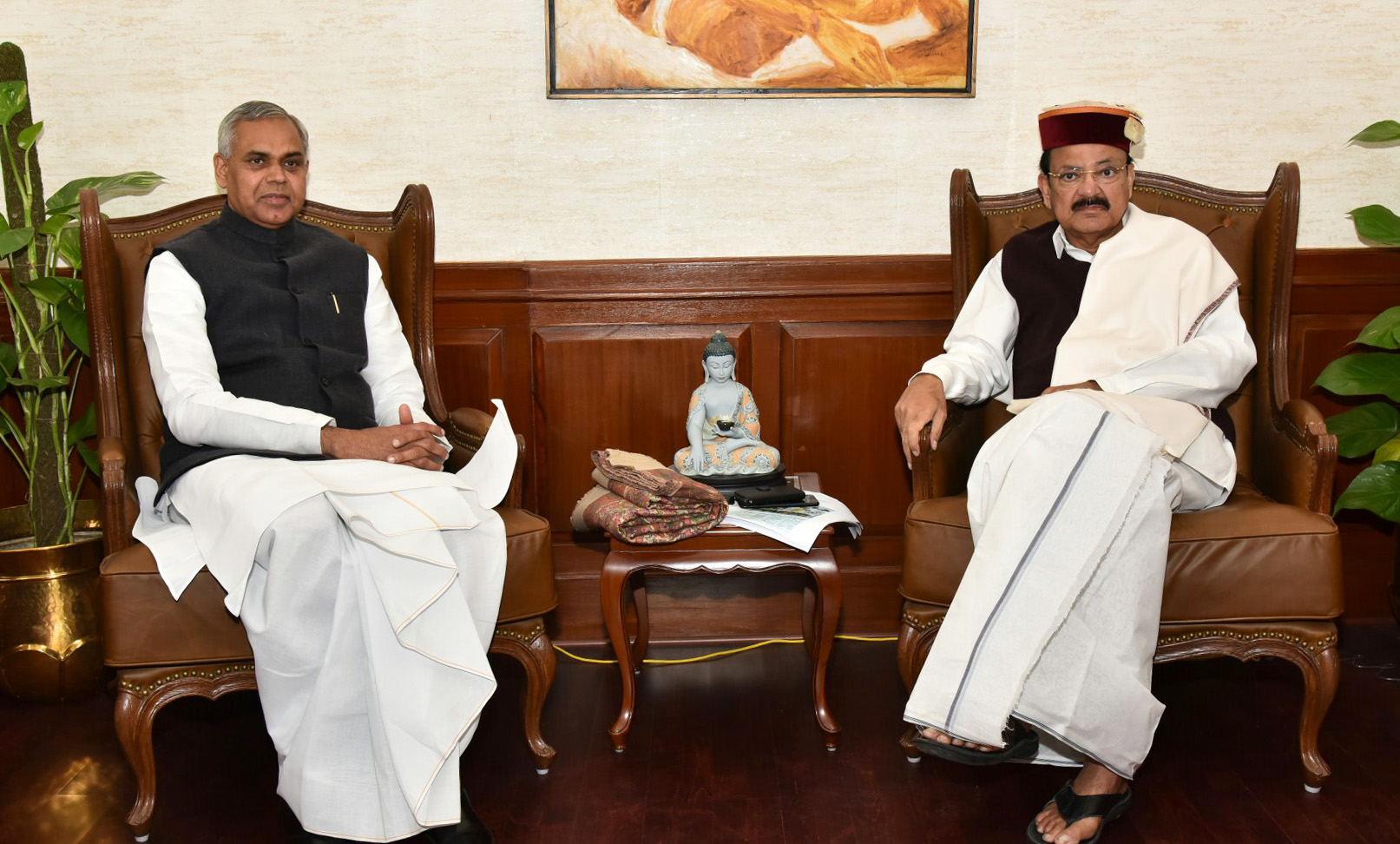
The Governor of Himachal Pradesh, Acharya Devvrat, calls on Vice President Venkaiah Naidu on 19 February 2018

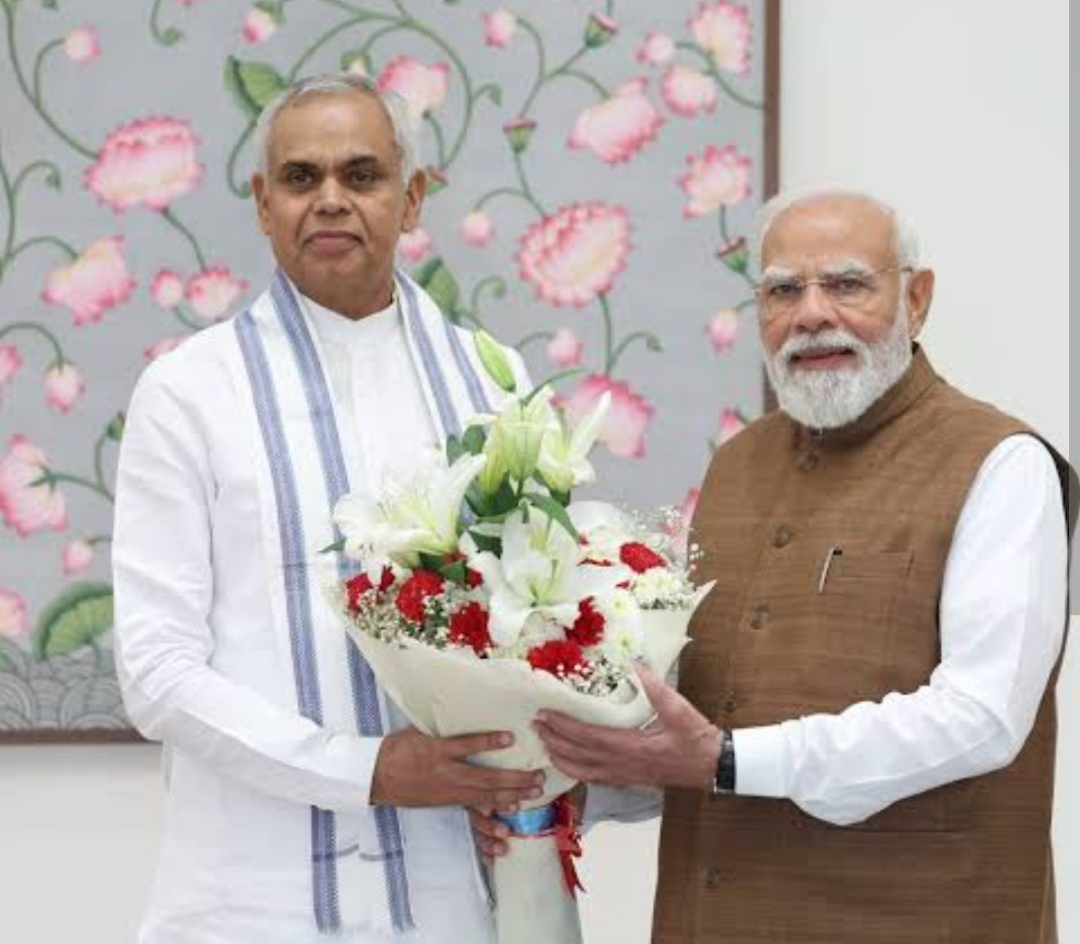
The Governor of Gujarat, Acharya Devvrat, called on Prime Minister Narendra Modi on 25 June 2026.

=== Governor of Himachal Pradesh (2015 - 2019) ===
In August 2015, Devvrat was appointed the Governor of Himachal Pradesh. He continued till 22 July 2019, when he was replaced by Kalraj Mishra.

=== Governor of Gujarat (2019 - Incumbent) ===
In July 2019, he was named as Governor of Gujarat, replacing Om Prakash Kohli.

=== Governor of Maharashtra (2025 - 2026) ===
In September 2025, Acharya took oath as the Governor of Maharashtra after being assigned the additional charge of the state. He served as the Governor of Maharashtra till 10 March 2026 when Jishnu Dev Varma was appointed.

== See also ==
- Hindu reform movements

Political offices
Preceded by Kalyan Singh; Additional Charge	Governor of Himachal Pradesh; 12 August 2015 – 21 July 2019	Succeeded by Kalraj Mishra
Preceded by Om Prakash Kohli	Governor of Gujarat; 21 July 2019 – Present	Incumbent
Preceded by C. P. Radhakrishnan	Governor of Maharashtra (Additional Charge); 15 September 2025 – 5 March 2026	Succeeded by Jishnu Dev Varma
