= Tinnevely riot of 1908 =

Riot in India

The Tinnevely riot was an outbreak of violence which occurred in the town of Tinnevely in then Madras Presidency of British India on 17 March 1908. The outbreak was in response to the arrest and subsequent conviction of Indian nationalists Swadeshi Padmanabha Iyengar, Subramania Siva and V. O. Chidambaram Pillai.

== Events ==
Swadeshi Padmanabha Iyengar, V.O. Chidambaram Pillai, and Subramania Siva were arrested in Tuticorin on 12 March 1908 for delivering inflammatory speeches. Following their arrest, a major riot broke out in the neighboring Tinnevely in protest. All the public buildings except the town office were attacked along with property destruction, although no casualties were reported from the rebellion. As a result, twenty-seven people were convicted for participation.
