= Abdul Ghani Saheb Saudagar =

Nawab Abdul Ghani Saheb
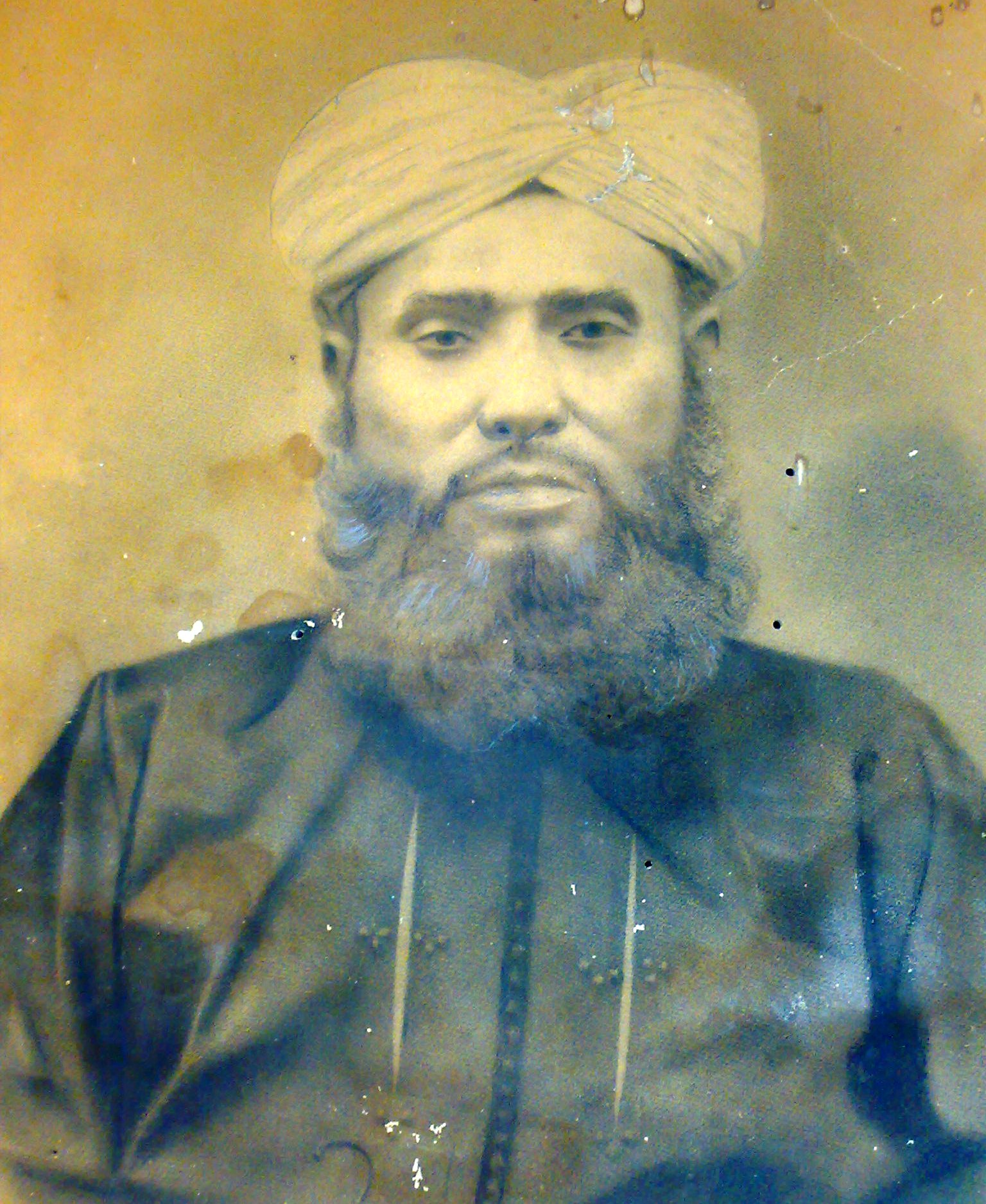
- Nawab Mohammed Abdul Ghani Saheb of Kholapur
- Born: 1843
- Died: 1897 (aged 53–54)
- Occupation: Businessman

Nawab Abdul Ghani Saheb (1843–1897) was a notable figure in the western Indian city of Kolhapur, located in the Bombay Presidency. He is described as having been a very enterprising trader and businessman, investing his time and wealth in developmental activities. In addition to his entrepreneurial life, Sahab engaged in services for both his community and his home country. Nawab Saheb was also involved with the establishment of educational opportunities for his fellow citizens, and in the year 1290 Hijri (1873 CE), he established a "dini madrasa" (an Islamic school, imparting education in Arabic, Islamic studies, Persian and history) that was subsequently named the Madrasa Nawabia Islamia.

Nawab Saheb was a prolific businessman and was eventually awarded a Certificate by the Resident State of Hyderabad on behalf of the British monarchy, then under the reign of Queen Victoria.

Three historic convocations (Ijlas-e-Dastarbandi) of the Madrasa took place.

- The first one was in the lifetime of Nawab Abdul Ghani, in the year 1311 Hijri (1893 CE).
- The second convocation was conducted by Nawab Mohammed Abdul Samad (died in 1942) the elder son of Nawab Mohammed Abdul Ghani Saheb.
- The third convocation took place under the reign of Nawab Mohammed Abdul Quader (died in 1943) the younger son of Nawab Abdul Ghani Saheb.

Over the years, the number of students in the resident Madrasa declined. In 1950, Shaikh-ul-Hadees Maulana Abid Ali Wajid Al-Husimi Bhopali rejuvenated and renamed the Madrasa as Madrasa Anwarul Uloom. To date the Madrasa is imparting education. His younger son, Nawab Mohammed Abdul Quader, carried on the developmental activities his father had started. Nawab Mohammed Abdul Ghani Sahab established a separate high school for girls. He also established a hospital and the post office (pin code: 444802). Each of these institutions has grown over time, and even today are the principal institutions of the region.

== Family ==
His elder son was Nawab Mohammed Abdul Samad, who was married to Halima Bi Sahiba, the sister of Nawab Nyazuddin Khan Bahadur (date of death uncertain), the Landlord of the Bhadrah Estate.

== Death ==
Nawab Mohammed Abdul Ghani Saheb died in 1898.
