= Phulmoni Dasi rape case =

1889 criminal case in India

The Phulmoni Dasi rape case was a case of child marriage and subsequent marital rape in India in 1889, which resulted in the death of the 10-year-old Hindu girl, Phulmoni Dasi. The case led to the conviction in 1890 of her 30-year-old husband Hari Mohan Maiti, and triggered several legal reforms.

Although the autopsy report clearly indicated an injured vagina as the cause of death, the husband was later acquitted of the rape charge because laws on rape excluded marital rape from the purview of criminal law.

== Events ==
Phulmoni Dasi was a ten-year-old Bengali girl with a 30-year-old husband named Hari Mohan Maiti. She died after her husband tried to consummate their marriage.

== Trial ==
The case went to trial in the Calcutta Sessions Court on 6 July 1890. The girl's mother provided testimony against the husband. The husband was convicted under Section 338 of the Indian Penal Code for "causing grievous hurt by act endangering life or personal safety of others". Under an exception clause in Section 375 of the Indian Penal Code, introduced in 1860, sex with one's own wife was not considered rape. As Phulmoni was of legal age and married to Maiti, he was sentenced to 12 months of hard labor. The case is known as Empress v. Hari Mohan Maiti.

== Reforms ==
On 9 January 1891, the Viceroy of India, Lord Lansdowne presented a bill before the Council of India, which was then headed by Andrew Scoble, called the "Age of Consent". It sought to amend Section 376 of the Indian Penal Code. Previously, the age of consent had been set at 10 in 1860. After the bill was passed on 29 March 1891, the Section 376 included sex with a girl under 12 even if the person is the wife of the perpetrator, as rape.
