= Rafiq Ahmed =

Rafiq Ahmad (1889–1982), commonly known as Comrade Rafiq Ahmad of Bhopal, was a communist activist of the 20th century in India.

Ahmed was a founder of the Communist Party of India (Tashkent group) in Tashkent in 1920 and travelled to Moscow to participate in the Russian civil wars and received the Lenin Award from the president of the Soviet Union.

Following Indian independence, Ahmed continued to live in Bhopal and later died in the same city. During this time, he limited his political activities.

Ahmed received the Tampatrr Award from Indian Prime Minister Indira Gandhi. Ahmed spoke Russian, Arabic, Hindi, English, and Urdu.
