= Alice Bloomfield =

Scottish gynaecological surgeon

- Born: 13 October 1895; British India
- Died: 5 January 1977 (aged 81); Hampshire, UK
- Occupations: gynaecologist barrister
- Awards: Fellow of the Royal College of Surgeons (1922); Fellow of the Royal College of Obstetricians and Gynaecologists (1935); Barrister-at-Law (1964)

Academic background
- Education: University of Edinburgh
- Thesis: Artificial pneumothorax in the treatment of pulmonary tuberculosis (1921)

Academic work
- Institutions: Royal College of Surgeons; Royal College of Obstetricians and Gynaecologists; Women's Medical Federation; Women's Visiting Gynaecological Club; Minister of Health's Medical Advisory Committee
- Notable works: Artificial pneumothorax in the treatment of pulmonary tuberculosis (1921)

Alice Bloomfield FRCS FRCOG (13 October 1895 – 5 January 1977) was a Scottish gynaecological surgeon and barrister. She was a Fellow of the Royal College of Obstetricians and Gynaecologists, recognised for her active involvement in the London medical community.

== Early life and education ==
Bloomfield was born on 13 October 1895 in British India to a merchant father. Following the murder of her father, Bloomfield, her mother and sister settled in Scotland.

Bloomfield was a medical student at the University of Edinburgh where she earned several academic accolades, including the Annandale Gold Medal for clinical surgery and the silver medal for systematic chemistry. In 1919, Bloomfield graduated from the University of Edinburgh with first class honours. She was later awarded the Leckie Mactier postgraduate scholarship and the William Gibson research fellowship. She completed her MD in 1921, became a Fellow of the Royal College of Surgeons in 1922 and completed a Master's in Surgery in 1929.

== Career ==
At the age of 28, after completing resident appointments at the Hospital for Women in Soho Square and Queen Charlotte's Hospital, Bloomfield became consultant surgeon in gynaecology at the South London Hospital for Women where she spent most of her career. She was also employed by the Marie Curie Hospital.

Bloomfield was active in the London medical community and was a founder member of the Royal College of Obstetricians and Gynaecologists (RCOG). In 1935, she was appointed as a fellow of the College at the behest of co-founder Sir William Fletcher Shaw. She served three terms on the RCOG Council: 1942-1944, 1946-1948 and 1951-1953, and later served as Chair of the Examining Board. Bloomfield was also a founder of the Women's Visiting Gynaecological Club, a member of the Women's Medical Federation, and participated in the 1942 Minister of Health's Medical Advisory Committee to advise on the development of Health Services in the United Kingdom.

Bloomfield presented several papers at the Royal Society of Medicine and wrote on subjects like abdominal surgery on the uterus, the effects of prolonged oestrogen administration, and male and female infertility.

Bloomfield was a part of many different research projects and help contribute to many medical discoveries. She helped author "The Development of The Lower End of The Vagina" in 1927. In this journal, Bloomfield works alongside J. Ernest Frazer to break down each part of the lower end of the vagina into 3 different main groups. Bloomfield made a name for herself in other medical journals and articles as well, some that were included in the "Section of Obstetrics in Gynaecology" are,

- Cyst Occupying the Utero-Vesical Space
- Case of Patient Wolffian Duct
- A Case of Primary Carcinoma of the Fallopian Tube

== Later life ==
Following her retirement from medicine, Bloomfield studied law. At the age of 70, she was called to the Bar from Gray's Inn and practised as a criminal barrister in the south western circuit. She was even taking classes to learn the language of Spanish in her final days of her life. Throughout her life, Bloomfield was known for being kind and gracious towards her patients, but was considered to be temperamental with her colleagues and other peer members.

On 5 January 1977, Bloomfield died in Hampshire aged 81. At the time of her death Bloomfield was living in the village of Dibden Purlieu, Hampshire.
