= List of governors of Gujarat =

Gujarat's heads of state

Governor of Gujarat
- Emblem of Gujarat

- Flag of India

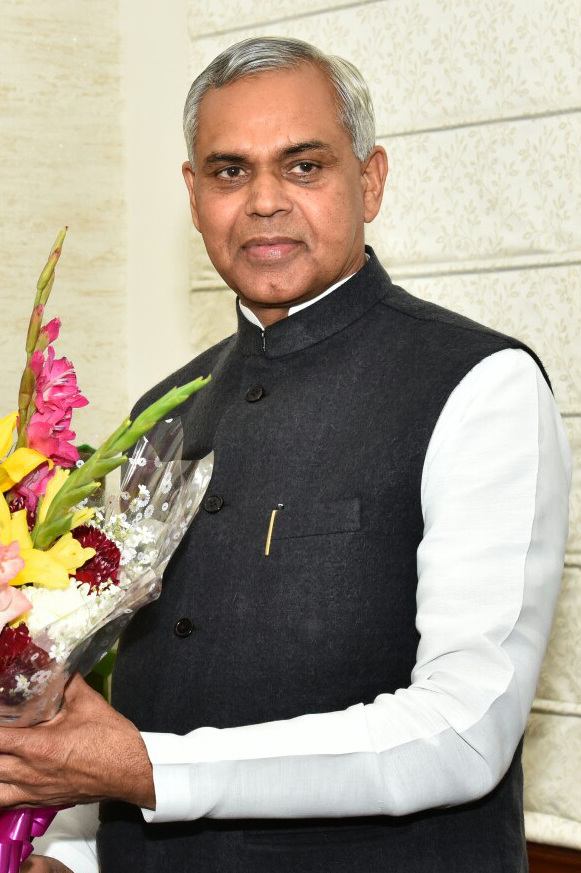
- Incumbent; Acharya Devvrat since 22 July 2019
- Style: His Excellency
- Residence: Lok Bhavan; Gandhinagar
- Appointer: President of India
- Term length: At the pleasure of the president
- Inaugural holder: Mehdi Nawaz Jung
- Formation: 1 May 1960; 66 years ago
- Website: https://rajbhavan.gujarat.gov.in

Gujarat is in western India.

The governor of Gujarat is the nominal head of the Indian state of Gujarat. The governor is appointed by the president of India and resides in Lok Bhavan in Gandhinagar. Acharya Devvrat took charge as the 27th governor on 22 July 2019.

== Powers and functions ==
The governor enjoys many different types of powers:

- Executive powers related to administration, appointments and removals,
- Legislative powers related to lawmaking and the state legislature, that is Vidhan Sabha or Vidhan Parishad, and
- Discretionary powers to be carried out according to the discretion of the governor.

=== Governors of Bombay State (1948–1960) ===
#	Portrait	Name (born – died)	Home state	Tenure in office			Appointer (President)
#	Portrait	Name (born – died)	Home state	From	To	Time in office	Appointer (President)
1		Raja Sir Maharaj Singh; CIE CStJ (1878–1959)	Punjab	6 January 1948	30 May 1952	4 years, 145 days	Lord Mountbatten (Governor-General)
2		Sir Girija Shankar Bajpai; KCSI KBE CIE ICS (1891–1954)	Uttar Pradesh	30 May 1952	5 December 1954^{[†]}	2 years, 189 days	Rajendra Prasad
–		Justice; M. C. Chagla (1900–1981); Chief Justice, Bombay High Court (Acting)	Bombay State	5 December 1954	2 March 1955	87 days	Rajendra Prasad
3		Harekrushna Mahatab (1899–1987)	Orissa	2 March 1955	14 October 1956^{[‡]}	1 year, 226 days	Rajendra Prasad
–		Justice; M. C. Chagla (1900–1981); Chief Justice, Bombay High Court (Acting)	Bombay State	14 October 1956	10 December 1956	57 days	Rajendra Prasad
4		Sri Prakasa (1890–1971)	Uttar Pradesh	10 December 1956	30 April 1960	3 years, 142 days	Rajendra Prasad

== List of governors ==
Legend

- ^{†} Died in office
- ^{§} Transferred
- ^{‡} Resigned/removed

Color key

- indicates acting/additional charge

#	Portrait	Name (born – died)	Home state	Tenure in office			Appointer (President)
#	Portrait	Name (born – died)	Home state	From	To	Time in office	Appointer (President)
1		Nawab; Mehdi Nawaz Jung (1894–1967)	Andhra Pradesh	1 May 1960	1 August 1965	5 years, 92 days	Rajendra Prasad
2		Nityanand Kanungo (1900–1988)	Orissa	1 August 1965	6 December 1967^{[§]} (Note: Transferred as the Governor of Bihar)	2 years, 127 days	Sarvepalli Radhakrishnan
3		Justice; P. N. Bhagwati (1921–2017) (Acting)	Gujarat	7 December 1967	26 December 1967	19 days	Zakir Husain
4		Shriman Narayan (1912–1974)	Madhya Pradesh	26 December 1967	17 March 1973	5 years, 81 days	Zakir Husain
5		Justice; P. N. Bhagwati (1921- 2017) (Acting)	Gujarat	17 March 1973	4 April 1973	18 days	V. V. Giri
6		K. K. Viswanathan (1914–1992)	Kerala	4 April 1973	13 August 1978	5 years, 131 days	V. V. Giri
7		Sharda Mukherjee (1919–2007)	Maharashtra	14 August 1978	6 August 1983	4 years, 357 days	Neelam Sanjiva Reddy
8		Professor; K. M. Chandy (1921–1998)	Kerala	6 August 1983	26 April 1984^{[§]} (Note: Transferred as the Governor of Madhya Pradesh)	264 days	Zail Singh
9		Braj Kumar Nehru; ICS (Retd) (1909–2001)	Uttar Pradesh	26 April 1984	26 February 1986	1 year, 306 days	Zail Singh
10		Ram Krishna Trivedi; ICS (Retd) (1921–2015)	Uttar Pradesh	26 February 1986	2 May 1990	4 years, 65 days	Zail Singh
11		Mahipal Shastri (1924–1994)	Uttar Pradesh	2 May 1990	20 December 1990^{[‡]}	232 days	Ramaswamy Venkataraman
12		Sarup Singh (1917–2003)	Haryana	21 December 1990	19 June 1993	2 years, 180 days	Ramaswamy Venkataraman
13		P. C. Alexander; IAS (Retd.) (1921–2011) (Acting)	Kerala	20 June 1993	20 July 1993	30 days	Shankar Dayal Sharma
14		Sarup Singh (1917–2003)	Haryana	21 July 1993	1 July 1995	1 year, 345 days	Shankar Dayal Sharma
15		Naresh Chandra; IAS (Retd) (1934–2017)	Rajasthan	1 July 1995	1 March 1996	244 days	Shankar Dayal Sharma
16		Krishna Pal Singh (1922–1999)	Madhya Pradesh	1 March 1996	24 April 1998	2 years, 54 days	Shankar Dayal Sharma
17		Justice (Retd); Anshuman Singh (1935–2021)	Uttar Pradesh	25 April 1998	16 January 1999^{[§]} (Note: Transferred as the Governor of Rajasthan)	266 days	K. R. Narayanan
18		Justice; K. G. Balakrishnan (born 1945) (Acting)	Kerala	16 January 1999	18 March 1999	61 days	K. R. Narayanan
19		Sunder Singh Bhandari (1921–2005)	Rajasthan	18 March 1999	7 May 2003	4 years, 50 days	K. R. Narayanan
20		Kailashpati Mishra (1923–2012)	Bihar	7 May 2003	12 July 2004^{[‡]}	1 year, 66 days	A. P. J. Abdul Kalam
21		Balram Jakhar (1923- 2016) (Additional Charge)	Punjab	12 July 2004	24 July 2004	12 days	A. P. J. Abdul Kalam
22		Nawal Kishore Sharma (1925–2012)	Rajasthan	24 July 2004	29 July 2009	5 years, 5 days	A. P. J. Abdul Kalam
23		S. C. Jamir (born 1931) (Additional Charge)	Nagaland	30 July 2009	26 November 2009	119 days	Pratibha Patil
24		Kamla Beniwal (1927–2024)	Rajasthan	27 November 2009	6 July 2014^{[§]} (Note: Transferred as the Governor of Mizoram)	4 years, 221 days	Pratibha Patil
25		Margaret Alva (born 1942) (Additional Charge)	Karnataka	7 July 2014	15 July 2014	8 days	Pranab Mukherjee
26		Om Prakash Kohli (1935–2023)	Delhi	16 July 2014	21 July 2019	5 years, 5 days	Pranab Mukherjee
27		Acharya Devvrat (born 1959)	Haryana	22 July 2019	Incumbent	7 years, 95 days	Ram Nath Kovind

== Oath ==
"Hu, [Name], Bhagwan na name sogand lau chu ke, hu pramanikta purvak [Name of State] na Governor tarike ni mhari duty bajaveesh (ke Governor na badha functions ne execute kareesh). Hu mhari poori ability thi Constitution ane Law ne preserve, protect, ane defend kareesh. Ane hu mhari jat ne [Name of State] na loko ni service ane emna well-being ma devote kareesh."
