= Sahana Devi =

Sahana Devi (Bengali: সাহানা দেবী) (1897–1990) was an Indian singer, she was a widely listened to singer of Rabindra Sangeet. She was the niece of Deshbandhu Chittaranjan Das.

== Career ==
She was born into an illustrious Bengali Brahmo family and had distinguished array of men and women in her paternal and maternal sides. Her paternal grandfather Kali Narayan Gupta, was a zamindar who became a Brahmo samaj leader, social reformer and a songwriter. Sir, K G Gupta, one of the top ranking Indian ICS was her father's elder brother. Her father Dr. Pyare Mohan Gupta was a district civil surgeon. Atul Prasad Sen was her father's sister's son. Her mother Tarala Devi was the elder sister of 'Deshbandhu' Chittaranjan Das. Sahaha took her music lessons from her maternal aunt Amala Das, a pioneer Rabindra Sangeet exponent and the first Indian woman to record songs in His Master's Voice. She was among the few singers to learn directly from Rabindranath Tagore and Dinendranath Tagore. In 1922, she met Dilipkumar Roy in the Gaya session of the Indian National Congress and was deeply influenced by his musical style, though she retained a distinct way of her own. Sick and deserted by her family, she was given refuge in 1927 by Tagore in his Santiniketan but she had to leave the place for her failing health.

Sahana Devi was one of two singers allowed by Rabindranath Tagore to improvise his songs.

== Personal life ==
Devi was the niece of Chittaranjan Das and a cousin of Atulprasad Sen.

In 1928, she joined the Aurobindo Ashram at Pondicherry where she lived until her death in 1990.

Devi wrote an autobiography in 1978 called 'Smritir Kheya' (Ferrying Down the memory stream)
