= Jayaram K. Udupa =

Jayaram K Udupa is an Indian-American imaging scientist and academic. He serves as a professor in the Department of Radiology at Perlman School of Medicine at the University of Pennsylvania. Udupa has worked in the fields of medical image science, image processing, and physics analysis of medical imaging and medical diagnostic procedures since the 1980s. He is known for his contributions in image processing and its applications in various fields of science, medicine, and engineering.

== Early life ==
Udupa received his bachelor's degree in Electronics and Communications at Mysore University in Mysore, India and his Ph.D. in Computer Science at the Indian Institute of Science in Bangalore, India.

== Career ==
From 1982 to 1991 he served as a member of the Medical Image Processing Group, Department of Radiology, University of Pennsylvania. From 1991 to 2016 he served as Director, Medical Imaging Image Processing Group, Department of Radiology, University of Pennsylvania.

=== 3D visualization technology ===
Udupa was the first to bring 3D visualization technology to medical imaging. He implemented an early version of the DISPLAY82 software on an Independent Physician Display Console (IPDC) of General Electric (GE) CT Scanners in 1979 and in 1980. This was the earliest attempt to bring to use 3D visualization via medical imaging scanner manufacturers. He played a major role in developing 3D82, 3D83, and 3D98 software, all designed to run on the GE IPDC. This had a major impact on medical 3D visualization.

In 1984, almost all scanner manufacturers and a few other independent vendors entered this field. Udupa assisted vendors in developing 3D visualization, including Technicare, Thomson CGR, Multiplanar Diagnostic Imaging and Virtual Imaging.

Udupa implemented an early version of DISPLAY82 at the Mayo Clinic Biodynamics Research Unit in 1980 and 1981. This effort triggered widespread use of 3D in Mayo for research and led to the development of ANALYZE, a package Mayo Clinic developed and commercialized.

He designed and directed the development of 3DVIEWNIX software, that is data, machine, and application independent, for the visualization and analysis of data.

=== Medical Image Processing Group ===
Medical Image Processing Group (MIPG) is one of the oldest research groups and studies the processing, visualization, and analysis of medical images, and the medical and clinical applications of these computerized methods. It was formed in the Department of Computer Science of the State University of New York, in 1976 by Gabor Herman T. Udupa joined the group in 1978. The group moved to University of Pennsylvania, its current home, in 1981. Udupa became its director in 1991.
