= Mahipal Shastri =

Indian politician

Mahipal Singh Shastri (Yadav)
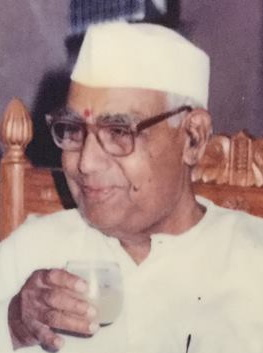
- Shastri at Gujarat Rajbhavan

Governor of Gujarat
- In office 2 May 1990 – 20 December 1990

Personal details
- Born: 19 January 1924 Makur, United Provinces of Agra and Oudh, British India
- Died: 23 August 1994 (aged 70) Lucknow, Uttar Pradesh, India
- Spouse: Mrs. Dhara Shastri
- Children: Ragini Singh, Meera Singh, Sanjay Singh, Dhananjai Singh

Mahipal Shastri or Mahipal Singh Shastri Yadav (19 January 1924 – 23 August 1994) was an Indian politician who served as Governor of the state of Gujarat during 1990. He died in Lucknow on 23 August 1994, at the age of 70.
