= Sahana Udupa =

Woman anthropologist on digital media

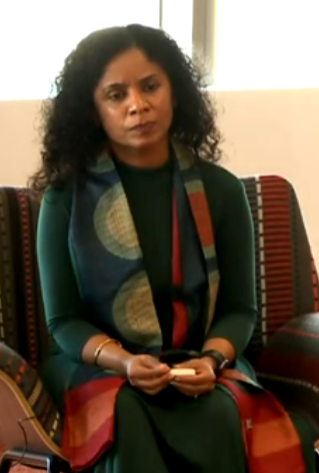
- Education: National Institute of Advanced Studies
- Occupations: Anthropologist, professor
- Employer: LMU Munich

Sahana Udupa is a media anthropologist and professor at LMU Munich in Germany, with a research focus on digital global cultures, AI assisted content moderation, online extreme speech, and digital media politics. She serves on several editorial and advisory boards and regularly takes part in popular media and policy debates around online abuse and disinformation.

== Career ==
Sahana Udupa received her Ph.D. from the National Institute of Advanced Studies in Bangalore and has been a visiting Ph.D. scholar at the Center for Global Communication Studies within the Annenberg School for Communication. She has been Research Fellow at the Max Planck Institute for the Study of Religious and Ethnic Diversity from 2011 to 2016, after which she joined the School of Public Policy at the Central European University as Associate Professor of Journalism and Media Studies. She is currently leading two research projects funded by the European Research Council, ONLINERPOL: ForDigitalDignity and AI4Dignity, at the Institute of Social and Cultural Anthropology at LMU Munich and is an advisory board member at the Social Science Research Council's initiative on digital disinformation research. Udupa has recently been named Joan Shorenstein Fellow at Harvard University.

== Awards ==
- 2022 Franqui Chair award by Franqui Foundation (Belgium)

== Publications (selection) ==
=== Books & edited volumes ===
- Udupa, S. (2015). Making News in Global India: Media, Publics, Politics. Cambridge: Cambridge University Press.
- Udupa, S. and McDowell, S. (2017). Media as Politics in South Asia. London and New York: Routledge, Taylor & Francis Group.
- Udupa, S., Gagliardone, I. and Hervik, P. (2021). Digital Hate: The Global Conjuncture of Extreme Speech. Indiana University Press.
- Udupa, S., Dattatreyan E. G. (2023). Digital Unsettling: Decoloniality and Dispossession in the Age of Social Media. New York University Press.

=== Papers ===
- Udupa, S. (2018). "Enterprise Hindutva and social media in urban India." Contemporary South Asia, 26(4), pp. 453–467.
- Udupa, S. (2018). "Gaali cultures: The politics of abusive exchange on social media." New Media & Society, 20(4), pp. 1506–1522.
- Udupa, S. (2019). "Nationalism in the Digital Age: Fun as a Metapractice of Extreme Speech." International Journal of Communication, 13, pp. 3143–3163.
- Udupa, S., Gagliardone, I., Deem, A. and Csuka, L. (2020). "Hate Speech, Information Disorder, and Conflict." Social Science Research Council.
- Udupa, S., Venkatraman, S. and Khan, A. (2020). "Millennial India: Global Digital Politics in Context." Television & New Media, 21(4), pp. 343–359
- Udupa, S., Maronikolakis, A. and Wisiorek, A. (2023) "Ethical scaling for content moderation: Extreme speech and the (in)significance of artificial intelligence." Big Data & Society, 10(1), pp. 1-15.

=== Interviews ===
- Scherf, M. and Udupa, S. (2018). "Mein Job ist es, die dunkle Seite zu beleuchten".
- Reuter, L. and Udupa, S. (2020). At the heart of data driven digital capitalism: Interview with Sahana Udupa from LMU Munich about extreme speech cultures online.
- Gödde, M. and Udupa, S. (2020). Extreme Speech on Social Media: Defending Dignity in a Digital World.
- Pentney, K. and Udupa, S. (2021). Episode 5: Moderating Global Voices.
- Grover, N. and Udupa, S. (2021). Q&A: Why cultural nuance matters in the fight against online extreme speech.
