= 1985 in India =

- Centuries: 18th; 19th; 20th; 21st
- Decades: 1960s; 1970s; 1980s; 1990s; 2000s
- See also: List of years in India; Timeline of Indian history

Events in the year 1985 in the Republic of India.

== Incumbents ==
- President of India – Zail Singh
- Prime Minister of India – Rajiv Gandhi
- Vice President of India – R. Venkataraman
- Chief Justice of India – Yeshwant Vishnu Chandrachud (until 11 July), Prafullachandra Natwarlal Bhagwati

=== Governors ===
- Andhra Pradesh – Shankar Dayal Sharma (until 26 November), Kumud Ben Joshi (starting 26 November)
- Assam – Bhishma Narain Singh
- Bihar – Akhlaqur Rahman Kidwai (until 15 March), P. Venkatasubbaiah (starting 15 March)
- Gujarat – Braj Kumar Nehru
- Haryana – Saiyid Muzaffar Husain Burney
- Himachal Pradesh – Hokishe Sema
- Jammu and Kashmir – Jagmohan Malhotra
- Karnataka – Ashoknath Banerji
- Kerala – P. Ramachandran
- Madhya Pradesh – K.M Chandy
- Maharashtra –
  - until 16 April: Idris Hasan Latif
  - 19 April-30 May: Pir Muhammad
  - starting 31 May: Kona Prabhakara Rao
- Manipur – K. V. Krishna Rao
- Meghalaya – Bhishma Narain Singh
- Nagaland – K. V. Krishna Rao
- Odisha – Bishambhar Nath Pande
- Punjab –
  - until 14 March: Kershasp Tehmurasp Satarawala
  - 14 March-14 November: Arjun Singh
  - 14 November-26 November: Hokishe Sema
  - starting 26 November: Shankar Dayal Sharma
- Rajasthan – Om Prakash Mehra (until 4 January), Vasantdada Patil (starting 20 November)
- Sikkim –
  - until 30 May: Kona Prabhakar Rao
  - 30 May-20 November: Bhishma Narain Singh
  - starting 20 November: T.V. Rajeswar
- Tamil Nadu – Sundar Lal Khurana
- Tripura – K. V. Krishna Rao
- Uttar Pradesh – Chandeshwar Prasad Narayan Singh (until 31 March), Mohammed Usman Arif (starting 31 March)
- West Bengal – Uma Shankar Dikshit

== Events ==
- National income - ₹2,845,341 million

=== January - June ===
- 16 January - Coomar Narain an employee of SLM Maneklal Industries and certain personal staff of Principal Secretary to the Prime Minister of India were arrested in connection with leaking of classified documents to foreign agents under Official Secrets Act (India). The person who caught coomair Narainan was Mr Ved Parkash Sharma, a CBI officer by chance. This is explained in a recently published book by Kalol Bhattacharjee in 2024.
- 4 February - M. G. Ramachandran returns after three months hospitalization and Kidney transplantation in Downstate Medical Center New York City.
- 18 February - Anti reservation protest in Gujarat turns into six month long 1985 Gujarat riots.
- 10 March - India won the first World Championship of Cricket held at Australia by defeating Pakistan in the final.
- 30 March - The Special Protection Group is created
- 10 April – Chakravarty Committee was set up by the RBI to review the working of monetary system. Its recommendations had far reaching consequences eventually removing India from the 500-year-old silver standard.
- 23 April - Shah Bano case verdict.
- 4–8 June - Merapani armed conflict between Assam and Nagaland.
- 5 June - R. Balakrishna Pillai, a minister from Kerala resigns following controversial speech (Punjab Model needed for Kerala) from him that encourage terrorism.
- 23 June – Air India Flight 182, a Boeing 747, blows up 31,000 feet (9,500 m) above the Atlantic Ocean, south of Ireland, killing all 329 aboard.

=== July - December ===
- 17 July - Karamchedu massacre of Dalits in Andhra Pradesh.
- 24 July - Rajiv–Longowal Accord
- 15 August - Assam Accord signed between Government of India and Assam agitators.
- 26 September – 1985 Punjab Legislative Assembly election.

=== Dates unknown ===
- By mid-1985, the statutory preemption on banks' resources in the form of the Statutory Liquidity Ratio and the Cash Reserve Ratio exceeded 45%.
- Texas Instruments, a multinational corporation, starts its India operations in Bangalore and helps create infrastructure to export software via satellite communications from India for the first time.
- Narmada Bachao Andolan started by Medha Patkar

== Law ==
- 24 May - Terrorist and Disruptive Activities (Prevention) Act is came into effect after presidential assent.
- 2 September - Indira Gandhi National Open University is established by an Act of Indian Parliament.
- 14 November - The Narcotic Drugs and Psychotropic Substances Act is passed by Parliament came into force.
- The Administrative tribunals in Delhi, Mumbai, Calcutta and Allahabad were established by Administrative Tribunals Act, 1985.

== Births ==
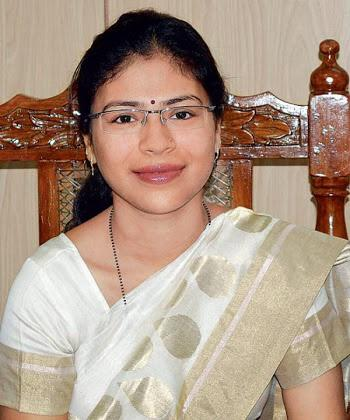
Durga Shakti Nagpal

- 16 January - Sidharth Malhotra, actor and former model
- 13 February – Somdev Devvarman, tennis player
- 17 February – Sivakarthikeyan, actor, producer, lyricist, TV anchor.
- 22 February – Bombayla Devi Laishram, archer.
- 5 March – Varalaxmi Sarathkumar, actress
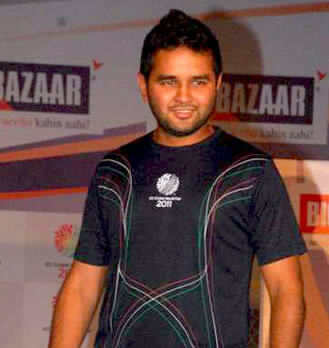
- Parthiv Patel
  9 March - Parthiv Patel, cricketer
- 26 March – Kedar Jadhav, Cricketer.
- 27 March – Ram Charan, actor and producer.
- 6 April – Jai, actor.
- 23 April – Annies Kanmani Joy, IAS.
- 9 May – Neha Bamb, actress.
- 15 May – Tathagata Mukherjee, actor.
- 17 May – Nushrratt Bharuccha, actress
- 30 May – Jennifer Winget, Actress.
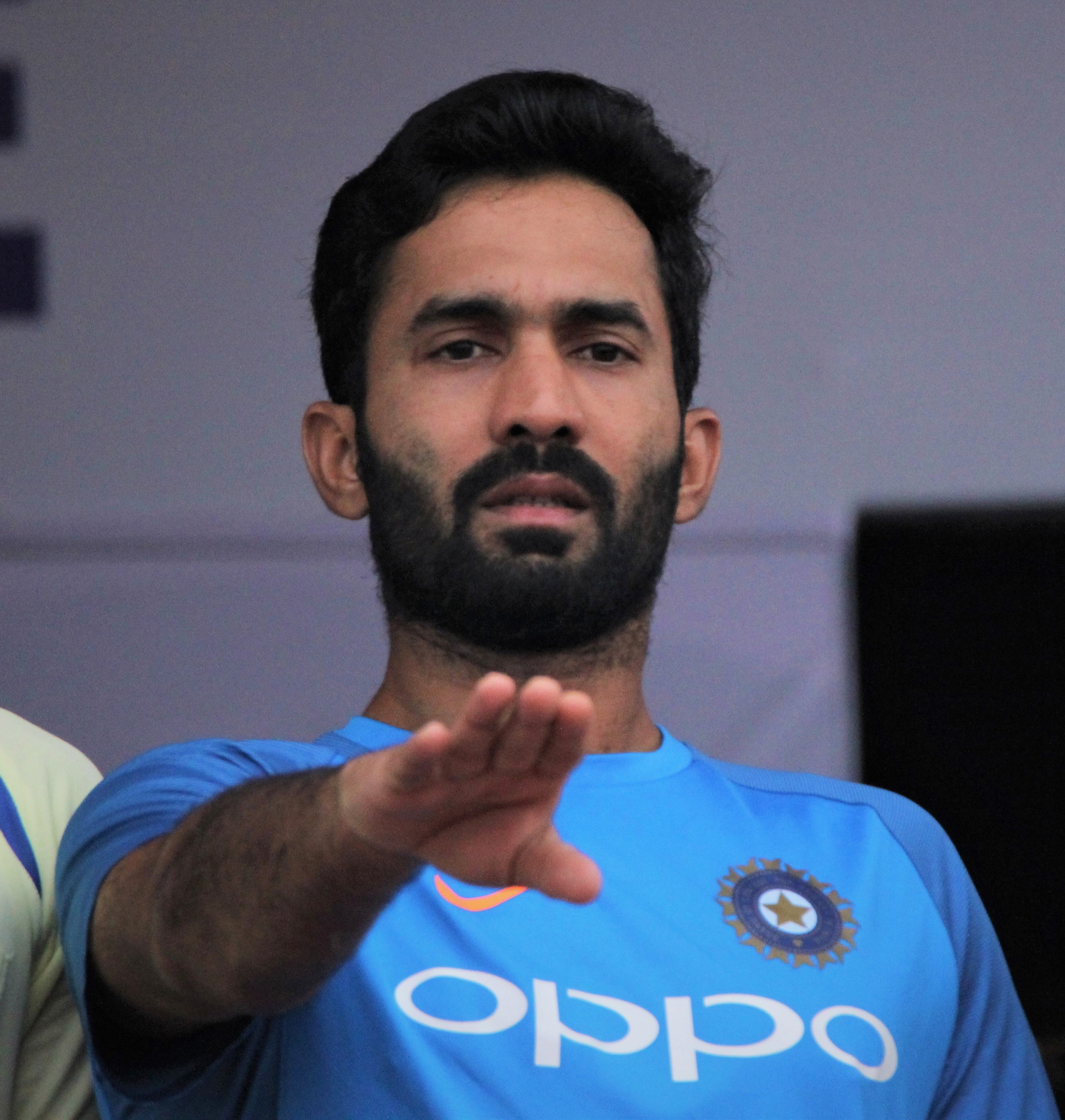
- Dinesh Karthik
  1 June – Dinesh Karthik, cricketer.
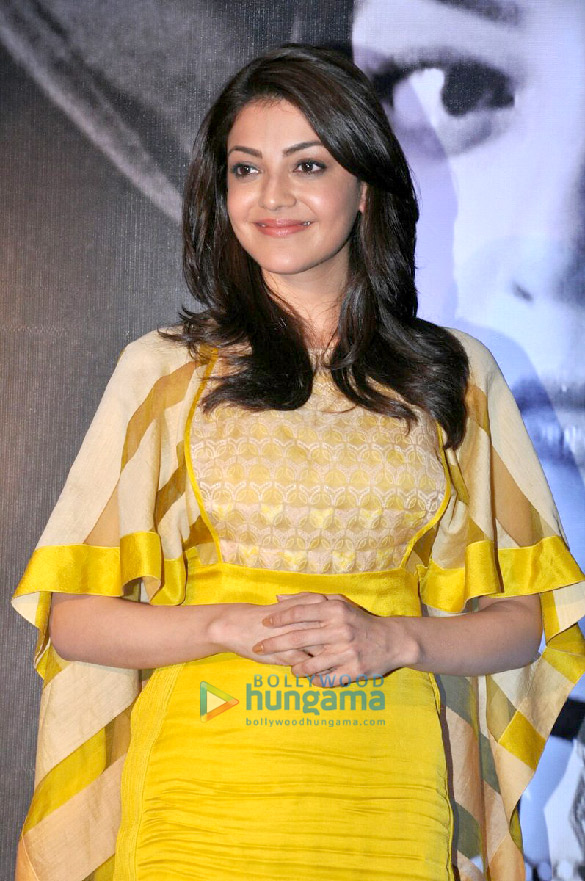
- Kajal Aggarwal
- 9 June – Sonam Kapoor, actress.
- 19 June – Kajal Aggarwal, actress.
- 20 June – RJ Balaji, radio jockey, actor, television presenter, comedian and film director.
- 25 June – Durga Shakti Nagpal, Indian bureaucrat.
- 26 June – Arjun Kapoor, Indian actor
- 1 July – Mohammed Irfan, singer
- 6 July – Ranveer Singh, actor
- 22 July – Yogi Babu, actor and comedian.
- 7 September – Radhika Apte, actress.
- 18 September – Vignesh Shivan, film director, lyricist and producer.
- 23 September – Ambati Rayudu, cricketer.
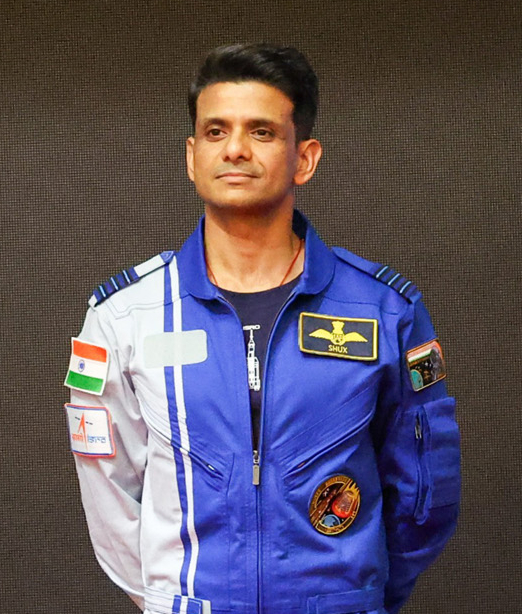
- Shubhanshu Shukla
  10 October - Shubhanshu Shukla, ISRO astronaut and Indian Air Force test pilot.
- 18 October - Sourabhee Debbarma, singer.
- 26 October – Asin Thottumkal, actress.
- 29 October – Vijender Singh, boxer
- 1 November – Anand Ambani, Business Magnet.
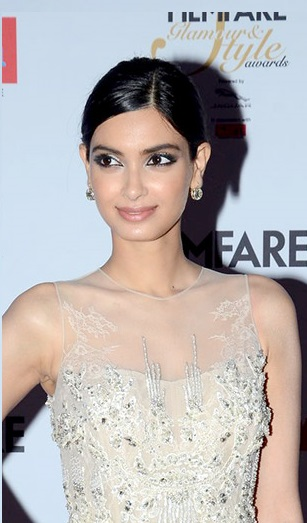
- Diana Penty
  2 November – Diana Penty, actress.
- 11 November – Robin Uthappa, cricketer.
- 16 November – Aditya Roy Kapur, actor
- 19 November – Shweta Mohan, singer
- 28 November – Esha Gupta, actress and model
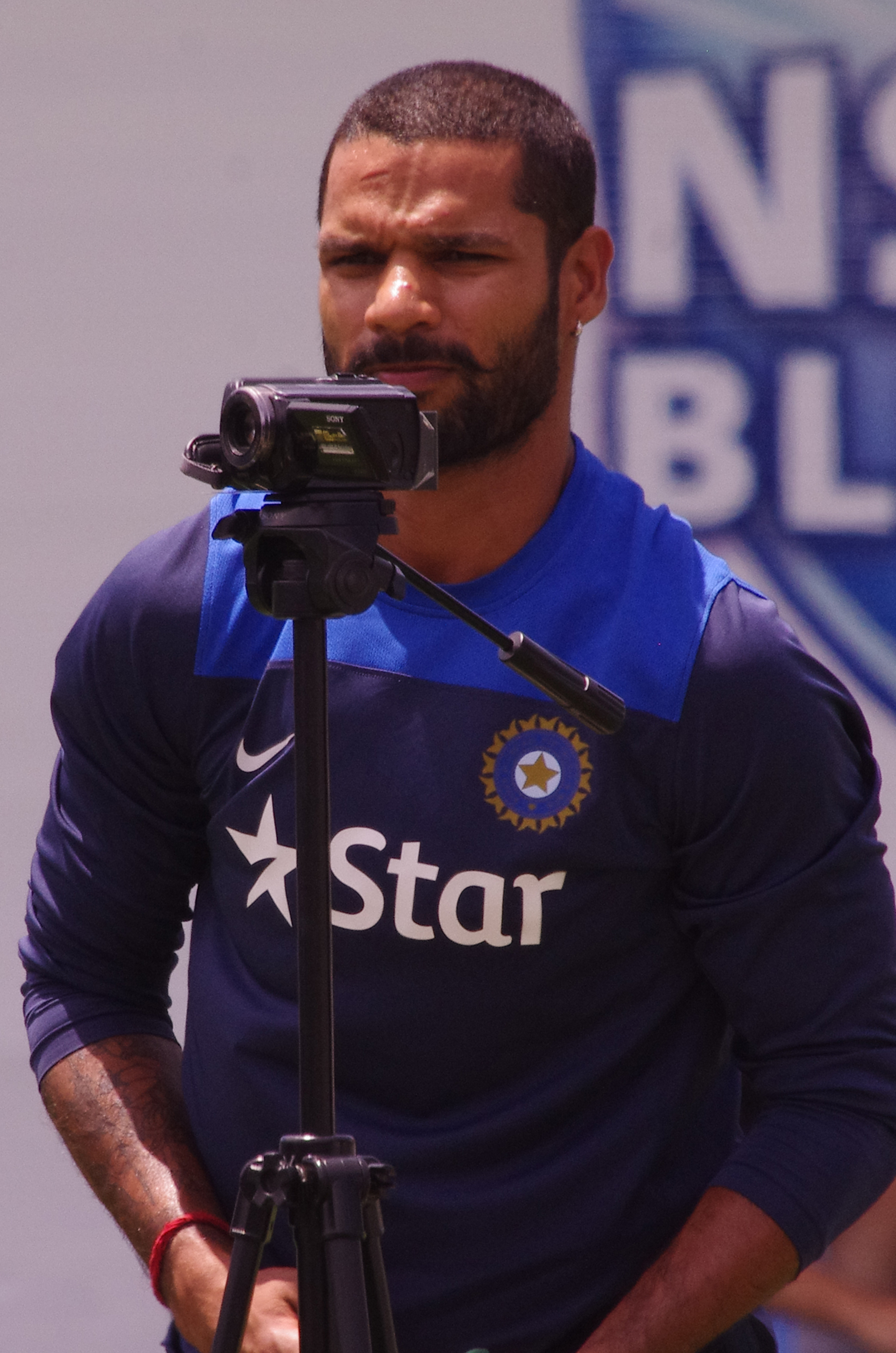
- Shikhar Dhawan
  5 December – Shikhar Dhawan, cricketer.
- 7 December – Purav Raja, tennis player.
- 14 December – Syed Rahim Nabi, footballer
- 21 December – Andrea Jeremiah, actress and singer.

== Deaths ==
- 31 October – Hardit Malik, diplomat, civil servant and cricketer (born 1894)
- 6 November – Sanjeev Kumar, actor (born 1938).
- 3 December - Satya Bhakta, founders of Communist Party of India (b.1897)

== See also ==
- Bollywood films of 1985
