= 1988 in India =

- Centuries: 18th; 19th; 20th; 21st
- Decades: 1960s; 1970s; 1980s; 1990s; 2000s
- See also: List of years in India; Timeline of Indian history

Events in the year 1988 in the Republic of India.

== Incumbents ==
- President of India – R. Venkataraman
- Prime Minister of India – Rajiv Gandhi
- Vice President of India – Shankar Dayal Sharma
- Chief Justice of India – Raghunandan Swarup Pathak

=== Governors ===
- Andhra Pradesh – Kumud Ben Joshi
- Arunachal Pradesh – R. D. Pradhan
- Assam – Bhishma Narain Singh
- Bihar – P. Venkatasubbaiah (until 25 February), Govind Narain Singh (starting 25 February)
- Goa – Gopal Singh
- Gujarat – Ram Krishna Trivedi
- Haryana – Saiyid Muzaffar Husain Burney (until 21 February), Hari Anand Barari (starting 22 February)
- Himachal Pradesh – R. K. S. Ghandhi
- Jammu and Kashmir – Jagmohan Malhotra
- Karnataka – Pendekanti Venkatasubbaiah
- Kerala – P. Ramachandran (until 23 February), Ram Dulari Sinha (starting 23 February)
- Madhya Pradesh – K.M Chandy
- Maharashtra – vacant thereafter (until 23 February), Ram Dulari Sinha (starting 23 February)
- Manipur – K. V. Krishna Rao
- Meghalaya – Bhishma Narain Singh
- Mizoram – Hiteswar Saikia
- Nagaland – K. V. Krishna Rao
- Odisha – Bishambhar Nath Pande (until 20 November), Saiyid Nurul Hasan (starting 20 November)
- Punjab – Siddhartha Shankar Ray
- Rajasthan – Sukhdev Prasad (starting 20 February)
- Sikkim – T.V. Rajeswar
- Tamil Nadu – Sundar Lal Khurana (until 16 February), P. C. Alexander (starting 16 February)
- Tripura – K. V. Krishna Rao
- Uttar Pradesh – Mohammed Usman Arif
- West Bengal – Saiyid Nurul Hasan

== Events ==
- National income - ₹4,293,630 million

=== January - August ===
- 6 January - V. N. Janaki becomes the first women Chief Minister of Tamil Nadu following death of M. G. Ramachandran.
- 7 January - Viswanathan Anand became first Grandmaster (chess) from India by winning.
- 28 January - Pandemonium in Tamil Nadu Legislative Assembly during Motion of no confidence against Janaki ministry.
- 30 January - President of India dismissed Janaki ministry following Governor Sundar Lal Khurana's recommendation.
- 2 February - Elections to legislative assemblies of Meghalaya and Tripura held.
- 9–18 May - Operation Black Thunder
- 2 June - Legendary actor and filmmaker Raj Kapoor dies
- 8 July - Peruman railway accident claims 105 lives.
- 18 July - Rupan Deol Bajaj case
- 6 August – The 1988 Myanmar–India earthquake measuring magnitude 7.3 strikes the Sagaing–Assam border, killing 5 people and leaving over 30 injured or missing.
- 10 August - Chief minister of Karnataka Ramakrishna Hegde resigns following Wiretapping scandal against him.
- 21 August – The 6.9 M_{w} Bihar earthquake shook northern Bihar near Nepal with a maximum Mercalli intensity of VIII (Severe), killing 709–1,450.
- August - The Statesman accuses Lalit Suri, a close confidant of Rajiv Gandhi for accepting 6.61 crore rupees as bribe from Sumitomo Corporation related to HVJ Gas Pipeline works of Oil and Natural Gas Corporation through entities based in London and Panama.

=== September - December ===
- 23–26 September - Floods in Punjab, Haryana due to heavy rains in Bhakra.
- October – Maximum lending rate abolished. Banks free to charge customers according to their credit record.
- 11 October - Janata Dal formed under the leadership of V. P. Singh.
- 20 December - Rajya Sabha passes the Sixty-first Amendment of the Constitution of India which brings down voting age from 21 to 18.
- 26 December - caste violence between Kapus and Kammas erupts in costal districts of Andhra Pradesh following death of a Congress I M.L.A named Vangaveeti Mohana Ranga Rao.

=== Date unknown ===
- The National Consumer Disputes Redressal Commission is set up under the Consumer Protection Act of 1986.
- Shadow of the Almighty Faith Tabernacle Ministries is founded.

== Law ==
- April – Security & Exchange Board of India established to deal with the development and regulation of the securities market and investor protection.
- The Discount and Finance House of India, set up as a money market institution, commenced operations.
- July – The National Housing Bank established as an apex body of housing finance and to promote activities in housing development.
- August – Stock Holding Corporation of India, a depository institution, commenced operations.

== Births ==
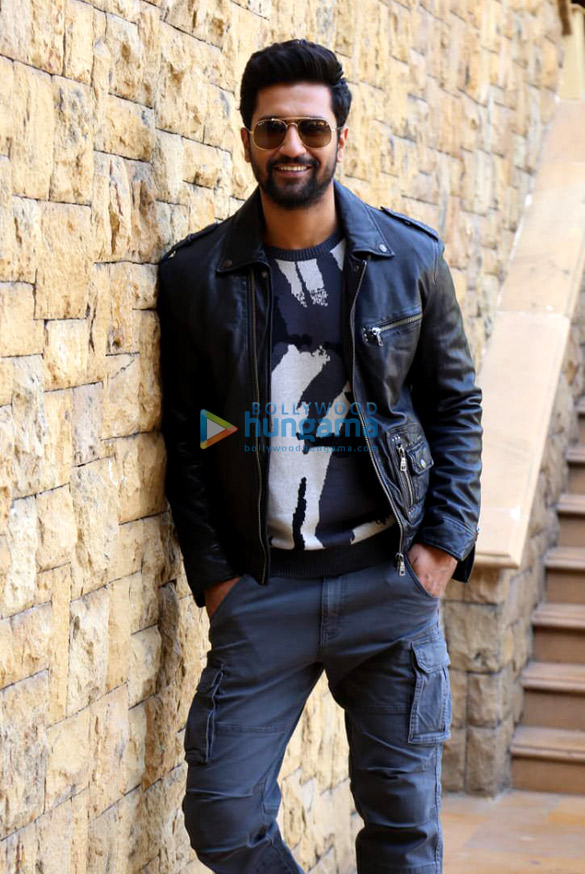
- Vicky Kaushal
  4 January – Nabila Jamshed, novelist.
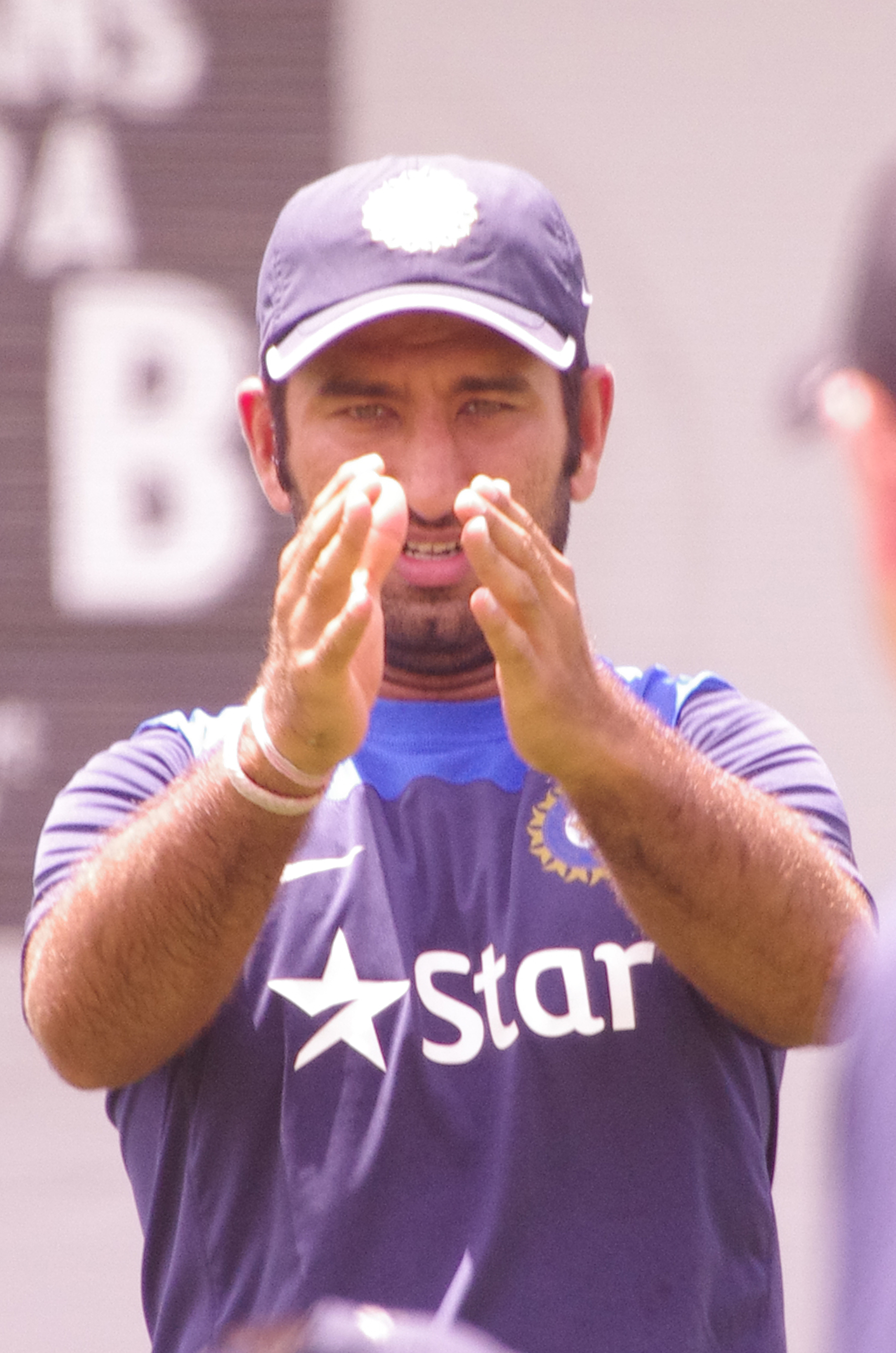
- Cheteshwar Pujara
  25 January – Cheteshwar Pujara, cricketer.
- 20 February – Jiah Khan, actress.(d.2013)
- 5 March – Khonthoujam Boboi Singh, Indian footballer
- 8 April
  - Saqib Saleem, model and actor.
  - Nithya Menen, actress.
- 1 May – Anushka Sharma, actress and film producer.
- 6 May - Rakul Preet Singh, actress
- 16 May – Vicky Kaushal, actor
- 6 June - Ajinkya Rahane, cricketer.
- 15 June - Kriti Kharbanda, actress
- 10 July - Manjari Fadnis, film actress
- 26 July – Akanksha Puri, actress and model.
- 21 August – Sana Khan, actress and businesswoman.
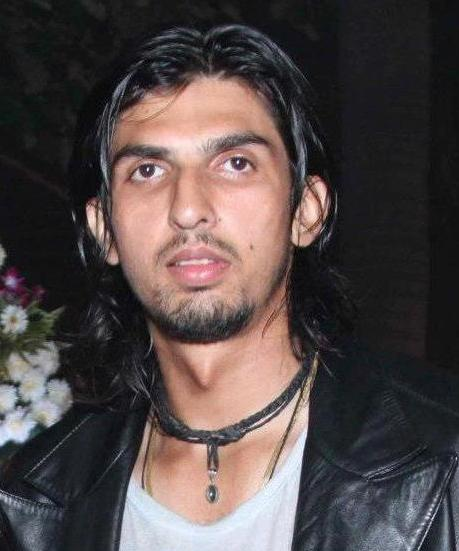
- Ishant Sharma
  2 September - Ishant Sharma, cricketer.
- 6 September – Sargun Mehta, TV actress
- 12 September – Prachi Desai, actress.
- 22 September
  - Sana Saeed, actress and model.
  - Jay Shah, cricket administrator
- 26 September – Sandhya, film actress
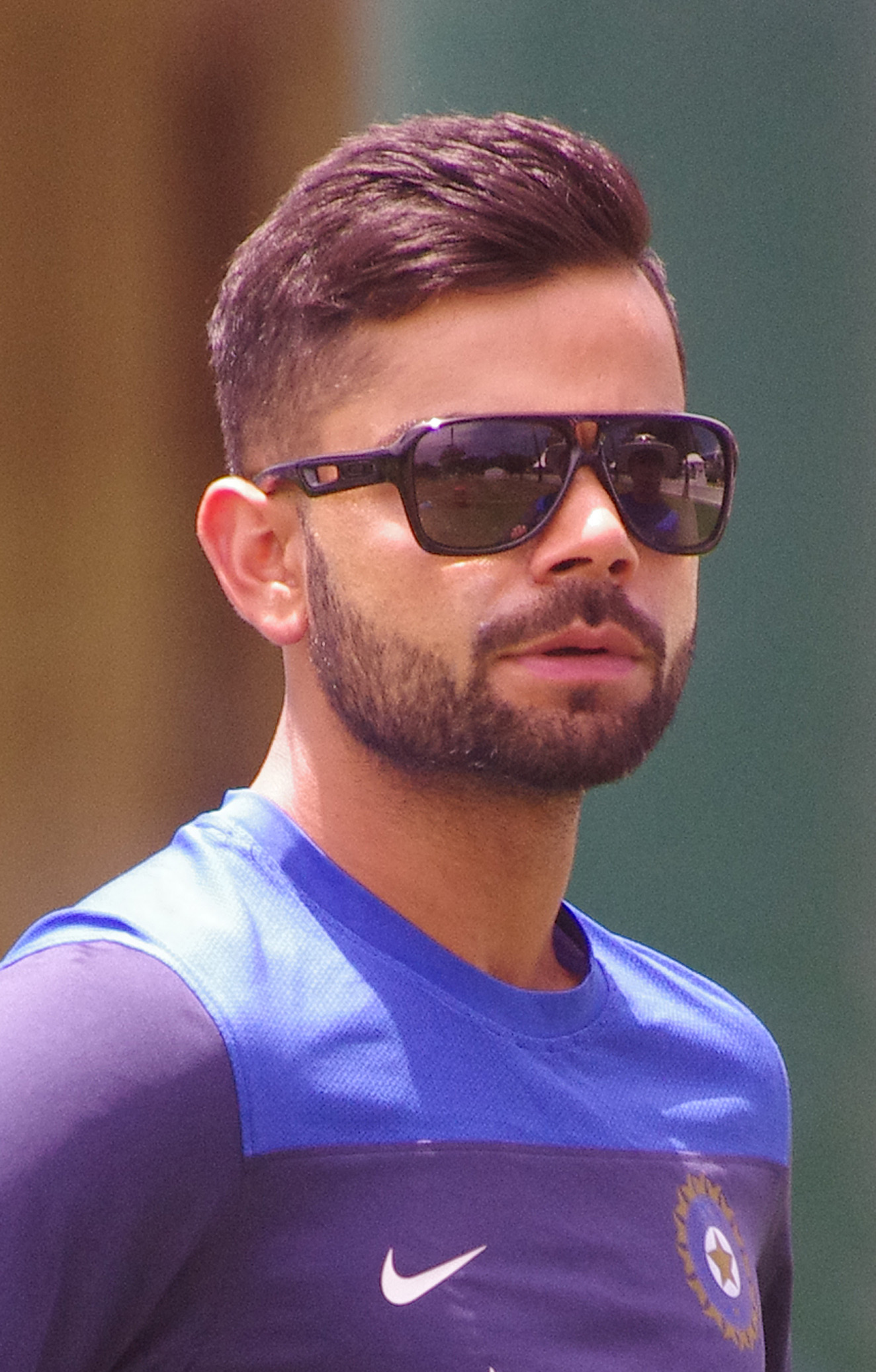
- Virat Kohli
  5 November – Virat Kohli, cricketer
- 25 November – Rochelle Rao, model and anchor.
- 28 November – Yami Gautam, actress.
- 6 December - Ravindra Jadeja, cricketer.
- 24 December – Piyush Chawla, cricketer.

== Deaths ==
- August – Mahendra Lal Wadhwa, freedom fighter (born 1900)
- 29 October – Kamaladevi Chattopadhyay, social reformer and freedom fighter (born 1903)
- 24 December – Jainendra Kumar, novelist (born 1905)
- 2 June – Raj Kapoor, actor in Bollywood (born 1924)

=== Full date unknown ===
- Majnun Gorakhpuri, writer and literary critic (born 1904)

== See also ==
- Bollywood films of 1988
