= 1984 in India =

- Centuries: 18th; 19th; 20th; 21st
- Decades: 1960s; 1970s; 1980s; 1990s; 2000s
- See also: List of years in India; Timeline of Indian history

Events in the year 1984 in the Republic of India.

== Incumbents ==
- President of India – Zail Singh
- Prime Minister of India – Indira Gandhi until 31 October, Rajiv Gandhi
- Vice President of India – Mohammad Hidayatullah until 30 August; R. Venkataraman
- Chief Justice of India – Yeshwant Vishnu Chandrachud

=== Governors ===
- Andhra Pradesh – Thakur Ram Lal (until 29 August), Shankar Dayal Sharma (starting 29 August)
- Assam –
  - until 28 March: Prakash Mehrotra
  - 28 March-15 April: Tribeni Sahai Misra
  - starting 15 April: Bhishma Narain Singh
- Bihar – Akhlaqur Rahman Kidwai
- Gujarat – K.M. Chandy (until 26 April), Braj Kumar Nehru (starting 26 April)
- Haryana – Ganpatrao Devji Tapase (until 13 June), Saiyid Muzaffar Husain Burney (starting 13 June)
- Himachal Pradesh – Hokishe Sema
- Jammu and Kashmir – B. K. Nehru (until 26 April), Jagmohan Malhotra (starting 26 April)
- Karnataka – Ashoknath Banerji
- Kerala – P. Ramachandran
- Madhya Pradesh – B. D. Sharma (starting 14 May), K.M Chandy (starting 14 May)
- Maharashtra – Idris Hasan Latif
- Manipur – S. M. H. Burney (until 11 June), K. V. Krishna Rao (starting 11 June)
- Meghalaya –
  - until 29 March: Prakash Mehrotra
  - 29 March-15 April: Tribeni Sahai Misra
  - starting 15 April: Bhishma Narain Singh
- Nagaland – S. M. H. Burney (until 11 June), K. V. Krishna Rao (starting 11 June)
- Odisha – Bishambhar Nath Pande
- Punjab – Bhairab Dutt Pande (until 3 July), Kershasp Tehmurasp Satarawala (starting 3 July)
- Rajasthan – Om Prakash Mehra
- Sikkim – Homi J. H. Taleyarkhan (until 17 June), Kona Prabhakar Rao (starting 17 June)
- Tamil Nadu – Sundar Lal Khurana
- Tripura – S. M. H. Burney (until 11 June), K. V. Krishna Rao (starting 11 June)
- Uttar Pradesh – Chandeshwar Prasad Narayan Singh
- West Bengal –
  - until 16 August: Anant Prasad Sharma
  - 16 August-1 October: Satish Chandra
  - starting 1 October: Uma Shankar Dikshit

== Events ==
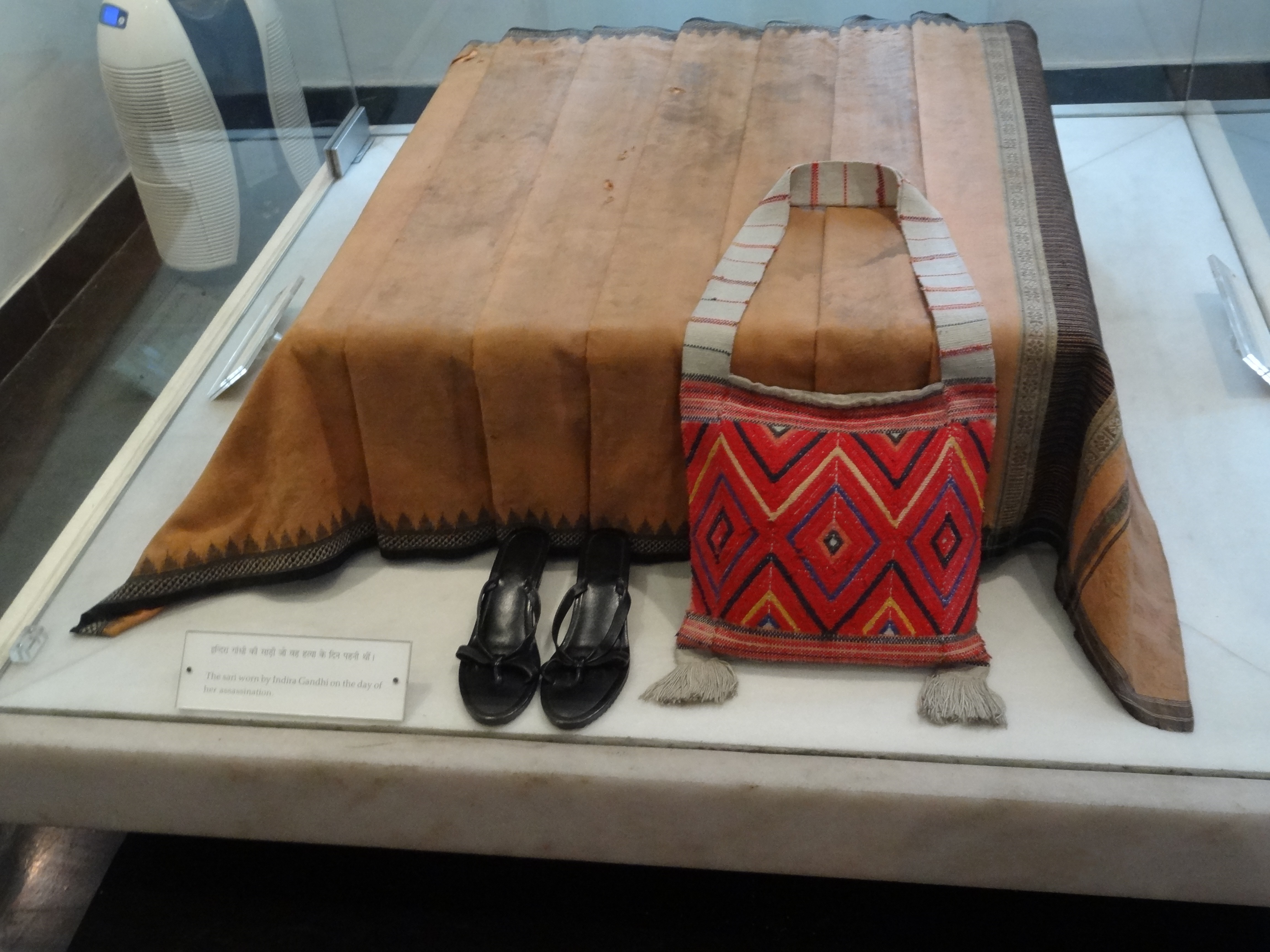
Assassination of Indira Gandhi: Indira Gandhi's blood-stained saree and her belongings at the time of her assassination, preserved at the Indira Gandhi Memorial Museum in New Delhi.

- National income - ₹2,521,882 million

=== January - June ===
- 6 February - Killing of Ravindra Mhatre by Kashmiri separatists.
- 11 February - Kashmiri separatist Maqbool Bhat hanged to death.
- 5 March – Prime Minister of India Indira Gandhi orders Operation Blue Star.
- 2 April – Squadron Leader Rakesh Sharma is launched into space, aboard the Soyuz T-11.
- 13 April – India launches Operation Meghdoot, as most of the Siachen Glacier in Kashmir comes under Indian control.
- 14 April - Kanshi Ram founded Bahujan Samaj Party.
- 23 May - Bachendri Pal becomes first Indian women to reach the summit of Mount Everest.
- 24 May - Kasargod district formed in Kerala.
- 1 June – The Indian government begins Operation Blue Star.
- 4 June – Indian troops storm the Golden Temple at Amritsar, the Sikhs' holiest shrine.

=== July - December ===
- 7 July - Doordarshan telecast first television drama Hum Log.
- 8 August - PT Usha misses Olympic medal by 1/100 of a second in 1984 Summer Olympics.
- 24 August - The first 3D film in India My Dear Kuttichathan was released.
- 16 October - Prime Minister Indira Gandhi flew down to Madras to visit M. G. Ramachandran, Chief Minister of Tamil Nadu who was hospitalized following Stroke.
- 24 October - India's first metro Kolkata metro started.
- 31 October – Indian Prime Minister Indira Gandhi is assassinated by her two Sikh security guards. Her son Rajiv Gandhi succeeds her as Prime Minister.
- 31 October – 3 November – 1984 anti-Sikh riots: An estimated 2,700-10,000 Sikhs killed during the anti-Sikh riots in Delhi and other areas; mobs loot and damage several Sikh homes, businesses and Gurdwaras in response to the assassination of Indira Gandhi.
- 5 November - M. G. Ramachandran, Chief Minister of Tamil Nadu airlifted to Downstate Medical Center from Apollo Hospital Madras.
- 15 November - Silent Valley declared as a National Park.
- 3 December – Bhopal disaster: A methyl isocyanate leak from a Union Carbide pesticide plant in Bhopal, Madhya Pradesh, kills more than 2,000 people outright and injures anywhere from 15,000 to 22,000 others (some 6,000 of whom later die from their injuries) in one of the worst industrial disasters in history.

=== Dates not known ===
- Thakazhi Sivasankara Pillai got Jnanpith Award.
- Government issued postal stamp of freedom fighter Mangal Pandey
- June - September - Operation woodrose by Indian Army.
- 31 October - 5 December - 1984 anti-Sikh riots

=== Law ===
In 1984 by the law Ministry of Environment and Forests are established.

== Arts and literature ==
- Indian National Trust for Art and Cultural Heritage, autonomous non-governmental organisation seeking to preserve Indian culture and heritage, is founded.

== Births ==
- 4 January – Jeeva, actor.
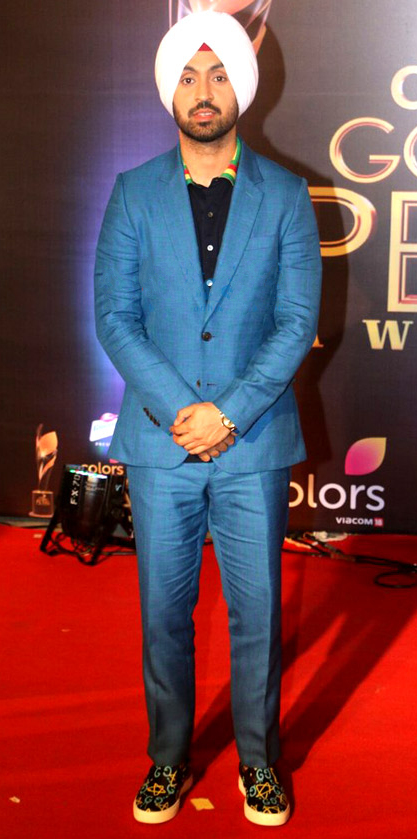
- Diljit Dosanjh
  6 January - Diljit Dosanjh, Indian Punjabi Singer.
- 4 February – Sandeep Acharya, singer (d. 2013)
- 12 March – Shreya Ghoshal, playback singer.
- 24 March – Adrian D'Souza, field hockey player.
- 1 April - Murali Vijay, cricketer.
- 2 April - Deep Sidhu, actor and activist (d. 2022).
- 30 May - Rohini Sindhuri, Indian Administrative Service officer.
- 21 June – Nelson Dilipkumar, Film Director.
- 27 August - Y. S. Avinash Reddy, politician and member of parliament from Kadapa.
- 6 September – Diwakar Prasad, boxer.
- 19 September – Kavya Madhavan, actress.
- 23 September – Armstrong Pame, Indian Administrative Service officer.
- 18 October – Freida Pinto, actress
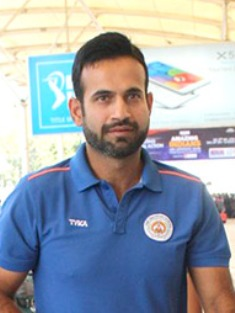
- Irfan Pathan
  27 October – Irfan Pathan, cricketer.
- 12 November -Lavanya Bhardwaj, Indian Television Actor
- 18 November – Nayantara, actress.
- 23 November – Amruta Khanvilkar, actress

== Deaths ==
- 10 March – I. S. Johar, actor, writer, producer and director (born 1920)
- 21 June – Arun Sarnaik, Renowned Marathi film actor, singer (born 1935)
- 6 June - Jarnail Singh Bhindranwale, militant, killed in Operation Blue Star (born 1947)
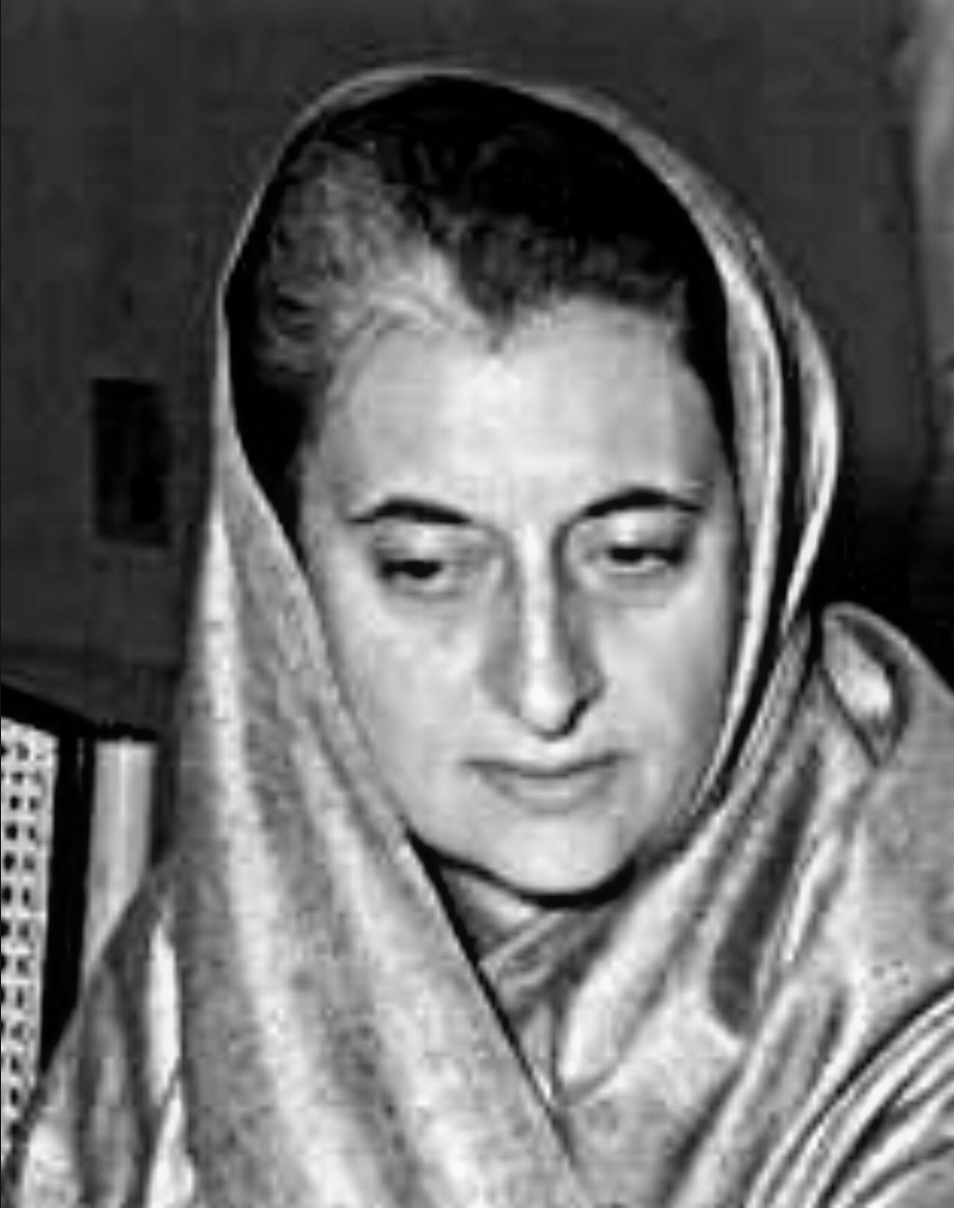
- Indira Gandhi
  31 October – Indira Gandhi, Prime Minister, assassinated (born 1917)
- 5 November – Rehman, actor (born 1921)
- 25 November - Yashwantrao Chavan, chief minister of Maharashtra (born 1913)
- 31 December - K. R. Ramanathan, physicist and meteorologist (born 1893)

=== Full date unknown ===
- Gopi Krishna, yogi, mystic, teacher, social reformer and writer (born 1903).

== See also ==
- Bollywood films of 1984
