= 1986 in India =

- Centuries: 18th; 19th; 20th; 21st
- Decades: 1960s; 1970s; 1980s; 1990s; 2000s
- See also: List of years in India; Timeline of Indian history

Events in the year 1986 in the Republic of India.

== Incumbents ==
- President of India – Zail Singh
- Prime Minister of India – Rajiv Gandhi
- Vice President of India – R. Venkataraman
- Chief Justice of India – Prafullachandra Natwarlal Bhagwati (until 20 December), Raghunandan Swarup Pathak

=== Governors ===
- Andhra Pradesh – Kumud Ben Joshi
- Assam – Bhishma Narain Singh
- Bihar – P. Venkatasubbaiah
- Gujarat – Braj Kumar Nehru (until 26 February), Ram Krishna Trivedi (starting 26 February)
- Haryana – Saiyid Muzaffar Husain Burney
- Himachal Pradesh –
  - until 7 March: Hokishe Sema
  - 7 March-16 April: Prabodh Dinkarrao Desai
  - starting 16 April: R. K. S. Ghandhi
- Jammu and Kashmir – Jagmohan Malhotra
- Karnataka – Ashoknath Banerji
- Kerala – P. Ramachandran
- Madhya Pradesh – K.M Chandy
- Maharashtra – Kona Prabhakara Rao (until 2 April), Shankar Dayal Sharma (starting 2 April)
- Manipur – K. V. Krishna Rao
- Meghalaya – Bhishma Narain Singh
- Nagaland – K. V. Krishna Rao
- Odisha – Bishambhar Nath Pande
- Punjab – Shankar Dayal Sharma (until 2 April), Siddhartha Shankar Ray (starting 2 April)
- Rajasthan – Vasantdada Patil
- Sikkim – T.V. Rajeswar
- Tamil Nadu – Sundar Lal Khurana
- Tripura – K. V. Krishna Rao
- Uttar Pradesh – Mohammed Usman Arif
- West Bengal – Uma Shankar Dikshit (until 12 August), Saiyid Nurul Hasan (starting 12 August)

== Events ==
- National income - ₹3,183,659 million

=== January - June ===
- 1 February – Locks of the disputed Ram Janmabhoomi & Babri Masjid were opened following the orders of Sessions Court Faizabad.
- 24 March – Contract signed between the Government of India and Swedish arms company Bofors for supply of 410 155 mm Howitzer field guns. (Bofors deal)
- 1 April – VSNL incorporated and Mahanagar Telephone Nigam Limited setup heralding beginning of Telecom revolution through Public call office.
- 30 April – Operation Black Thunder conducted to flush out remaining Sikh extremists from the Golden Temple
- 1 May – A new National Policy on Education announced by the Government.
- 14 May - Tamil Nadu Legislative Assembly passes a resolution to abolish Tamil Nadu Legislative Council.
- May - Two doctors in Madras named Dr. Suniti Solomon and Dr. Sellappan Nirmala finds the first HIV/AIDS cases in India in samples collected from Sex workers with help of Christian Medical College Vellore.
- 30 June - Mizoram Peace Accord signed between Mizo National Front and Government of India.

=== July - December ===
- 11 August - Supreme Court of India delivered landmark judgement which upholds Freedom of speech and expression in Bijoe Emmanuel Vs State of Kerala case. In this case court said that no law mandates singing National Anthem of India compulsory.
- 22 September – Australia-India test cricket match ends in a tie at the M. A. Chidambaram Stadium, Chepauk, Chennai, becoming only the second tied test in the history.
- 27 October – Inland Waterways Authority of India came into existence.
- 18 November – Operation Brasstacks starts in Rajasthan.
- November – 182-day Treasury Bill introduced
- 7 December - Riots erupted in Bangalore and adjoining districts killing 17 following an article in Deccan Herald titled Mohammed the Idiot.

== Law ==
- 19 November – Environment Protection Act that was passed in month of May in consequence to Bhopal disaster, came into force.
- 24 December – Consumer Protection Act

== Births ==
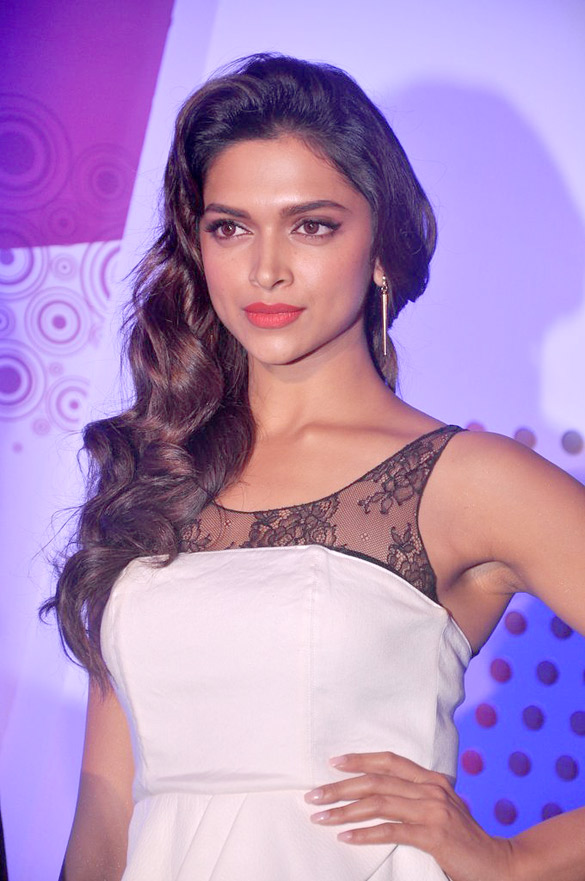
- Deepika Padukone
  5 January – Deepika Padukone, actress.
- 8 January – Yash, actor.
- 15 January – Vikram Prabhu, actor.
- 21 January – Sushant Singh Rajput, actor.
- 28 January – Shruti Haasan, actress and singer.
- 4 February – Asif Ali, actor.
- 20 February – Kalaiyarasan, actor.
- 23 February – Sanjana Singh, actress.
- 27 February – Shishir Hathwar, Guinness World Record holder.
- 14 March – Lokesh Kanagaraj, film director.
- 6 June – Bhavana (actress), actress.
- 16 June – Anjali (actress), actress.
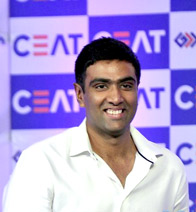
- Ravichandran Ashwin
  17 September – Ravichandran Ashwin, cricketer.
- 28 July – Dulquer Salmaan, actor
- 24 August – Shanthanu Bhagyaraj, actor.
- 21 September – Atlee Kumar, film director.
- 2 October – Praveen Kumar, cricketer.
- 17 October – T. V. Anupama, Indian Administrative Service officer.
- 28 October – Aditi Rao Hydari, actress and dancer.
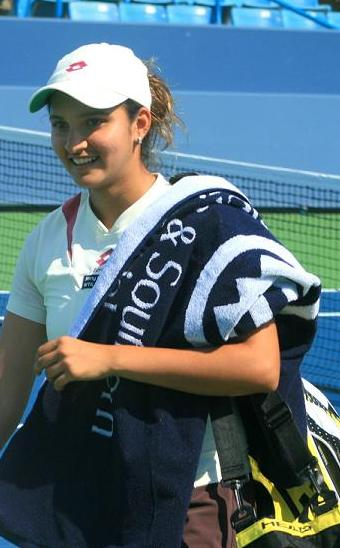
- Sania Mirza
  15 November – Sania Mirza, tennis player.
- 23 November – Naga Chaitanya, actor.
- 27 November – Suresh Raina, cricketer.
- 16 December-Vin Rana, Indian Television Actor

== Deaths ==
- 25 May –Shrikant Verma, poet and politician (born 1931).
- 27 May – Ajoy Mukherjee, politician, Chief Minister of West Bengal (born 1901).
- 6 July – Jagjivan Ram, freedom fighter and social reformer (born 1908).
- 13 December – Smita Patil, actress (born 1955).
- 20 December - Floriano Vaz, aged 23 martyr of Konkani language agitation

== See also ==
- Bollywood films of 1986
