= 1987 in India =

- Centuries: 18th; 19th; 20th; 21st
- Decades: 1960s; 1970s; 1980s; 1990s; 2000s
- See also: List of years in India; Timeline of Indian history

Events in the year 1987 in the Republic of India.

== Incumbents ==
- President of India – Zail Singh until 25 July, R. Venkataraman
- Prime Minister of India – Rajiv Gandhi
- Vice President of India – R. Venkataraman until 24 July, Shankar Dayal Sharma
- Chief Justice of India – Raghunandan Swarup Pathak

=== Governors ===
- Andhra Pradesh – Kumud Ben Joshi
- Arunachal Pradesh –
  - 20 February-18 March: Bhishma Narain Singh
  - starting 18 March: R. D. Pradhan
- Assam – Bhishma Narain Singh
- Bihar – P. Venkatasubbaiah
- Goa – Gopal Singh (starting 30 May)
- Gujarat – Ram Krishna Trivedi
- Haryana – Saiyid Muzaffar Husain Burney
- Himachal Pradesh – R. K. S. Ghandhi
- Jammu and Kashmir – Jagmohan Malhotra
- Karnataka – Ashoknath Banerji (until 26 February), Pendekanti Venkatasubbaiah (starting 26 February)
- Kerala – P. Ramachandran
- Madhya Pradesh –
  - until 30 November: K.M Chandy
  - 30 November-29 December: Narayan Dutta Ojha
  - starting 29 December: K.M Chandy
- Maharashtra – Shankar Dayal Sharma (until 3 September), vacant thereafter (starting 3 September)
- Manipur – K. V. Krishna Rao
- Meghalaya – Bhishma Narain Singh
- Mizoram – Hiteswar Saikia
- Nagaland – K. V. Krishna Rao
- Odisha – Bishambhar Nath Pande
- Punjab – Siddhartha Shankar Ray
- Rajasthan – Vasantdada Patil (until 15 October), vacant thereafter (starting 15 October)
- Sikkim – T.V. Rajeswar
- Tamil Nadu – Sundar Lal Khurana
- Tripura – K. V. Krishna Rao
- Uttar Pradesh – Mohammed Usman Arif
- West Bengal – Saiyid Nurul Hasan

== Events ==
- National income - ₹3,618,647 million

=== January - June ===
- January – Board for Industrial and Financial Reconstruction set up and became operational with effect from May reflecting concerns related to Industrial Sickness and republic day
- 17 January - Rajiv Gandhi laid the foundation stone for Indian Naval Academy at Ezhimala, Kannur.
- 4 February - The Goa, Daman and Diu Official Language bill passed in Goa, Daman and Diu legislative assembly bringing an end to Konkani language agitation.
- 7 March - Sunil Gavaskar becomes the first man to score 10,000 runs in Test cricket.
- 19 March - 1987 Opera House heist
- 23 March - Controversial 1987 Jammu and Kashmir Legislative Assembly election held.
- March – Magnetic ink character recognition technology introduced for cheque clearing.
- March - June - 1987 Meerut riots
- 12 April - V. P. Singh resigns as Defence Minister of India following his disclosure about kickbacks in defense deals by predecessors.
- May - 1987 Sino-Indian skirmish the second such conflict between China and India ended.
- 22 May - Hashimpura massacre.
- 30 May – The Union territory was split, and Goa was elevated as India's twenty-fifth state, with Daman and Diu remaining Union Territories
- 4 June - Operation Poomalai by India in Jaffna.
- June - Minister of External Affairs N. D. Tiwari visits North Korea as part of ministerial conference of Non-Aligned Movement.

=== July - December ===
- 15 July - Neerukonda massacre of Dalits in Andhra Pradesh.
- 29 July - Indo-Sri Lanka Accord to restore peace in the island signed.
- 30 July - Assault on Prime Minister of India Rajiv Gandhi by a Sri Lanka Navy sailor named Vijitha Rohana during Guard of honour at Colombo.
- 4 September - Roop Kanwar case - last known incident of Sati in India, occurred at Sikar district.
- October – ICC Cricket World Cup (Reliance Cup 1987)
- 11 - 12 October - Jaffna University Helidrop by Indian Peace Keeping Force
- 20 November–27 November – The South Asian Games are held in Calcutta.
- 28 December - Indira Gandhi Institute of Development Research was established by RBI as an advanced studies institute to promote research on development issues from a multi-disciplinary point of view.

== Births ==
- 1 January – Neha Sharma, actress and model.
- 3 March – Shraddha Kapoor, actress.
- 31 March – Janani Iyer, actress.
- 18 February – Mahat Raghavendra, actor
- 24 April – Varun Dhawan, actor
- 25 April – Mallika Kapoor, actress.
- 28 April – Samantha Ruth Prabhu, actress.

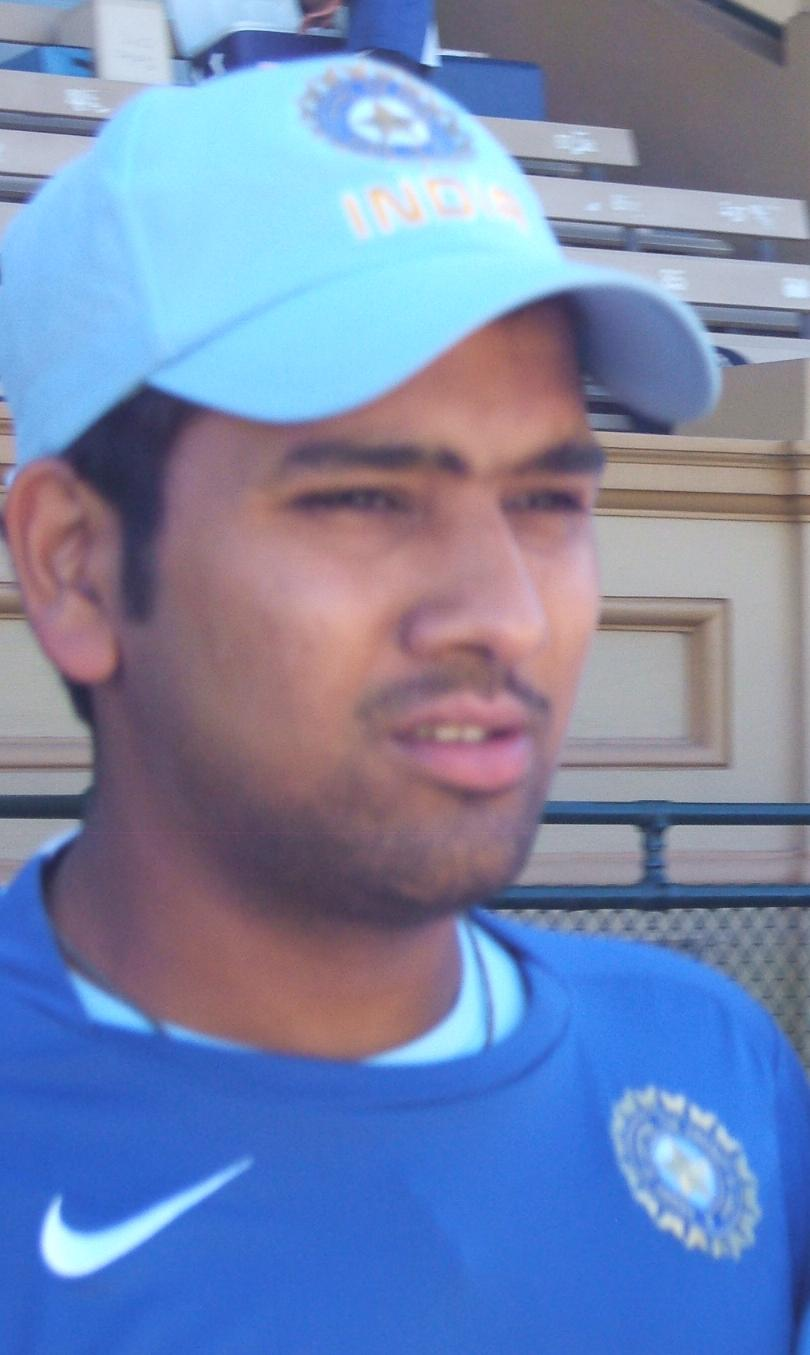
Rohit Sharma

- 30 April – Rohit Sharma, cricketer.
- 4 May – Charmy Kaur, actress.
- 7 May – Sundeep Kishan, actor, producer
- 2 June – Santhosh Prathap, actor
- 13 June – G. V. Prakash Kumar, film composer, singer and actor.
- 25 June – Anil Shetty, entrepreneur, author, activist and motivational speaker
- 3 July – Arjai, actor
- 1 August – Taapsee Pannu, actress.
- 5 August – Genelia D'Souza, actress.
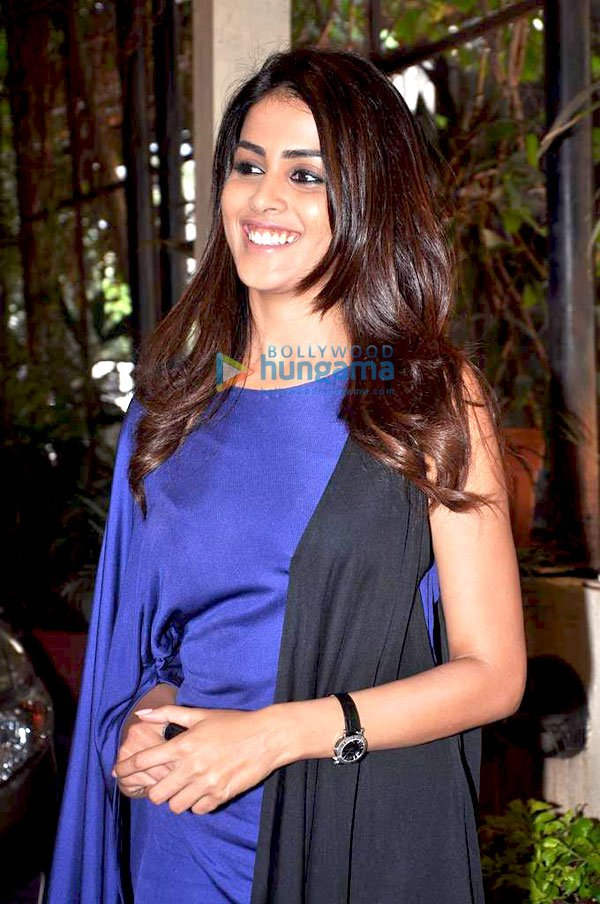
  Genelia Deshmukh
- 6 August – Aditya Narayan, actor, singer and television host.
- 27 August – Jim Sarbh, actor
- 25 October – Umesh Yadav, cricketer.
- 1 November – Ileana D'Cruz, actress.
- 20 November – Sukirti Kandpal, actress.
- 18 December – Ram Mohan Naidu Kinjarapu, politician, member of parliament from Srikakulam.
- 28 December – Diganth Manchale, actor

== Deaths ==
- 13 March – Hafizur Rahman Wasif Dehlavi, Islamic scholar, jurist and literary critic. (born 1910)
- 1 June – Khwaja Ahmad Abbas, film director, novelist, screenwriter and journalist (born 1914).
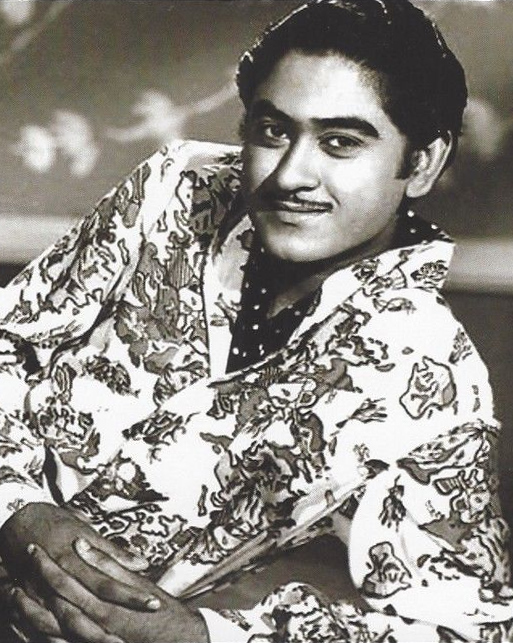
- Kishore Kumar
  13 October – Kishore Kumar, playback singer, actor, lyricist, composer, producer, director, screenwriter and scriptwriter (born 1929).
- 27 October – Vijay Merchant, cricketer (born 1911).
- 24 December – M. G. Ramachandran, Actor, Politician, Former Chief Minister of Tamil Nadu (born 1917).

=== Full date unknown ===
- Dasaradhi, poet and political activist (born 1925).

== See also ==
- Bollywood films of 1987
