= 1983 in India =

- Centuries: 18th; 19th; 20th; 21st
- Decades: 1960s; 1970s; 1980s; 1990s; 2000s
- See also: List of years in India; Timeline of Indian history

Events in the year 1983 in the Republic of India.

== Incumbents ==
- President of India – Zail Singh
- Prime Minister of India – Indira Gandhi
- Vice President of India – Mohammad Hidayatullah
- Chief Justice of India – Yeshwant Vishnu Chandrachud

=== Governors ===
- Andhra Pradesh – K. C. Abraham (until 15 August), Thakur Ram Lal (starting 15 August)
- Assam – Prakash Mehrotra
- Bihar – Akhlaqur Rahman Kidwai
- Gujarat – Sharda Mukherjee (until 6 August), K.M. Chandy (starting 6 August)
- Haryana – Ganpatrao Devji Tapase
- Himachal Pradesh – A. K. Banerjee (until 15 April), Hokishe Sema (starting 15 April)
- Jammu and Kashmir – B. K. Nehru
- Karnataka – Ashoknath Banerji
- Kerala – P. Ramachandran
- Madhya Pradesh –
  - until 20 September: B. D. Sharma
  - 20 September-7 October: G. P. Singh
  - starting 7 October: B. D. Sharma
- Maharashtra – Idris Hasan Latif
- Manipur – S. M. H. Burney
- Meghalaya – Prakash Mehrotra
- Nagaland – S. M. H. Burney
- Odisha – Cheppudira Muthana Poonacha (until 17 August), Bishambhar Nath Pande (starting 17 August)
- Punjab –
  - until 7 February: Marri Chenna Reddy
  - 7 February-21 February: Surjit Singh Sandhawalia
  - 21 February-10 October: Anant Prasad Sharma
  - starting 10 October: Bhairab Dutt Pande
- Rajasthan – Om Prakash Mehra
- Sikkim – Homi J. H. Taleyarkhan
- Tamil Nadu – Sundar Lal Khurana
- Tripura – S. M. H. Burney
- Uttar Pradesh – Chandeshwar Prasad Narayan Singh
- West Bengal – Bhairab Dutt Pande (until 10 October), Anant Prasad Sharma (starting 10 October)

== Events ==
- National income - ₹2,250,742 million
- February – Bandit queen Phoolan Devi surrenders.
- January - Rail Mazdoor Union formed by George Fernandes.
- 18 February – Nellie massacre: over 2,000 people, mostly Bangladeshi Muslims, were massacred during the Assam agitation.
- 25 June – India wins the cricket World Cup for the first time.
- September - Appiko Movement led by Panduranga Hegde in Uttara Kannada.
- November - The first Ekatmata Yatras held by Vishva Hindu Parishad.

== Arts and literature ==
- Ardh Satya wins Filmfare Best Movie Award.

== Sport ==
- 25 June – India wins the First Cricket World Cup at Lords under Kapil Dev.

== Births ==
- 24 January – D. Imman, film composer and singer.
- 6 February – Angad Bedi, actor, model and cricketer.
- 6 February – Sreesanth, cricketer.
- 19 March – Karthik Subbaraj, film director and producer.
- 30 March – Nithiin, actor and producer
- 4 May – Trisha Krishnan, actress.
- 15 May – Santhosh Narayanan, music composer and singer.
- 20 May – N. T. Rama Rao Jr., actor.
- 25 May - Kunal Khemu, Actor
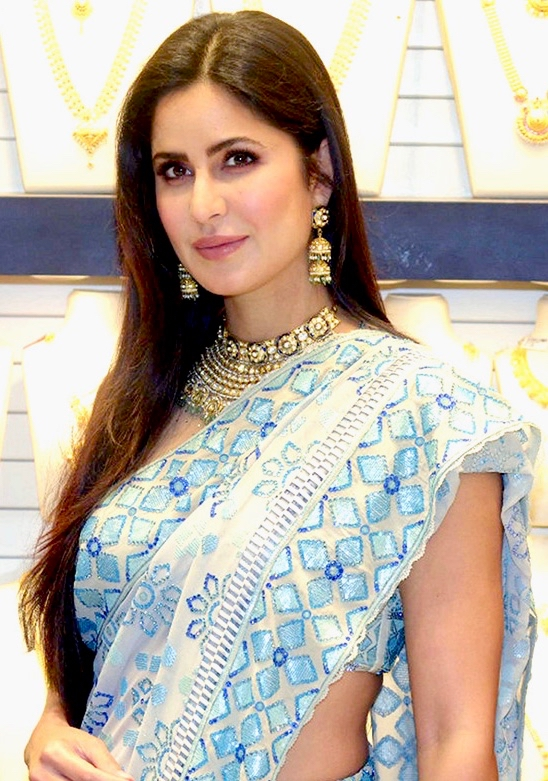
- Katrina Kaif
  16 July – Katrina Kaif, actress
- 28 June – Jaiveer Shergill, politician.
- 7 July – Rishab Shetty, actor and director.
- 19 July – Sindhu Tolani, actress
- 27 July – Soccor Velho, footballer (died 2013).
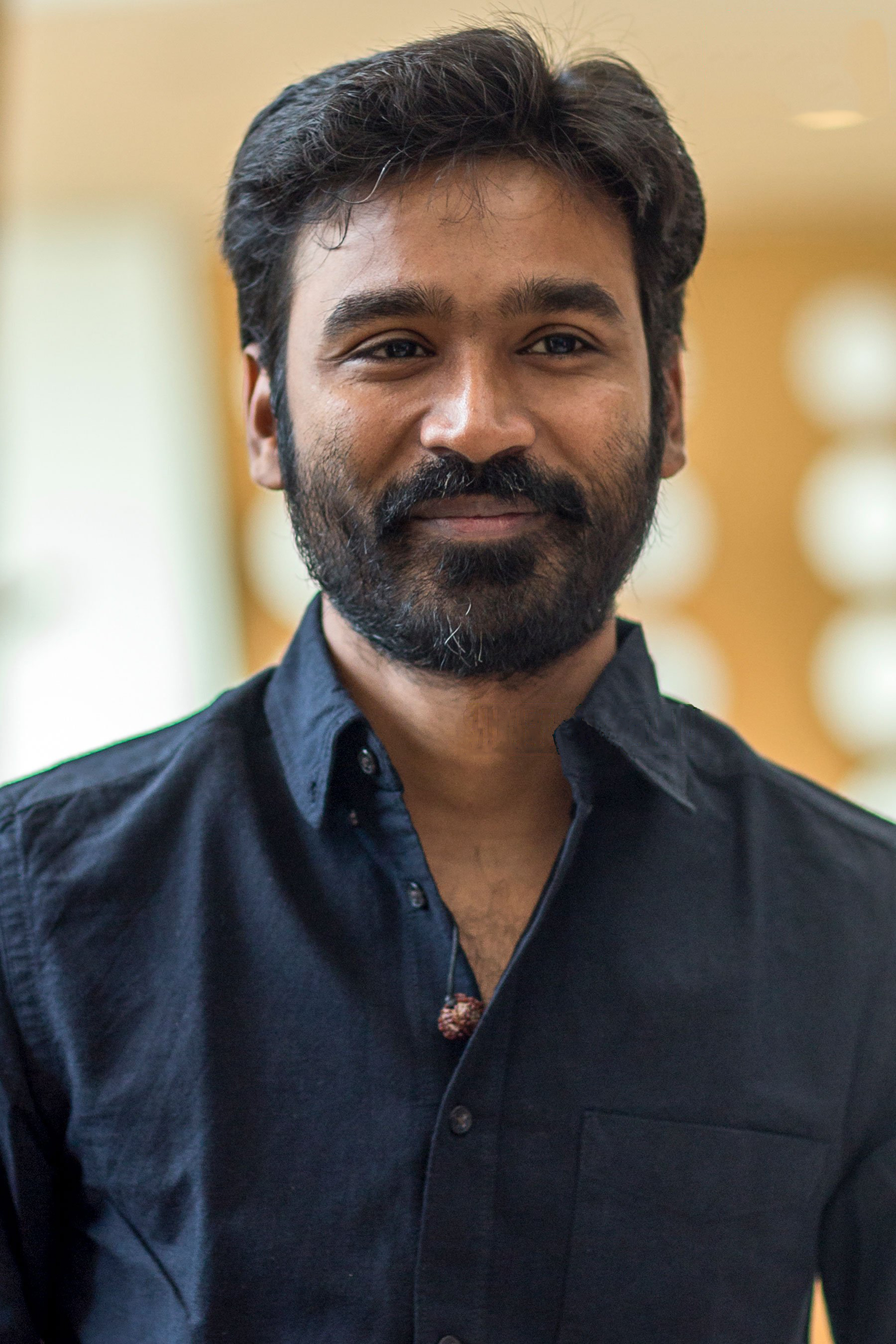
- Dhanush
  28 July – Dhanush, actor, producer, lyricist and playback singer.
- 14 August – Jennifer Kotwal, actress.
- 31 August – Ira Singhal, Indian Administrative Service officer.
- 17 September- Sanaya Irani, actress.
- 2 November – Nitin Menon, cricket umpire
- 16 November – Thaman S, music composer and playback singer.
- 23 November – Karan Patel, actor.
- 27 November - Suresh Raina, cricketer.
- 30 November – Nisha Kothari, actress.

== Deaths ==
- 11 June – Ghanshyam Das Birla, businessman (born 1894).
- 17 November – E. P. Poulose, politician (born 1909).

=== Date unknown ===
- Fatma Begum, actress and India's first female film director (born 1892).
- V. Ishwaraiah, pharmacology professor (born 1898).

== See also ==
- List of Bollywood films of 1983
