= 1989 in India =

- Centuries: 18th; 19th; 20th; 21st
- Decades: 1960s; 1970s; 1980s; 1990s; 2000s
- See also: List of years in India; Timeline of Indian history

Events in the year 1989 in the Republic of India.

In India 1989 was the year in which the political discourse of India started to change. A year marked with events that heralded the rise of Hindu nationalism, Kashmir militancy, Mandal Politics, Indian cricket etc. and marked the shift from era of single party rule to decades of coalition governments ahead. In socio-political discourse of country, this was a year which started the shift of, sense of history in minds of people from a consensus based one that emerged post 1947 to contested one that emerged along with Ram Janmabhoomi Andolan.

== Incumbents ==
- President of India – R. Venkataraman
- Prime Minister of India – Rajiv Gandhi until 2 December, V. P. Singh
- Vice President of India – Shankar Dayal Sharma
- Chief Justice of India –
  - until 18 June – Raghunandan Swarup Pathak
  - 19 June – 18 December – Engalaguppe Seetharamiah Venkataramiah
  - starting 18 December – Sabyasachi Mukharji

=== Governors ===
- Andhra Pradesh – Kumud Ben Joshi
- Arunachal Pradesh – R. D. Pradhan
- Assam –
  - until 10 May: Bhishma Narain Singh
  - 10 May-21 July: Harideo Joshi
  - starting 21 July: Anisetti Raghuvir
- Bihar –
  - until 24 January: Govind Narayan Singh
  - 24 January-28 January: Dipak Kumar Sen
  - 29 January-2 February: R.D. Pradhan
  - starting 3 March: Jagannath Pahadia
- Goa – Gopal Singh (until 17 July), Khurshed Alam Khan (starting 17 July)
- Gujarat – Ram Krishna Trivedi
- Haryana – Hari Anand Barari
- Himachal Pradesh – R. K. S. Ghandhi
- Jammu and Kashmir – Jagmohan Malhotra (until 11 July), K. V. Krishna Rao (starting 11 July)
- Karnataka – Pendekanti Venkatasubbaiah
- Kerala – Ram Dulari Sinha
- Madhya Pradesh – K.M Chandy (until 30 March), Sarla Grewal (starting 30 March)
- Maharashtra – Ram Dulari Sinha
- Manipur – K. V. Krishna Rao (until 7 July), Chintamani Panigrahi (starting 7 July)
- Meghalaya –
  - until 10 May: Bhishma Narain Singh
  - 11 May-26 July: Harideo Joshi
  - starting 27 July: A. A. Rahim
- Mizoram –
  - until 30 April: Hiteswar Saikia
  - 1 May-20 July: K. V. Krishna Rao
  - starting 21 July: W. A. Sangma
- Nagaland – K. V. Krishna Rao (until 19 July), Gopal Singh (starting 19 July)
- Odisha – Saiyid Nurul Hasan
- Punjab – Siddhartha Shankar Ray (until 8 December), Nirmal Kumar Mukherjee (starting 8 December)
- Rajasthan – Sukhdev Prasad (starting 20 February)
- Sikkim – T.V. Rajeswar (until 1 March), S.K. Bhatnagar (starting 1 March)
- Tamil Nadu – P. C. Alexander
- Tripura – K. V. Krishna Rao (until 11 July), Sultan Singh (starting 11 July)
- Uttar Pradesh – Mohammed Usman Arif
- West Bengal – Saiyid Nurul Hasan (until 20 March), T. V. Rajeswar (starting 20 March)

== Events ==
- National income - ₹4,932,776 million

=== January - May ===
- 6 January – Satwant Singh and Kehar Singh who were convicted in Assassination of Indira Gandhi hanged to death in Tihar Jail.
- 15 January – The first Darjeeling Gorkha Hill Council elections took place and Gorkha National Liberation Front under leadership of Subhash Ghisingh.
- 17 January – Indian aviation ministry announces plan for purchasing Soviet made commercial aircraft Yak 42, Tupolev Tu-204, Ilyushin Il-96 for national carriers Vayudoot, Indian Airlines and Air India respectively.
- 24 January – The second Mizoram Assembly After statehood came into power as a Congress (I) led government under leadership of Lal Thanhawla.
- 25 January – Congress (I) led government under chief minister ship of S. C. Jamir came into power in Nagaland post assembly elections.
- 27 January – DMK alliance led National Front government came into power in Tamil Nadu by sweeping the polls and giving a major setback to Congress (I).
- 14 February – Union Carbide agrees to pay US$470 million to the Indian government for damages it caused in the 1984 Bhopal Disaster.
- March – Certificate of Deposit and Commercial Paper introduced to widen the monetary instruments and give investors greater flexibility.
- 25 March - In a pandemonium in Tamil Nadu Legislative Assembly opposition leader J. Jayalalithaa physically assaulted by Dravida Munnetra Kazhagam M.L.A.
- April – Amendment to Banking, Public Financial Institution and Negotiable Instruments Laws enacted to encourage the culture of use of cheques in India. It introduced penalties for the dishonour of cheques.
- April – Service Area Approach for rural lending became operational.
- 22 May – India's first Intermediate-range ballistic missile, Agni was successfully launched from Chandipur, Odisha. It elevated India into a prestige league of only five nations in world with IRBM strategic capability. This was a landmark moment under Integrated Guided Missile Development Programme.

=== June - December ===
- 1 June – The Sri Lankan president Ranasinghe Premadasa publicly announced through press that Indian Peace Keeping Force must leave the island by 29 July 1989. The IPKF withdrawal started by 1989 and ended in March 1990.
- 1 July – CRR raised to 15% taking statutory preemptions of banks' resources in the form of the Statutory Liquidity Ratio and the Cash Reserve Ratio to over 53%.
- 7 November – Vishva Hindu Parishad leadership was allowed to lay foundation stone at Ayodhya dispute site. In run up to the election Rajiv Gandhi then Prime Minister gave permission to perform shilaanyaas.
- 9 November - Shilanyaas performed at Ayodhya.
- 15 November – Sachin Tendulkar makes his debut in international cricket.
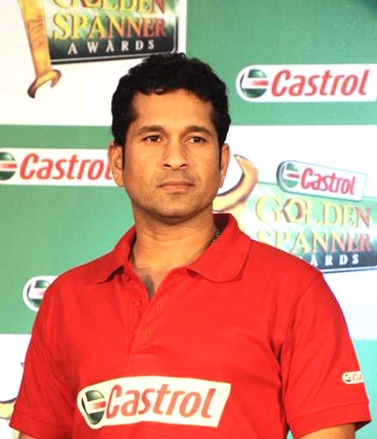
  Sachin Tendulkar, who made his debut in international cricket on 15 November 1989, went on to become one of the most renowned Indian cricketer around the world.
- 2 December – V.P. Singh becomes the Prime Minister of India after Lok Sabha elections. He came into power in a coalition led by Janata Dal as National Front with support of Bharatiya Janata Party, Telugu Desam Party and left parties. Despite being an upper caste he initiated the most revolutionary and controversial step of implementing Mandal Commission in the next year
- 8 December – 1989 kidnapping of Rubaiya Sayeed an event that helped militancy in Kashmir to gather momentum. Ms. Sayeed was daughter of then Home Minister of India, Mufti Mohammad Sayeed.
- 31 December - V. N. Janaki the former Chief Minister of Tamil Nadu quit politics.

== Births ==
- 30 January – Girish Kumar, film actor.
- 8 March – Harmanpreet Kaur, cricketer.
- 23 March – Thakur Anoop Singh, film actor and bodybuilder.
- 17 April – Sunaina, actress.
- 5 May – Raai Laxmi, actress.
- 9 May – Vijay Devarakonda, actor.
- 2 September – Ishmeet Singh Sodhi, winner Amul STAR Voice of India in 2007 (died 2008).
- 10 September
  - Manish Pandey, cricketer.
  - Catherine Tresa, actress and model.
- 12 September – Gautham Karthik, actor.
- 14 October Punam Raut, cricketer
- 20 November – Sai Dhanshika, actress.
- 21 December – Tamannaah Bhatia, actress.
- 31 December – Priya Bhavani Shankar, actress and television presenter.

== Deaths ==
- 2 January – Safdar Hashmi, Street theatre artist and activist was murdered by people linked with Indian National Congress.
- 16 January – South Indian actor Prem Nazir died.
- 1 March – Vasantdada Patil, Politician, Former Chief Minister of Maharashtra, Former Governor of Rajasthan (born 1917).
- 21 September – Abhinava Vidyatirtha, 35th Jagadguru of Sringeri Sharada Peetham (born 1917).

== See also ==
- Ayodhya dispute
- Mandal Commission
- Kashmir conflict
- Bofors scandal
