= Kotikalapudi =

Kotikalapudi (also spelled as Kotikelapudi) is a Telugu surname. Notable people with the given name include:

- Kotikalapudi Seethamma (1874–1936), Indian writer and social reformer
- Kotikalapudi Venkata Krishna Rao (1923–2016), better known as K. V. Krishna Rao, former Chief of the Indian Army
