= Coomar Narain =

Indian businessman and alleged spy (1925–2000)

- Born: 1925; Vadakkencherry, Palakkad district, Kerala, India
- Died: 20 March 2000 (aged 74–75); New Delhi, India
- Occupation: Businessman
- Employer: S. L. M. Maneklal Industries
- Known for: Coomar Narain espionage case
- Spouse: Geeta Narain

Coomar Narain (1925–2000) was an Indian businessman who became the central figure in the Coomar Narain espionage case, an espionage scandal that emerged in India in January 1985. He was accused of obtaining and passing classified Indian government information to foreign representatives through a network of government officials and intermediaries. The case involved officials associated with the Prime Minister's Office, the Ministry of Defence and other government departments.

== Early life and career ==
Coomar Narain was born in 1925 in Vadakkencherry, in present-day Palakkad district, Kerala. According to a police chargesheet cited by The Indian Express, he joined the Indian Army's Postal Service in 1943 and was discharged in 1949. He subsequently joined the Government of India as a stenographer.

After leaving government service, Narain worked for the Bombay-based S. L. M. Maneklal Industries, where he became a regional manager. He later established an office in New Delhi, at 16 Hailey Road.

According to contemporary and later accounts of the case, Narain developed contacts with government officials and was subsequently accused of obtaining classified documents through a network of officials. The allegations formed the basis of the espionage investigation that led to his arrest in January 1985.

== Espionage case ==
In January 1985, the Intelligence Bureau conducted a surveillance and investigation operation into the alleged leakage of classified government information. On 16 January, IB teams conducted simultaneous raids in New Delhi, including at the office of S. L. M. Maneklal Industries at 16 Hailey Road. Coomar Narain was arrested during the operation and was subsequently accused of leaking classified information to foreign agents. According to contemporary reporting, investigators alleged that classified documents were being obtained through a network of government officials and passed to Narain. The network included personnel associated with the Prime Minister's Office and the Ministry of Defence. The investigation subsequently led to the arrest of a number of government employees and other individuals.

An FIR was registered under the Official Secrets Act, 1923, naming Narain and several government officials. According to later accounts, the case involved officials in the Prime Minister's Office, the Ministry of Defence, the Ministry of Finance and other government establishments.

The information allegedly passed through the network included secret official codes, classified documents and reports relating to defence, shipping, transport, finance and planning, as well as reports of the Research and Analysis Wing and the Intelligence Bureau.

The investigation also alleged that members of the network had contacts with officials of foreign embassies. Contemporary and later reports identified alleged links with the French, Polish and German embassies.

== Trial and convictions ==
The investigation resulted in a lengthy criminal case involving numerous accused persons. According to The Indian Express, the prosecution presented a chargesheet of about 2,100 pages and a list of 188 witnesses.

The trial continued for approximately 17 years. In July 2002, twelve former government employees, including personnel from the Prime Minister's Office and the Rashtrapati Bhavan Secretariat, were convicted and sentenced to 10 years' imprisonment for their involvement in the espionage case. They were found guilty of passing secret official codes and classified documents to foreign agents.

Coomar Narain, regarded as the principal accused in the case, died in March 2000 before the conclusion of the trial and was therefore not sentenced.

The case became notable for the unusually long duration of the criminal proceedings and for the involvement of government employees working in sensitive offices, including the Prime Minister's Office and the Ministry of Defence.

== Later life and death ==
Following his arrest in January 1985, Coomar Narain was later released on bail. According to police records cited by The Indian Express, he subsequently purchased a farmhouse at Sainik Farms in South Delhi. Narain died on 20 March 2000, aged 75.

Narain's wife, Geeta Narain, continued to live at the farmhouse. In 2002, she was allegedly strangled inside the property by an unidentified person. Her death later became connected to a Delhi Police investigation into the ownership and inheritance of the farmhouse.

== Legacy ==
The Coomar Narain case was one of the major espionage scandals to emerge in India during the 1980s. The investigation and subsequent trial involved the alleged transfer of classified government information and the involvement of officials working in sensitive government offices, including the Prime Minister's Office and the Ministry of Defence.

The case has subsequently been examined in books and journalistic investigations. In 2024, journalist Kallol Bhattacherjee published A Singular Spy: The Untold Story of Coomar Narain, which revisited the case and attempted to reconstruct the events surrounding the espionage network.
