= Kotikalapudi Seethamma =

Indian writer and social reformer

Kotikalapudi Seetamma (1874–1936) was an Indian writer and social reformer. She was a follower of Kandukuri Veeresalingamu Pantulu. Her contributions include Ahalyabai, Sadhuraksha Satakamu, Bhaktimargamu, Satidharmamu etc. She presided over the first Telugu Women Writer's meeting called Pradhamandhra Mahilasabha in Bapatla in 1913.

She had the distinction of presiding over the women's conference held in 1913 at Bapatla on the eve of the first Andhra Conference to demand the Andhra Province. She addressed many meetings on the problem of widow remarriage. Her speeches were published under the title "Upanyasamalika" (Garland of speeches). She authored a book on higher education for women. She was a theist social reformer. She was appalled by the deplorable condition of women then obtaining in the society.
