= Boboi Singh Konthoujam =

Indian footballer

Boboi Singh
Personal information
- Full name: Boboi Singh Konthoujam
- Date of birth: 5 March 1988 (age 38)
- Place of birth: India
- Height: 1.80 m (5 ft 11 in)
- Position: Defender

Team information
- Current team: Sporting Goa

Senior career*
Years	Team	Apps	(Gls)
- Churchill Brothers
2011–	Sporting Goa	6	(0)
- * Club domestic league appearances and goals

Boboi Singh Konthoujam (Meitei: Konthoujam Boboi Singh, born 5 March 1988) is an Indian footballer who plays as a defender for Churchill Brothers and Sporting Clube de Goa in the I-League.
