= Tribeni Sahai Misra =

Indian judge

13th Governor of Assam
- In office 28 March 1984 – 15 April 1984
- Preceded by: Prakash Mehrotra
- Succeeded by: Bhishma Narain Singh

4th Governor of Meghalaya
- In office 29 March 1984 – 15 April 1984
- Preceded by: Prakash Mehrotra
- Succeeded by: Bhishma Narain Singh

Personal details
- Occupation: Jurist

Tribeni Sahai Misra (born 15 November 1922 in Mahona; died 24 October 2005 in Lucknow) was an Allahabad High Court Judge. He was later the Chief Justice of the Gauhati High Court. He was the Governor of Assam and Meghalaya.
