= Shishir Hathwar =

Indian engineer, world record holder for the fastest backwards spelling

Shishir Hathwar with his Guinness World Record certificate

Shishir Hathwar (born 27 February 1986) holds a world record for the fastest backwards spelling. He correctly spelled 50 randomly chosen words (20 six-letter words, 15 seven-letter words, 15 eight-letter words) backwards in 1 minute and 22.53 seconds, which qualified as a Guinness World Record, breaking the previous world record set by Job Pottas of Kerala, India on 12 March 2010. Pottas's time was 1 minute and 40.14 seconds. Hathwar won by over 17 seconds. Pottas performed his attempt on 12 March 2010 at the Ernakulam Press Club.

== Personal life ==
Hathwar is an electronics engineer working in Bangalore. He states that his talent of rapidly visualizing words, breaking them up into smaller words and spelling them backwards, was what resulted in his achievement. It was a YouTube clip of Pottas breaking the record that got him started on the idea he could attempt a similar feat.
