= Annies Kanmani Joy =

Indian administrator

Deputy Commissioner of Kodagu District
- Incumbent
- Assumed office 1 February 2019

Personal details
- Born: 24 May 1986 (age 40) Pampakuda, Ernakulam district, Kerala
- Education: Trivandrum Medical College (B.Sc Nursing); Lal Bahadur Shastri National Academy of Administration (M.P.Adm)

== Biography ==
Annies Kanmani Joy is an Indian administrator and former nurse who is serving as the deputy commissioner of the Kodagu district in Karnataka. She attained national recognition during the COVID-19 pandemic and is credited for containing the transmission of the virus in her district.

== Early life ==
Annies Kanmani Joy was born in the village of Pampakuda in the Ernakulam district of Kerala, to Leela and Parappalil Joy who were farmers. In her early years she had intended to become a doctor and sat for the Bachelor of Medicine, Bachelor of Surgery (MBBS) examination. She graduated with a Bachelor of Science degree in Nursing from the in 2009 and entered into a one-year internship at the Trivandrum Medical College. In 2010, she gave the Civil Services Examination for the first time, received a rank of 580 and began training for the Indian Civil Accounts Service (ICAS) at Faridabad, Haryana. In 2012, she attempted the services examination for a second time and was able to secure a rank of 65 which enabled her to join the Indian Administrative Service (IAS). For the examinations, she had also opted for psychology and Malayalam literature as her optional subjects.

In the Indian Administrative Service, she was posted as an assistant commissioner at Bidar, Karnataka and then as a civil servant at the Karnataka Bhavan in New Delhi. Following which she was posted as the chief executive officer in the Zilla Panchayat in Tumakuru, Karnataka. In 2019, she was transferred and promoted as the deputy commissioner of the Kodagu district in Karnataka. In March 2020, with the first reported instances of the COVID-19 pandemic in Karnataka, Joy had imposed an early lockdown in the district and shut down tourist spots much before the imposition of a national lockdown. During the pandemic, the district had strict containment protocols and emerged as one of the few where no cases were reported for a period of 28 consecutive days. She was credited for a successful break in transmission in the district and received national recognition as a result.

== Personal life ==
Annies is married to Stephen Mani IFs.
