= 1988 Punjab floods =

Natural disasters in Punjab in 1988

In 1988, Punjab had its most disastrous floods when all the rivers in Punjab overflowed killing and displacing thousands of people.

In four days from 22 to 26 September, 634 mm rainfall fell in Bhakra area. People lost their crops. Beas Bhakra Management Board was accused and held responsible for triggering off the flood by releasing the waters from dam which burst the banks.

B. N. Kumar, chairman of Bhakra Beas Management Board, was shot dead by revolutionaries as a revenge of Beas Bhakra Management Board's role in floods.

9,000 of Punjab's 12,989 villages were flooded, of which over 2,500 were completely marooned or simply washed away. This was the biggest flood in Punjab's history as it disrupted the lives of over 34 lakh people. As people were trying to survive and manage, the Union Agriculture Minister Bhajan Lai infamously said that the floods were a blessing in disguise - his logic being that it would increase Punjab's ground water level.
