= Shadow of the Almighty Faith Tabernacle Ministries =

Christian church in India

- Founded: 1998
- Founder: Rev. Paul D Dawson
- Type: Non-government organisation
- Purpose: Well-being of all people, Evangelical
- Location: Chennai, TN - India
- Region served: INDIA
- Key people: Rev. Paul D Dawson (founder)

Shadow of the Almighty Faith Tabernacle Ministries (SAFTM) is a Christian church in India.

== History ==
SAFTM was founded in 1998 by Rev. Paul D Dawson, who resigned his job as a senior executive in one of the Government of India's leading insurance companies after receiving the call for full-time ministry. After the inception of the SAFT Church, he now ministers with the main objective of teaching people about Faith & equipping them with knowledge of the supernatural resources on the Word of God, so that believers may experience the love of Christ. Alongside his wife Pas Priscilla Dawson, they continue to carry on their divine calling each day.

== Organization Information ==
Shadow of the Almighty Faith Tabernacle Church ( SAFT Church ), is a church that strongly believes in preparing believers for eternity, and is expressed in every aspect of all its services. Special emphasis is laid on teaching the Word of God in its fullest perspective, so that the believer may lead a Victorious, Supernatural and complete life.
