= Official Secrets Act, 1923 (India) =

Anti-espionage legislation

Imperial Legislative Council
- Long title: An Act to consolidate and amend the law relating to official secrets.
- Citation: Act No. 19 of 1923
- Territorial extent: British India

Amended by
- Repealing Act, 1927
- Status: In force

The Official Secrets Act, 1923 (No. 19) is India's anti-espionage act held over from the British Raj period. It states clearly that actions which involve helping an enemy state against India are strongly condemned. It also states that one cannot approach, inspect, or even pass over a prohibited government site or area like an electrical substation. According to this act, helping the enemy state can be in the form of communicating a sketch, plan, model of an official secret, or of official codes or passwords, to the enemy.

== Prosecution and penalties ==
Punishments under the Act range from three years to life imprisonment (if the intent is to declare war against India - section 5). A person prosecuted under this Act can be charged with the crime even if the action was unintentional and not intended to endanger the security of the state. The Act only empowers persons in positions of authority to handle official secrets, and others who handle it in prohibited areas or outside them are liable for punishment.

Journalists have to help members of the police forces above the rank of the sub-Inspector and members of the military with investigations regarding an offense, up to and including revealing his sources of information.

Under the Act, search warrants may be issued at any time if the magistrate determines that based on the evidence there is enough danger to the security of the state.

Uninterested members of the public may be excluded from court proceedings if the prosecution feels that any information which is going to be passed on during the proceedings is sensitive. This also includes media.

When a company is seen as the offender under this Act, everyone involved with the management of the company, including the board of directors, can be liable for punishment. In the case of a newspaper, everyone – including the editor, publisher and the proprietor — can be imprisoned for an offense. OSA is controversial to the modern RTI Act of 2005.

== Criticism ==
=== Conflict with right to information ===
In the OSA clause 6, information from any governmental office is considered official information, hence it can be used to override Right to Information Act 2005 requests. This has drawn harsh criticism. The Supreme Court of India has also held that the RTI overrides OSA.

=== Iftikhar Gilani case ===
In June 2002, journalist Iftikhar Gilani was, arrested for violating the OSA 1923. He was charged under the OSA, with a case under the Obscenity Act added to it. The first military report suggested that the information he was accused of holding was "secret" despite being publicly available. The second military intelligence report contradicted this, stating that there was no "official secret". Even after this, the government denied the opinion of the military and was on the verge of challenging it when the contradictions were exposed in the press.

The military reported that "the information contained in the document is easily available" and "the documents carry no security classified information and the information seems to have been gathered from open sources".

On 13 January 2004, the government withdrew its case against him to prevent two of its ministries from having to give contradictory opinions. Gilani was released the same month.

== Reforms ==
After reviewing the provisions of the act, the Union Home Ministry in July 2017 submitted a report to the Cabinet secretariat. The goal was to amend the act to make it more transparent and in line with the Right to Information Act, 2005.

== Recent News ==
=== Delhi court judgement in the case involving journalist Santanu Saikia ===
A Delhi court in a 2009 judgement, in a case involving the publication of excerpts of a cabinet note in the Financial Express ten years earlier by Santanu Saikia, greatly reduced the powers of the act by ruling publication of a document merely labelled "secret" shall not render the journalist liable under the law.

Saikia was arrested in February 2015 in another case that the police said involved the writing of stories and analyses from documents allegedly stolen from the government. He was released on bail in May after spending 80 days in jail.

=== 50 cases of Official Secrets Act violation since 2014 ===
50 cases of violation of the Official Secrets Act were registered in the country since 2014. Of these 50 cases, 30 were registered in 2016, nine in 2015 and 11 in 2014 according to Union Minister of state for Home Hansraj Ahir. Of the 30 cases registered in 2016, eight were lodged in Tamil Nadu, followed by five each in Punjab and Uttar Pradesh.

=== Rafale fighter jets case details published by The Hindu newspaper 2019 ===
Attorney General KK Venugopal told the three-judge bench that the government could invoke the Official Secrets Act 1923, against The Hindu newspaper, which had published the papers. He claimed that the documents pertaining to the purchase of Rafale jets published by the media are genuine Justice Joseph, one of the three judges on the bench, asked the government about section 22 of the Right to Information Act 2005 having an overriding effect on the Official Secrets Act and also section 24 which mandates even security and intelligence organisations to disclose information on corruption and human rights violations. Finally, section 8(2) compels the government to disclose information "if public interest in disclosure outweighs the harm to protected interest".

- Right to Information Act
- Classified information
- Official Secrets Act
