= Hari Anand Barari =

Indian Intelligence Bureau director and governor of Haryana

Hari Anand Barari IPS (Retd.)

Governor of Haryana
- In office 22 February 1988 – 6 February 1990
- Chief Minister: Devi Lal; Om Prakash Chautala
- Preceded by: S. M. H. Burney
- Succeeded by: Dhanik Lal Mandal

Director of the Intelligence Bureau
- In office November 1984 – March 1987
- Preceded by: R. K. Kapoor
- Succeeded by: M. K. Narayanan

Personal details
- Born: 1 April 1929 Bikrampur, Bengal Presidency, British India (now Bikrampur, Bangladesh)
- Died: 10 January 2016 (aged 86)
- Education: University of Calcutta

Hari Anand Barari (1 April 1929 – 10 January 2016) was an Indian Intelligence Bureau officer who served as its director between November 1984 and March 1987. Upon his retirement from the service, he was appointed as the Governor of Haryana on 22 February 1988 and remained in office till 6 February 1990. He was born in Bikrampur in 1929. Barari died on 10 January 2016, at the age of 86.

== See also ==
- List of governors of Haryana
