= Ashoknath Banerji =

Indian politician

Ashoknath N. Banerji

Governor of Karnataka
- In office 16 April 1983 – 25 February 1988
- President: Zail Singh; Ramaswamy Venkataraman
- Prime Minister: Indira Gandhi; Rajiv Gandhi
- Chief Minister: Ramakrishna Hegde

Governor of Himachal Pradesh
- In office 26 August 1981 – 15 April 1983
- President: Neelam Sanjiva Reddy
- Prime Minister: Indira Gandhi
- Chief Minister: Thakur Ram Lal

Personal details
- Born: 7 October 1929
- Died: 2006

Ashoknath N. Banerji (7 October 1929 – 2006) was an Indian politician who was the Governor of Karnataka, India from 16 April 1983 to 25 February 1988. Banerji was a bureaucrat from the Indian Administrative Service. Banerji died in 2006.

== See also ==
- List of governors of Karnataka
