= Bhishma Narain Singh =

Indian politician (1933–2018)

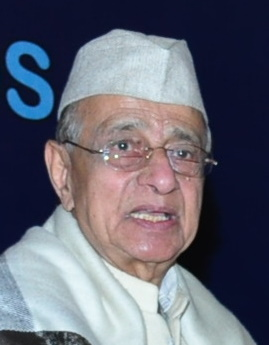

Governor of Tamil Nadu
- In office 15 February 1991 – 30 May 1993
- Chief Minister: J. Jayalalithaa
- Preceded by: Surjit Singh Barnala
- Succeeded by: Marri Chenna Reddy

Governor of Assam
- In office 15 April 1984 – 10 May 1989
- Chief Minister: Hiteswar Saikia; Prafulla Kumar Mahanta
- Preceded by: T. S. Mishra
- Succeeded by: Harideo Joshi

Personal details
- Born: 13 July 1933 Udaigarh
- Died: 9 September 2018 (aged 85)
- Party: Indian National Congress
- Children: 4 (late Prem Shankar Singh & Uma Shankar Singh, Sushma Singh & Saroj Singh)

Bhishma Narain Singh (13 July 1933 – 1 August 2018) was an Indian politician who served as the Governor of Assam from 15 April 1984 to 10 May 1989 and was the Governor of Tamil Nadu between 15 February 1991 and 30 May 1993.

== Life ==
Singh was born in a village in Jharkhand (Udaigarh, Palamu District) on 13 July 1933 and graduated from Banaras Hindu University. He was a member of All India Congress Committee (AICC) for more than three decades and was a permanent invitee of the Congress Parliamentary Board from 1978 to 1983 under the Presidency of Mrs. Indira Gandhi. Currently, his grandson Kranti Pratap Singh is an active politician from Hussainabad. Notable positions he has held include:

- 1967: Member of Legislative Assembly of Bihar State
- 1971: Bihar State Minister for Education
- 1972: Bihar State Minister for Mines & Geology
- 1973: Bihar State Minister for Food, Supply & Commerce
- 1976: Elected to Rajya Sabha (Upper House of Indian Parliament)
- 1978: Chief Whip of Congress Party in Parliament
- 1980: Cabinet Minister of Parliamentary Affairs, Works and Housing & labor and Communications in Mrs. Indira Gandhi's Government
- 1983: Cabinet Minister for Food and Civil Supplies in Mrs. Indira Gandhi's Prime Ministership
- 1984: Governor of Assam & Meghalaya and Chairman of North Eastern Council; additional charge as Governor of Sikkim in 1985 and Arunachal Pradesh in 1987
- 1991: Governor of Tamil Nadu along with additional charge of Pondicherry and Andaman and Nicobar Islands

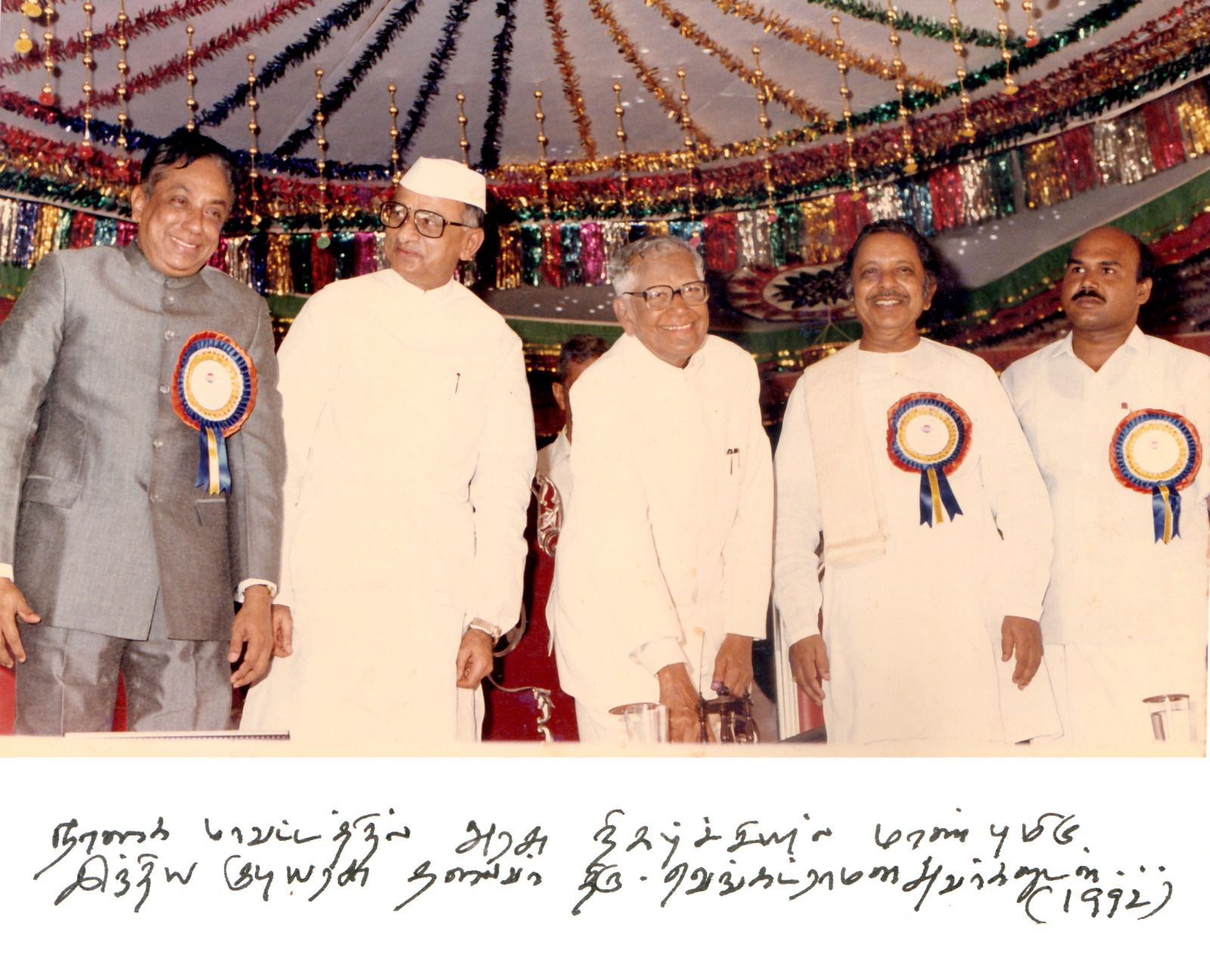
Bhisma Narain Singh along with President R. Venkatraman in a government function

Services rendered to the nation include:

- As Governor of Tamil Nadu in President's Rule he restored critical law and order and maintained the functioning of democratic institutions, while also focusing on efforts to improve the state's economic conditions.
- As chairman of North Eastern Council he covered the administration of the seven sisters Northeast Indian States (namely Assam, Manipur, Tripura, Mizoram, Nagaland, Meghalaya & Arunachal Pradesh). During this time, efforts were made to accelerate economic and social development, contributing to a transformation in the region's profile and aiming to improve the quality of life for its residents. Social reforms and initiatives for tribal welfare were also implemented.
- In Assam as governor, he pacified the social & political agitations and factions, leading to the signing of the Historic Assam Accord between the Central & State Governments and Assam Students' Union (conflict resolution).
- As Cabinet Minister Works & Housing, he was involved with the establishment of sports infrastructure for holding the IX Asian Games in New Delhi, and ensuring its completion in record time (1980–1982).
- As governor of several states in India, he served as the chancellor of over two dozen universities. He ensured qualitative improvements in education and related facilities and promoted women's rights.

He has been a member of the following organizations:

- Associate Life Member of the Inter Parliamentary Union, Indian Branch
- Associate Life Member of the Commonwealth Parliamentary Association in India
- President of Unity International Foundation
- President of All India Conference of Intellectuals

== Awards ==
He was the recipient of several national and international awards, including the Medal of Merit and Certificate of Honoured by the Government of Algeria in April, 2005 and most recently receiving the highest Award of Russian Federation "Order of Friendship" in April 2009.

Singh travelled widely throughout Asia, Europe, some African countries and the US. He personally enjoyed brisk morning walks, horse riding and tribal folk place.

During his time as a politician, he took part in numerous events on diplomatic visits to other countries:

- He visited foreign countries on invitation after demitting office as governor.
- He visited Macedonia on the invitation of the Vice President of the Assembly Mr. Kiro Popovski in April 1994.
- He visited Yugoslavia on the invitation of the President of the Chamber of Citizens of the Federal Assembly of the Republic of Yugoslavia Dr. Radoman Božović in July 1994.
- He visited Bahrain in February 1996 on the special invitation of the Government of Bahrain to attend NRI's Conference.
- In May 1998 he visited Kazakhstan on the invitation of the President of Kazakhstan.
- He was invited to attend the World Bhojpuri Conference as a Special Guest held in Mauritius in February 2000.
- He visited Yugoslavia as international observer to monitor the election of the President, XXXX Federal Assembly and the bodies of local self - rule of Serbia scheduled for 24 September 2000 onwards on the invitation of the Chairman of the Foreign Affairs Committee.
- He visited China on the invitation of the External Cultural Relations of Ministry of Culture People's Republic of China in May 2001.
- He visited Bhutan on the invitation of the Govt. of Bhutan through the Ambassador of Bhutan in New Delhi in September 2002.
- He visited China on the invitation of the Chinese People's Association for Friendship with Foreign Countries in May 2004.
- He visited Seoul, South Korea on the invitation of the International Federation of Agricultural Producers (IFAP) in May 2006.
- He visited UK on the invitation of the NRI's Society London Chapter and addressed the NRI's in October 2006.
- He visited Stuttgart (Germany) on the invitation of the Mercedes Benz Museum Asia Circle as Chief Guest and addressed 300 delegates on India's rich cultural heritage of religious tolerance in 2007.
- He visited UK on the invitation of the British Institute of Technology & E-commerce in October 2008.
- He visited Moscow on the invitation of the Government of Russia to attend a public dialogue on 18 November 2009.
