= S. M. H. Burney =

Indian civil servant

Sayed Muzaffar Hussain Burney

Chancellor of Jamia Millia Islamia
- In office 1990–1995
- Vice-Chancellor: Syed Zahoor Qasim; Bashiruddin Ahmad
- Preceded by: Khurshed Alam Khan
- Succeeded by: Khurshed Alam Khan

Governor of Haryana
- In office 14 June 1984 – 21 February 1988
- Appointed by: Zail Singh
- Chief Minister: Bhajan Lal Bishnoi
- Preceded by: Ganpatrao Devji Tapase
- Succeeded by: Hari Anand Barari

Governor of Himachal Pradesh
- Additional charge
- In office 2 December 1987 – 10 January 1988
- Appointed by: Ramaswamy Venkataraman
- Chief Minister: Virbhadra Singh
- Preceded by: Rustom K. S. Ghandhi
- Succeeded by: Rustom K. S. Ghandhi

Governor of Nagaland
- In office 10 August 1981 – 12 June 1984
- Appointed by: Neelam Sanjiva Reddy
- Chief Ministers: John Bosco Jasokie; S. C. Jamir
- Preceded by: Lallan Prasad Singh
- Succeeded by: K. V. Krishna Rao

Governor of Tripura
- In office 14 August 1981 – 13 June 1984
- Appointed by: Neelam Sanjiva Reddy
- Chief Minister: Nripen Chakraborty
- Preceded by: Lallan Prasad Singh
- Succeeded by: K. V. Krishna Rao

Governor of Manipur
- In office 18 August 1981 – 11 June 1984
- Appointed by: Neelam Sanjiva Reddy
- Chief Minister: Rishang Keishing
- Preceded by: Lallan Prasad Singh
- Succeeded by: K. V. Krishna Rao

Union Home Secretary
- In office 29 February 1980 – 12 August 1981
- Preceded by: T. C. A. Srinivasavaradan
- Succeeded by: T. N. Chaturvedi

Personal details
- Born: 14 August 1924
- Died: 7 February 2014 (aged 89)

Sayed Muzaffar Hussain Burney (14 August 1924 – 7 February 2014) was a civil servant, governor of the states of Tripura, Nagaland, Haryana and Himachal Pradesh and a chairman of the National Minorities Commission.

Burney was an alumnus of the Bareilly College in Uttar Pradesh. He was an officer of the Indian Administrative Service of the Orissa cadre where he went on to become the chief secretary of the state. He served as Home Secretary to the Government of India from February 1980 to August 1981. Between 1981 and 1984, he served as the governor of Nagaland, Tripura and Manipur and from 1987 to 1988, as the Governor of Himachal Pradesh and Haryana. He was also a member and later chairman of the Fourth and Fifth Minority Commissions from 1988 to 1992 and was the chancellor of the Jamia Millia Islamia University in Delhi from 1990 to 1995.

Burney authored the work Iqbal: Poet – Patriot of India.
