= List of governors of Himachal Pradesh =

Governors of state of Himachal Pradesh in India

Governor of Himachal Pradesh
- Emblem of Himachal Pradesh

- Flag of India

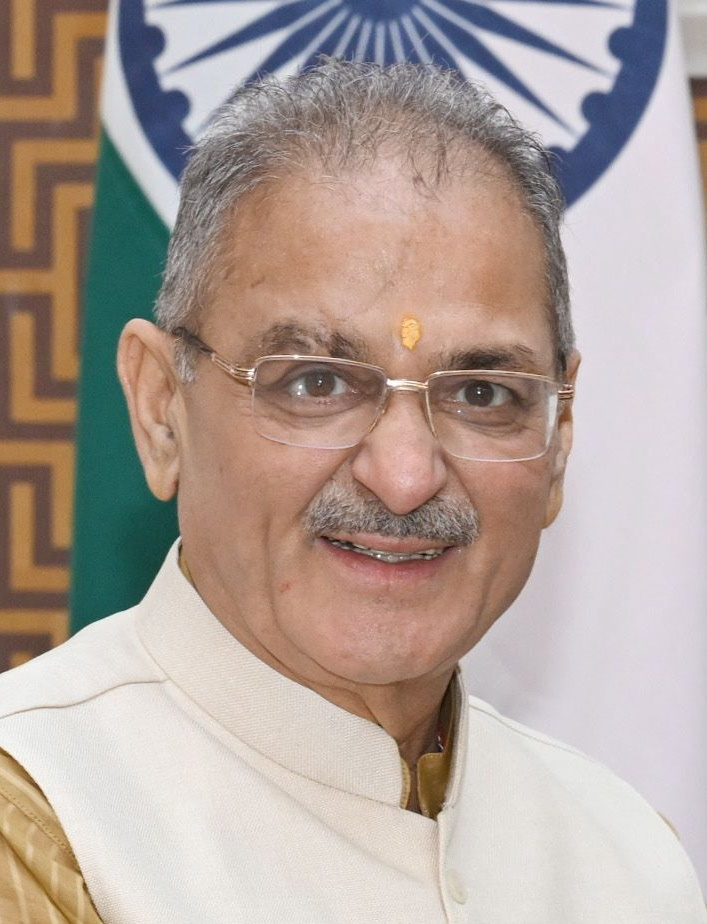
- Incumbent; Kavinder Gupta since 10 March 2026
- Style: His Excellency
- Residence: Lok Bhavan; Shimla
- Appointer: President of India
- Term length: At the pleasure of the president
- Inaugural holder: S. Chakravarti
- Formation: 25 January 1971; 55 years ago
- Website: https://himachalrajbhavan.nic.in

The governor of Himachal Pradesh (ISO: Himachal Pradēśa kē Rājyapāla) is the constitutional head of the Indian state of Himachal Pradesh. Kavinder Gupta is the 32nd of Himachal Pradesh since 10th March 2026.

Out of the 32 governors (except the present one) of the state only three have been able to complete their full terms: S. Chakravarti (1971–77), Vishnu Sadashiv Kokje (2003–08) and Urmila Singh (2010–15).

== Lieutenant Governors ==
#	Portrait	Name (born – died)	Took office	Left office	Duration
1		Maj. Gen. K. S. Himmatsinhji Jadeja (Retd.) (1897–1973)	1 March 1952	31 December 1954	2 years, 305 days
2		Rai Bajrang Bahadur Singh (1906–1973)	1 January 1955	13 August 1963	8 years, 224 days
3		Bhagawan Sahay (1905–1986)	14 August 1963	25 February 1966	2 years, 195 days
4		ICS V. Viswanathan (Retd) (1909–1987)	26 February 1966	6 May 1967	1 year, 69 days
5		Om Parkash	7 May 1967	15 May 1967	8 days
6		Lt. Gen. Kanwar Bahadur Singh (Retd.) (1910–2007)	16 May 1967	24 January 1971	3 years, 253 days

== Governors ==
Legend

- ^{†} Died in office
- ^{§} Transferred
- ^{‡} Resigned/removed

Color key

- indicates acting/additional charge

#	Portrait	Name (born – died)	Home state	Tenure in office			Appointer (President)
#	Portrait	Name (born – died)	Home state	From	To	Time in office	Appointer (President)
1		S. Chakravarti; ICS (Retd)	–	25 January 1971	16 February 1977	6 years, 22 days	V. V. Giri
2		Amin ud-din Ahmad Khan (1911–1983)	Rajasthan	17 February 1977	25 August 1981	4 years, 189 days	Fakhruddin Ali Ahmed
3		Ashoknath Banerji; IAS (Retd) (1929–2006)	West Bengal	26 August 1981	15 April 1983	1 year, 232 days	Neelam Sanjiva Reddy
4		Hokishe Sema (1921–2007)	Nagaland	16 April 1983	7 March 1986^{[‡]}	2 years, 325 days	Zail Singh
5		Justice; Prabodh Dinkarrao Desai (1930–2004); Chief Justice, Himachal Pradesh High Court (Acting)	Gujarat	8 March 1986	16 April 1986	39 days	Zail Singh
6		Vice Admiral; Rustom K. S. Ghandhi (Retd); PVSM VrC (1924–2014)	Maharashtra	17 April 1986	2 December 1987	1 year, 229 days	Zail Singh
7		S. M. H. Burney; IAS (Retd) (1924–2014); Governor of Haryana (Acting)	Uttar Pradesh	2 December 1987	10 January 1988	39 days	Ramaswamy Venkataraman
(6)		Vice Admiral; Rustom K. S. Ghandhi (Retd); PVSM VrC (1924–2014)	Maharashtra	11 January 1988	20 December 1989	1 year, 343 days	Ramaswamy Venkataraman
8		Hari Anand Barari; IPS (Retd) (1924–2014); Governor of Haryana (Acting)	West Bengal	20 December 1989	12 January 1990	23 days	Ramaswamy Venkataraman
(6)		Vice Admiral; Rustom K. S. Ghandhi (Retd); PVSM VrC (1924–2014)	Maharashtra	13 January 1990	15 February 1990	33 days	Ramaswamy Venkataraman
9		B. Rachaiah (1922–2000)	Karnataka	16 February 1990	19 December 1990^{[§]} (Note: Transferred as the Governor of Kerala)	306 days	Ramaswamy Venkataraman
10		Virendra Verma (1916–2009)	Uttar Pradesh	20 December 1990	29 January 1993	2 years, 40 days	Ramaswamy Venkataraman
11		Surendra Nath; IPS (Retd) (1926–1994); Governor of Punjab (Additional Charge)	National Capital Territory of Delhi	30 January 1993	10 December 1993	314 days	Shankar Dayal Sharma
12		Bali Ram Bhagat (1922–2011)	Bihar	11 February 1993	29 June 1993^{[§]} (Note: Transferred as the Governor of Rajasthan)	138 days	Shankar Dayal Sharma
13		Gulsher Ahmed (1921–2002)	Madhya Pradesh	30 June 1993	26 November 1993^{[‡]}	149 days	Shankar Dayal Sharma
(11)		Surendra Nath; IPS (Retd) (1926–1994) (Additional charge)	National Capital Territory of Delhi	27 November 1993	9 July 1994^{[†]}	224 days	Shankar Dayal Sharma
14		Justice; Viswanathan Ratnam (1932–2020); Chief Justice, Himachal Pradesh High Court (Acting)	Tamil Nadu	10 July 1994	30 July 1994	20 days	Shankar Dayal Sharma
15		Sudhakarrao Naik (1934–2001)	Maharashtra	30 July 1994	17 September 1995^{[‡]}	1 year, 49 days	Shankar Dayal Sharma
16		Mahabir Prasad (1939–2010); Governor of Haryana (Additional Charge)	Uttar Pradesh	18 September 1995	17 November 1995	60 days	Shankar Dayal Sharma
17		Sheila Kaul (1915–2025)	Uttar Pradesh	17 November 1995	23 April 1996^{[‡]}	158 days	Shankar Dayal Sharma
(16)		Mahabir Prasad (1939–2010); Governor of Haryana (Additional Charge)	Uttar Pradesh	23 April 1996	25 July 1997	1 year, 93 days	Shankar Dayal Sharma
18		V. S. Ramadevi; IAS (Retd) (1934–2013)	Andhra Pradesh	26 July 1997	1 December 1999^{[§]} (Note: Transferred as the Governor of Karnataka)	2 years, 128 days	Shankar Dayal Sharma
19		Vishnu Kant Shastri (1929–2005)	West Bengal	2 December 1999	23 November 2000^{[§]} (Note: Transferred as the Governor of Uttar Pradesh)	357 days	K. R. Narayanan
20		Suraj Bhan (1928–2006)	Haryana	23 November 2000	7 May 2003	2 years, 165 days	K. R. Narayanan
21		Justice (Retd); Vishnu Sadashiv Kokje (born 1939)	Madhya Pradesh	8 May 2003	19 July 2008	5 years, 72 days	A. P. J. Abdul Kalam
22		Prabha Rau (1935–2010)	Maharashtra	19 July 2008	24 January 2010^{[§]}	1 year, 189 days	Pratibha Patil
23		Urmila Singh (1946–2018)	Madhya Pradesh	25 January 2010	28 January 2015	5 years, 3 days	Pratibha Patil
24		Kalyan Singh (1932–2021); Governor of Rajasthan (Additional Charge)	Uttar Pradesh	28 January 2015	12 August 2015	196 days	Pranab Mukherjee
25		Acharya Dev Vrat (born 1959)	Haryana	12 August 2015	21 July 2019^{[§]} (Note: Transferred as the Governor of Gujarat)	3 years, 343 days	Pranab Mukherjee
26		Kalraj Mishra (born 1941)	Uttar Pradesh	21 July 2019	10 September 2019^{[§]}	51 days	Ramnath Kovind
27		Bandaru Dattatreya (born 1947)	Telangana	11 September 2019	13 July 2021^{[§]} (Note: Transferred as the Governor of Haryana)	1 year, 305 days	Ramnath Kovind
28		Rajendra Arlekar (born 1954)	Goa	13 July 2021	20 February 2023^{[§]} (Note: Transferred as the Governor of Bihar)	1 year, 222 days	Ramnath Kovind
29		Shiv Pratap Shukla (born 1952)	Uttar Pradesh	20 February 2023	11 March 2026^{[§]} (Note: Transferred as the Governor of Telangana)	3 years, 19 days	Droupadi Murmu
30		Kavinder Gupta (born 1960)	Jammu and Kashmir	10 March 2026	Incumbent	217 days	Droupadi Murmu

== Oath ==
                      Main, [Name], Ishwar ki shapath leta hoon (ya nishtha se pratigya karta hoon) ki main sachhe mann se Governor (Rajyapal) ke roop mein [State Name] ke pad ka karyabhar sambhalunga (ya zimmedari uthaunga). Main apni poori kabiliyat se Samvidhan (Constitution) aur kanoon (Law) ki raksha, suraksha aur bachaav karunga, aur main apne aap ko [State Name] ki janta ki seva aur kalyan (well-being) mein samarpit karunga."

== See also ==
- Himachal Pradesh
- Governors of India
- Chief Minister of Himachal Pradesh
- Government of Himachal Pradesh
