= Sundar Lal Khurana =

Indian bureaucrat

- Born: 10 November 1918; New Delhi, India
- Died: c. September 2007 (aged 88)

Sundar Lal Khurana (10 November 1918 – c. September 2007), often shortened as S. L. Khurana, was an Indian bureaucrat who served as the Lieutenant Governor of Delhi from 1981 to 1982, Lieutenant Governor of Pondicherry in 1984 and the Governor of Tamil Nadu from 1982 to 1988. He was a member of the Indian Administrative Service (IAS) and served as Union Home Secretary. Khurana's death was announced in the Delhi Legislative Assembly in September 2007.
