= K. V. Krishna Rao =

Indian military officer and governor (1923–2016)

General K. V. Krishna Rao PVSM
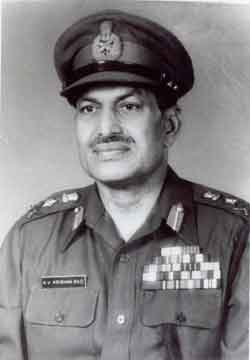

6th Governor of Jammu and Kashmir
- In office 12 March 1993 – 2 May 1999
- President: Shankar Dayal Sharma
- Chief Minister: Farooq Abdullah
- Preceded by: Girish Chandra Saxena
- Succeeded by: Girish Chandra Saxena
- In office July 1989 – 19 January 1990
- President: R. Venkataraman
- Chief Minister: Farooq Abdullah
- Preceded by: Jagmohan Malhotra
- Succeeded by: Jagmohan Malhotra

4th Governor of Manipur
- In office 2 June 1984 – 7 July 1989
- President: Zail Singh
- Chief Minister: Rishang Keishing; Rajkumar Jaichandra Singh
- Preceded by: S. M. H. Burney
- Succeeded by: Chintamani Panigrahi

5th Governor of Nagaland
- In office 13 June 1984 – 19 July 1989
- President: Zail Singh
- Chief Minister: S. C. Jamir; Hokishe Sema
- Preceded by: S. M. H. Burney
- Succeeded by: Gopal Singh

4th Governor of Tripura
- In office 14 June 1984 – 11 July 1989
- President: Zail Singh
- Chief Minister: Nripen Chakraborty; Sudhir Ranjan Majumdar
- Preceded by: S. M. H. Burney
- Succeeded by: Sultan Singh

Governor of Mizoram (Additional Charge)
- In office 1 May 1989 – 20 July 1989
- President: R. Venkataraman
- Chief Minister: Lal Thanhawla
- Preceded by: Hiteswar Saikia
- Succeeded by: Williamson A. Sangma

24th Chairman of the Chiefs of Staff Committee
- In office 1 March 1982 – 31 July 1983
- President: Neelam Sanjiva Reddy; Zail Singh
- Prime Minister: Indira Gandhi
- Preceded by: Ronald Lynsdale Pereira
- Succeeded by: Dilbagh Singh

11th Chief of the Army Staff
- In office 1 June 1981 – 31 July 1983
- President: Neelam Sanjiva Reddy; Zail Singh
- Prime Minister: Indira Gandhi
- Preceded by: O. P. Malhotra
- Succeeded by: A. S. Vaidya

Personal details
- Born: 16 July 1923 Vizianagaram, Madras Presidency, British India
- Died: 30 January 2016 (aged 92) New Delhi, India
- Spouse: K. Radha Rao
- Children: 2, including K. V. L. Narayan

Military service
- Allegiance: British India; India
- Branch: British Indian Army; Indian Army
- Service years: 1942–1983
- Rank: General
- Unit: 2 Mahar Regiment
- Commands: Western Army; XVI Corps; 8 Mountain Division; 26 Division; 114 Infantry Brigade; 3 Mahar
- Conflicts: World War II; Burma campaign; Indo-Pakistani war of 1971; Battle of Sylhet
- Awards: Param Vishisht Seva
- S/N: IEC-8139 (emergency commission); IC-1164 (regular commission)

General Kotikalapudi Venkata Krishna Rao, PVSM (16 July 1923 – 30 January 2016) was a former chief of the Indian Army and a former governor of Jammu and Kashmir, Nagaland, Manipur and Tripura.

Gen. Rao was commissioned into the Indian Army in 1942. During the 1971 war, Z Force commander Lt. Col. Ziaur Rahman and Gen. Rao’s 8th Mountain Division captured the Sylhet region and helped liberate northeastern Bangladesh. He was the Chief of the Army Staff in 1983 and was appointed Governor of Nagaland, Manipur and Tripura in June 1984. He was Governor of Jammu and Kashmir for the first time from 11 July 1989 to 19 January 1990 and the second time from 13 March 1993 till 2 May 1998.

== Early life ==
Gen K. V. Krishna Rao was born on 16 July 1923 in a Telugu Brahmin family based in Vijayawada, the son of Sri K.S.Narayan Rao and his wife, Smt.K.Lakshmi Amma. He graduated from the Maharajah's College, Vizianagaram.

== Military career ==
=== World War II ===
He received an emergency commission as a second lieutenant in the 2nd battalion of the Mahar Regiment on 9 August 1942. As a young officer, he served in Burma, North West Frontier and Baluchistan during the Second World War. During the extensive Punjab disturbances in 1947, he served both in East and West Punjab.

=== Post-Independence ===
He participated in the first war against Pakistan in Jammu and Kashmir in 1947–48. He was a founder instructor of the National Defence Academy during 1949–51. In May 1951, he was selected to attend the Defence Services Staff College (DSSC), Wellington. After graduating from DSSC, he was appointed general staff officer grade 2 (GSO2) in the army headquarters, where he served till 1955. Selected for the command of a battalion, he commanded the 3rd Battalion The Mahar Regiment in Jammu and Kashmir during 1956–59. Thereafter, he served as a general staff officer grade-1 (GSO1) of a division in the Jammu Region during 1960–63. He was a member of the faculty of the Defence Services Staff College during 1963–65. On 15 March 1965, by then a lieutenant-colonel, he was promoted to acting brigadier and given command of the 114 Infantry Brigade in the forward area of Ladakh during 1965–66, when he dealt with both Chinese and Pakistani threats. He was selected to attend the Imperial Defence College (now Royal College of Defence Studies (RCDS)), London in 1967–68. He visited Europe, US, Canada and USSR on training assignments. On return to India, he was promoted to substantive brigadier on 5 January 1968 and was appointed deputy director military operations at army headquarters on 13 February, serving through 1968–69.

On 29 June 1969, he was promoted to the acting rank of major general and commanded the 26 Infantry Division in the Jammu Region during 1969–70, with promotion to substantive major-general on 4 August 1970. Thereafter, he commanded the 8 Mountain Division engaged in counterinsurgency operations in Nagaland and Manipur during 1970–72. During this period, his division also participated in the Indo-Pakistani War of 1971. His division captured the Sylhet Area and liberated North East Bangladesh.

He was awarded the Param Vishist Seva Medal (the award for distinguished services of the most exceptional order) for displaying outstanding leadership, courage, determination and drive during this War. Gen Rao then moved to Western Sector upon his appointment on 1 June 1972 as chief of staff, Western Command. He served in this role from 1972 to 1974, during which period disengagement with Pakistani troops was carried out and fresh plans were made against likely adventures by Pakistan.

On 2 August 1974, Krishna Rao was promoted to the rank of lieutenant general and took over command of the largest corps (XVI Corps) in the Jammu Region. In addition, during 1975–76, he was also the chairman of the expert committee constituted by the government on re-organisation and modernisation for future defence of the country. Later, he served as deputy chief of army staff at army headquarters during 1978–79.

Subsequently, he was promoted to army commander and served as general officer commanding-in-chief Western Command, then based in Shimla during 1979–81.

=== Chief of army staff ===
General Krishna Rao was appointed chief of army staff on 1 June 1981, and served in that capacity till July 1983. He was also chairman of the chiefs of staff committee, the highest appointment in the services, during March 1982 – July 1983. His services and leadership were warmly appreciated by the prime minister and the government.

During his service, General Krishna Rao also held numerous other responsibilities. He was colonel of the Mahar Regiment during 1968–83. As chief of army staff, he was also colonel of 61 Cavalry, honorary colonel of the Mechanised Infantry Regiment and the Brigade of the Guards and colonel-in-chief of the National Cadet Corps. After relinquishing colonelcy of the Mahar Regiment, he was appointed honorary colonel of the regiment. He was made honorary general of the Royal Nepalese Army (Now Nepalese Army). He was principal honorary army ADC to the president. He was president of Equestrian Federation of India and deputy chairman of the special organising committee of the 1982 Asian Games. He was patron of the Indian Ex-Services League, United Service Institution of India and National Adventure Foundation.

Gen. Krishna Rao retired from service on 31 July 1983.

=== Progenitor of the "Cold Start" military doctrine ===
Gen Krishna Rao is credited with coming up with a unique military doctrine, now recognized and termed as 'Cold Start', during India's clashes with Pakistan, when the delay in political decision making resulted in constraining the mobilization of India's military actions. At the core of this doctrine is the initiation of swift, immediate, multiple strikes to counter and contain the enemy nation's aggression, in the interest of safety of the nation, without losing time and strategic advantage due to possible delays in political decisions owing to various domestic and international factors.

== Gubernatorial assignments ==
From June 1984 to July 1989, General Krishna Rao was the governor of the North Eastern States of Nagaland, Manipur and Tripura. He was also the governor of Mizoram in June 1988 and March to July 1989. He was chancellor of the Manipur and Tripura Universities. He was chairman of the North East Zone Culture Centre. In his capacity of governor of the North Eastern States, he ensured that peace was brought about and maintained, and that the Tripura Agreement was concluded.

General Krishna Rao was the governor of Jammu and Kashmir during 1989–90. As the governor, he was chancellor of the University of Kashmir, University of Jammu and the Sher-e-Kashmir University of Agricultural Sciences and Technology of Kashmir. He was also chairman of Shri Mata Vaishno Devi Shrine Board. When a proxy war developed in Jammu and Kashmir and reached its peak, he was reappointed governor and served there from 12 March 1993 to 1 May 1998. In this capacity, he was instrumental in restoring peace and democracy in the insurgency-riven state after a long gap of seven years.

== Personal life ==
He was married to K. Radha Rao and has one son, Narayan and one daughter, Lalitha. His son, K V Narayan Rao, was CEO of the media house NDTV; he died in November 2017 after battling cancer, and within 2 years after his father's death in early 2016.

General Krishna Rao was conferred the honorary doctorate of D.Litt. (honoris causa) by the Andhra University, Doctor of Laws (honoris causa) by Sri Venkateswara University and Doctor of Letters (D.Litt.) (honoris causa) by the Telugu University.

He was a Life Member of the India International Centre, New Delhi, National Sports Club of India, New Delhi, Defence Services Officers Institute, New Delhi, Bharatiya Vidya Bhavan, Mumbai, Divine Life Society and Secunderabad Club. He played cricket and golf. His hobbies included photography, gardening and social welfare.

General Krishna Rao died on Martyr's Day, 30 January 2016 in New Delhi.

== Books published ==
- 1991 – Prepare or Perish – A Study of National Security – (Lancer Publishers, New Delhi)
- 2001 – In the Service of the Nation – Reminiscences – (Penguin Books Ltd.)
- 2011 – Invincibility, challenges and Leadership – (Orient Black Swan Ltd.)

== Honours and awards ==

Param Vishisht Seva Medal		General Service Medal 1947	
Samanya Seva Medal	Samar Seva Star		Paschimi Star
Raksha Medal	Sangram Medal	Sainya Seva Medal	Indian Independence Medal
25th Anniversary of Independence Medal	30 Years Long Service Medal	20 Years Long Service Medal	9 Years Long Service Medal
1939–1945 Star	Burma Star	War Medal 1939–1945	India Service Medal

== Dates of rank ==
Insignia	Rank	Component	Date of rank
	Second Lieutenant	British Indian Army	9 August 1942 (emergency); 9 May 1943 (substantive)
	Lieutenant	British Indian Army	9 February 1943 (war-substantive); 12 October 1946 (substantive, with seniority from 9 November 1944)
	Captain	British Indian Army	1945 (temporary); 1946 (war-substantive)
	Major	British Indian Army	1946 (temporary)
	Lieutenant	Indian Army	15 August 1947 (Note: Upon independence in 1947, India became a Dominion within the British Commonwealth of Nations. As a result, the rank insignia of the British Army, incorporating the Tudor Crown and four-pointed Bath Star ("pip"), was retained, as George VI remained Commander-in-Chief of the Indian Armed Forces. After 26 January 1950, when India became a republic, the President of India became Commander-in-Chief, and the Ashoka Lion replaced the crown, with a five-pointed star being substituted for the "pip.")
	Captain	Indian Army	9 May 1949
	Captain	Indian Army	26 January 1950 (recommissioning and change in insignia)
	Major	Indian Army	9 May 1956
	Lieutenant-Colonel	Indian Army	9 May 1959
	Colonel	Indian Army	4 August 1966
	Brigadier	Indian Army	15 March 1965 (acting); 5 January 1968 (substantive)
	Major General	Indian Army	29 June 1969 (acting); 4 August 1970 (substantive)
	Lieutenant-General	Indian Army	2 August 1974
	General (COAS)	Indian Army	1 June 1981

== Notes ==
Military offices
Preceded by J.F.R. Jacob	General Officer Commanding XVI Corps; 1974–1978	Succeeded by K. Chiman Singh
Preceded by S. L. Menezes	Deputy Chief of the Army Staff; 1978–1979	Succeeded by H. C. Dutta
Preceded by Inderjit Singh Gill	General Officer Commanding-in-Chief Western Command; 1979–1981	Succeeded by Srinivas Kumar Sinha
Preceded by Om Prakash Malhotra	Chief of Army Staff; 1981–1983	Succeeded by Arun Shridhar Vaidya
Government offices
Preceded by S. M. H. Burney	Governor of Tripura; 1984–1989	Succeeded by Sultan Singh
Preceded by S. M. H. Burney	Governor of Nagaland; 1984–1989	Succeeded by Dr Gopal Singh
Preceded by Hiteswar Saikia	Governor of Mizoram; May 1989 – July 1989	Succeeded by Capt W A Sangma
Preceded by Jagmohan	Governor of Jammu and Kashmir; 1989–1990	Succeeded by Jagmohan
Preceded by Girish Chandra Saxena	Governor of Jammu and Kashmir; 1993–1998	Succeeded by Girish Chandra Saxena
