= 1997 in India =

- Centuries: 18th; 19th; 20th; 21st
- Decades: 1970s; 1980s; 1990s; 2000s; 2010s
- See also: List of years in India; Timeline of Indian history

Events in the year 1997 in the Republic of India.

== Incumbents ==
- President of India – Shankar Dayal Sharma until 25 July, K. R. Narayanan
- Prime minister of India – H. D. Deve Gowda until 21 April, Inder Kumar Gujral
- Vice President of India – K. R. Narayanan until 21 August, Krishna Kant
- Chief Justice of India – Aziz Mushabber Ahmadi until 24 March, Jagdish Sharan Verma

=== Governors ===
- Andhra Pradesh –
  - until 22 August: Krishan Kant
  - 22 August-24 November: Gopala Ramanujam
  - starting 24 November: C. Rangarajan
- Arunachal Pradesh – Mata Prasad
- Assam – Loknath Mishra (until 1 September), Srinivas Kumar Sinha (starting 1 September)
- Bihar – Mohammad Shafi Qureshi
- Goa – P.C. Alexander
- Gujarat – Krishna Pal Singh
- Haryana – Mahabir Prasad
- Himachal Pradesh – Mahabir Prasad (until 25 July), V. S. Ramadevi (starting 25 July)
- Jammu and Kashmir – K. V. Krishna Rao
- Karnataka – Khurshed Alam Khan
- Kerala – Khurshid Alam Khan (until 25 January), Sukhdev Singh Kang (starting 25 January)
- Madhya Pradesh – Mohammad Shafi Qureshi
- Maharashtra – P.C. Alexander
- Manipur – O.N. Shrivastava
- Meghalaya – M.M. Jacob
- Mizoram – P. R. Kyndiah
- Nagaland – Om Prakash Sharma
- Odisha –
  - until 30 January: Gopala Ramanujam
  - 30 January-12 February: K. V. Raghunatha Reddy
  - 13 February-13 December: Gopala Ramanujam
  - starting 13 December: K. V. Raghunatha Reddy
- Punjab – Bakshi Krishan Nath Chhibber
- Rajasthan – Bali Ram Bhagat
- Sikkim – Chaudhary Randhir Singh
- Tamil Nadu – Krishan Kant (until 24 January), M. Fathima Beevi (starting 24 January)
- Tripura – Siddheswar Prasad
- Uttar Pradesh – Romesh Bhandari
- West Bengal – K. V. Raghunatha Reddy

== Events ==
- National income - ₹15,452,939 million

=== January - March ===
- 7 February – An alliance of Sikh and Hindu nationalist parties wins a resounding victory over the Congress in state assembly elections in Punjab.
- 28 February – The government is strengthened by a daring, market friendly budget.
- 13 March – India's Missionaries of Charity chooses Sister Nirmala to succeed Mother Teresa as its leader.
- 19 March – The Bahujan Samaj Party (BSP), a powerful party, deserts its alliance with Congress in Uttar Pradesh to form a government with the Bharatiya Janata Party (BJP).
- 30 March – Congress withdraws support from the United Front, accusing Prime Minister H.D. Deve Gowda of poor leadership.

=== April - June ===
- 21 April – Inder Kumar Gujral, a new leader acceptable to Congress, is sworn in as prime minister.
- 21 April – 1997 Raghopur Massacre took place in Bihar.
- 22 May – The 5.8 M_{w} Jabalpur earthquake shook central India with a maximum Mercalli intensity of VIII (Severe), killing 38–56 and injuring 1,000–1,500.
- 7 June - Brihadeeswarar temple fire at Tamil Nadu.
- June - Jagmohan Dalmiya elected as the president of International Cricket Council.
- 30 June - 1997 Melavalavu massacre in Tamil Nadu

=== July - September ===
- 3 July – Laloo Prasad Yadav is ousted as president of the Janata Dal party. On 5 July he announces the formation of a new party called Rashtriya Janata Dal.
- 14 July – K.R. Narayanan is elected president, defeating T.N. Seshan.
- 25 July – Laloo Prasad Yadav resigns as chief minister of Bihar after a warrant for his arrest, on charges relating to an animal fodder scandal, had been issued. He names his wife, Rabri Devi, as his successor and the first woman chief minister of Bihar.
- 25 July – K.R. Narayanan is sworn in as India's 10th president and the first member of the Dalit caste to hold this office.
- 16 August – Krishan Kant is elected vice president.
- 5 September – Mother Teresa of Calcutta dies of heart failure in Kolkata.
- 9 September – 49 senior Hindu politicians and religious figures are charged with conspiracy and incitement to riot for their alleged role in the sacking of the Babri mosque at Ayodhya in 1992.

=== October - December ===
- 1 October – Heavy rainfall in Bangalore.
- 12–18 October – Elizabeth II pays a state visit to India.
- 14 October - Arundhati Roy wins Booker Prize for her debut novel The God of Small Things.
- 21 October – Violence erupts in the Uttar Pradesh state assembly during a vote of confidence on the Hindu nationalist state government. Deputies trade blows on the floor of the assembly in the state capital of Lucknow and hurl chairs and microphones at each other. A dozen lawmakers are injured and several journalists are also hurt. The BJP's one-month-old government headed by chief minister Kalyan Singh lost key support in a hung assembly on 19 October when the Bahujan Samaj Party withdrew its support, plunging India's most populous state into a political crisis. The government wins the confidence vote after opposition members walk out in protest against the violence in the hall. Federal rule over the state is imposed the same day, but later cancelled.
- 20 November – Congress threatens to withdraw support for the United Front if it does not drop the regional Dravida Munnetra Kazhagam (DMK) party from the government after the DMK was linked by an investigative panel to Sri Lankan separatists blamed for the killing of Rajiv Gandhi.
- 21 November – The 6.1 M_{w} Chittagong earthquake shook the Bangladesh-India-Myanmar border region, killing 23 and injuring 200.
- 26 November – The United Front rejects the Congress demand to expel the DMK.
- 28 November – Prime Minister Inder Kumar Gujral resigns after the Congress party withdrew support from his government.
- 4 December – The president orders mid-term elections.
- 29 December – Sonia Gandhi, Italian-born widow of Rajiv Gandhi, announces her decision to join the Congress election campaign.

== Law ==
- TRAI (telecom regulator) is established.

== Births ==
- 4 Jan - Nimisha Sajayan, actress
- 17 January - Charithra Chandran, english actress
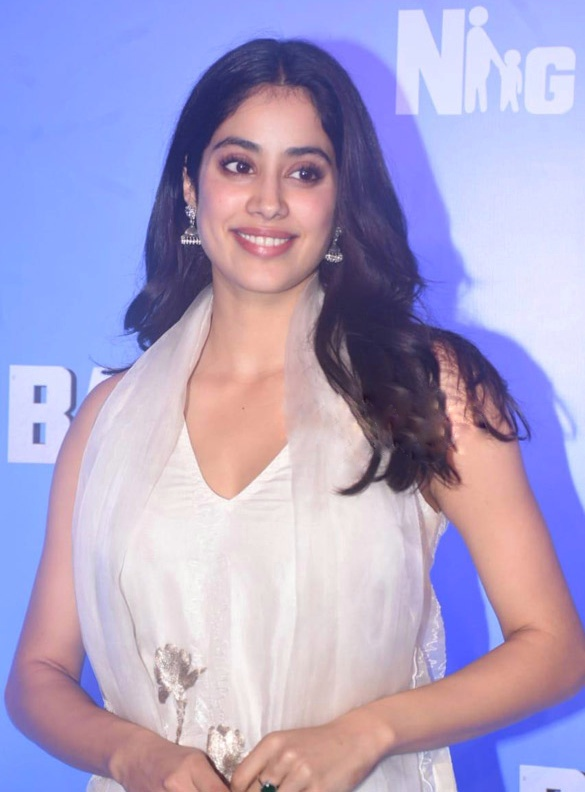
- Janhvi Kapoor
  6 March - Janhvi Kapoor, actress
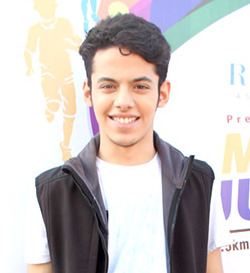
- Darsheel Safary
  9 March – Darsheel Safary, actor
- 28 March - Anu Emmanuel, actress
- 6 April – Gaurav Bajaj, actor
- 8 April – Sayantan Das, chess player
- 12 April – Ulka Gupta, actress
- 22 April – Parvathy Soman, singer
- 14 May – Manushi Chhillar, model, actress (miss world 2017)
- 19 June – Roshan Sebastian, singer
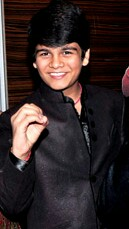
- Bhavya Gandhi
  20 June – Bhavya Gandhi, actor.
- 21 June - Faria Abdullah, actress and theatre artiste
- 22 June - Banita Sandhu, actress
- 7 July -Tanya Maniktala, actress
- 1 August - Medha Shankr, actress
- 12 August - Sayyeshaa, actress.
- 12 August - Ashi Singh, actress
- 24 August - Deepti Sharma, cricketer
- 14 September – Pragathi Guruprasad, singer
- 2 October – Lovlina Borgohain, Indian boxer and an Olympic medal winner.
- 4 October – Rishabh Pant, cricketer
- 11 October – Tathoi Deb, actor and director
- 12 October – Rinku Singh, cricketer
- 14 October - Dushara Vijayan, actress
- 22 October – Sarfaraz Khan, cricketer
- 26 October - Femina George, actress
- 11 November – Mayank Markande, cricketer
- 28 November - Alaya F, actress
- 5 December – Khaleel Ahmed, cricketer
- 12 December – Ravi Kumar Dahiya, Indian freestyle wrestler who won a silver medal at the 2020 Tokyo Olympics in the 57 kg category.
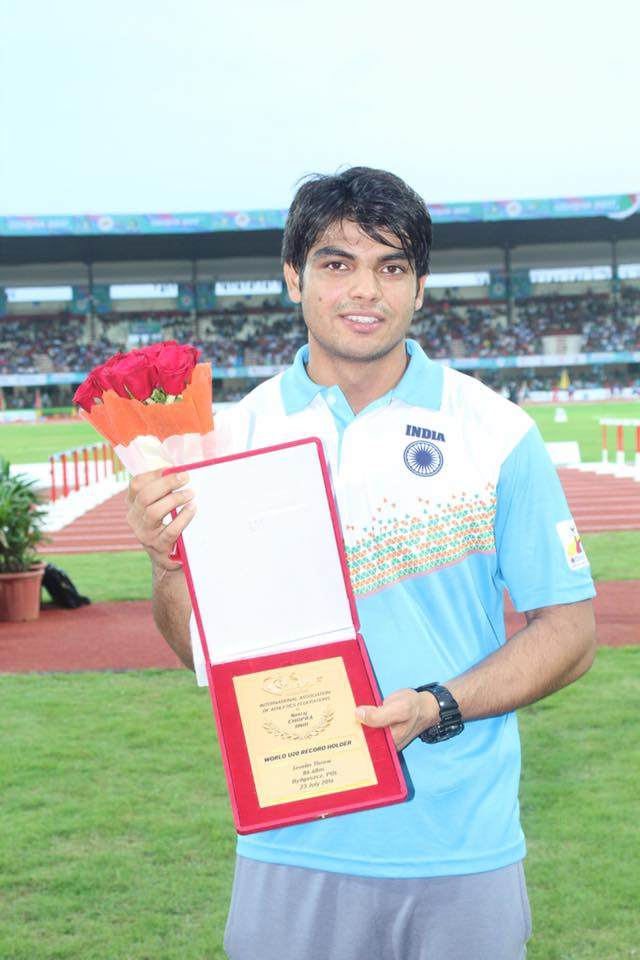
- Neeraj Chopra
  24 December – Neeraj Chopra, Indian army, 2021 Olympics Gold medalist in Javelin throw

=== Full date unknown ===
- Alka Ajith, singer
- Shriya Sharma, actress and model

== Deaths ==
- 28 January – Palani Baba, fundamentalist Islamist politician.
- 23 June – Acharya Tulsi, 9th Acharya of the Shwetambar Terapanth sect of Jainism (b. 1914)
- 5 September - Mother Teresa
- 9 December – K. Shivaram Karanth, writer, social activist, environmentalist, Yakshagana artist, movie maker and thinker (b. 1902).
- Anup Kumar, actor (b. 1932).

== See also ==
- Bollywood films of 1997
