= 1994 in India =

- Centuries: 18th; 19th; 20th; 21st
- Decades: 1970s; 1980s; 1990s; 2000s; 2010s
- See also: List of years in India; Timeline of Indian history

Events in the year 1994 in the Republic of India.

== Incumbents ==
- President of India – Shankar Dayal Sharma
- Prime Minister of India – P. V. Narasimha Rao
- Vice President of India – K. R. Narayanan
- Chief Justice of India – Manepalli Narayana Rao Venkatachaliah until 24 October, Aziz Mushabber Ahmadi

=== Governors ===
- Andhra Pradesh – Krishan Kant
- Arunachal Pradesh – Mata Prasad
- Assam – Loknath Mishra
- Bihar – Akhlaqur Rahman Kidwai
- Goa –
  - until 3 April: Bhanu Prakash Singh
  - 4 April-3 August: B. Rachaiah
  - starting 3 August: Gopala Ramanujam
- Gujarat – Sarup Singh
- Haryana – Dhanik Lal Mandal
- Himachal Pradesh – Sudhakarrao Naik (starting 30 July)
- Jammu and Kashmir – K. V. Krishna Rao
- Karnataka – Khurshed Alam Khan
- Kerala – B. Rachaiah
- Madhya Pradesh – Mohammad Shafi Qureshi
- Maharashtra – P.C. Alexander
- Manipur – V. K. Nayar (until 22 December), O. N. Shrivastava (starting 23 December)
- Meghalaya – Madhukar Dighe
- Mizoram – P. R. Kyndiah
- Nagaland – V. K. Nayar (until 4 August), O. N. Shrivastava (starting 4 August)
- Odisha – B. Satya Narayan Reddy
- Punjab –
  - until 9 July: Surendra Nath
  - 9 July-18 September: Sudhakar Panditrao Kurdukar
  - starting 18 September: Bakshi Krishan Nath Chhibber
- Rajasthan – Bali Ram Bhagat
- Sikkim – Radhakrishna Hariram Tahiliani (until 20 September), P. Shiv Shankar (starting 20 September)
- Tamil Nadu – Marri Chenna Reddy
- Tripura – Romesh Bhandari
- Uttar Pradesh – Motilal Vora
- West Bengal – K. V. Raghunatha Reddy

== Events ==
- National income - ₹10,275,701 million
- 26 January – India rolls out the short-range Prithvi missile at Republic Day Parade in New Delhi.
- 27 January - Kupwara massacre
- 22 February - Encounter killing of five youth including an All Assam Students' Union worker in Dangari by Indian Army.
- Parliament of India passes resolution that declares Kashmir as an integral part of India.
- 11 March - S. R. Bommai v. Union of India verdict by Supreme Court of India.
- 20 May – Sushmita Sen was crowned Miss Universe 1994 in Manila, Philippines.
- 26 August - Plague breakout in India from Surat.
- 2 October - Rampur Tiraha Firing by the Police kills Uttarakhand Statehood Activists in Rampur
- 7 October - Anti-Urdu news bulletin riots cause 25 deaths in Bangalore.
- 19 November – Aishwarya Rai was crowned Miss World 1994 in Sun City, South Africa.
- 25 November - Koothuparamba firing in Kerala
- 30 November - Nambi Narayanan arrested in connection with ISRO espionage case.
- 5 December - G. Krishnaiah IAS, District magistrate of Gopalganj district, India lynched to death by a mob which was instigated by politician Anand Mohan Singh.
- 13 December - Janata Dal emerged victorious in 1994 Karnataka Legislative Assembly election.

== Law ==
- Pre-Conception and Pre-Natal Diagnostic Techniques Act, 1994
- Transplantation of Human Organs and Tissues Act, 1994
- Airports Authority of India Act 1994

== Births ==
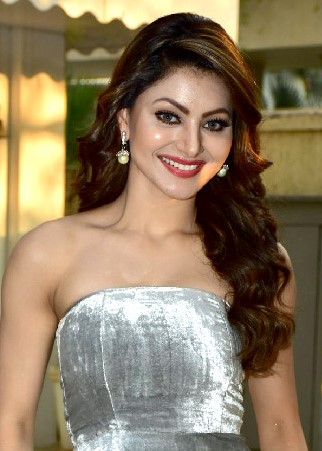
Urvashi Rautela

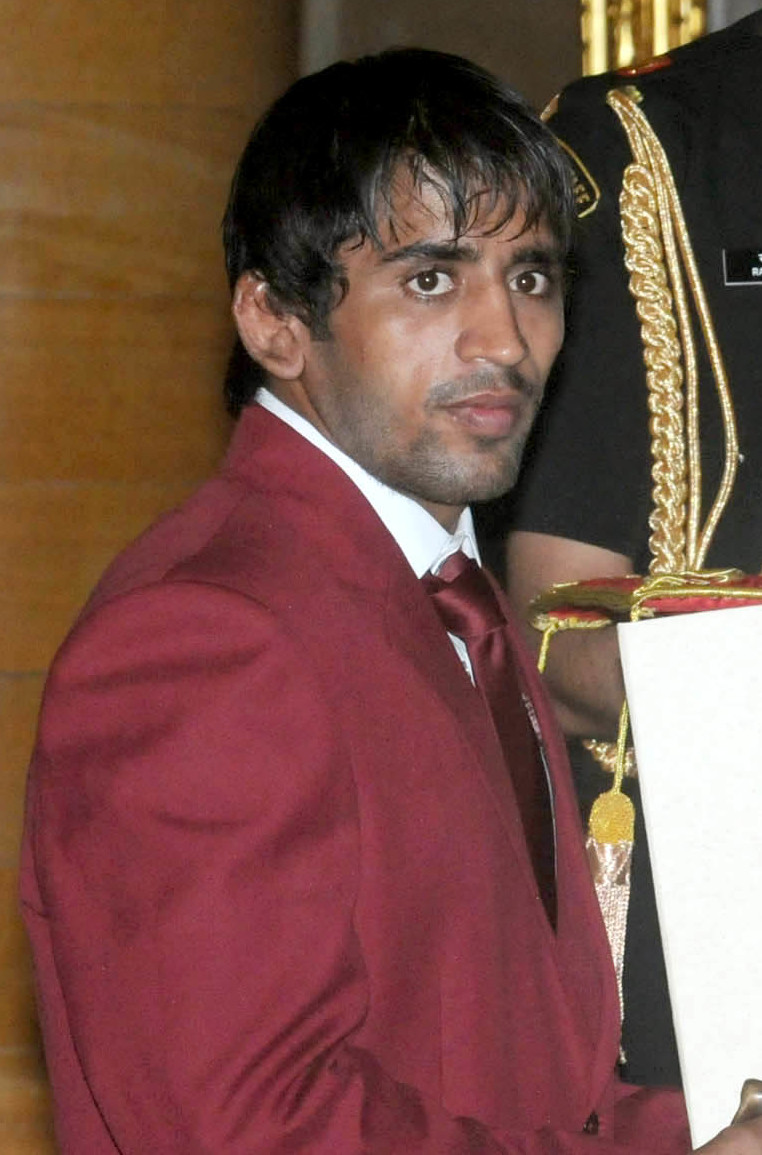
Bajrang Punia

- 08 January - Ankit Boora, Model Actor Athlete
- 18 Feb Sneh Rana, cricketer
- 25 Feb – Urvashi Rautela, actress
- 26 Feb - Bajrang Punia, Olympic medalist
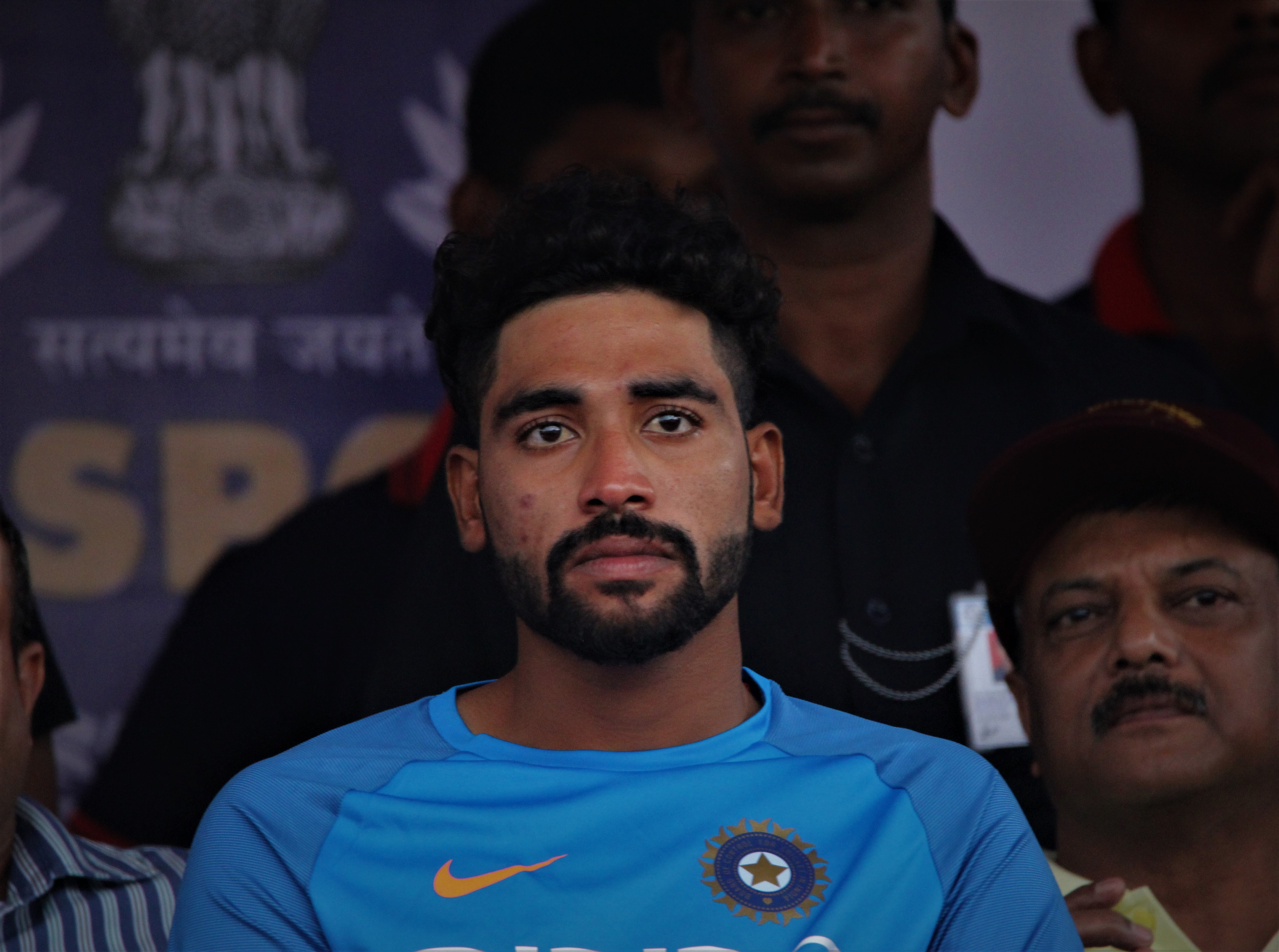
- Mohammed Siraj
  13 March – Mohammed Siraj, cricketer

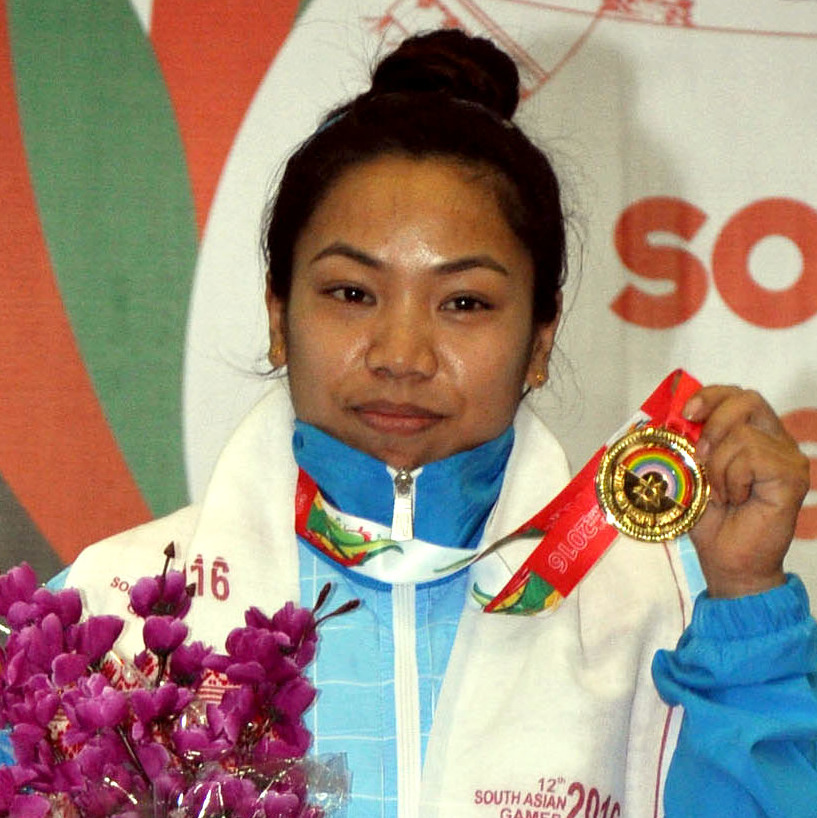
Saikhom Mirabai Chanu

- 13 June – Deepika Kumari, archer
- 8 August – Mirabai Chanu, weightlifter
- 3 November – Sanusha, actress
- 11 November - Sanju Samson, cricketer
- 20 November – Priyanka Arul Mohan, actress.
- 6 December – Shreyas Iyer, cricketer
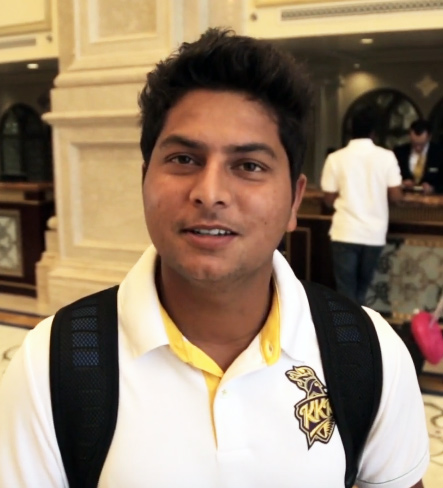
- Kuldeep Yadav
  14 December – Kuldeep Yadav, cricketer
- 20 December – Nazriya Nazim, anchor, model and actress
- 21 December – Athulya Ravi, actress.
- 22 December Michael Dabhi, Politician

== Deaths ==
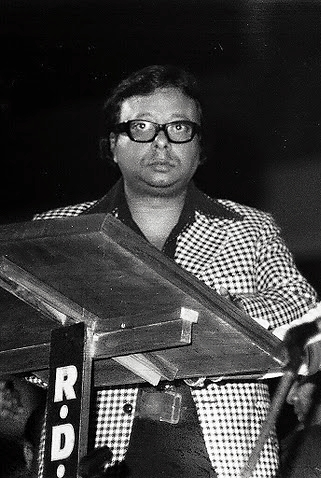
R. D. Burman

- 4 January – Rahul Dev Burman, music director.
- 8 January - Jagadguru Sri Chandrashekarendra Saraswati Shankaracharya, 99, 68th guru of Kanchi Mutt (born 1894).
- 9 June – Dhirendra Brahmachari, Yoga guru and mentor of Indira Gandhi (born 1924).
- 22 June – L. V. Prasad, actor, producer and director (born 1908).
- 11 November - Kuvempu, poet, writer and playwright (born 1904).

== See also ==
- Bollywood films of 1994
