= 2006 in Bangladesh =

- Centuries: 20th; 21st
- Decades: 1980s; 1990s; 2000s; 2010s; 2020s
- See also: Other events of 2006; List of years in Bangladesh

2006 (MMVI) was a common year starting on Sunday of the Gregorian calendar, the 2006th year of the Common Era (CE) and Anno Domini (AD) designations, the 6th year of the 3rd millennium and the 21st century, and the 7th year of the 2000s decade.

The year 2006 was the 35th year after the independence of Bangladesh. It was the last year of the rule of BNP led by Khaleda Zia and also the first year of the regime of the fourth caretaker government led by Fakhruddin Ahmed.

== Incumbents ==
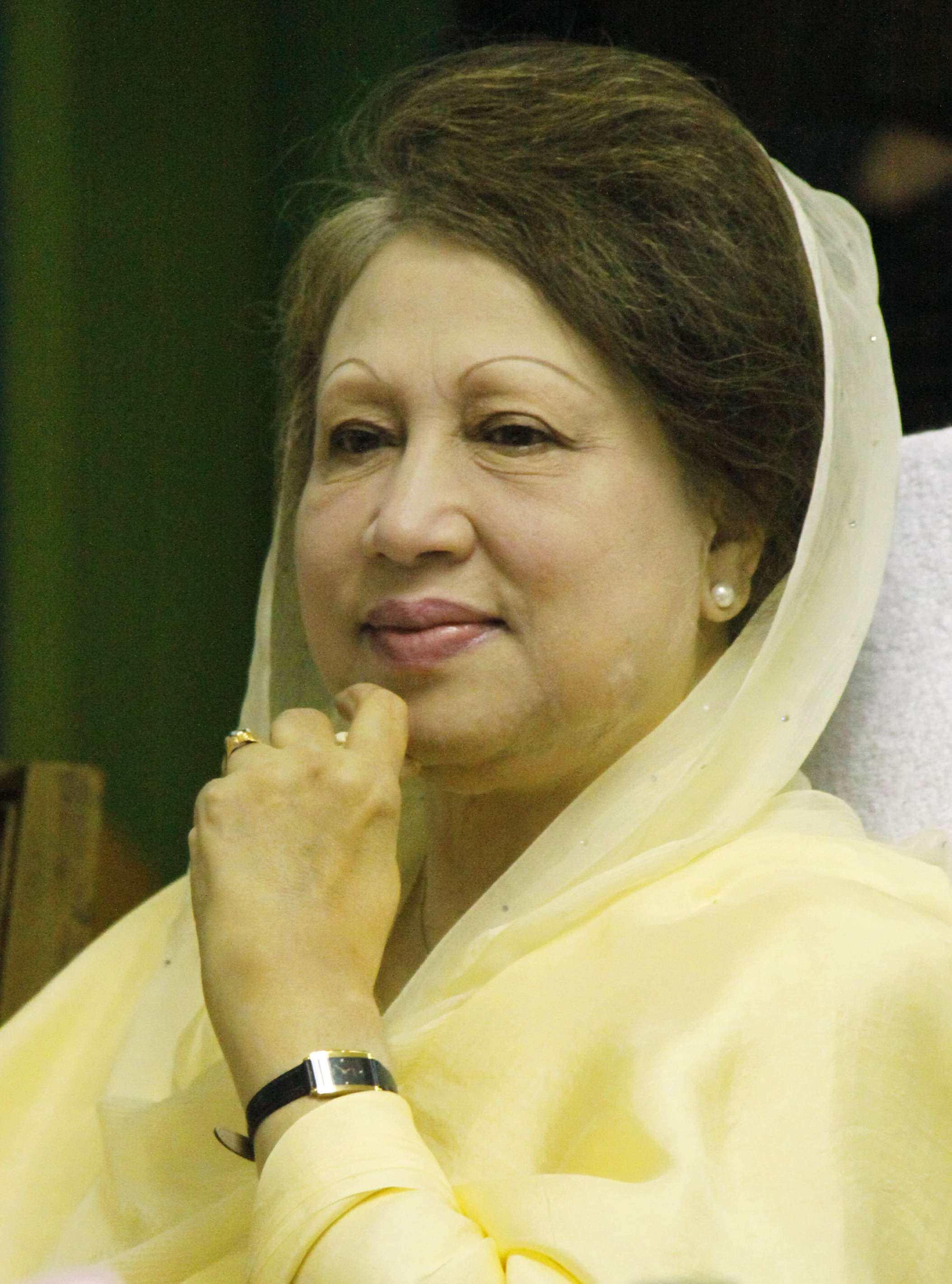
Khaleda
Zia

- President: Iajuddin Ahmed
- Prime Minister: Khaleda Zia (until 29 October), Iajuddin Ahmed (starting 29 October)
- Chief Justice: Syed Jillur Rahim Mudasser Husain

== Demography ==
Demographic Indicators for Bangladesh in 2006
Population, total	140,921,154
Population density (per km^{2})	1082.6
Population growth (annual %)	1.3%
Male to Female Ratio (every 100 Female)	104.7
Urban population (% of total)	27.5%
Birth rate, crude (per 1,000 people)	23.4
Death rate, crude (per 1,000 people)	6.1
Mortality rate, under 5 (per 1,000 live births)	61
Life expectancy at birth, total (years)	68.2
Fertility rate, total (births per woman)	2.6

== Climate ==
Climate data for Bangladesh in 2006
Month	Jan	Feb	Mar	Apr	May	Jun	Jul	Aug	Sep	Oct	Nov	Dec	Year
Daily mean °C (°F)	19.2 (66.6)	23.7 (74.7)	26.1 (79.0)	27.8 (82.0)	28.4 (83.1)	28.5 (83.3)	28.4 (83.1)	28.3 (82.9)	28.5 (83.3)	27.5 (81.5)	23.9 (75.0)	20.6 (69.1)	25.9 (78.6)
Average precipitation mm (inches)	0.0 (0.0)	3.9 (0.15)	5.9 (0.23)	380.5 (14.98)	135.7 (5.34)	239.2 (9.42)	447.3 (17.61)	286.3 (11.27)	343.8 (13.54)	75.6 (2.98)	24.7 (0.97)	1.9 (0.07)	1,944.8 (76.56)
Source: Climatic Research Unit (CRU) of University of East Anglia (UEA)

== Economy ==
Key Economic Indicators for Bangladesh in 2006
National Income
	Current US$	Current BDT	% of GDP
GDP	$71.8 billion	BDT4.8 trillion	
GDP growth (annual %)	6.7%		
GDP per capita	$509.6	BDT34,227	
Agriculture, value added	$13.0 billion	BDT0.9 trillion	18.0%
Industry, value added	$17.3 billion	BDT1.2 trillion	24.1%
Services, etc., value added	$37.9 billion	BDT2.5 trillion	52.7%
Balance of Payment
	Current US$	Current BDT	% of GDP
Current account balance	$1.2 billion		1.7%
Imports of goods and services	$16.8 billion	BDT1.0 trillion	21.8%
Exports of goods and services	$12,887.5 million	BDT0.8 trillion	16.4%
Foreign direct investment, net inflows	$456.5 million		0.6%
Personal remittances, received	$5,427.5 million		7.6%
Total reserves (includes gold) at year end	$3,877.2 million		
Total reserves in months of imports	2.6		

Note: For the year 2006 average official exchange rate for BDT was 68.93 per US$.

== Events ==
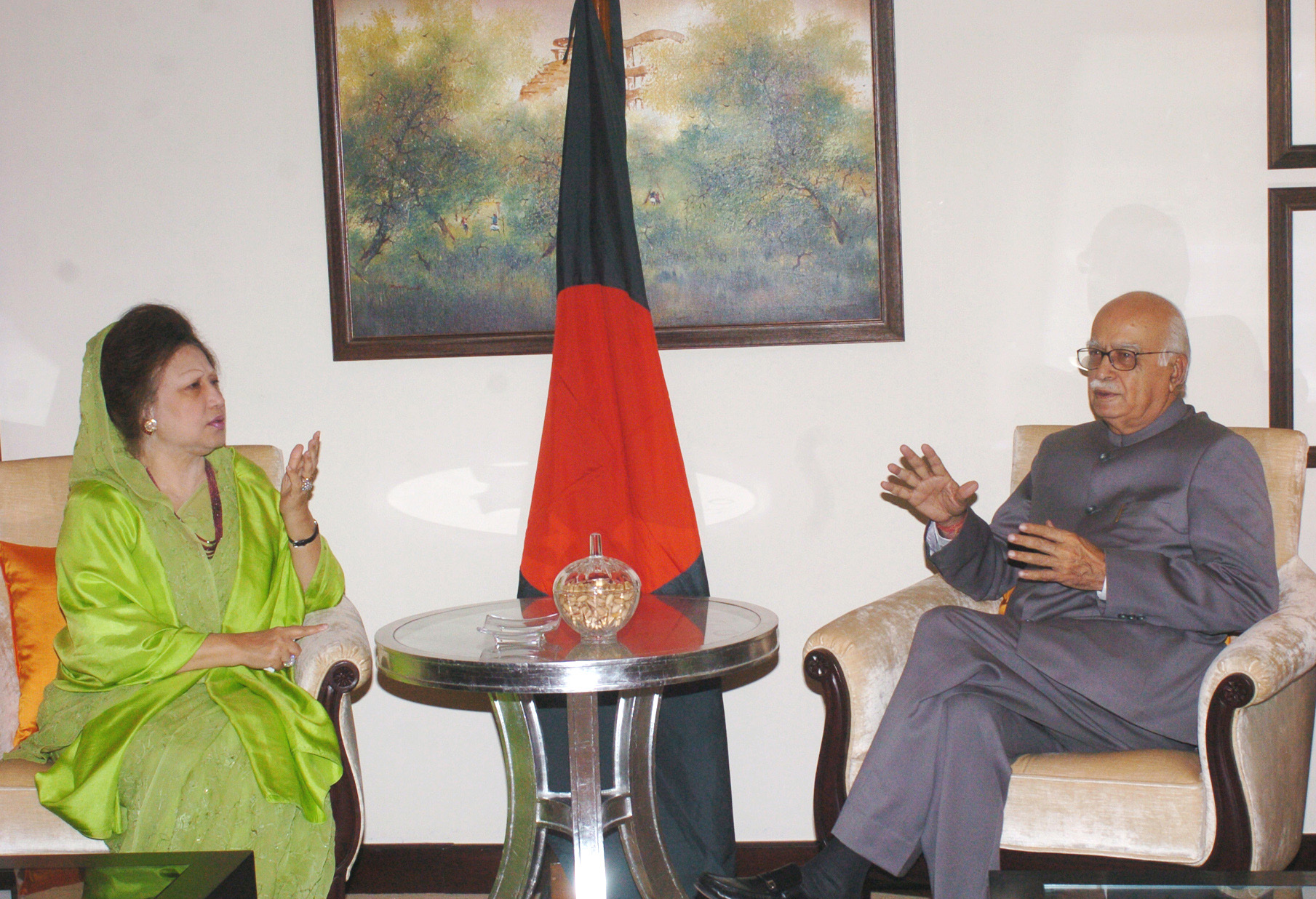
Zia with the then Leader of Opposition of India Shri L.K. Advani in New Delhi (2006)

- 3 January – Security forces captured three Arakan rebels and seized arms and ammunition, including light machine gun, AK47 and M16 automatic rifles, from a den in the remote forests of Naikkhongchhari in Bandarban District.
- 23 January – Seven people were killed and more than a hundred injured, when police opened fire to disperse a mob in Kansat Bazar in Chapainawabganj District. The firing took place when locals were demonstrating for the release of three leaders of Palli Bidyut Sangram Committee (PBSC), an organisation of local electricity subscribers, arrested in connection with 4 January violence in the area which left 2 dead.
- 23 February – At least 54 people died from a fire incident at a composite textile factory that also had a garment section in Chittagong.
- 2 March – Terrorist leader Shaykh Abdur Rahman is captured.
- 6 March – Terrorist leader Siddique ul-Islam is captured.
- 24 April – A PT-6 training aircraft of Bangladesh Air Force crashes in Jhenaidah District, killing the 20-year-old trainee pilot Taniul Islam.
- 24 June – The remains of Matiur Rahman, a recipient of the Bir Sreshtho, killed in action during the Liberation War of 1971, are brought back to Bangladesh.
- 21 August – Dawra degree of Qawmi Madrasah gets recognition as equivalent to master's degree.
- 27 August – At least seven people were killed and about 300 injured as police and Bangladesh Rifles (BDR) opened fire on demonstrators advancing towards the office of Asia Energy Corporation (Bangladesh) Pvt Ltd in Dinajpur District protesting adverse impact on the local community due to open pit coal extraction method of proposed Phulbari project.
- 19 September – At least 25 people were killed and thousands went missing when a violent storm hit the country's coastal belt.
- 20 September – Severe power crisis practically paralyzed the country.
- 28 October – Six people are killed and 100s injured as the Government prepares to hand over power to Justice K M Hasan ahead of elections amid protests from opposition who view Hasan unfit for the role.
- 29 October - President Iajuddin Ahmed assumed the office of chief adviser to the non-party caretaker government in addition to his presidential responsibilities as Justice Hasan refuses to take the role.
- 12 November – A non-stop countrywide blockade enforced by the Awami League-led 14-party alliance begins amid heightened tension as the deadline given to the president/chief adviser for implementing the alliance's demands including change of the chief election commissioner.
- 9 December – President and CA Iajuddin Ahmed ordered army deployment in aid of the civil administration to maintain law and order ahead of the forthcoming general election.

=== Awards and recognitions ===
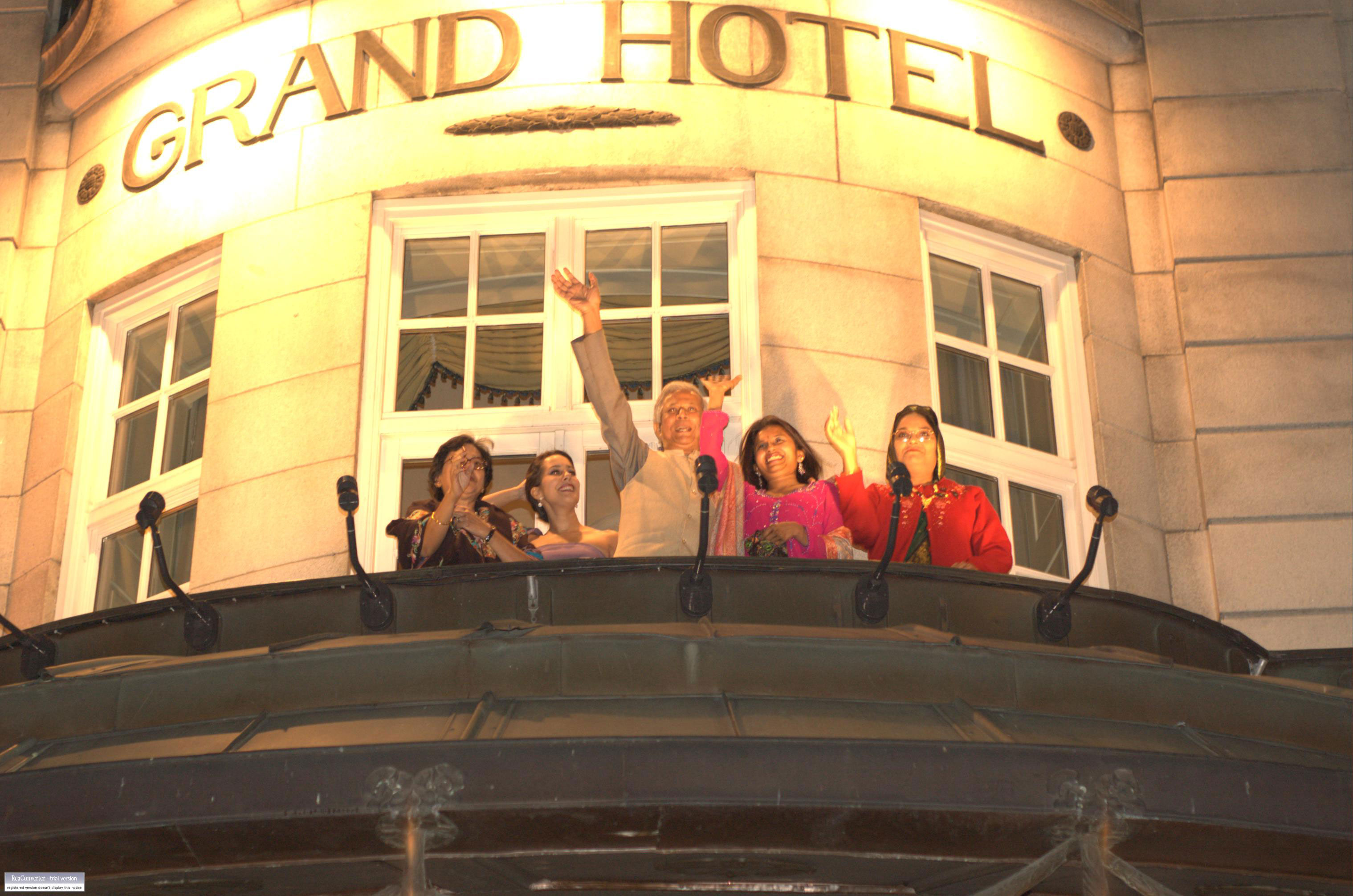
Yunus at the Grand Hotel in Oslo, Norway

==== International recognition ====
- On 13 October, Dr. Muhammad Yunus and Grameen Bank jointly won the Nobel Peace Prize "for their efforts to create economic and social development from below".

Yunus was the first Bangladeshi to ever get a Nobel Prize. After receiving the news of the important award, Yunus announced that he would use part of his share of the $1.4 million (equivalent to $2.24 million in 2025) award money to create a company to make low-cost, high-nutrition food for the poor; while the rest would go toward setting up an eye hospital for the poor in Bangladesh.

==== Independence Day Award ====
- Rapid Action Battalion and Bangladesh Betar were awarded for their social work and contribution in the war of liberation respectively.

==== Ekushey Padak ====
1. Aftab Ahmed, photography
2. Jasimuddin Ahmed, education
3. M. Asaduzzaman, education
4. Sukomal Barua, education
5. Anwara Begum, education
6. Shahadat Chowdury, journalism (posthumous)
7. Nurul Islam, literature (posthumous)
8. Anwaruddin Khan, music (posthumous)
9. Gaziul Hasan Khan, journalism
10. Hamiduzzaman Khan, sculpture
11. Abul Kalam Monjur Morshed, literature
12. Rawshan Ara Mustafiz, music
13. Fatema Tuz Zohra, music

=== Sports ===
- Asian Games:
  - Bangladesh participated in the 2006 Asian Games held in Doha, Qatar. Bangladesh national kabaddi team won bronze medal in kabaddi.
- Commonwealth Games:
  - Bangladesh participated in the 2006 Commonwealth Games held in Melbourne, Australia. Shooter Asif Hossain Khan and Anjan Kumer Singha won silver medal in Men's 10m Air Rifle (Pairs).
- South Asian (Federation) Games:
  - Bangladesh participated in the 2006 South Asian Federation Games held in Colombo, Sri Lanka from 18 August to 28 August. With 3 golds, 15 silvers and 32 bronzes Bangladesh ended the tournament at the sixth position in overall points table.
- Football:
  - The 2006 AFC Challenge Cup was held between 1 and 16 April 2006 in Bangladesh. Sixteen teams were split into four groups, the top two in each group qualifying for the quarterfinals, and from then on a straight knockout contest. Bangladesh defeated Cambodia, Guam and drew with Palestine to reach the knock-out round, but then left the tournament after losing to eventual champion Tajikistan.
- Cricket:
  - Sri Lanka toured Bangladesh in February. They whitewashed the hosts in Test series and won the ODI series 2–1.
  - Kenya toured Bangladesh in March. This time the hosts whitewashed the visitors in a 4 match ODI series.
  - Then, Australia toured Bangladesh in April and whitewashed the hosts in both Test and ODI series.
  - In August Bangladesh toured Zimbabwe and lost to the hosts ina 5 match ODI series at 2–3 margin.
  - Zimbabwe visited Bangladesh for a return tour in November–December when Bangladesh managed to whitewash them in the 5 match ODI series.
- Chess:
  - Grandmaster Reefat Bin-Sattar earned his GM title.

== Deaths ==
- 21 January – Shamsul Islam Khan, artist and entrepreneur (b. 1926).
- 19 March – Kazi Golam Mahbub, activist and politician (b. 1927).
- 11 May – Humayun Khan Panni, politician (b. 1921).
- 30 May – Husna Banu Khanam, educationist, musician and journalist (b. 1922).
- 1 July – Shaukat Ali Khan, lawyer and politician (b. 1926).
- 15 September – Nitun Kundu, artist and entrepreneur (b. 1935).
- 26 September – Aftab Ahmed, academician (b. 1949).
- 7 October – Nurul Islam, broadcaster (b. 1928).
- 10 October – Sheikh Akijuddin, entrepreneur (b. 1929).
- 31 December – Shefali Ghosh, music artist (b. 1941).

== See also ==
- 2000s in Bangladesh
- List of Bangladeshi films of 2006
- Timeline of Bangladeshi history
