= 1924 in India =

- Centuries: 18th; 19th; 20th; 21st
- Decades: 1900s; 1910s; 1920s; 1930s; 1940s
- See also: List of years in India; Timeline of Indian history

Events in the year 1924 in India.

== Incumbents ==
- Emperor of India – George V
- Viceroy of India – The Earl of Reading

== Events ==
- National income - ₹29,930 million
- 12 January – Gopinath Saha shoots a man he erroneously thinks is a Police commissioner of Calcutta, Charles Augustus Tegart – he is arrested soon after.
- January - Bombay textile mill strike by communists began.
- February – Mohandas Gandhi is released prematurely on medical grounds.
- 30 March - Commencement of Vaikom Satyagraha (the first ever struggle against apartheid in the World) designed by T K Madhavan and Sree Narayana Guru in Kerala, South India.
- 14 -20 July - Great flood of 99 in Travancore, Kingdom of Cochin and Malabar District.
- 9–11 September – 1924 Kohat riots.
- 17 September - 21 days long fasting by Mahatma Gandhi for Hindu - Muslim unity.
- 4 December – The Gateway of India in Bombay, built to commemorate the visit of King George V and Queen Mary in December 1911, is opened by the Viceroy, the Earl of Reading.
- Reorganization of the Muslim League by Muhammad Ali Jinnah.

== Births ==
- 1 January – Kamala Markandaya, novelist and journalist (died 2004).
- 4 January – Sebastian Kappen, priest and theologian (died 1993)
- 27 January – Sabu Dastagir, actor (died 1963).
- 21 February – Krishna Prakash Bahadur, writer (died 2000).
- 24 February - Talat Mahmood, playback singer and actor (died 1998).
- 2 March – Gulshan Rai, film producer and distributor (died 2004).
- 19 March – F. C. Kohli, industrialist (died 2020)
- 3 June - M. Karunanidhi, former chief minister of Tamil Nadu, poet, orator (died 7 August 2018 in Chennai, Tamil Nadu, India).
- 6 June – S. R. Bommai, politician and Chief Minister of Karnataka (died 2007).
- 1 July – Jan Azam, Pakistani sports shooter
- 3 July – Arjun Naidu, first-class cricketer (died 2000)
- 6 July – Mahim Bora, Indian writer and educationist (died 2016)
- 22 August – Harishankar Parsai, Hindi satirist and humorist (died 1995)
- 18 September – M. R. Schunker, naval officer (died 2021)
- 13 October – Moturu Udayam, women's activist (died 2002)
- 29 November – Parassala B. Ponnammal, Carnatic musician (died 2021)
- 14 December – Raj Kapoor, actor and director (died 1988).
- 24 December – Narayan Desai, pacifist and writer. (died 2015)
- 25 December - Atal Bihari Vajpayee, Poet, reporter, Former PM of India (died 2018)
- 24 December – Nissim Ezekiel, poet, playwright and art critic (died 2004).
- 24 December – Mohammed Rafi, playback singer (died 1980).
- unknown date
  - Mahendra Raj, structural engineer (died 2022)
  - P. K. Venugopalan Nambiar, agricultural scientist (died 1996).

== Deaths ==
- Chattampi Swamikal, Hindu sage and social reformer (born 1853).
- Kumaran Asan, a poet of Malayalam – the language of Kerala – attained eternity in a boat accident at Pallana river, near Thrikkunnappuzha, Harippad, in Kerala, Southern India.
