= 1996 in India =

- Centuries: 18th; 19th; 20th; 21st
- Decades: 1970s; 1980s; 1990s; 2000s; 2010s
- See also: List of years in India; Timeline of Indian history

Events in the year 1996 in the Republic of India.

== Incumbents ==
- President of India – Shankar Dayal Sharma
- Prime Minister of India – P. V. Narasimha Rao until 16 May, Atal Bihari Vajpayee until 1 June, H. D. Deve Gowda
- Vice President of India – K. R. Narayanan
- Chief Justice of India – Aziz Mushabber Ahmadi

=== Governors ===
- Andhra Pradesh – Krishan Kant
- Arunachal Pradesh – Mata Prasad
- Assam – Loknath Mishra
- Bihar – Akhlaqur Rahman Kidwai
- Goa – Romesh Bhandari (until 18 July), P.C. Alexander (starting 18 July)
- Gujarat – Naresh Chandra (until 1 March), Krishna Pal Singh (starting 1 March)
- Haryana – Mahabir Prasad
- Himachal Pradesh – Sheila Kaul (until 22 April), Mahabir Prasad (starting 22 April)
- Jammu and Kashmir – K. V. Krishna Rao
- Karnataka – Khurshed Alam Khan
- Kerala – P. Shiv Shankar (until 1 May), Khurshid Alam Khan (starting 5 May)
- Madhya Pradesh – Mohammad Shafi Qureshi
- Maharashtra – P.C. Alexander
- Manipur – O. N. Shrivastava
- Meghalaya – M.M. Jacob
- Mizoram – P. R. Kyndiah
- Nagaland – O. N. Shrivastava (until 12 November), Om Prakash Sharma (starting 12 November)
- Odisha – Gopala Ramanujam
- Punjab – Bakshi Krishan Nath Chhibber
- Rajasthan – Bali Ram Bhagat
- Sikkim – K. V. Raghunatha Reddy (until 9 February), Chaudhary Randhir Singh (starting 10 February)
- Tamil Nadu – Marri Chenna Reddy (until 2 December), Krishan Kant (starting 2 December)
- Tripura – Siddheswar Prasad
- Uttar Pradesh –
  - until 3 May: Motilal Vora
  - 3 May-19 July: Mohammad Shafi Qureshi
  - starting 19 July: Romesh Bhandari
- West Bengal – K. V. Raghunatha Reddy

== Events ==
- National income - ₹13,948,160 million

=== January - June ===
- January – A corruption scandal erupts that alleged many senior politicians and civil servants to have received bribes from prominent businessman Surendra Jain.
- January – Tensions with Pakistan rise sharply and there is an exchange of mortar and machine-gun fire across the Line of Control in Kashmir.
- 23 January – Priyadarshini Mattoo case.
- 29 January – S. R. Bommai resigns as president of the Janata Dal party and is replaced by Laloo Prasad Yadav.
- 27 April, 2 May and 7 May – In general elections the ruling Congress Party is defeated and Bharatiya Janata Party becomes the largest single party in parliament. Phoolan Devi, former bandit queen is elected to Parliament from the Samajwadi Party.
- 17 to 28 May – Atal Bihari Vajpayee, leader of the Bharatiya Janata Party, is elected the new prime minister of India, replacing P. V. Narasimha Rao of the Indian National Congress. However, the party does not receive an overall majority and Vajpayee resigns thirteen days later rather than face a no confidence vote, and is replaced by the United Front, led by Deve Gowda.
- 1 June – Deve Gowda is sworn in as the head of the United Front, a coalition of 13 parties which Congress supported but did not join. Gowda's new cabinet brings in powerful regional figures, mixing low-caste and Muslim leaders with veterans of the socialist movement.
- 28 June – Communist Party of India (Marxist) joins the United Front. For the second time they are being a part of ruling government coalition since independence first one being the Third Front (India) of 1989.

=== July - December ===
- 11 July –
- A Delhi court summons Congress president P.V. Narasimha Rao to testify as the co-accused in a cheating case.
- Bathani Tola massacre
- 28 August – At least 194 pilgrims are reported to have frozen to death in northern Kashmir after being stranded by violent rain and snow storms in the Amarnath Yatra tragedy.
- 19 September – The government of Gujarat under Chief Minister Suresh Mehta is sacked on recommendation of Prime Minister Gowda, and federal rule is imposed over the state. The move comes a day after the BJP government in Gujarat won a controversial vote of confidence in the state legislature. Mehta won the vote after the acting assembly speaker (a BJP member) suspended all opposition legislators. Fighting broke out on the floor of the assembly after marshals tried to force the suspended legislators to leave. Witnesses said lawmakers hurled pin cushions and microphones at each other. Several lawmakers and journalists were reportedly injured in the scuffles.
- 22 September – Rao resigns as president of the Congress Party.
- 23 September – Sitaram Kesri is elected Congress president.
- 4 October – Palakkad district Collector W.R. Reddy IAS kept in hostage by members of Ayyankali Pada in district collectorate as a protest to Kerala Scheduled Tribes (Restriction of Transfer of Lands and Restoration of Alienated Lands) Act.
- 10 October – Rao is arrested on fresh charges of forgery.
- 11 October – An Uttar Pradesh state election returns a hung assembly; the local power struggle sharpens conflicts between Congress and coalition parties at national level.
- 30 October – Michael Jackson arrived in Mumbai as a part of his HIStory World Tour and he performed for the first time ever in India in front of 66,000 fans on 1 November 1996 at Andheri Sports Complex.
- 7 November – A devastating Category 4 Cyclone strikes Andhra Pradesh, India. The storm surge sweeps fishing villages out to sea, over 2,000 people die. 95% of the crops are completely destroyed.
- 12 November – A Saudi Arabian Boeing 747 jumbo jet and a Kazakhstan Ilyushin cargo plane collide near Charkhi Dadri, killing 349 people in the world's deadliest mid-air collision.
- 28 November – Chinese President Jiang Zemin begins his three-day visit, the first visit by a Chinese head of state to India.
- 19 December – Rao resigns as Congress parliamentary leader, his last official party position.
- 30 December – In the Indian state of Assam, a passenger train is bombed by Bodo separatists, killing 26.

== Law ==
- Arbitration and Conciliation Act 1996
- Panchayats (Extension to Scheduled Areas) Act, 1996

== Births ==
- 6 January
  - Kishan Shrikanth, actor and director.
  - Harmanpreet Singh, hockey player
- 7 January – Helly Shah, actress
- 10 January – Siddhi Idnani, actress
- 18 February – Anupama Parameswaran, actress.
- 17 March - Rutuja Bhosale, tennis player and Kanchi Singh, actress
- 5 April – Rashmika Mandanna, actress
- 11 May – Fanai Lalrempuia, footballer
- 19 May – Lakshmi Menon, actress
- 22 May – Akhil Rabindra, racing driver
- 27 June – Tanay Chheda, actor
- 3 July – Jyothi Surekha Vennam, archer
- 18 July – Smriti Mandhana, cricketer
- 1 August – Sivasri skandaprasad, Carnatic musician
- 28 August – Aanchal Thakur, competitor
- 19 September - Namitha Pramod, actress
- 2 November - Sumedh Mudgalkar, actor, dancer

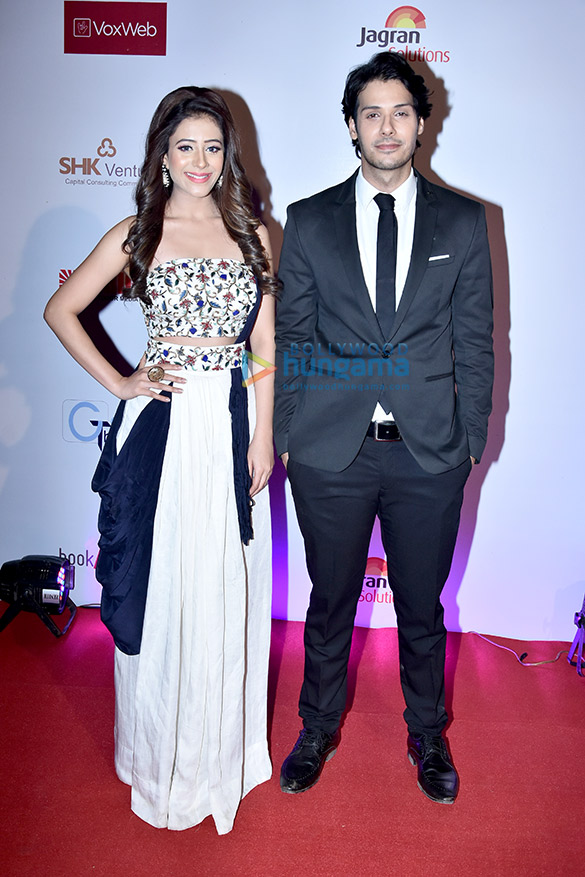
Hiba Nawab

- 14 November – Hiba Nawab, actress

== Deaths ==
- 18 January – N. T. Rama Rao, actor, director, producer, and politician (born 1923).
- 3 July – Raaj Kumar, actor (born 1926).
- 29 July – Aruna Asaf Ali, independence fighter (born 1909).

=== Full date unknown ===
- P. K. Venugopalan Nambiar, agricultural scientist (born 1924).

== See also ==
- Bollywood films of 1996
