= Anagha (name) =

Anagha is a name. Notable people with the name include:

- Anagha Maruthora, Indian actress (born 1992)
- Anagha Deshpande (born 1985), Indian cricketer
- Anagha J. Kolath, Indian Malayalam language poet (born 1994)
- Anagha Narayanan, Indian actress (born 2000)
- D. Karthika Anagha, Indian musician (born 1991)
