= 1916 in India =

- Centuries: 18th; 19th; 20th; 21st
- Decades: 1890s; 1900s; 1910s; 1920s; 1930s
- See also: List of years in India; Timeline of Indian history

Events in the year 1916 in India.

== Incumbents ==
- Emperor of India – George V
- Viceroy of India – Charles Hardinge, 1st Baron Hardinge of Penshurst
- Viceroy of India – Frederic Thesiger, 1st Viscount Chelmsford (from 4 April)

== Events ==
- National income - ₹17,087 million
- Indian National Congress Party hammer out an alliance – the Lucknow Pact – with All-India Muslim League

== Law ==
- Indian Medical Degrees Act
- Hindu Disposition of Property Act

== Births ==
- 13 February – Jagjit Singh Aurora, military commander (died 2005).
- 21 March – Bismillah Khan, shehnai musician and Bharat Ratna winner (died 2006).
- 23 March – Harkishan Singh Surjeet, former General Secretary of the Communist Party of India (Marxist) (died 2008).
- 22 April – Kanan Devi, actress and singer (died 1992).
- 8 May – Chinmayananda, spiritual leader (died 1993).
- 16 September – M. S. Subbulakshmi, Carnatic singer (died 2004).
- 25 September – Deen Dayal Upadhyaya, RSS (died 1968)
- 10 October – Samar Sen, Marxist poet (died 1987)
- 20 November – Hamida Habibullah, politician (d. 2018)
- 12 December - Maharaj Charan Singh, Fourth Satguru of Radha Soami Satsang Beas (died 1 June 1990).
