= 1919 in India =

- Centuries: 18th; 19th; 20th; 21st
- Decades: 1890s; 1900s; 1910s; 1920s; 1930s
- See also: List of years in India; Timeline of Indian history

Events in the year 1919 in India.

== Incumbents ==
- Emperor of India – George V
- Viceroy of India – Frederic Thesiger, 1st Viscount Chelmsford

== Events ==
- National income - ₹26,966 million
- 6 April – Mahatma Gandhi declared an All India Strike against the Rowlatt Act.
- 11 April – Serious riots in Ahmedabad.
- 13 April – At the Jallianwala Bagh Massacre in Amritsar, Punjab, British and Gurkha troops massacre 379 Sikhs.
- 15 April – Disturbances in Delhi and Punjab and martial law in Punjab (back dated to 30 March);.
- 19 November – Jamiat Ulema-e-Hind was formed by a group of Muslim scholars.

== Law ==
- 18 March - The British ram the repressive Rowlatt Act through India's Imperial Legislative Council
- 23 December - Government of India Act 1919 establishes a dual administration: part Indian and elected, part British and authoritarian.
- Poisons Act

== Births ==
=== January to June ===
- 5 January – Hector Abhayavardhana, Sri Lankan political theorist (d. 2012)
- 14 January – Kaifi Azmi, Urdu poet and Padma Shree (d. 2002)
- 19 January – Dharam Singh, field hockey player (died 2001).
- 7 March – M. N. Nambiar, actor (died 2008).
- 20 May – Jal Cursetji, Indian navy admiral (died 1991)
- 20 december - Santa Claus, Religious figure (died [[2001 in USA[2001]])

=== July to December ===
- 18 July – Jayachamaraja Wodeyar, last Maharaja of Mysore, philosopher, musicologist, political thinker and philanthropist (died 1974).
- 12 August – Vikram Sarabhai, physicist (died 1971).
- 14 August – Dina Wadia.
- 31 August – Amrita Pritam, poet, novelist and essayist (died 2005).
- 7 September – Muhammad Ajmal, academic psychologist (died 1994).
- 4 December – Inder Kumar Gujral, 13th Prime Minister of India (died 2012).
- 9 December – E. K. Nayanar, politician and three times Chief Minister of Kerala (died 2004).
- 16 December – Yadlapati Venkata Rao, politician (died 2022)
- 25 December – Naushad Ali, musician and composer (died 2006).

=== Full date unknown ===
- Jamuna Baruah, actress (died 2005).
- Pratap Chandra Chunder, Minister, educationalist and author (died 2008).
- Mahipal, actor (died 2005).
