= 1993 in India =

- Centuries: 18th; 19th; 20th; 21st
- Decades: 1970s; 1980s; 1990s; 2000s; 2010s
- See also: List of years in India; Timeline of Indian history

Events in the year 1993 in the Republic of India.

== Incumbents ==
- President of India – Shankar Dayal Sharma
- Prime Minister of India – P. V. Narasimha Rao
- Vice President of India – K. R. Narayanan
- Chief Justice of India – Lalit Mohan Sharma until 11 February, Manepalli Narayana Rao Venkatachaliah

=== Governors ===
- Andhra Pradesh – Krishan Kant
- Arunachal Pradesh – Surendranath Dwivedy (until 4 July), Madhukar Dighe (4 July-20 October), Mata Prasad (starting 20 October)
- Assam – Loknath Mishra
- Bihar – Mohammad Shafi Qureshi (until 13 August), Akhlaqur Rahman Kidwai (starting 13 August)
- Goa – Bhanu Prakash Singh
- Gujarat – Sarup Singh
- Haryana – Dhanik Lal Mandal
- Himachal Pradesh –
  - until 29 January: Virendra Verma
  - 11 February-29 June: Bali Ram Bhagat
  - starting 11 February: Gulsher Ahmad
- Jammu and Kashmir – Girish Chandra Saxena (until 12 March), K. V. Krishna Rao (starting 12 March)
- Karnataka – Khurshed Alam Khan
- Kerala – B. Rachaiah
- Madhya Pradesh – M. A. Khan (until 23 June), Mohammad Shafi Qureshi (starting 23 June)
- Maharashtra – C. Subramaniam (until 9 January), P.C. Alexander (starting 12 January)
- Manipur –
  - until 19 March: Chintamani Panigrahi
  - 20 March-30 August: K. V. Raghunatha Reddy
  - starting 31 August: V. K. Nayar
- Meghalaya – Madhukar Dighe
- Mizoram – Swaraj Kaushal (until 9 February), P. R. Kyndiah (starting 9 February)
- Nagaland – Loknath Mishra (until 1 October), V. K. Nayar (starting 1 October)
- Odisha –
  - until 1 February: Yagya Dutt Sharma
  - 1 February-31 May: Saiyid Nurul Hasan
  - starting 1 June: B. Satya Narayan Reddy
- Punjab – Surendra Nath
- Rajasthan –
  - until 31 May: Marri Chenna Reddy
  - 31 May-30 June: Dhanik Lal Mandal
  - starting 30 June: Bali Ram Bhagat
- Sikkim – Radhakrishna Hariram Tahiliani
- Tamil Nadu – Bhishma Narain Singh (until 30 May), Marri Chenna Reddy (starting 31 May)
- Tripura – K. V. Raghunatha Reddy (until 14 August), Romesh Bhandari (starting 14 August)
- Uttar Pradesh – B. Satya Narayan Reddy (until 25 May), Motilal Vora (starting 25 May)
- West Bengal –
  - until 12 July: Saiyid Nurul Hasan
  - 12 July-14 August: B. Satyanarayan Reddy
  - starting 14 August: K. V. Raghunatha Reddy

== Events ==
- National income - ₹8,759,924 million
- 9 March – The All Parties Hurriyat Conference is formed in Kashmir.
- 12 March – 1993 Mumbai blasts: A series of bomb blasts, thought to be planted by underworld figures, rock the country's commercial capital of Bombay, killing some 260 people.
- 9 April – Veerappan Gang Trapped and blew a Tamil Nadu bus carrying police, forest officials and civilians, using a landmine, which killed 22 civilians and police[11] and this incident is known as Palar blast.
- 14 April – Sun TV, a Tamil language television station, as first regular broadcasting service to start in Chennai, Tamil Nadu.
- 10 May - Impeachment motion against Justice V. Ramaswami failed in Lok Sabha.
- 24 May - Veerappan and his gang Killed 6 policemen K.M.Uthappa, Prabhakara, Poovaiah, Machaiah, Swamy and Narasappa of STF commander Gopal Hosur's party and injured the police commander near Rangaswamy vaddu, M.M.Hills, Karnataka.
- 3 June - Chief minister of Kerala K. Karunakaran gravely injured following a road accident.
- 21 July - 1993 Kolkata firing
- 29 July - Disappearance of Chekannur Maulavi a reformist. He was allegedly kidnapped and killed and is considered as first act of Islamic terrorism in Malabar Coast post independence.
- 30 September – The 6.2 M_{w} Latur earthquake shakes Maharashtra, India with a maximum Mercalli intensity of VIII (Severe) killing 9,748 and injuring 30,000.
- 5 December -Mulayam Singh Yadav elected chief minister of Uttar Pradesh for the second time.

== Law ==
Supreme Court recognised a fundamental right to primary education in the right to life under article 21.

== Births ==
- 6 January – Pawan Negi, cricketer.
- 11 March – Manjima Mohan, actress
- 15 March – Alia Bhatt, actress and model.
- 11 May - Chitra Shukla, actress
- 25 May - Rahul Yadav, chartered accountant.
- 1 April – Sri Divya, actress.
- 2 May – Gayathrie Shankar, actress.
- 1 June - Rajat Patidar, cricketer
- 26 June - Shivam Dube, cricketer
- 27 June - Prajakta Koli, YouTuber
- 25 July – Pradeep Ranganathan, film director and actor.
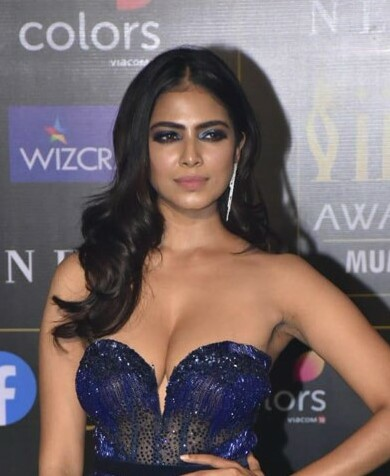
- Malavika Mohanan
  4 August – Malavika Mohanan, actress
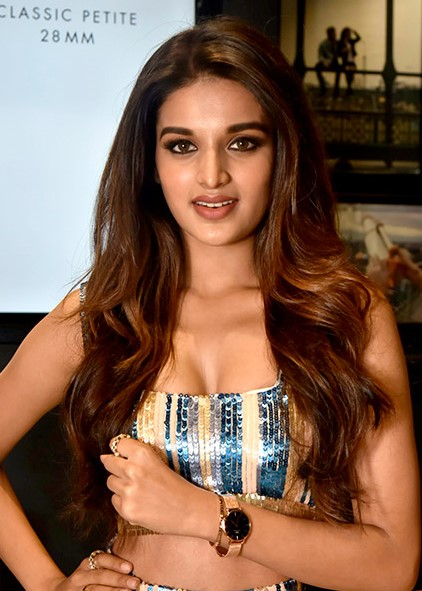
- Nidhhi Agerwal
  17 August – Nidhi Agerwal, actress
- 3 October – K. S. Bharat, cricketer
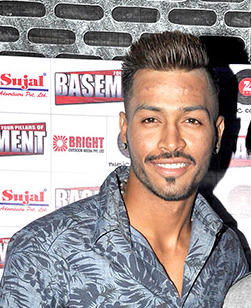
- Hardik Pandya
  11 October – Hardik Pandya, cricketer
- 12 October – Mukesh Kumar, cricketer
- 13 October – Hanuma Vihari, cricketer
- 30 October – Aditi Rathore, Indian television actress
- 6 December – Jasprit Bumrah, cricketer
- 16 December – Kalidas Jayaram, actor

== Deaths ==
- 5 April – Divya Bharti, actress (born 1974).
- 9 June – Satyen Bose, film director (born 1916).
- 12 June – Binay Ranjan Sen, diplomat, Director General of the Food and Agriculture Organization (born 1898).
- 3 August – Chinmayananda, spiritual leader (born 1916).
- 19 August – Utpal Dutt, actor, director and writer (born 1929).
- 7 November - Kirupanandha Variyar, spiritual teacher (born 1906).
- 29 November – J. R. D. Tata, French-born Indian aviator and businessman who became India's first licensed pilot (born 1904).

=== Full date unknown ===
- Arun Joshi, novelist (born 1939).

== See also ==
- Bollywood films of 1993
