= Jacob Lalrawngbawla =

Indian footballer

Personal information
- Date of birth: 8 June 1995 (age 31)
- Place of birth: Tlungvel, Mizoram, India
- Height: 1.67 m (5 ft 5 1/2 in)
- Position: Midfielder

Team information
- Current team: Shillong Lajong
- Number: 14

Youth career
- 2010–2012: Shillong Lajong

Senior career*
| Years | Team | Apps | (Gls) |
| 2012– | Shillong Lajong | 27 | (0) |

International career
| 2013 | India U19 | 0 | (0) |
- * Club domestic league appearances and goals as of 20 February 2016

Jacob Lalrawngbawla (born 8 June 1995) is an Indian football player playing for Shillong Lajong in the I-League in India as a midfielder.

== Career ==
=== Shillong Lajong ===
Jacob is a youth product of Shillong Lajong. He joined the youth set up in 2010. A talented youngster, Jacob was selected for a training camp in FC Bayern Munich in July 2011. Impressive performances saw him graduate to the senior team at the start of 2012–13 season along with two other academy boys. He made his professional debut on 12 October 2012 at the age of 17 when he came on as a substitute in an I-League game against Salgaocar F.C. Shillong Lajong coach Des Bulpin has hailed Jacob Lalrawngbawla as a "brilliant talent."
