= 1926 in India =

- Centuries: 18th; 19th; 20th; 21st
- Decades: 1900s; 1910s; 1920s; 1930s; 1940s
- See also: List of years in India; Timeline of Indian history

Events in the year 1926 in India.

== Incumbents ==
- Emperor of India – George V
- Viceroy of India – The Earl of Reading
- Viceroy of India – The Lord Irwin (from 3 April)

== Events ==
- National income - ₹33,374 million
- 15 July – BEST buses make its debut in Bombay.
- 24 November – Sri Aurobindo retires, leaving Mirra Alfassa to run the Sri Aurobindo Ashram in Pondicherry.
- 31 December - King George V names the new capital city as New Delhi.

=== Dates not known ===
- April – Hindu-Muslim strike in Calcutta.
- October - November - 1926 Indian general election
- December - 41st session of All India Congress Committee held at Guwahati presided over by Tarun Ram Phukan

== Law ==
- 1 October − Public Service Commission established, it was later reconstituted as Federal Public Service Commission by the Government of India Act 1935 only to be renamed as today's Union Public Service Commission after the independence.
- Trade Unions Act
- Good Conduct Prisoners Probational Release Act
- Indian Bar Councils Act
- Cotton Industry (Statistics) Act

== Births ==
=== January to June ===
- 8 January – Kelucharan Mohapatra, Odissi dancer and guru (died 2004).
- 16 January – O. P. Nayyar, film music director and composer (died 2007).
- 20 January
  - Jamiluddin Aali, poet, critic, playwright, essayist, columnist, and scholar. (died 2015)
  - Qurratulain Hyder, novelist and short story writer, academic and journalist (died 2007).
- 21 January – Laxman Pai, artist (died 2021)
- 26 May – Sukumar Azhikode, teacher, critic and orator. (died 2012)
- 6 June – Sunil Dutt, Bollywood actor and producer (died 2005)

=== July to December ===
- 21 July – Rahimuddin Khan, Pakistani general and politician (died 2022 in Pakistan).
- 15 August – Sukanta Bhattacharya, poet (died 1947).
- 3 September – Uttam Kumar, actor (died 1980).
- 8 October – Raaj Kumar, actor (died 1996).
- 31 October - Narinder Singh Kapany, physicist (died 2020).
- 21 November – Prem Nath, actor (died 1992).
- 23 November - Sathya Sai Baba, guru, philanthropist, educator (died 2011).
- 26 November – Yash Pal, scientist and educator.
- 11 December - Shanti Devi, reincarnation research (died 1987)
- 31 December – Zahoor Qasim, marine scientist.

=== Full date unknown ===
- J. P. Chandrababu, comedian-actor, singer and dancer (died 1974).
- Nalini Jaywant, actress.

== Deaths ==
- 23 December - Swami Shraddhanand, Arya Samaj (b.1856)
