= 1913 in India =

- Centuries: 18th; 19th; 20th; 21st
- Decades: 1890s; 1900s; 1910s; 1920s; 1930s
- See also: List of years in India; Timeline of Indian history

Events in the year 1913 in India.

== Incumbents ==
- Emperor of India – George V
- Viceroy of India – Charles Hardinge, 1st Baron Hardinge of Penshurst

== Events ==
- National income - ₹13,473 million
- 3 May- Raja Harischandra, First full-length movie of India released. Beginning of Indian Film Industry.
- 6 November – Mohandas Gandhi is arrested while leading a march of Indian miners in South Africa.
- Rabindranath Tagore (1861–1941), Bengali poet, got the Nobel Prize in Literature for his book of lyrics called Gitanjali translated into English by himself.

Ghadar party foundation

== Law ==
- Official Trustees Act
- White Phosphorus Matches Prohibition Act

== Births ==
- 5 March – Gangubai Hangal, Indian singer of the khyal genre of Hindustani classical music (died July y 25, 2009).
- 1 May – Balraj Sahni, Indian actor (died 13 April 1973)
- 29 march Bhawani Prasad Mishra – a great poet of Hindi
- 1 July PP Kumaramangalam, Chief of the Army Staff of Indian Army (08 Jun 1966 to 07 Jun 1969) (died 2000).
- 18 July – N. Krishnaswami Reddy, lawyer (died 2002).
- 27 July – Kalpana Datta, Communist freedom fighter (died 1995).
- 1 August – Bhagwan Dada, actor and film director (died 2002).
- 13 August – Chandrakant Mandare, actor and artist (died 2001).
- 20 October – Attia Hosain, writer, feminist and broadcaster (died 1998).
- 3 November – Antony Mitradas, film director (died 2017).

== Deaths ==
- Devaki Nandan Khatri, first author of mystery novels in Hindi (born 1861).
