= 1915 in India =

- Centuries: 18th; 19th; 20th; 21st
- Decades: 1890s; 1900s; 1910s; 1920s; 1930s
- See also: List of years in India; Timeline of Indian history

== Incumbents ==
- Emperor of India – George V
- Viceroy of India – Charles Hardinge, 1st Baron Hardinge of Penshurst

== Events ==
- National income - ₹13,313 million
- Mohandas Karamchand Gandhi returns to India from South Africa to spearhead the Indian independence movement.
- Calcutta School of Music is established by Phillpe Sandre.

The Home Rule League is founded by Annie Besant (it was formally launched in 1916).

== Law ==
- Sir Jamsetjee Jejeebhoy Baronetcy Act
- Banaras Hindu University Act
- Government Of India Act

== Births ==
- 6 March – Syedna Mohammed Burhanuddin, religious head (died 2014).
- 11 March – Vijay Hazare, cricketer (died 2004).
- 13 March – Protiva Bose, writer (died 2006)
- 26 July – Sri K. Pattabhi Jois, yoga teacher (died 2009).
- 15 August – Ismat Chughtai, writer (died 1991).
- 31 August – Mir Ali Ahmed Khan Talpur Prominent political figure and former Federal Minister for defense Government of Pakistan (died 1987 in London)
- Baji Jamalunnisa – Indian freedom fighter (died 2016)
- 17 September – M. F. Husain, artist.

== Deaths ==
- 19 February – Gopala Krishna Gokhale, politician
- 5 November - Pherozeshah Mehta, politician
- 20 December - Upendrakishore Ray Chowdhury, writer and pioneer in half-tone printing
