= 1923 in India =

- Centuries: 18th; 19th; 20th; 21st
- Decades: 1900s; 1910s; 1920s; 1930s; 1940s
- See also: List of years in India; Timeline of Indian history

Events in the year 1923 in India.

== Incumbents ==
- Emperor of India – George V
- Viceroy of India – The Earl of Reading

== Events ==
- National income - ₹29,403 million
- Jan 1 - The Swaraj Party was established by CR Das and Motilal Nehru
- The Madras Province Swarajya Party was established under the leadership of S. Sathyamurthy and S. Srinivasa Iyengar.
- May 1 – Rahula College is established in Ceylon, under the name of "Parakramabhahu Vidyalaya".
- Nov, 1923 - General Elections held
- Agitation against separate dining and prayer halls for Brahmins and Non-Brahmins in Gurukulam ran by V. V. S. Aiyar at Cheranmadevi.

== Law ==
- Workmen Compensation Act
- Official Secrets Act
- Indian Boilers Act
- Cantonments (House-Accommodation) Act
- Indian Naval Armament Act
- Indian Merchant Shipping Act
- Cotton Transport Act

== Births ==
- 4 January – Mohan Lall Shrimal, chief justice of Sikkim
- 10 March – Ranjit Lal Jetley, soldier and scientist (died 2018)
- 21 March – Nirmala Srivastava, founder of Sahaja Yoga (died 2011)
- 5 April – M. Sarada Menon, psychiatrist and social worker (died 2021)
- 14 May – Mrinal Sen, producer of Bollywood films (died 2018)
- 15 May – Johnny Walker, actor of Bollywood films (died 2003)
- 23 May – Ranajit Guha, historian (died 2023)
- 28 May – N. T. Rama Rao, actor, director, producer, and politician (died 1996)
- 9 June – Idris Hasan Latif, chief of the Air Staff (died 2018)
- 17 June – Sukh Dev, chemist (died 2024)
- 9 July – Kovilan, novelist. (died 2010)
- 22 July – Mukesh, playback singer (died 1976).
- 28 July – H. S. S. Lawrence, educationalist
- 1 September – Habib Tanvir, playwright, theatre director, poet and actor (died 2009)
- 16 September – Ki. Rajanarayanan, folklorist and writer (died 2021)
- 26 September – Dev Anand, actor and film producer (died 2011)
- 26 October – Ram Prakash Gupta, Chief Minister of Uttar Pradesh and governor of Madhya Pradesh (died 2004)
- 9 November – Keshub Mahindra, businessman (died 2023)
- 25 December – Swami Satyananda Saraswati, founder of Satyananda Yoga and Bihar Yoga (died 2009)

== Deaths ==
- 10 September – Sukumar Ray, Bengali writer (born 1887)
