= 1995 in India =

- Centuries: 18th; 19th; 20th; 21st
- Decades: 1970s; 1980s; 1990s; 2000s; 2010s
- See also: List of years in India; Timeline of Indian history

Events in the year 1995 in the Republic of India.

== Incumbents ==
- President of India – Shankar Dayal Sharma
- Prime Minister of India – P. V. Narasimha Rao
- Vice President of India – K. R. Narayanan
- Chief Justice of India – Aziz Mushabber Ahmadi

=== Governors ===
- Andhra Pradesh – Krishan Kant
- Arunachal Pradesh – Mata Prasad
- Assam – Loknath Mishra
- Bihar – Akhlaqur Rahman Kidwai
- Goa – Gopala Ramanujam (until 15 June), Romesh Bhandari (starting 16 June)
- Gujarat – Sarup Singh (until 1 July), Naresh Chandra (starting 1 July)
- Haryana – Dhanik Lal Mandal (starting 13 June), Mahabir Prasad (starting 14 June)
- Himachal Pradesh –** until 17 September: Sudhakarrao Naik
  - 17 September-16 November: Mahabir Prasad
  - starting 16 November: Sheila Kaul
- Jammu and Kashmir – K. V. Krishna Rao
- Karnataka – Khurshed Alam Khan
- Kerala – B. Rachaiah (until 9 November), P. Shiv Shankar (starting 9 November)
- Madhya Pradesh – Mohammad Shafi Qureshi
- Maharashtra – P.C. Alexander
- Manipur – O. N. Shrivastava
- Meghalaya – Madhukar Dighe (until 18 June), M. M. Jacob (starting 18 June)
- Mizoram – P. R. Kyndiah
- Nagaland – O. N. Shrivastava
- Odisha – B. Satya Narayan Reddy (until 17 June), Gopala Ramanujam (starting 17 June)
- Punjab – Bakshi Krishan Nath Chhibber
- Rajasthan – Bali Ram Bhagat
- Sikkim – P. Shiv Shankar (until 11 November), K. V. Raghunatha Reddy (starting 11 November)
- Tamil Nadu – Marri Chenna Reddy
- Tripura – Romesh Bhandari (until 15 June), Siddheswar Prasad (starting 15 June)
- Uttar Pradesh – Motilal Vora
- West Bengal – K. V. Raghunatha Reddy

== Events ==
- National income - ₹12,055,827 million
- 1 January - India joins the World Trade Organization (WTO) which has replaced GATT.
- 5 March – Delhi Metro Rail Corporation Limited founded.
- 27 April - Gangster Auto Shankar hanged to death in Central Prison, Salem, Tamil Nadu.
- 2 July - Tandoor Murder of Delhi took place.
- 14 August – Internet is officially launched by VSNL.
- 31 August – Punjab Chief Minister Beant Singh is assassinated.
- 21 September – Reports of the Hindu milk miracle surface.
- 20 October – Hindi movie Dilwale Dulhania Le Jayenge released the longest running Hindi movie.
- November
  - Bombay renames as Mumbai
  - Hindi song Q-Funk becomes one of the biggest hit remix songs.
- 17 December – Purulia arms drop case
- 18 December–26 December – The South Asian Games take place in Madras.
- 23 December – Nearly 425 people die when a blaze rips through a school prize-giving ceremony in the northern town of Dabwali in Haryana state, near the Indian capital.

=== Dates unknown ===
- Hajj pilgrimage through sea routes from India stopped following the ageing of vessel MV Akbari.

== Births ==
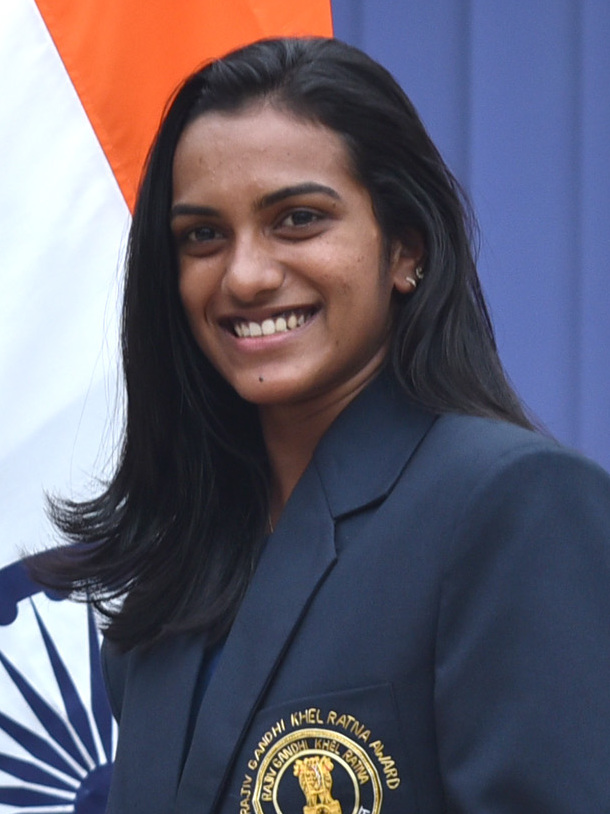
- P. V. Sindhu
  25 January – Mandeep Singh, field hockey player
- 5 March – Tanvi Ganesh Lonkar, actress
- 10 March – Bipin Singh, footballer
- 26 March – Anshuman Joshi, actor
- 29 April – K. Maneesha, badminton player
- 5 May – Alen Deory, footballer.
- 10 May – Mirnalini Ravi, actress.
- 6 June – Sadi Jalali, soccer player
- 8 June – Jacob Lalrawngbawla, footballer
- 9 June – PU Chitra, track and field athlete
- 16 June – Sheena Bajaj, actress known as Dolly from Best of Luck Nikki
- 5 July – Pusarla Venkata Sindhu, badminton player
- 7 July – Anamika Choudhari, singer
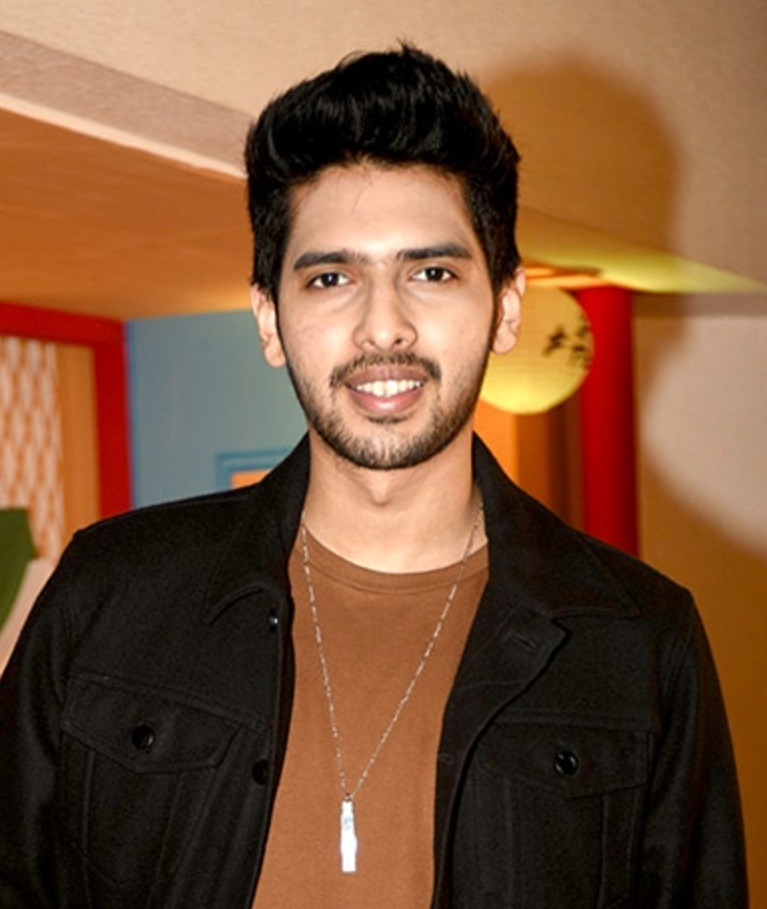
- Armaan Malik
  22 July – Armaan Malik, singer
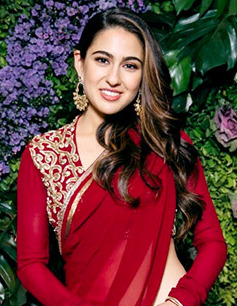
- Sara Ali Khan
  12 August – Sara Ali Khan, actress
- 21 August – Anu Sithara, Actress
- 28 August – Viraat Badhwar, Australian amateur golfer
- 7 September – Sahaj Grover, chess player
- 9 September – Rahul Kumar, actor
- 10 September – Aparna Das, actress.
- 11 September – Aparna Balamurali, actress.
- 11 September – Samyuktha Menon, actress.
- 15 October – Niveda Thomas, actress
- 26 October – Megha Akash, actress
- 5 November – Mehreen Pirzada, actress
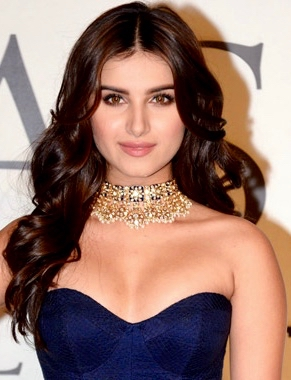
- Tara Sutaria
  19 November – Tara Sutaria, actress, dancer, singer and TV host
- 22 December – Shivam Sai Gupta, visual effect producer and game developer
- 28 December – J. Meghana, badminton player

== Deaths ==
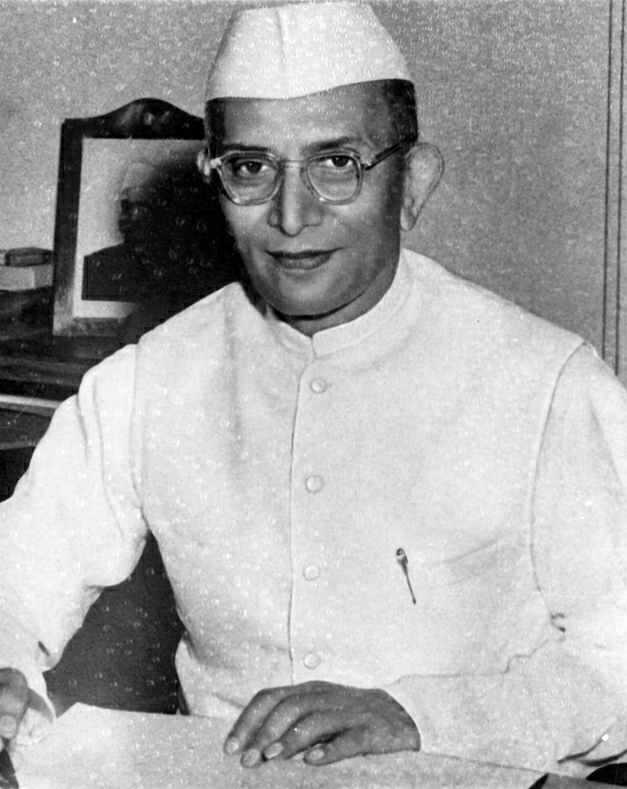
- Morarji Desai
  10 April – Morarji Desai, independence activist and 4th Prime Minister of India (born 1896).
- 21 August – Subrahmanyan Chandrasekhar, astrophysicist and joint Nobel Prize in Physics winner (born 1910).

== See also ==
- Bollywood films of 1995
