= Chekannur Maulavi =

Indian Islamic scholar who went missing (born 1936)

- Born: Chekannur P. K. Mohammed Abul Hassan; 1936; Chekannur, Malappuram, Kerala, India
- Disappeared: 29 July 1993 (aged 56–57)
- Status: Missing for 33 years, 2 months and 25 days
- Occupation: Islamic cleric
- Organization: Quran Sunnath Society

Chekannur P. K. Mohammed Abul Hassan Maulavi (born 1936), better known as Chekannur Maulavi, was an Indian religious leader from Chekannur, Malappuram district of Kerala. He founded the Quran Sunnath Society. He disappeared on 29 July 1993. His death is uncertain.

== Views ==
Maulavi had argued that Islamic requirement for salat is only thrice daily rather than five times a day, which caused controversy in Kerala. He had also argued that Quran alone is "true" and hadiths cannot be taken for granted, a statement which was lambasted by the Islamic clergy.

== Disappearance and investigation ==
The CBI took over the case in 1996, and in 2000 arrested two members of the ultra orthodox Muslim sect under suspicion of murder.

The case was hampered by the disappearance of several witnesses, whose property was seized when they fled abroad rather than appear to testify in 2008.

Mohammed's wife filed a petition seeking to arraign A.P. Aboobacker Musaliyar as a murder suspect through her lawyer, Advocate S.K. Premraj which was allowed. The court had found that Mohammed's body was disposed of in some mysterious manner so as never to be recovered, which was dismissed by High Court later

A Decision Bench of the Kerala High Court in 2018 acquitted the first accused. With this, all accused in the case, including the first accused V. V. Hamsa, who had been sentenced to two terms of life imprisonment in 2010 have been let off. Even Chekannur Moulavi's death could not be proved.

== In popular culture ==
His disappearance is the subject of a 2009 documentary, Ore Oru Chekannur.

== See also ==
- List of people who disappeared mysteriously (2000–present)
- List of unsolved murders (1980–1999)
