= Tlungvel =

- village
- Location in Mizoram, India Tlungvel (India)
- Coordinates: 23°36′25.76″N 92°51′04.54″E
- Country: India
- State: Mizoram
- District: Aizawl

Population (2011)
  - Total: 2,529

Languages
  - Official: Mizo
- Time zone: UTC+5:30 (IST)
- PIN: 796161
- Telephone code: 91 389
- Vehicle registration: MZ-09
- Nearest city: Aizawl
- Climate: Moderate (Köppen)

Tlungvel is a large village located in Thingsulthliah Block of Aizawl district, Mizoram.

== Demographics ==
In Tlungvel the population of children with age 0-6 is 339 which makes up 13.40% of total population of village. Average Sex Ratio of Tlungvel is 1043 which is higher than Mizoram state average of 976. Child Sex Ratio for Tlungvel as per census is 994, higher than Mizoram average of 970.

== Literacy ==
Tlungvel village has higher literacy rate compared to Mizoram. In 2011, literacy rate of Tlungvel was 97.17% compared to 91.33% of Mizoram. In Tlungvel Male literacy stands at 96.72% while female literacy rate was 97.59%.
