= 1994 anti-Urdu riots =

Anti-Urdu riots are series of clashes that erupted in and around Bangalore from 7 October 1994. Clashes took place at Jagajeevanram Nagar neighborhood in Bengaluru, Karnataka, India.

It also spread to many areas claiming 23 lives, injuries to more than 150 and losses of property worth more than 10 million US dollar.

== Background ==
The riots were believed to be a reaction against a ten-minute telecast of Urdu news on India's national television channel, Doordarshan at prime-time. Bharatiya Janata Party and Janata Dal (Secular) claimed was a political stunt by chief minister Veerappa Moily to gain political support among Muslims, which Moily denied and countered to by claiming they had attempted to communalize the broadcast. The riots stopped following decision to discontinue the news bulletin.

== See also ==
- 1991 Anti-Tamil violence of Karnataka
- 2020 Bangalore riots

== Notes ==
- Nair, Janaki (2005). The promise of the metropolis: Bangalore's twentieth century. Oxford University Press. p. 259. ISBN 0195667255.
