= Parvathy Soman =

Indian singer (born 1997)

- Born: 22 April 1997 (age 28)
- Origin: Edappally, Ernakulam, Kerala
- Occupation: Playback singer
- Instrument: Vocals

Parvathy Soman (born 22 April 1997) is an Indian singer. She is best known as a playback singer in Malayalam films. She sings in Malayalam devotional album songs. Parvathy's career began when she won the Munch Star Singer Junior contest.

== Biography ==
Parvathy was born on 22 April 1997 to a Malayali Hindu family in Ernakulam, Kerala. She grew up in Edappally, a town near Ernakulam. Her father, Mr. Somashekharan Nair, works as an Income tax officer and her mother, Anitha Soman, is a home maker. Parvathy was trained in classical music in Ernakulam with Chandramana Narayanan Namboothiri. As a child, she participated in the children's special reality show Super Star Junior 2 contest on the Amrita Television channel.

She has sung in many Malayalam films. Some of them are Palunku, Oruvan, Colours, Kerala Cafe, and finally she sang a song "Swapnam.." in the Malayalam film Track, that was released in May 2012.
