= 1925 in India =

- Centuries: 18th; 19th; 20th; 21st
- Decades: 1900s; 1910s; 1920s; 1930s; 1940s
- See also: List of years in India; Timeline of Indian history

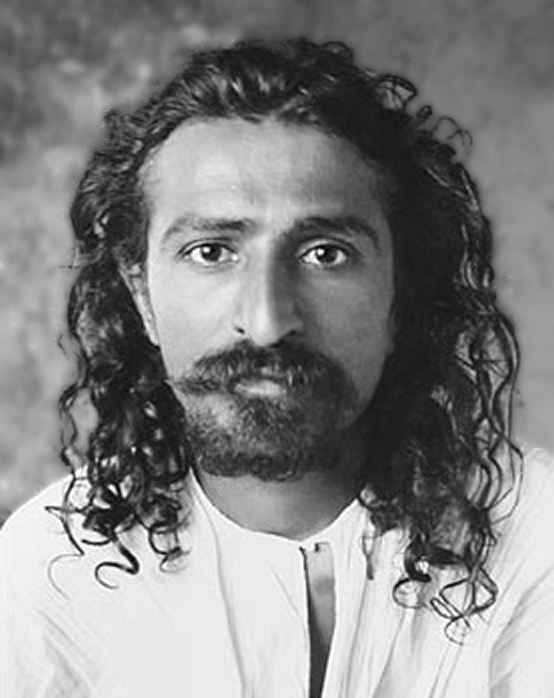
Meher Baba in 1925

Events in the year 1925 in India.

== Incumbents ==
- Emperor of India – George V
- Viceroy of India – The Earl of Reading

== Events ==
- National income - ₹31,179 million
- 3 February – The first ever electric train of India completes its journey from Victoria Terminus to Kurla on the Central Line (Mumbai Suburban Railway).
- 9 March – 1 May Pink's War; RAF operations against tribesmen in Waziristan
- 12 March - Meeting and dialogue between Mahatma Gandhi and Narayana Guru.
- 16 June - Chittaranjan Das dies
- 27 September - Rashtriya Swayamsevak Sangh is founded.
- 22 November - Periyar walks out of Congress in Provincial Conference held at Kanchipuram due to non-acceptances of resolution brought against Caste discrimination.
- 23 November - Vaikom Satyagraha ends with opening of all entrances of Vaikom Sree Mahadeva Temple except the East one for all castes.
- 26 December – Communist Party of India is founded at Kanpur.
- Dyarchy suspended in Bengal.

== Law ==
- Indian Succession Act
- Indian Carriage of Goods by Sea Act
- Sikh Gurdwaras (Supplementary) Act
- Indian Soldiers (Litigation) Act
- Provident Funds Act
- Coal Grading Board Act
- Cotton Ginning and Pressing Factories Act

== Births ==
- 1 January – Wahiduddin Khan, religious scholar and peace activist (died 2021)
- 19 January – Pradeep Kumar, actor (died 2001)
- 25 January – Kakarla Subba Rao, radiologist (died 2021)
- 8 May – G. S. Amur, writer and critic (died 2020)
- 9 July – Guru Dutt, film director, producer, and actor (died 1964)
- 22 July
  - Daasarathi Krishnamacharyulu, poet and political activist (died 1987)
  - Govind Talwalkar, journalist (died 2017)
- 7 August – M. S. Swaminathan, agricultural scientist (died 2023)
- 19 August – Madhav Dalvi, cricketer (died 2012)
- 31 August – Aarudhra, author, poet and historian (died 1998)
- 13 September – Namboothiri (died 2023)
- 24 September – Autar Singh Paintal, medical scientist (died 2004)
- 4 November – Ritwik Ghatak, film director (died 1976)
- 29 December – Keshav Dutt, hockey player (died 2021)

=== Full date unknown ===
- A. T. M. Mustafa, lawyer, cricketer and politician (died 1966)
- Raja Ramanna, nuclear scientist (died 2004)

== Deaths ==
- Gokulchandra Nag, writer and artist (born 1895).
- Chittaranjan Das, Freedom activist and leader of Swaraj Party
