= 1918 in India =

- Centuries: 18th; 19th; 20th; 21st
- Decades: 1890s; 1900s; 1910s; 1920s; 1930s
- See also: List of years in India; Timeline of Indian history

Events in the year 1918 in India.

== Incumbents ==
- Emperor of India – George V
- Viceroy of India – Frederic Thesiger, 1st Viscount Chelmsford

== Events ==
- National income - ₹26,105 million
- Oct 15 - Shirdi Sai Baba's death
- 1918 flu pandemic in India
- Kheda Satyagraha

== Law ==
- Usurious Loans Act

== Births ==
- 4 February – Narayan Gangopadhyay, Bengali novelist and short story writer (died 1970)
- 19 August – Shankar Dayal Sharma, 9th president of India (died 1999)

== Deaths ==
- 22 July – Indra Lal Roy, World War I flying ace, killed in action (born 1898)
- 1 October – Gobindachandra Das, Bengali poet (born 1855).
- 15 October – Sai Baba of Shirdi, guru, yogi and fakir (born 1835)
