= 1917 in India =

- Centuries: 18th; 19th; 20th; 21st
- Decades: 1890s; 1900s; 1910s; 1920s; 1930s
- See also: List of years in India; Timeline of Indian history

Events in the year 1917 in India.

== Incumbents ==
- Emperor of India – George V
- Viceroy of India – Frederic Thesiger, 1st Viscount Chelmsford

== Events ==
- National income - ₹20,552 million
- The Indian National Congress demands self-government for India.
- 20 August – The secretary of state for India makes the announcement that British policy in India calls for the gradual development of self-governing institutions and the progressive realization of responsible government.
- Champaran Satyagraha

== Law ==
- Inland Vessels Act
- Post Office Cash Certificates Act
- Destruction of Records Act

== Births ==
- 2 January – K. M. Mathew, newspaper editor (died 2010).
- 17 January – M. G. Ramachandran, Actor, Politician, Former Chief Minister of Tamil Nadu (died 1987).
- 11 February – T. Nagi Reddy, communist politician (died 1976).
- 1 July – Shyam Saran Negi, schoolteacher and the country's first voter (died 2022).
- 11 July – Chandrakant T. Patel, cotton scientist (died 1990).
- 3 September – G. V. Iyer, film director (died 2003).
- 19 November – Indira Gandhi, Prime Minister of India (assassinated 1984).
- 29 December – Ramanand Sagar, film director (died 2005).

== Deaths ==
- 30 June – Dadabhai Naoroji, founder, Indian National Congress and part of the Early Nationalists.
