= 1914 in India =

- Centuries: 18th; 19th; 20th; 21st
- Decades: 1890s; 1900s; 1910s; 1920s; 1930s
- See also: List of years in India; Timeline of Indian history

Events in the year 1914 in India.

== Incumbents ==
- Emperor of India – George V
- Viceroy of India – Charles Hardinge, 1st Baron Hardinge of Penshurst

== Events ==
- National income - ₹12,557 million
- In August India as the British colony sends troops to Europe to participate as the British fighting partner in World War I against Germany. This force was a part of the British Expeditionary Force sent to Belgium. In October they participated in the First Battle of Ypres. Soon more than 1.125 million Indians had volunteered to fight for Britain in the war.
- 23 May – 376 British subjects (340 Sikhs, 12 Hindus and 24 Muslims) of Indian origin arrived at Burrard Inlet, Vancouver on May 23, 1914, from the Indian sub-continent on the ship Komagata Maru (Guru Nanak Jahaz), seeking to enter Canada. Due to the racist immigration policy of the Dominion of Canada, 352 of the passengers were denied entry and forced to depart on July 23, 1914.
- 22 September - India's first recorded Motor car accident occurred in Travancore claiming life of Kerala Varma Valiya Koil Thampuran.
- 30 September - British Indian Army Expeditionary Force A arrives at Marseille for service in the Ypres Salient of the Western Front.
- In September, a mixed division sent to East Africa; in Oct.-Nov. two divisions of infantry and a brigade of cavalry sent to Egypt; Indian forces cooperate with the Japanese at Tsingtao; Indian forces in Mesopotamia from 31 Oct.

== Law ==
- Simla Accord (1914), an agreement concerning the boundaries of India and Tibet
- Destructive Insects and Pests Act

== Births ==
- 13 March – Saroj Dutta, communist leader (died 1971).
- 3 April – Sam Manekshaw, first Field Marshal of the Indian Army (died 2008).
- 22 April – Baldev Raj Chopra, film director and producer (died 2008).
- 14 May – Mir Gul Khan Nasir, Baloch politician and poet (died 1983)
- 7 June – Khwaja Ahmad Abbas, film director, novelist, screenwriter and journalist (died 1987).
- 8 July – Jyoti Basu, communist politician, former Chief Minister of West Bengal (died 2010).
- 15 July – V. K. Rao, Indian Civil Service officer (died 2018)
- 14 September – G. P. Sippy, film producer and director (died 2007).
- 17 September – Lambert Mascarenhas, journalist, freedom activist and writer (died 2021).
- 24 October – Lakshmi Sahgal, independence activist, politician and Minister (died 2012).
- 26 December – Baba Amte, social activist (died 2008).
- 20 October - Acharya Shri Tulsi, 9th Acharya of Jain Shwetambar Terapanth Sect
- 11 December – Gabriel Chiramel, priest, zoologist and author (died 2017).

=== Full date unknown ===
- Sudha Roy, Indian radical leader (died 1987)
- Matthew Pothen Thekaekara, scientist (died 1974).

== Deaths ==
=== Full date unknown ===
- Vasudevanand Saraswati, Saint who is regarded as an incarnation of Lord Dattatreya, (born 1854 in India)
