= 1991 in India =

- Centuries: 18th; 19th; 20th; 21st
- Decades: 1970s; 1980s; 1990s; 2000s; 2010s
- See also: List of years in India; Timeline of Indian history

Events in the year 1991 in the Republic of India.

The year 1991 was a watershed moment in the history of Economy of India. It was the year in which India formally announced its shift towards Liberalization, Privatization and Globalization from hitherto existed Mixed economy that was predominantly a Planned economy.

== Incumbents ==
- President of India – R. Venkataraman
- Prime Minister of India – Chandra Shekhar Singh until 21 June, P. V. Narasimha Rao
- Vice President of India – Shankar Dayal Sharma
- Chief Justice of India –
  - until 24 November – Ranganath Misra
  - 25 November-12 December – Kamal Narain Singh
  - starting 13 December – Madhukar Hiralal Kania

=== Governors ===
- Andhra Pradesh – Krishan Kant
- Arunachal Pradesh –
  - until 16 March: Devi Das Thakur
  - 16 March-25 March: Loknath Mishra
  - starting 25 March: Surendranath Dwivedy
- Assam – Devi Das Thakur (until 17 March), Loknath Mishra (starting 17 March)
- Bihar –
  - until 13 February: Mohammad Saleem
  - 14 February-18 March: B. Satya Narayan Reddy
  - starting 18 March: Mohammad Shafi Qureshi
- Goa – Khurshed Alam Khan (until 17 March), Bhanu Prakash Singh (starting 18 March)
- Gujarat – Sarup Singh
- Haryana – Dhanik Lal Mandal
- Himachal Pradesh – Virendra Verma
- Jammu and Kashmir – Girish Chandra Saxena
- Karnataka – Bhanu Pratap Singh
- Kerala – B. Rachaiah
- Madhya Pradesh – M. A. Khan
- Maharashtra – C. Subramaniam
- Manipur – Chintamani Panigrahi
- Meghalaya – Madhukar Dighe (starting 8 May)
- Mizoram – Swaraj Kaushal
- Nagaland – M. M. Thomas
- Odisha – Yagya Dutt Sharma
- Punjab – Om Prakash Malhotra (until 7 August), Surendra Nath (starting 7 August)
- Rajasthan – Debi Prasad Chattopadhyaya (until 26 August), Sarup Singh (starting 26 August)
- Sikkim – Radhakrishna Hariram Tahiliani
- Tamil Nadu – Surjit Singh Barnala (until 14 February), Bhishma Narain Singh (starting 14 February)
- Tripura – K. V. Raghunatha Reddy
- Uttar Pradesh – B. Satya Narayan Reddy
- West Bengal – Saiyid Nurul Hasan

== Events ==
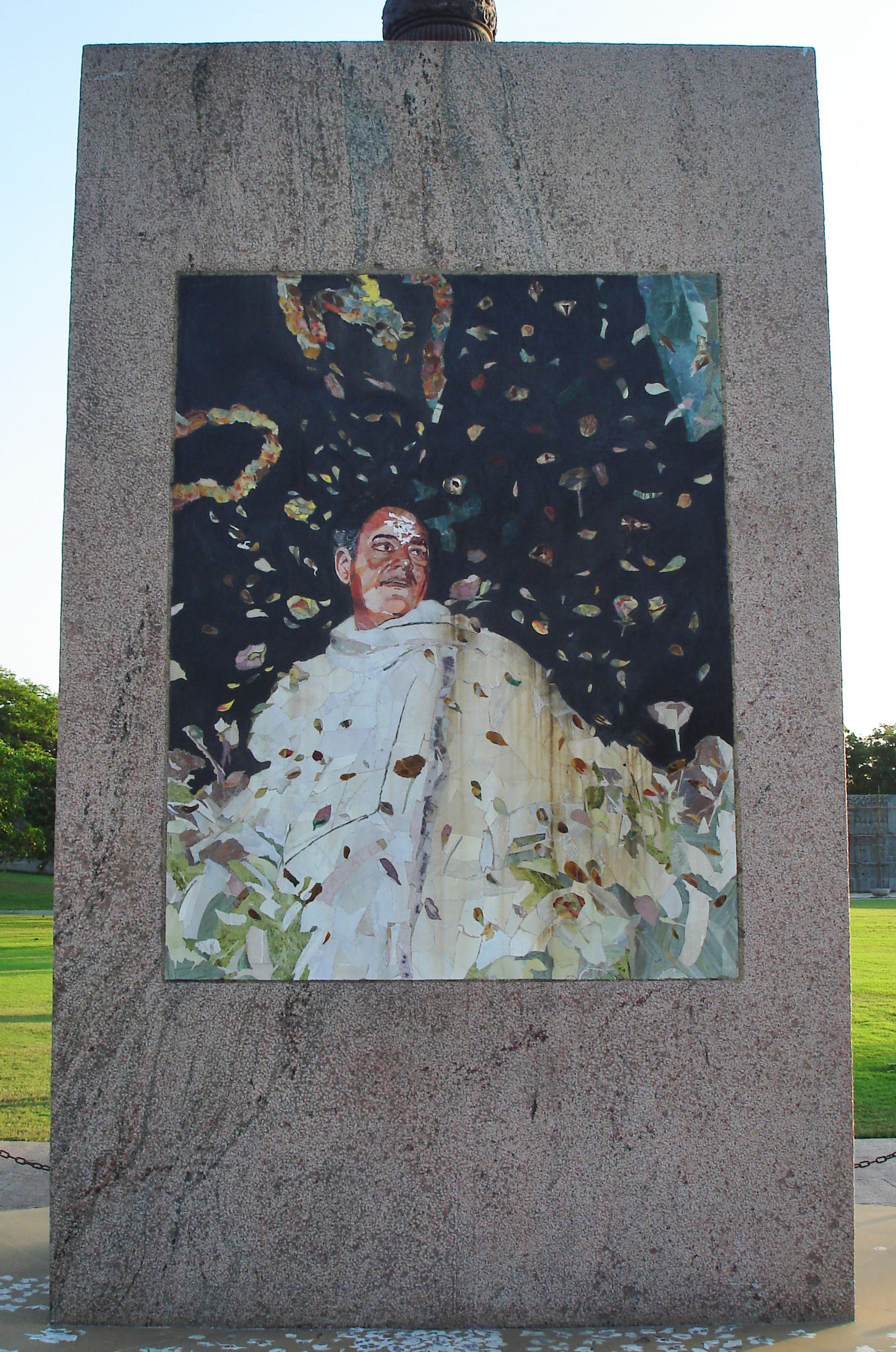
Assassination of Rajiv Gandhi: The stone mosaic that stands at the exact location where Rajiv Gandhi was assassinated in Sriperumbudur

- National income - ₹6,622,605 million
- 1 January - Minister of Civil Aviation Harmohan Dhawan declares Thiruvananthapuram Airport as International airport.
- 6 January – The All India Federation of Anganwadi Workers and Helpers is founded in Udaipur.
- 23 February - Kunan Poshpora incident were 35 women allegedly raped by security forces in Kashmir.
- 21 May – Assassination of Rajiv Gandhi: Former Prime Minister Rajiv Gandhi is assassinated by a Liberation Tigers of Tamil Eelam suicide bomber in Sriperumbudur near Chennai in Tamil Nadu during the election campaign.
- 31 May – The Government of India constitutes the Company Law Board as an independent quasi-judicial body thus giving up direct control on matters of company law.
- 15 June – When the general election results are all compiled, the Congress Party has won a plurality of votes.
- 21 June – Indian National Congress leader P.V. Narasimha Rao becomes Prime Minister.
- 24 June – J. Jayalalithaa is sworn in as chief minister of Tamil Nadu for the first time.
- 24 July – The Government of India announces its New Industrial Policy, marking the start of Economic liberalisation in India.
- 6 August - Tsundur massacre of Dalits in Andhra Pradesh.
- 17 October – 1991 Rudrapur bombings by Sikh separatists, who exploded two bombs, during a Ramlila Hindu celebration in Rudrapur, Uttarakhand, killing 41 people.
- 20 October – The 6.8 M_{w} Uttarkashi earthquake shook northern India with a maximum Mercalli intensity of IX (Violent), killing 768–2,000 and injuring 1,383–1,800.
- October - Shiv Sena workers led by Shishir Shinde vandalised Wankhede Stadium Cricket pitch to stop a cricket match between India and Pakistan.
- 11 December – Rapid Action Force established by Union Home Ministry.
- 12 December - Anti Tamil riots in South Karnataka

== Births ==
- 11 January - Shweta Basu Prasad, actress.
- 26 January – Vijay Shankar, cricketer.
- 16 February – Mayank Agarwal, cricketer.
- 11 March – Poonam Pandey, model.
- 24 March – Krunal Pandya, cricketer.
- 7 May – Gaurav Chaudhary, YouTuber
- 29 June – D. Karthika Anagha, Carnatic classical vocalist.
- 30 June - Jaimin Rajani, singer-songwriter.
- 15 July – Rajisha Vijayan, actress.
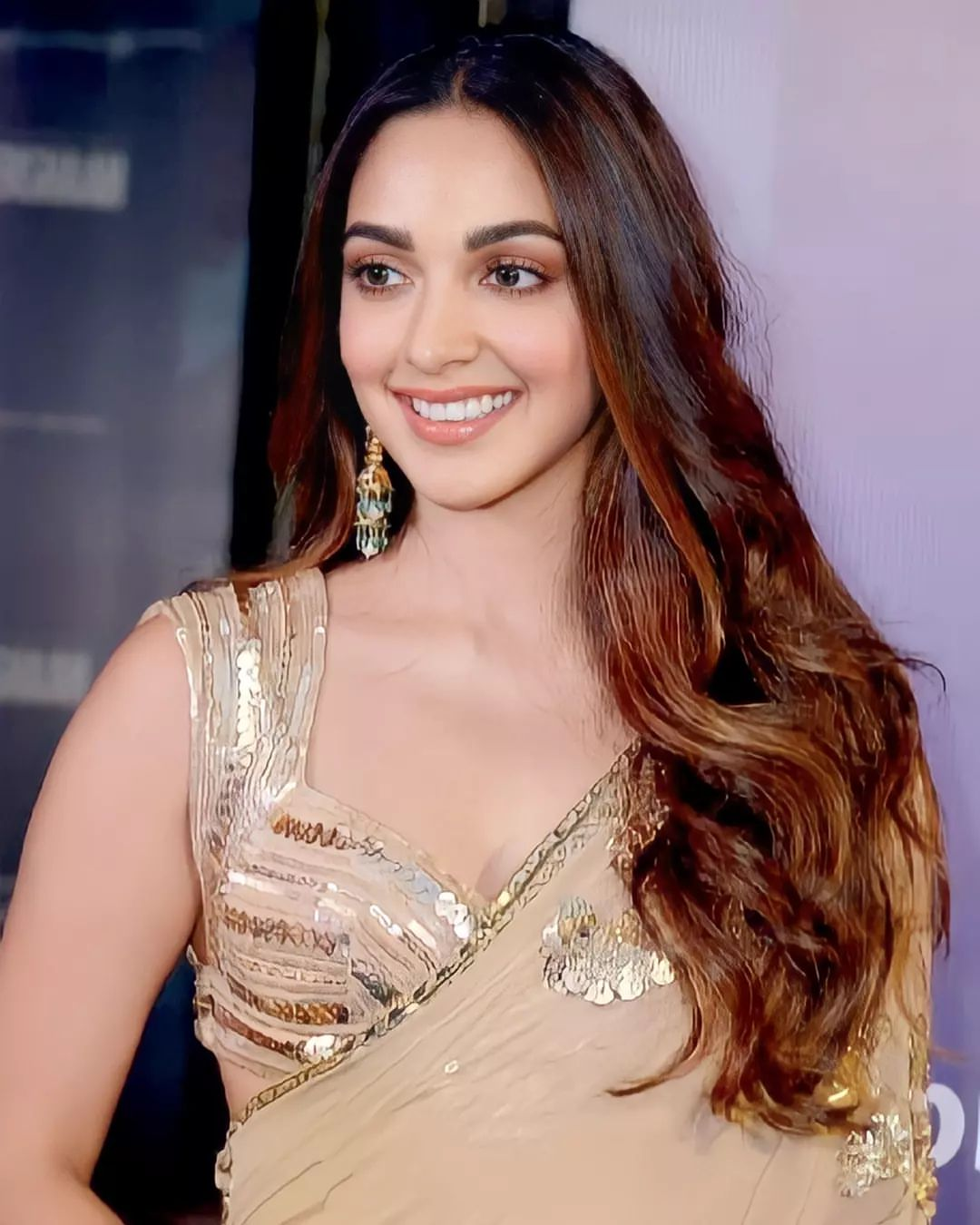
- Kiara Advani
  31 July – Kiara Advani, actress.
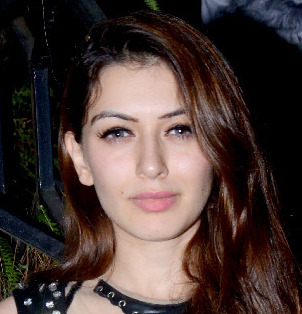
- Hansika Motwani
  9 August – Hansika Motwani, actress.
- 5 September – Honey Rose, actress.
- 27 September – Amzad Ali, cricketer.
- 16 October – Shardul Thakur, cricketer.
- 18 October – Jaydev Unadkat, cricketer.
- 26 October – Amala Paul, actress.
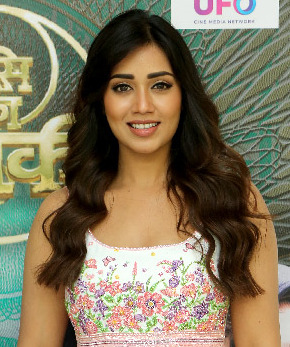
- Nivetha Pethuraj
  30 November – Nivetha Pethuraj, actress.
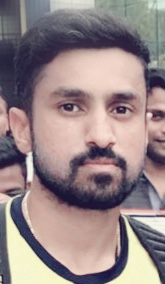
- Karun Nair
  6 December – Karun Nair, Indian cricketer.

== Deaths ==
- 21 February – Nutan, Bollywood actress
- 15 May – Kalindi Charan Panigrahi, poet, novelist, story writer, dramatist and essayist (born 1901)
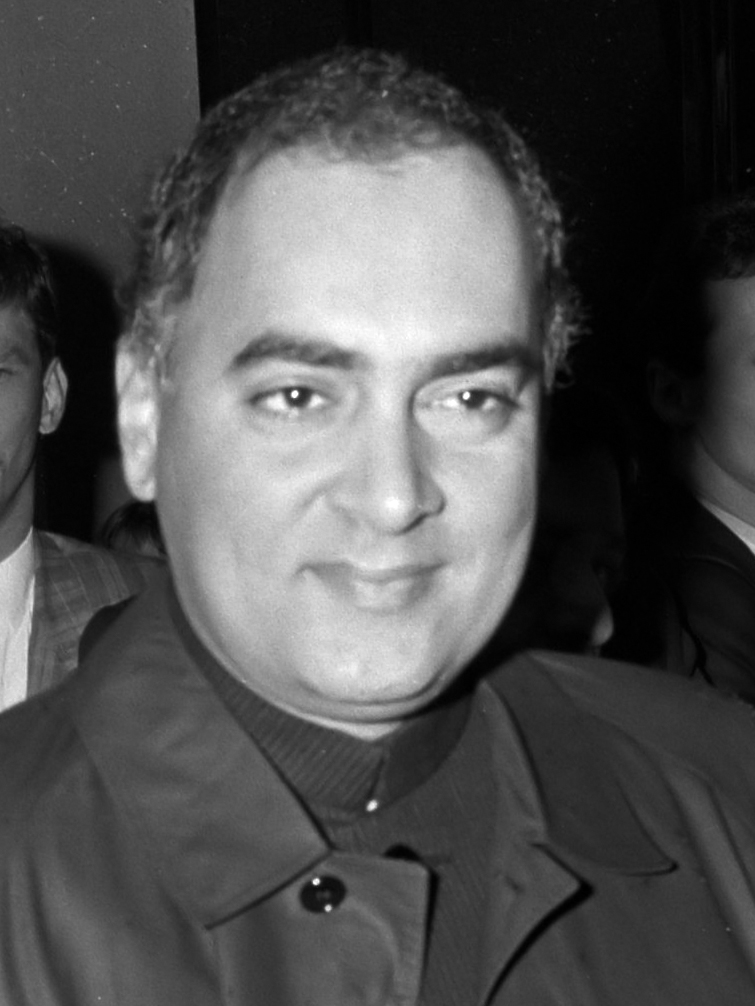
- Rajiv Gandhi
  21 May – Rajiv Gandhi, prime minister (1984–1989), Bharat Ratna (1991) (born 1944)
- 24 October – Ismat Chughtai, writer (born 1915)

== See also ==
- Bollywood films of 1991
