= 1920 in India =

- Centuries: 18th; 19th; 20th; 21st
- Decades: 1900s; 1910s; 1920s; 1930s; 1940s
- See also: List of years in India; Timeline of Indian history

Events in the year 1920 in India.

== Incumbents ==
- Emperor of India – George V
- Viceroy of India – Frederic Thesiger, 1st Viscount Chelmsford

== Events ==
- National income – ₹ 30,428 million
- 1 September – Non-cooperation movement was launched by Mahatma Gandhi.
- 8 September – The Jamiat Ulama-e-Hind issued a religious edict, Fatwa Tark-e-Mawālat on the boycott of British goods.
- 14 September – Muhammadan Anglo-Oriental College, founded by Sir Syed Ahmed Khan in Aligarh in 1875, becomes Aligarh Muslim University.
- October – Formation of All India Trade Union Congress.
- 25 November – Founding of the University of Lucknow.

== Law ==
- 8 July – The House of Commons adopts the findings of the Hunter report.
- Provincial Insolvency Act
- Passport (Entry into India) Act
- Identification of Prisoners Act
- Aligarh Muslim University Act
- Charitable and Religious Trusts Act
- Indian Red Cross Society Act

== Births ==
=== January to June ===
- 12 February – Pran, actor (died 2013).
- 16 February – I. S. Johar, actor, writer, producer and director (died 1984).
- 7 April – Ravi Shankar, sitar player and composer (died 2012).
- 14 June – Acharya Shri Mahapragya 10th Acharya of Jain Terapanth Sect (died 2010)

=== July to December ===
- 14 July – Shankarrao Chavan, politician and twice Chief Minister of Maharashtra (died 2004)
- 1 August – Annabhau Sathe, social reformer and writer (died 1969)
- 9 September – Santosh Kumar Ghosh, Bengali writer (died 1985)
- 19 October – Pandurang Shastri Athavale, philosopher, spiritual leader, social reformer, who founded the Swadhyay Movement (died 2003)
- 27 October – K. R. Narayanan, politician and 10th President of India (died 2005)
- 17 November – Gemini Ganesan, actor (died 2005)

=== Full date unknown ===
- Bharat Bhushan, actor (died 1992).

== Deaths ==
- 26 April – Srinivasa Ramanujan, mathematician (born 1887).
- 20 July - Sarada Devi, Hindu mystic (born 1853).
- 1 August – Bal Gangadhar Tilak, nationalist, social reformer and independence fighter (born 1856).
- 30 November – Mahmud Hasan Deobandi, freedom fighter, co-founder of the Jamia Millia Islamia and founder of the Silk Letter Movement (born 1851)
