= 1992 in India =

- Centuries: 18th; 19th; 20th; 21st
- Decades: 1970s; 1980s; 1990s; 2000s; 2010s
- See also: List of years in India; Timeline of Indian history

Events in the year 1992 in the Republic of India.

== Incumbents ==
- President of India – R. Venkataraman until 25 July, Shankar Dayal Sharma
- Prime Minister of India – P. V. Narasimha Rao
- Vice President of India – Shankar Dayal Sharma until 27 October, K. R. Narayanan
- Chief Justice of India – Madhukar Hiralal Kania until 17 November, Lalit Mohan Sharma

=== Governors ===
- Andhra Pradesh – Krishan Kant
- Arunachal Pradesh – Surendranath Dwivedy
- Assam – Loknath Mishra
- Bihar – Mohammad Shafi Qureshi
- Goa – Bhanu Prakash Singh
- Gujarat – Sarup Singh
- Haryana – Dhanik Lal Mandal
- Himachal Pradesh – Virendra Verma
- Jammu and Kashmir – Girish Chandra Saxena
- Karnataka – Bhanu Pratap Singh (until 6 January), Khurshed Alam Khan (starting 6 January)
- Kerala – B. Rachaiah
- Madhya Pradesh – M. A. Khan
- Maharashtra – C. Subramaniam
- Manipur – Chintamani Panigrahi
- Meghalaya – Madhukar Dighe
- Mizoram – Swaraj Kaushal
- Nagaland – M. M. Thomas (until 12 April), Loknath Mishra (starting 13 April)
- Odisha – Yagya Dutt Sharma
- Punjab – Surendra Nath
- Rajasthan – Sarup Singh (until 5 February), Marri Chenna Reddy (starting 5 February)
- Sikkim – Radhakrishna Hariram Tahiliani
- Tamil Nadu – Bhishma Narain Singh
- Tripura – K. V. Raghunatha Reddy
- Uttar Pradesh – B. Satya Narayan Reddy
- West Bengal – Saiyid Nurul Hasan

== Events ==
- National income - ₹7,611,959 million
- 1 February – Chief Judicial Magistrate of Bhopal Court declares Warren Anderson, ex-CEO of Union Carbide, a fugitive under Indian law for failing to appear in the Bhopal disaster case, and orders the Indian government to press for an extradition from the United States.
- 1 April - Project Unigauge started under leadership of C. K. Jaffer Sharief.
- 23 April – Scam of Harshad Mehta was exposed by journalist Sucheta Dalal, which consisted of SBI 500 Crore Scam and illegal usage of loophole in banking system.
- May – Over 200 people die in Cuttack in Odisha, after drinking illegally brewed liquor. About 600 people were hospitalised (see: 1992 Odisha liquor deaths).
- 19 May - V.S. Chandralekha an Indian Administrative Service officer faces Acid attack at Chennai.
- 20 June - Vachathi case
- 14 August – Veerappan Gang Trapped and killed Mysore District SP, T.Harikrishna, SI Shakeel Ahmed and four constables named Benegonda, C.M.Kalappa, Sundara and M.P.Appachu, through a false informant near Meenyam in Karnataka
- 20 August – Konkani language, Nepali language and Meitei language (officially known as Manipuri language) included in the constitutional scheduled languages' list and made one of the official languages of the Indian Republic through 71st amendment of Constitution of India.
- 2 October – Zee Television, a Hindi language satellite and cable television station, a first officially regular broadcasting service to start in Mumbai.
- 13 November - Floods in Tirunelveli district following Cloudburst causing more than 30 cms of rain in upper reaches of Thamirabarani River within 8 hours.
- 6 December – Members of the Vishva Hindu Parishad (VHP, World Hindu Council) tear down a 16th-century mosque located in Ayodhya, in Northern India. The mosque is built over a shrine which exhorted the small piece of land as Ram Janmabhoomi – the birthplace of Lord Rama. This sparks off nationwide communal riots in which some 3,000 people die.
- Indian Rupee exchange rate collapsed. It was 20 Rs to 1 dollar in January 1992 and it became 30 Rs to 1 dollar in December 1992. A huge 50% depreciation in value.

== Law ==
- Government of India establishes SEBI, stock exchange regulator.

== Births ==
- 3 January – Nikki Galrani, actress.
- 5 January – Sanjay Balmuchu, footballer.
- 28 January – Munawar Faruqui, stand-up comedian
- 27 February – Abigail Jain, actress.
- 1 March – Alwyn George, footballer.
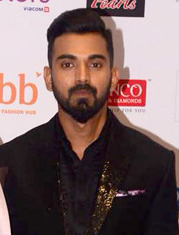
- KL Rahul
  18 April – K. L. Rahul, cricketer.
- 9 May – Sai Pallavi, actress.
- 31 May – Sobhita Dhulipala, actress, model and Miss Earth India.
- 4 July – Yuki Bhambri, tennis player.
- 30 July – Vishal Kumar, football player.
- 13 June – Disha Patani, actress.
- 1 August – Mrunal Thakur, actress.
- 15 September – Shilton D'Silva, soccer player.

17 October –

- Keerthy Suresh, actress.
- Pranitha Subhash, actress.
- 5 October Arjun Das, actor.
- 21 October – Srinidhi Shetty, actress and model.
- 23 November - Navdeep Saini, cricketer
- 24 December – Soram Anganba, footballer.
- 31 December – Manu Attri, badminton player.
- 7 August – Deepak Chahar, cricketer.
- 15 August – Baskaran Adhiban, chess Grandmaster.

== Deaths ==
- 27 January – Bharat Bhushan, actor (born 1920).
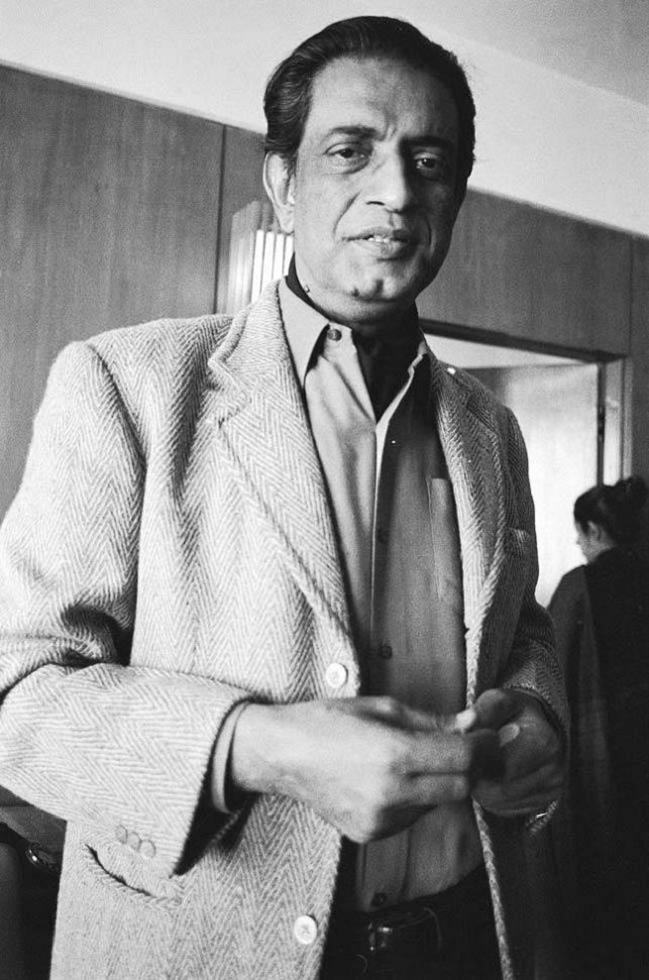
- Satyajit Ray
  23 April – Satyajit Ray, filmmaker (born 1921).
- 17 July – Kanan Devi, actress and singer (born 1916).
- 27 July – Amjad Khan, actor and director (born 1940).
- 3 November – Prem Nath, actor (born 1926).

=== Full date unknown ===
- V. K. Gokak, writer and scholar (born 1909).

== See also ==
- Bollywood films of 1992
