= V. K. Nayar =

Indian Governor

Governor of Manipur
- In office 30 August 1993 – 22 December 1994
- Chief Minister: R. K. Dorendra Singh
- Preceded by: K. V. Raghunatha Reddy
- Succeeded by: Oudh Narayan Shrivastava

Governor of Nagaland
- In office 2 October 1993 – 4 August 1994
- Chief Minister: S. C. Jamir
- Preceded by: Lokanath Misra
- Succeeded by: Oudh Narayan Shrivastava

Personal details
- Died: 30 November 2015
- Occupation: Indian Army Officer; Administrator
- As of 01 March, 2020

Lt. Gen. V. K. Nayar PVSM, SM (died 30 November 2015) was a former Indian Army officer, who served after retirement as the Governor of Manipur and Nagaland.

While in the Army, he served as a Paratrooper, an infantryman, a Counter-insurgency specialist and Army commander (GOC-in-C, Western Command).

== Personal life ==
He was married to Sajni Nayar, had one son (also an Army Officer) and one daughter. He died on 30 November 2015.

== Bibliography ==
- From Fatigues to Civvies: Memoirs of a Paratrooper (2013)
