= P. K. Venugopalan Nambiar =

Indian scientist

P.K Venugopalan Nambiar
- Born: Taliparamba, Kerala, India
- Children: Devika, Vinod Kumar, Vijayakumar, Vasanthi, Venugopal, Valsala
- Awards: Sugandha Bharathi Award - 2002 from Indian Society of Spices

P. K. Venugopalan Nambiar (1924–1996) was an Indian agricultural scientist credited with the development of the first hybrid variety of black pepper in the world, Panniyur-1. As the Head of Pepper Research Station, Panniyur in Kerala, he developed and released Panniyur-1 for commercial cultivation in 1971.

Venugopalan Nambiar devoted his life for improvement of black pepper to increase the productivity of the crop. He also assembled a large germ plasm collection of black pepper and developed infrastructure of Pepper Research Station in Panniyur. Besides being a scientist, Venugopalan Nambiar was cherished and adored as a leader of the farming community especially in Kerala

== Panniyur-1 ==
Although several varieties of Black pepper have been developed and released for commercial cultivation, Panniyur-1 has withstood the test of time and is still the ruling variety in all the states in India where black pepper is grown and also in other black pepper growing countries. This variety is known to every black pepper grower and is popular in small homestead gardens and in large plantations. The variety has special distinguishing characters such as long spike, high fruit setting bold berries and high yield.

== Awards ==
The Indian Society of Spices, Kozhikode honored Venugopalan Nambiar with Sugandha Bharathi Award - 2002 in recognition of his lifetime contribution to the cause of black pepper and spices research and development. Mr. Nambiar has got many awards like "good service entry" from Kerala Government. He also presented many articles in various conferences and also published many articles in journals.
