= Om Prakash Sharma (Nagaland politician) =

Indian politician

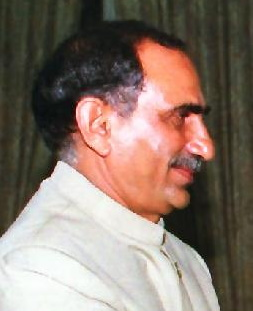

Governor of Nagaland
- In office 12 November 1996 – 27 January 2002
- Preceded by: Oudh Narayan Shrivastava
- Succeeded by: Shyamal Datta

Personal details
- Occupation: Civil Servant; Administrator
- As of 01 March, 2020

Om Prakash Sharma is a former Governor of Nagaland.

Prior to being Governor of Nagaland, he served with the Indian Police Service and was Director general of police in Punjab, India.
