= 1921 in India =

- Centuries: 18th; 19th; 20th; 21st
- Decades: 1900s; 1910s; 1920s; 1930s; 1940s
- See also: List of years in India; Timeline of Indian history

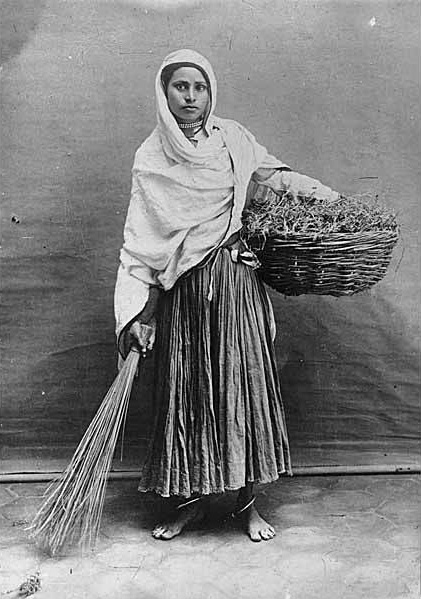
Young woman in India, 1921

Events in the year 1921 in India.

== Incumbents ==
- Emperor of India – George V
- Viceroy of India – Frederic Thesiger, 1st Viscount Chelmsford
- Viceroy of India – The Earl of Reading (from 2 April)

== Events ==
- National income – ₹ 25,337 million
- June – the Madras province declared in a judgement that women also have the right to vote
- August - Malabar rebellion commenced.
- November - The Prince of Wales, later King Edward VIII, arrives in India. Upon his arrival in Bombay there is widespread agitation. He was greeted with empty streets (The agitation was non violent).
- 19 November - Prince of Wales riots
- 23 December – Visva-Bharati University is inaugurated.

== Law ==
- 8 April – Permanent Advisory Council of Princes inaugurated; Council of State and Legislative Assembly inaugurated.
- Maintenance Orders Enforcement Act

== Births And Deaths ==
=== January to June ===
- 9 January – Lister Sinclair, Indian-Canadian broadcaster and playwright (died 2006)
- 21 January – Jaswant Singh Marwah, journalist and author
- 24 February – Paulaseer (Paulaseer Lawrie Muthukrishna), Indian preacher (died 1989)
- 8 March – Sahir Ludhianvi, Urdu poet and Hindi lyricist and songwriter (died 1980)
- 14 April – Subodh Mukherjee, filmmaker (died 2005)
- 2 May – Satyajit Ray, filmmaker (died 1992)
- 21 May – Prabhat Ranjan Sarkar, philosopher, author, social revolutionary, poet, composer and linguist (died 1990)
- 2 May – B. B. Lal, archaeologist, Director-General Archaeological Survey of India (1968–1972) (died 2022)
- 28 June – P. V. Narasimha Rao, politician, 12th Prime Minister of India (died 2004)

=== July to December ===
- 1 August – Devarakonda Balagangadhara Tilak, poet, novelist and short story writer (died 1966)
- 24 September – Dhulipala Seetharama Sastry, actor (died 2007)
- 7 December – Pramukh Swami Maharaj, leader of BAPS Swaminarayan Sanstha

- 11 September – Subramanya Bharathi, poet, independence fighter and reformer (born 1882)
- Ahmed Rida Khan, Sunni Muslim scholar and founder of Barelwi school of thought (born 1856)
