= 1922 in India =

- Centuries: 18th; 19th; 20th; 21st
- Decades: 1900s; 1910s; 1920s; 1930s; 1940s
- See also: List of years in India; Timeline of Indian history

Events in the year 1922 in India.

== Incumbents ==
- Emperor of India – George V
- Viceroy of India – The Earl of Reading

== Events ==
- National income - ₹25,278 million
- The Light of the East, a monthly review is founded at Calcutta.
- February – The Chauri Chaura incident occurs, over time work where a mob of about 3000 kills some policemen. With the Non-cooperation movement (NCM) taking an increasingly violent form, this is the last straw to Gandhi's sense of discipline. He immediately calls for suspension of the NCM, leaving many Congress activists disappointed.
- 11 March – Mohandas Gandhi is arrested in Bombay for sedition.
- 13 March – Prince of Wales Edward VIII inaugurates the Prince of Wales Royal Indian Military College in Dehradun, India marking a capitulation of the British Empire to growing pressure for Indianization of the Officer Cadre of the British Indian Army.
- 18 March – Mohandas Gandhi is sentenced to six years in prison for sedition. He would serve only two years.
- Mohenjadaro was discovered
- December, 1922 - Gaya Session of Indian National Congress

== Births ==
- 9 January – Har Gobind Khorana, molecular biologist, shared Nobel Prize in 1968 (died 2011).
- 27 January – Ajit Khan, actor (died 1998).
- 4 February – Bhimsen Joshi, Hindustani classical Singer (died 2011).
- 22 February - S. H. Raza, modern Indian painter. (died 2016)
- 4 March – Dina Pathak, actress and activist (died 2002).
- 2 July – Mohammed Fazal, former Governor of Maharashtra. (died 2014)
- 29 July – Balwant Moreshwar Purandare, writer (d. 2021)
- 30 September – Hrishikesh Mukherjee, film director (died 2006).
- 1 October – Allu Rama Lingaiah, actor (died 2004).
- 20 October – Syed Masood Hassan Shihab Dehlvi, Writer and Poet (d. 1990 in Pakistan)
- 11 December – Dilip Kumar, actor and politician (died 2021).

=== Full date unknown ===
- Chandrashekhar, actor.
- O. Madhavan, director and actor (died 2005).

== Deaths ==
- 21 March – C. V. Raman Pillai, novelist and playwright (born 1858)
- 25 June – Satyendranath Dutta, Bengali poet (born 1882)
