= D. Karthika Anagha =

Indian musician

Devarakonda Karthika Anagha (born June 29, 1991), is a South Indian Carnatic classical vocalist and a recipient of the Bal Shree Award (2007) - a national award given by the President of India for children excelling in creative fields.
