= Chaudhary Randhir Singh =

Indian freedom fighter and politician

Chaudhary Randhir Singh (born 1 July 1924 in [Bayanpur] - 15 April 2023) was an Indian freedom fighter, a formidable politician and an author. He was member of the Indian National Congress. Chaudhary Randhir was a member of the 4th Lok Sabha from the Rohtak constituency in Haryana.

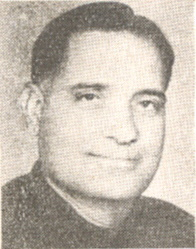

He was an accomplished lawyer and participated in popular agitations as well as mass movements and courted arrest seven times several times on important public issues. During the 1980s, he was a member of Agricultural Prices Commission and did his best in the interest of farmers in fixing minimum support price for wheat and other cereals.

He was Secretary, Punjab P.S.P.; was member, Central Committee, All India P.S.P.; was Secretary, All India Kisan Panchayat; was Delegate Socialist International; was Secretary-General, United Front of Opposition Parties, Punjab; Fellow, Punjab University, 1961—65; Member-(1) Punjab University Finance Board, 1961—63; (2) Regional Transport Authority, Ambala, 1959—61, (3) Punjab Political Sufferers Rehabilitation Board 1965-66. (4) District Flood Relief Committee, 1965-66; (5) District Citizens Committee, 1964-66, (6) Sub-Divisional Advisory Committee, 1964—66; Secretary, Haryana Education Society; Secretary-cum-Manager, C.R.A. College, Sonepat; Secretary-cum-Manager, C.R.Z. High School, Sonepat; Joint Secretary, Kamla Nehru Panchayat Shiksha Kendra Rai Member, Executive Committee, Janta Higher Secondary School, Batasa; Convener, Indo-Soviet Cultural Society, Haryana State; Convener, Sarvkhap Panchayats for Eradication of Social Evils and Stoppage of Early Marriage in Haryana State.

He was the Governor of Sikkim from February 1996 to May 2001.

He was the author of multiple books which have been featured in libraries all across the world. A few titles authored by him included Baychara Kissan (Hapless Farmer), Nectar of Life, our rural poor and an autobiography detailing his life and political trajectory 'Threshing Floor to Raj Bhawan'.
