= Oudh Narayan Shrivastava =

Indian officer (born 1935)

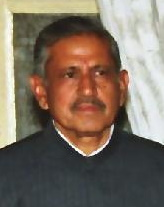

Governor of Nagaland
- In office 5 August 1994 – 11 November 1996
- Chief Minister: S. C. Jamir
- Preceded by: V. K. Nayar
- Succeeded by: Om Prakash Sharma

Governor of Manipur
- In office 23 December 1994 – 11 February 1999
- Preceded by: V. K. Nayar
- Succeeded by: Ved Marwah

Personal details
- Born: April 1935 (age 91) Bhopal, Central Provinces, British India
- Occupation: Civil Servant; Administrator
- As of 01 March, 2020

Oudh Narayan Shrivastava (born April 1935) is an Indian former officer of the Indian Police Service who served as the Governor of Nagaland and later the Governor of Manipur. He was awarded the Padma Shri in 1992.

== Career ==
Oudh Narayan Shrivastava served with the Indian Police Service for 35 years, including 20 years with the Intelligence Bureau. He spent the last eighteen years in the Northeastern states, after which he was appointed Governor of Manipur and Nagaland, from where he eventually retired.

Shrivastava was directly responsible for the peace accords with the Mizo National Front, Tripura National Volunteers and the All Bodo Students’ Union.

Shrivastava has been decorated many times by the IPS and IB and was awarded the Padma Shri in 1992, for outstanding work in the Northeast.

After retirement he took to writing. He has published five anthologies of short and long stories, of which four are in Hindi and one in English, and continues to write.

== Bibliography ==
- Life And Times Of Dacoit Queen Putli Bai (and Some Short Stories), 1990
- Slave Boy and other stories & Shubho Srishti and other stories, 2017
