= List of Chief Secretaries of Tamil Nadu =

Secretary to the Tamil Nadu Council of Ministers

Chief Secretary of Government of Tamil Nadu

- Incumbent; M. Sai Kumar since 8 April 2026
- Abbreviation: CS
- Reports to: Governor and Chief Minister
- Appointer: Chief Minister of Tamil Nadu
- Inaugural holder: C. W. E. Cotton (1929–1931) as Chief Secretary of Madras Presidency; C. A. Ramakrishnan (1969) as Chief Secretary of Tamil Nadu

The chief secretary of Tamil Nadu is the highest ranking officer in the Government of Tamil Nadu, who serves as the head of the state administration, and the secretariat. The chief secretary is a senior Indian Administrative Service officer, and is appointed by the Governor of Tamil Nadu on the recommendation of the chief minister. The secretary also acts as the ex-officio secretary to the council of ministers. The functions include administration and managing of the secretariat, providing secretarial assistance to the cabinet, coordination and implementation of policies and decisions of the government, providing requisite data and information to the cabinet, and organising cabinet meetings amongst others. The chief secretary ranks 23rd on the Indian order of precedence.

== Chief Secretaries ==
List of chief secretaries
No.	Name (Birth–Death)	Term of office			Chief Minister (Note: First minister or Premier or chief minister while in office)
No.	Name (Birth–Death)	Assumed office	Left office	Time in office	Chief Minister
Chief Secretary of Madras Presidency
1	C. W. E. Cotton	1929	1931	2 years	P. Subbarayan; B. Munuswamy Naidu
2	Geoffrey Bracken	1931	1935	4 years	B. Munuswamy Naidu; Ramakrishna Ranga Rao
3	C. F. Brackenbury	1935	1938	3 years	Ramakrishna Ranga Rao; P. T. Rajan; Kurma Venkata Reddy Naidu
4	G. T. Boag	1938	1939	1 year	C. Rajagopalachari
5	S. V. Ramamurthy	1939	1943	4 years	C. Rajagopalachari; Governor-general's rule
6	Christopher Masterman	1943	1947	4 years	Governor-general's rule T. Prakasam
Chief Secretary of Madras State (post independence)
1	K. Ramunni Menon	15 August 1947	1955	8 years	Omanthur P. Ramaswamy Reddiar; P. S. Kumaraswamy Raja; Rajaji; K. Kamaraj
2	C. K. Vijayaraghavan	1954	1955		K. Kamaraj
3	W. R. S. Sathianathan (1900-	1955	1959	5 years	K. Kamaraj
4	M. V. Subramanian (1900-				K. Kamaraj
5	T. N. S. Raghavan (1901-	1959	1960		K. Kamaraj
6	R. A. Gopalaswami (1902-	1960	1962		K. Kamaraj
7	S. K. Chettur (1905-1972)	1962	1964		K. Kamaraj; M. Bhakthavatsalam
8	T. A. Varghese (1907-	1964	10 November 1965		M. Bhakthavatsalam
9	C. A. Ramakrishnan (1910-	10 November 1965	13 January 1969	3 years, 64 days	M. Bhakthavatsalam; C.N.Annadurai
Chief Secretary of Tamil Nadu
1	C. A. Ramakrishnan (1910-	14 January 1969	13 November 1969	303 days	C.N.Annadurai; V. R. Nedunchezhiyan; M. Karunanidhi
2	E. P. Royappa (1918–1993)	14 November 1969	12 April 1971	1 year, 149 days	M. Karunanidhi
3	P. Sabanayagam (1922–2023)	12 April 1971	11 March 1976	4 years, 334 days	M. Karunanidhi; President's rule
4	V. Karthikeyan (1924–2014)	12 March 1976	15 February 1977	340 days	President's rule
5	C. V. R. Panikar (1926–2020)	16 February 1977	29 June 1977	133 days	President's rule
(4)	V. Karthikeyan (1924–2014)	30 June 1977	21 August 1981	4 years, 52 days	M. G. Ramachandran; President's rule
6	K. Diraviam (1925-1983)	22 August 1981	24 January 1983	1 year, 155 days	M. G. Ramachandran
7	K. Chockalingam (1926-)	11 February 1983	31 March 1985	2 years, 48 days	M. G. Ramachandran
8	T. V. Antony (1933–2020)	1 April 1985	20 July 1986	1 year, 110 days	M. G. Ramachandran
9	A. Padmanabhan (1928–)	21 July 1986	5 February 1988	1 year, 199 days	M. G. Ramachandran; V. R. Nedunchezhiyan; V. N. Janaki Ramachandran; President's rule
10	M. M. Rajendran (1935–2023)	6 February 1988	18 January 1991	2 years, 346 days	President's rule M. Karunanidhi
(8)	T. V. Antony (1933–2020)	19 January 1991	25 June 1991	157 days	M. Karunanidhi; President's rule
11	T. V. Venkataraman (1935–2018)	26 June 1991	31 May 1994	2 years, 339 days	J. Jayalalithaa
12	N. Haribhaskar (1936-	31 May 1994	27 May 1996	1 year, 362 days	J. Jayalalithaa; M. Karunanidhi
13	K. A. Nambiar (1938-	6 June 1996	30 June 1998	2 years, 24 days	M. Karunanidhi
14	A. P. Muthuswami (1941-	30 June 1998	31 May 2001	2 years, 335 days	M. Karunanidhi; J. Jayalalithaa
15	P. Shankar (1943–2024)	1 June 2001	6 June 2002	1 year, 5 days	J. Jayalalithaa; O. Panneerselvam
16	Sukavaneshvar (1944-	10 June 2002	2 December 2002	175 days	J. Jayalalithaa
17	Lakshmi Pranesh (1945–)	2 December 2002	30 April 2005	2 years, 149 days	J. Jayalalithaa
18	N. Narayanan (1948-)	1 May 2005	12 May 2006	1 year, 11 days	J. Jayalalithaa
19	L. K. Tripathy (1948–2013)	13 May 2006	31 August 2008	2 years, 110 days	M. Karunanidhi
20	K. S. Sripathi (1951–)	1 September 2008	31 August 2010	1 year, 364 days	M. Karunanidhi
21	S. Malathi (1954–2012)	1 September 2010	15 May 2011	256 days	M. Karunanidhi
22	Debendranath Sarangi (1953–)	16 May 2011	31 December 2012	1 year, 229 days	J. Jayalalithaa
23	Sheela Balakrishnan (1954–)	31 December 2012	31 March 2014	1 year, 100 days	J. Jayalalithaa
24	Mohan Verghese Chunkath (1956–)	31 March 2014	2 December 2014	246 days	J. Jayalalithaa; O. Panneerselvam
25	K. Gnanadesikan (1959–)	2 December 2014	6 June 2016	1 year, 187 days	J. Jayalalithaa; O. Panneerselvam
26	P. Rama Mohana Rao (1957–)	6 June 2016	22 December 2016	199 days	J. Jayalalithaa; O. Panneerselvam
27	Girija Vaidyanathan (1959–)	22 December 2016	30 June 2019	2 years, 190 days	O. Panneerselvam; Edappadi K. Palaniswami
28	K. Shanmugam (1960–)	30 June 2019	31 January 2021	1 year, 215 days	Edappadi K. Palaniswami
29	Rajeev Ranjan (1961–)	1 February 2021	6 May 2021	94 days	Edappadi K. Palaniswami
30	V. Irai Anbu (1963–)	7 May 2021	30 June 2023	2 years, 54 days	M. K. Stalin
31	Shiv Das Meena (1964–)	1 July 2023	19 August 2024	1 year, 49 days	M. K. Stalin
32	N. Muruganandam (1969–)	19 August 2024	8 April 2026	1 year, 232 days	M. K. Stalin
33	M. Sai Kumar (1966–)	8 April 2026	Incumbent	194 days	M. K. Stalin; C. Joseph Vijay

== See also ==
- Advocate General
- Director General of Police
- List of chief secretaries of Assam
- List of chief secretaries of Maharashtra
- List of chief secretaries of Mizoram
- List of chief secretaries of Uttarakhand
