= IISCO Steel Plant =

Steel plant of SAIL in West Bengal, India

- Industry: Iron & Steel
- Founded: 1918 (IISCO); 2007 (new steel plant)
- Headquarters: Burnpur, Asansol, West Bengal
- Key people: Surajit Mishra (Director Incharge)
- Products: Wire & Coil, TMT Rods, Z section, I section, Angles, Channels, Pig Iron etc.
- Revenue: $8.1 billion (2023)
- Number of employees: 5945 (as of April 2020)
- Website: sail.co.in

IISCO Steel Plant of Steel Authority of India Limited is an integrated steel plant located at Burnpur, a neighbourhood in Asansol city, in the Asansol subdivision of Paschim Bardhaman district, West Bengal, India.

== Overview ==
IISCO Steel Plant of Steel Authority of India at Burnpur has a crude steel production capacity of 2.5 million tonnes per year.

Established in 1918, the Indian Iron & Steel Company, once the flagship of the Martin Burn group, was amalgamated with SAIL in 2006 and renamed IISCO Steel Plant.

== IISCO Steel Plant Expansion ==
The Steel Authority of India has taken up the expansion of IISCO Steel plant at Burnpur to add 4 million tonnes per year of steelmaking capacity to its present capacity of 2.5 million tonnes of crude steel. The Steel Authority of India Limited has awarded Danieli contracts to supply major technologies for the expansion.SAIL has awarded the blast furnace package, the core of the 4.08 million tonnes expansion to Danieli Corus, the Netherlands based steel plant design and construction expert, with target completion of 41 months.

The project includes the following: (1) A 5,557 cubic metre blast furnace. (2) Three continuous casting slab casters, which will produce slabs up to 250 mm thick and 2,100 mm wide. (3) A state-of-the-art hot strip mill focused on coil production for the automotive and durable goods sectors.

Bharat Heavy Electricals Limited has secured a major power plant project worth ₹1,200-1,500 crore from Steel Authority of India Ltd (SAIL).

SEPC Ltd has received a Letter of Acceptance (LoA) from Steel Authority of India Ltd (SAIL) for two packages: the Coke Oven Balance of Plant (excluding civil and structural works) valued at ₹296.77 crore, and the Sinter Plant Balance of Plant (including civil and structural works) valued at ₹376.55 crore. The Coke Oven package is to be executed within 30 months from the effective date of the contract, while the Sinter Plant package has a 33-month execution timeline.

== Modernisation and Green field steel plant construction ==
The modernisation and expansion programme of IISCO steel plant was completed at a cost of over 16,000 crores. As of 2015, it was the single largest investment in West Bengal till then.

Manmohan Singh, Prime Minister, laid the foundation for the green field modernisation and expansion of IISCO Steel Plant at Burnpur on 24 December 2006. Others present on the occasion included Buddhadeb Bhattacharjee, chief minister of West Bengal, Ram Vilas Paswan, union minister for chemicals & fertilisers and steel, and Priya Ranjan Dasmunsi, union minister for information & broadcasting.

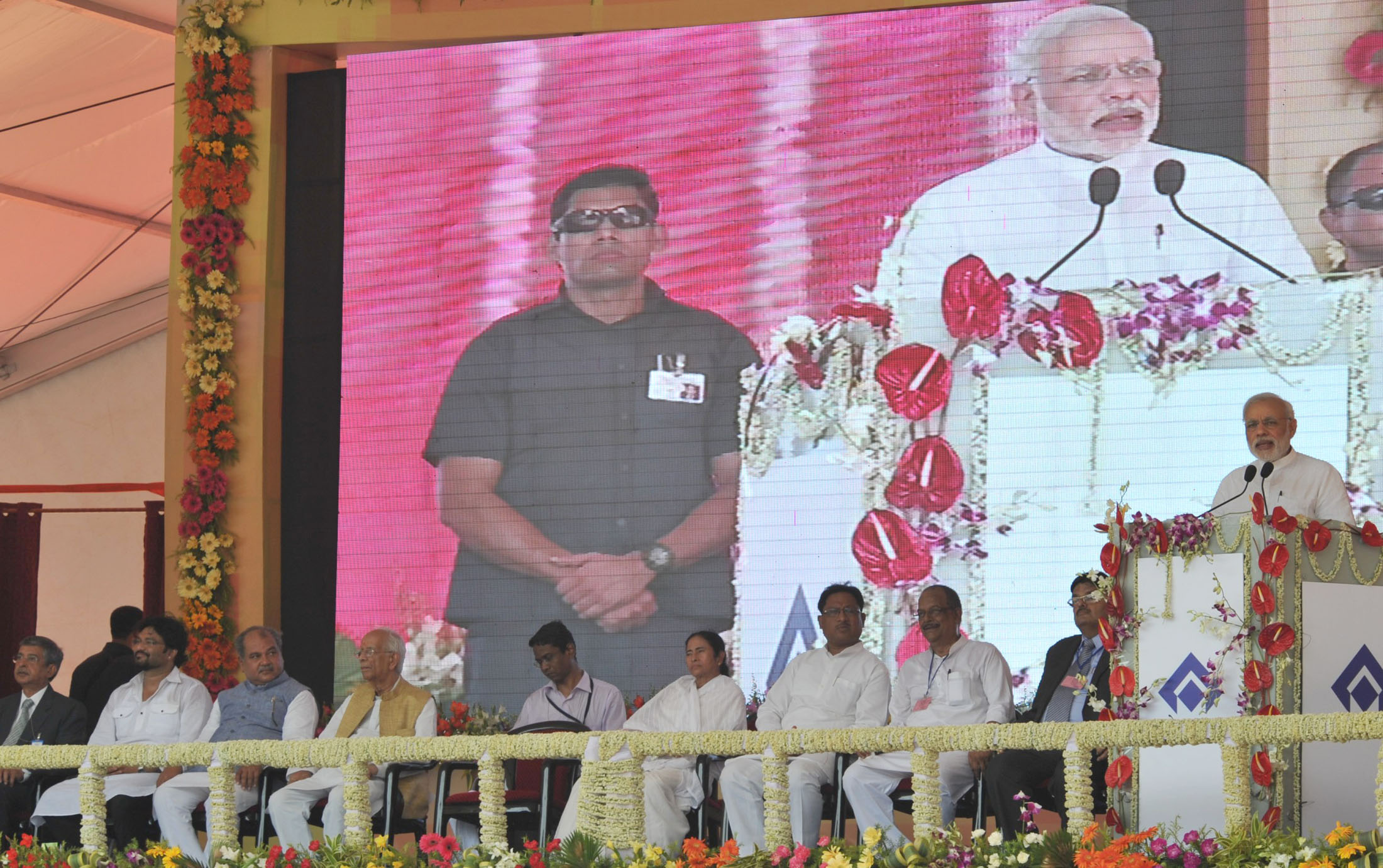
The Prime Minister, Shri Narendra Modi addressing at the dedication ceremony of the 2.5 mt. Modernized and Expanded IISCO Steel Plant to the nation, at Burnpur, in West Bengal on May 10, 2015. The Governor of West Bengal, Shri Keshari Nath Tripathi, the Chief Minister of West Bengal, Kumari Mamata Banerjee, the Union Minister for Mines and Steel, Shri Narendra Singh Tomar, the Minister of State for Mines and Steel, Shri Vishnu Deo Sai, the Minister of State for Urban Development, Housing and Urban Poverty Alleviation, Shri Babul Supriyo and other dignitaries are also seen. Author:Prime Minister's Office. This file or its source was published by Press Information Bureau on behalf of Prime Minister's Office, Government of India under the ID 65232 and CNR 67910.

After expansion and modernisation, it was inaugurated by Narendra Modi, Prime Minister, at Burnpur on 10 May 2015. Others present on the occasion included Mamata Banerjee, chief minister of West Bengal, Narendra Singh Tomar, union minister of state for steel and mines, Vishnudeo Sai, union minister of state for urban development and Babul Supriyo member of parliament from Asansol.

== Facilities ==
IISCO Steel plant has facilities at Burnpur. The main units are described below:

Coke Ovens: Coke Oven Battery No. 10 has 78 ovens with a height of 4.5 m and COB No. 11 has 74 ovens with a height of 7 m. It has a dry cooling plant using inert gases.

Rawmaterial Handling System designed to handle 7.56 million tonnes of raw materials annually,

Sinter Plant: Two sinter machines each with grate area of 204 m^{2}

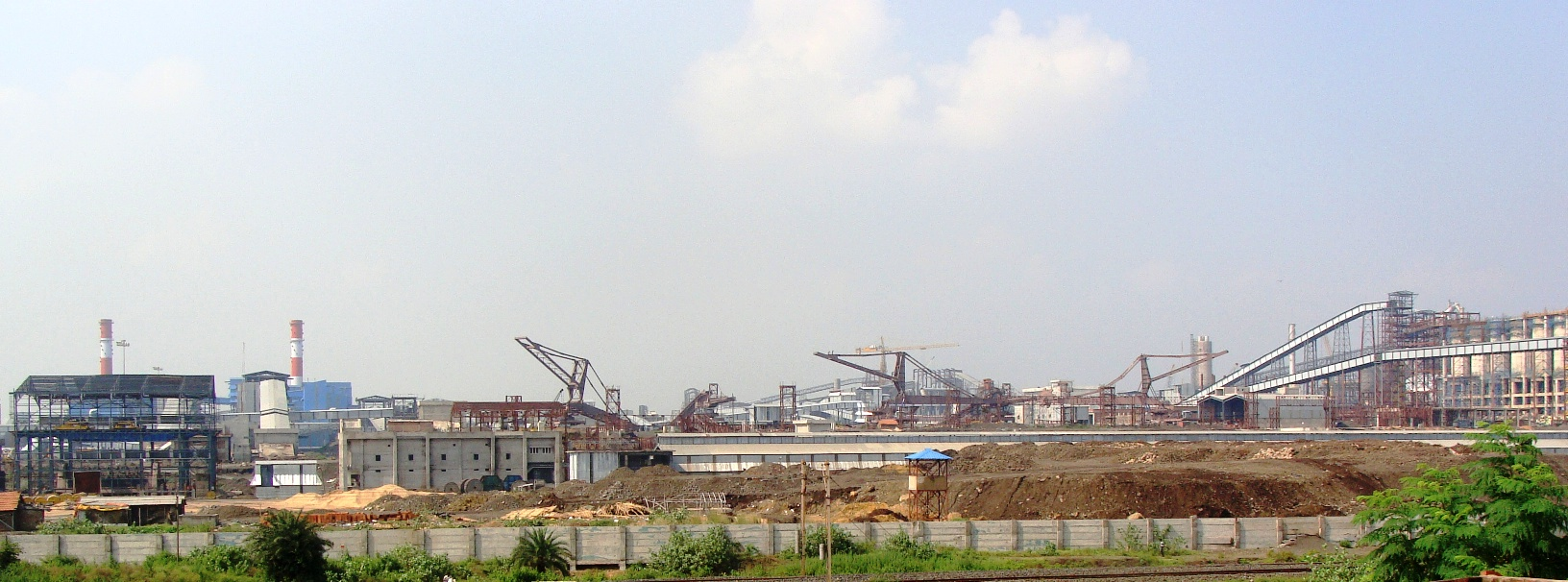
Greenfield steel plant construction in progress

Blast Furnace: The 4,160 m^{3} Blast Furnace Kalyani is one of the largest in the country. It uses high blast temperature, oxygen enrichment, high top pressure and pulverised coal injection technology. It was the largest operating blast furnce in the country at the time of its being blown in on 30 November 2014. Prior to this the largest blast furnce was at Rourkela Steel Plant of SAIL with a useful volume of 4,060 m^{3}.

Basic Oxygen Furnace: Three 150-tonne capacity BOFs to produce about 2.55 million tonnes of liquid steel annually. It is equipped with features like combined blowing and computerised operations.

Oxygen Plant – 2 x 750 tonnes per day.

Continuous Casters: Two 6-strand Billet Casters and one 4-strand Bloom-cum-Beam Blank Caster.

Rolling Mills : One Bar Mill and one Wire Rod Mill to produce 0.75 million tonnes of high quality bars and 0.5 million tonnes of wire rods per year. One Universal Section Mill to produce 0.6 million tonnes of universal section products per year.

=== Production ===
Crude steel production at ISP in 2017-18 was 1.80 million tonnes and saleable steel production was 1.69 million tonnes.

Crude steel production at ISP in 2016-17 was 1.4 million tonnes and saleable steel production was 1.3 million tonnes.

== History ==
=== Predecessors ===
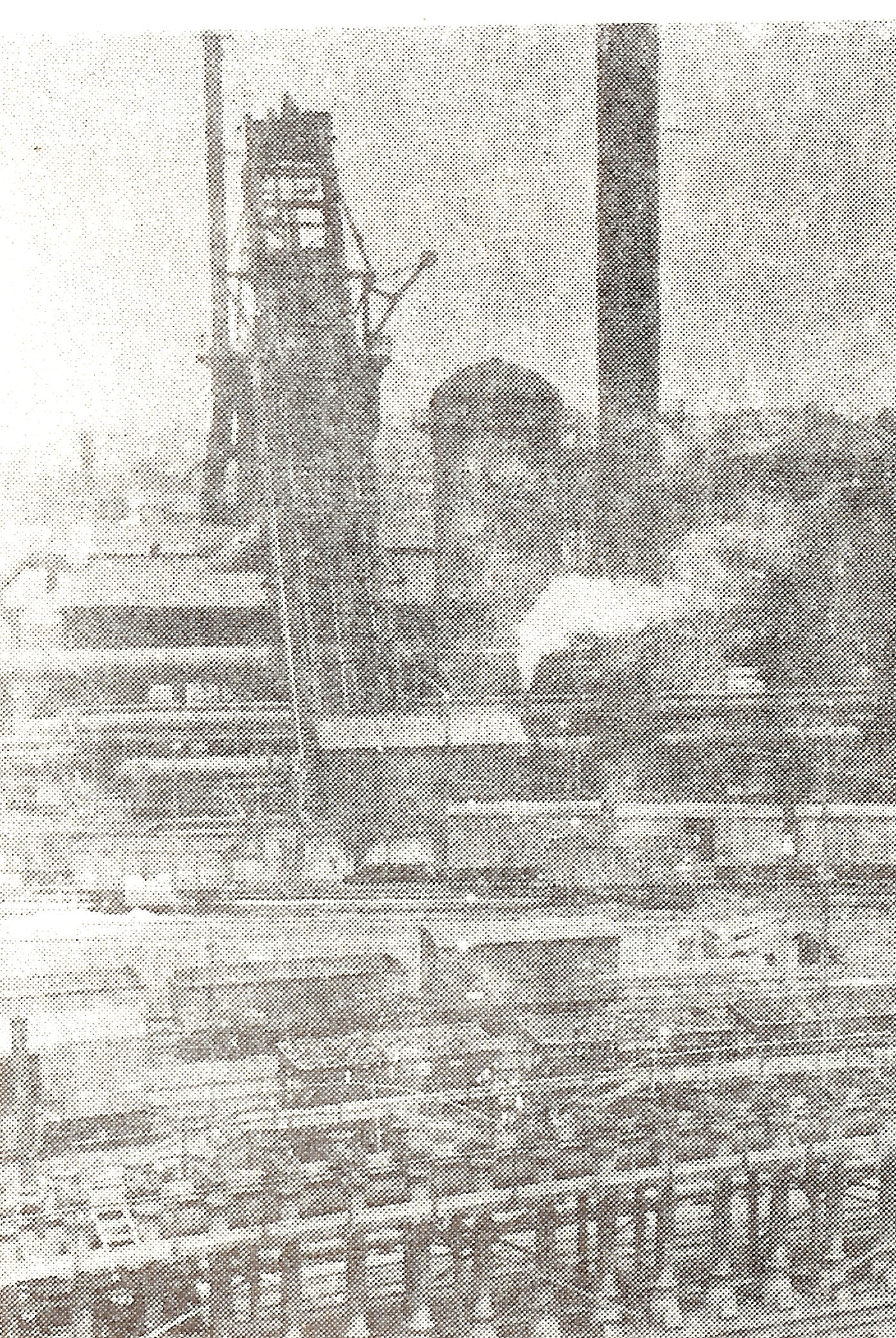
India's first blast furnace with coke oven battery in the foreground at Kulti

Several attempts were made in India in the 18th and 19th centuries to produce iron and steel, but none of them succeeded. In 1870, James Erskine founded the Bengal Iron Works at a place which is now known as Kulti. The local people used to call it Kendwa karkhana. The open top blast furnaces used raw coal, but there was no demand. The government departments, such as the public works department, used iron castings and so they were interested. The plant was taken over by the government in 1881 and renamed Barakar Iron Works. In 1889, it was taken over by the newly formed Bengal Iron & Steel Co. In 1892, Martin & Company came in as managing agents. Around 1904, Bengal Iron & Steel Co. converted the open top furnaces into closed top furnaces, and installed facilities for producing steel. The steel making facilities went into production but closed down after two years as the operations were unremunerative. In 1918, G.H.Fairhurst took over as general manager of Bengal Iron & Steel Co. By then the company was doing well and even exporting pig iron to Japan, the Far East, Mesopotamia and Russia, but the directors of the company, living in London, were not interested in expanding its business any further.

=== Iron Works at Hirapur ===
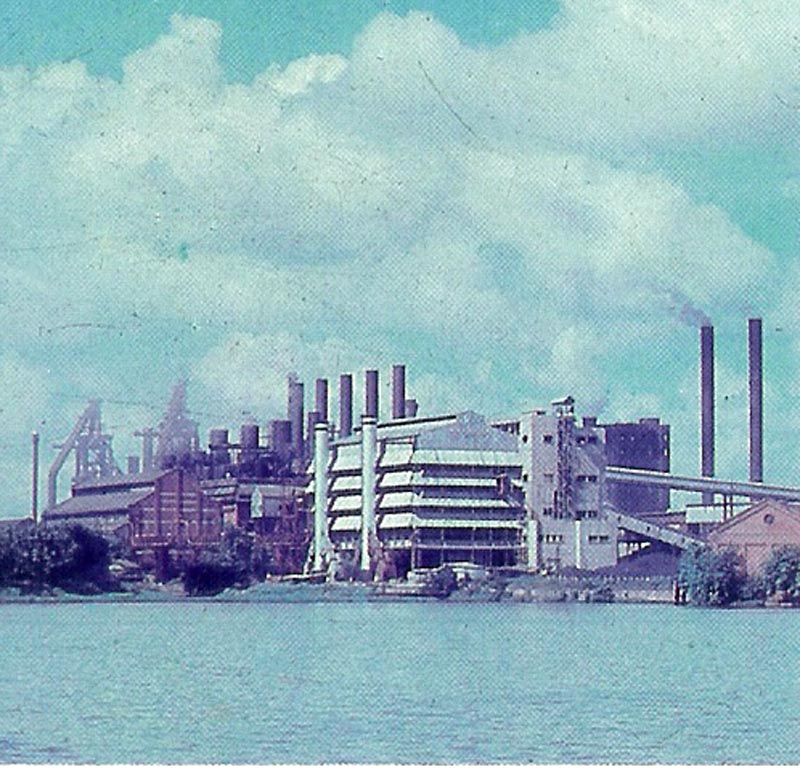
Panoramic view of the old IISCO Plant

Sir Rajen Mookerjee, along with Sir Aquin Martin, had founded Martin & Co. and had a fairly good feel of the iron industry. G.H. Fairhurst was instrumental in drawing in Sir Rajen Mookerjee into a new venture. Promoted by Burn & Co., the Indian Iron and Steel Company was incorporated on 11 March 1918. The iron works were set up at Hirapur, then a small village on the Asansol-Adra line. The railway station was at a neighbouring village, Narsinghbandh. It had two blast furnaces each producing around 700 tonnes per day - the first blast furnace went into operation in 1922 and the second in 1924. Coke oven batteries were added. In the earlier stages, bullock carts were used for transportation in the plant. Amongst those who joined the company in the period were T.Leslie Martin (Sir Acquin's son) and Biren Mukherjee, Sir Rajen's son. He was knighted later. In 1926 the name of the company operating at Kulti was changed to Bengal Iron Company, and in 1936, it was merged with IISCO. G.H. Fairhurst was at the helm of affairs at Burnpur in the earlier days and was succeeded by H.V. Peeling, who served at Burnpur for about quarter of a century. In 1949, I.S. Puri succeeded H.V. Peeling.

From the earliest stages the company felt the need for captive iron ore and coal mines. Prospecting by R. Soubolle in Singhbhum and Manbhum led to the discovery of rich iron ore deposits. In 1901, Bengal Iron Company started mining iron ore in the Duia Mines at Pansiraburu, near Chiria, now in Singhbhum district of Jharkhand. Later mining shifted to Chiria under Manoharpur Ores Mines. Mining started at Gua, also in Singhbhum district, in 1923. The company also entered into coal mining operations at Chasnala (site of the 1975 Chasnala mining disaster), Jitpur (both in Jharia coalfield) and Ramnagar colliery near Kulti.

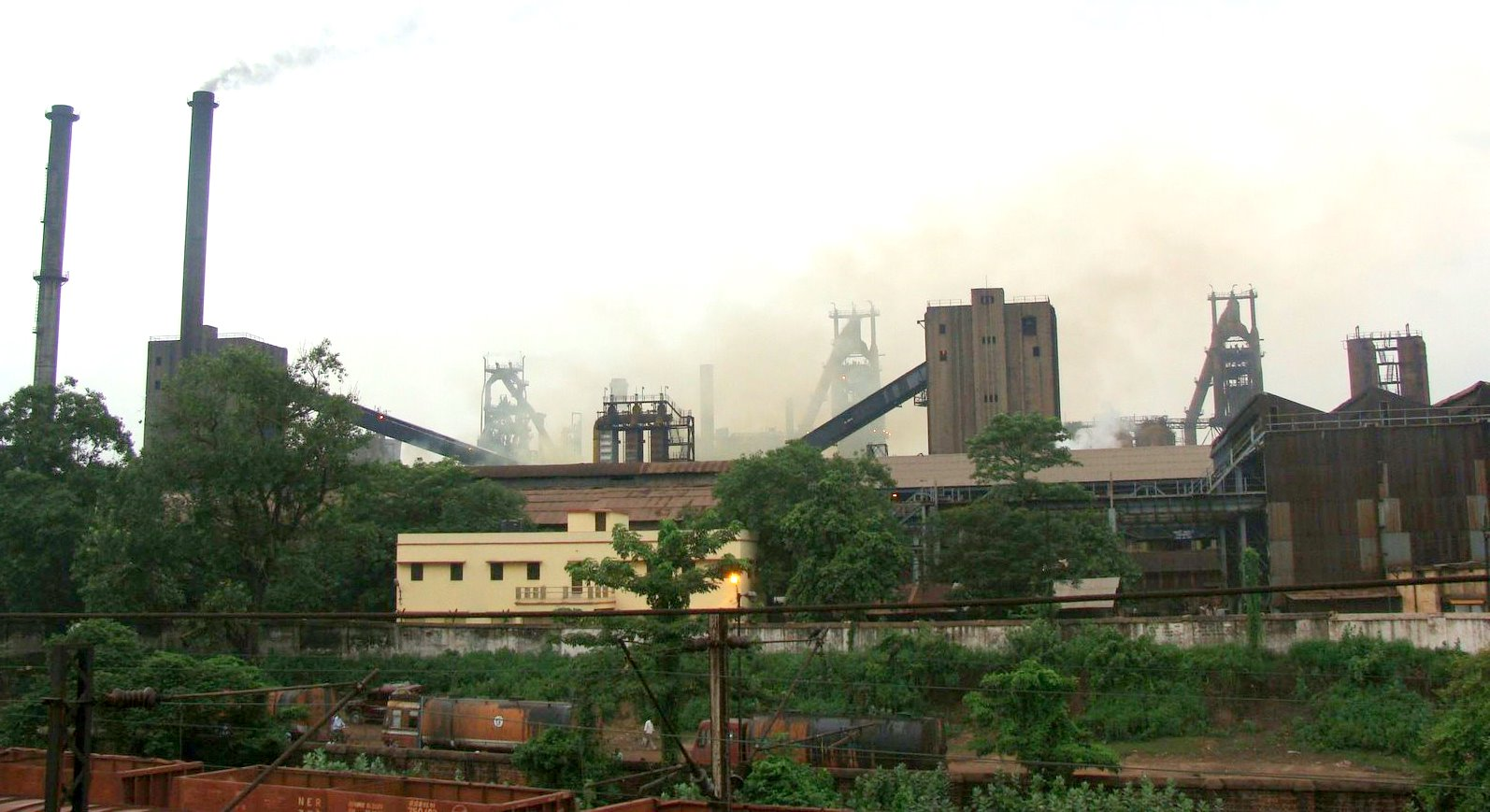
The old IISCO Plant as seen from the township

=== Steel Works at Napuria ===
The Steel Corporation of Bengal was incorporated on 20 April 1937 with Burn & Co. as managing agents. SCOB established steel making facilities at Napuria, adjacent to the Hirapur Works of IISCO. The new steel plant had an annual capacity of 250,000 tonnes of ingot steel, another 100,000 tonnes were added later. The steel works consisted of three 225-tonne tilting open hearth furnaces, soaking pits, a 40" blooming mill of one million tonne capacity, a 34" heavy structural mill and an 18" light structural mill. A sheet mill was added in 1940. The first heat of steel was tapped on 10 November 1939 and rolled subsequently. A duplex plant initially with two Bessemer converters (and subsequently another) was added. The first blow of the Bessemer converter was made on 6 February 1946. Martin and Burn companies formally merged in 1946 to form Martin Burn Limited.

The construction of the steel works brought in many new faces. W.Routledge was the resident engineer of the International Construction Company, the consulting engineers. G.M.Fox and R.T.Lintern became general managers of SCOB. F.W.A.Lahmeyer joined as chief engineer in 1950 and ultimately rose to the position of a general manager. Some senior officers were directly recruited in England. Amongst them was N.R.Dutt, who rose to be a director. John Mc Cracken spent around two decades at the helm of affairs at Burnpur. Sir Biren Mookerjee, as chairman, led a very capable team for about 40 years. The activities evinced interest in people outside it. J.R.D. Tata was a distinguished visitor on 4 October 1944.

SCOB was amalgamated with IISCO on 1 January 1953. In the early fifties Tata Iron & Steel Company and IISCO were the only companies having integrated steel plants in India. It was estimated by a Technical Mission of the World Bank that steel demand in India would touch 6 million tonnes by 1960. Eugene Black, president of the World Bank, visited India in connection with the study of the Technical Mission. He also visited Burnpur. The rising demand for steel paved the way for expansion of IISCO. The foreign exchange component of the expansion programme was met with a loan from the World Bank. The expansion programmes were completed in 1956. Two coke oven batteries, two new blast furnaces, each with a capacity of 1,200 tonnes per day, additional open hearth furnaces (taking the total to seven), Morgan continuous billet mill and a continuous bar and rod mill were added along with many auxiliary facilities. The plant capacity was raised to 1 million tonnes of crude steel per annum.

The Indian Iron & Steel Company (IISCO) was established in 1918 by Sir Rajen Mookerjee. It was amalgamated with the Steel Authority of India in 2006. After Sir Rajen Mookerjee’s death in 1936, his son, Sir Biren Mookerjee took over at the helm of IISCO. Jayanta Roy Chowdhury writes, “In 1953, he signed a US$31.5 million loan agreement with the World Bank to support Burnpur’s expansion, the first time the institution extended financing to a private-sector industrial project. A second agreement followed in 1956, though nearly three-quarters of the expansion and modernisation costs for IISCO were met through internal cash generation, reflecting the strength of the enterprise.”

Kulti Works of IISCO had grown to be a major foundry complex in stages. The light castings foundry was established in 1881, general castings shop in 1915, non-ferrous foundry in 1948, steel foundry and heavy mechanised foundry in 1958. The spun pipe plants (three in number) came up in 1944, 1958 and 1981. The iron making facilities were closed down at Kulti in 1958 and it was decided to supply foundry iron in liquid form from Burnpur. Thus the curtain came down on 83-year long tradition of iron making at Kulti.

While Sir Biren Mookerjee continued to lead with his old team, there were two prominent new faces: S.L.Bengston, head of the consulting firm ICC and S.L.Moffat, who was brought in from the US to boost steel production. Amongst other people in senior positions at Burnpur and Kulti were S.W.Willet, A.E.Crawley, H.H.Drake, S.N.Gupta, J.A.Deshpande, S.K.Kanwar and Samar Sengupta.

=== The rise and fall ===
Production of crude steel at Burnpur rose sharply from 353,427 tonnes in 1953–54 to 914,159 tonnes in 1960–61. Production of ingot steel was 93.5% of the rated capacity in 1961–62. The next year, 1962–63, IISCO surpassed the million-tonne mark for the first time and the tempo of production continued in 1963–64 with a production of 1,026,786 tonnes. For the next two years the production hovered around 94.9% and 97.0%. In 1966–67, it dropped to 89.69%. During the period the production of spun pipes and foundry products at Kulti also reached new heights. It became the first Indian blue chip company to have its shares traded at the London Stock Exchange.IISCO owed its success in both production and profitability to the efficient top management team, who steered the company most effectively. And then it was the beginning of the period of labour unrest.

The first trade union was established in IISCO in 1944. Prof. Abdul Bari was associated with it in the earlier days. After Prof. Bari's death in 1947, Michael John led the trade union for some time. Gopeshwar, who later became national president of the Indian National Trade Union Congress (INTUC), operated at Burnpur and was all along been associated with IISCO. The famous strike in 1953 led to the formation of Action Committee, which later emerged as a wing of the All India Trade Union Congress (AITUC). Since its split, the Centre of Indian Trade Unions (CITU) played a big role in IISCO affairs, their leaders being Chandrasekhar Mukherjee and Bamapada Mukherjee. Taher Hussein remained with AITUC. All the three had earlier been employees of the company. From March 1967 onwards the industrial relations in Burnpur and Kulti, along with other places in West Bengal, underwent dramatic changes. Strikes and go-slow tactics were resorted to in numerous departments, paralysing work in many areas. The newly invented intimidatory tactics of gherao was practiced against the management personnel on the flimsiest of pretexts. Even John McCracken faced severe humiliation.

Sir Biren Mookerjee said, "I see before my eyes a vast industrial complex with which I have been associated for nearly 40 years, crumbling to dust, not as a result of enemy action but by the senseless spirit of destruction of our own citizens. I have left no avenue unexplored to seek a way out of this impasse." The company was sinking.

=== The Public Sector era ===
The Government of India took over the management of IISCO on 14 July 1972. The bill for the take over was piloted in parliament by Mohan Kumaramangalam, then union minister of steel & mines. Initially, M.P.Wadhawan, from Hindustan Steel, was custodian for a short time and then Arabinda Ray, from the private sector, was custodian in 1972–74. H.Bhaya, who was chairman of Hindustan Steel from 1972 to 1977, was also chairman of IISCO in 1974–1975. V.K.Dar, from the ministry of steel, was administrator in 1975-1977 and managing director in 1975–78. The shares of the company were acquired by the government in 1976. With the restructuring of the steel and allied companies in 1978, IISCO became a fully owned subsidiary of Steel Authority of India in 1979. Thereafter, the managing directors, from within SAIL, were D.R.Ahuja, S.Samarapungavan, K.R.Sangameswaran, M.F.Mehta, S.K.Daspatnaik, V.Gujral (acting), K.V.Pai and Nilotpal Roy. The Kulti Works, which was earlier a part of IISCO, has now been brought under the control of Growth Division of SAIL and renamed SAIL Growth Works in 2007 and is functioning as a separate unit since then. IISCO was amalgamated with SAIL in 2006 and renamed IISCO Steel Plant.

== See also ==
- List of countries by steel production
- Durgapur Steel Plant
