= Rakeshwar Pandey =

President, INTUC Jharkhand Indian National Trade Union Congress
- Incumbent
- Assumed office 2012

Personal details
- Born: 14 January 1960 (age 66) Sasaram District, Bihar, India
- Party: Indian National Congress
- Profession: Trade Unionist; Politician

Rakeshwar Pandey (14 January 1960) is President, INTUC Jharkhand Indian National Trade Union Congress, INTUC and is related to Indian National Congress Party, politically. Rakeshwar Pandey stays in Jamshedpur, where he is Union President of over a dozen companies which include various companies of Tata Group, Nuvoco Vistas corp. Ltd India, Indian cable Company, etc. Besides, Pandey is also President of Tisco Mazdoor Union.

Additionally, Rakeshwar Pandey is a Member of Governing Board, Open Forum, development organisation and an NGO based out of New Delhi, for promoting ICTs in the communities.

== Early life ==
Rakeshwar Pandey was born in Sasaram District, Bihar on 14 January 1960 in a very lower-middle-class family. He is married to Sita Pandey. They both have three daughters named Jyoti, Dr. Prity and Reeti.

== Early career ==
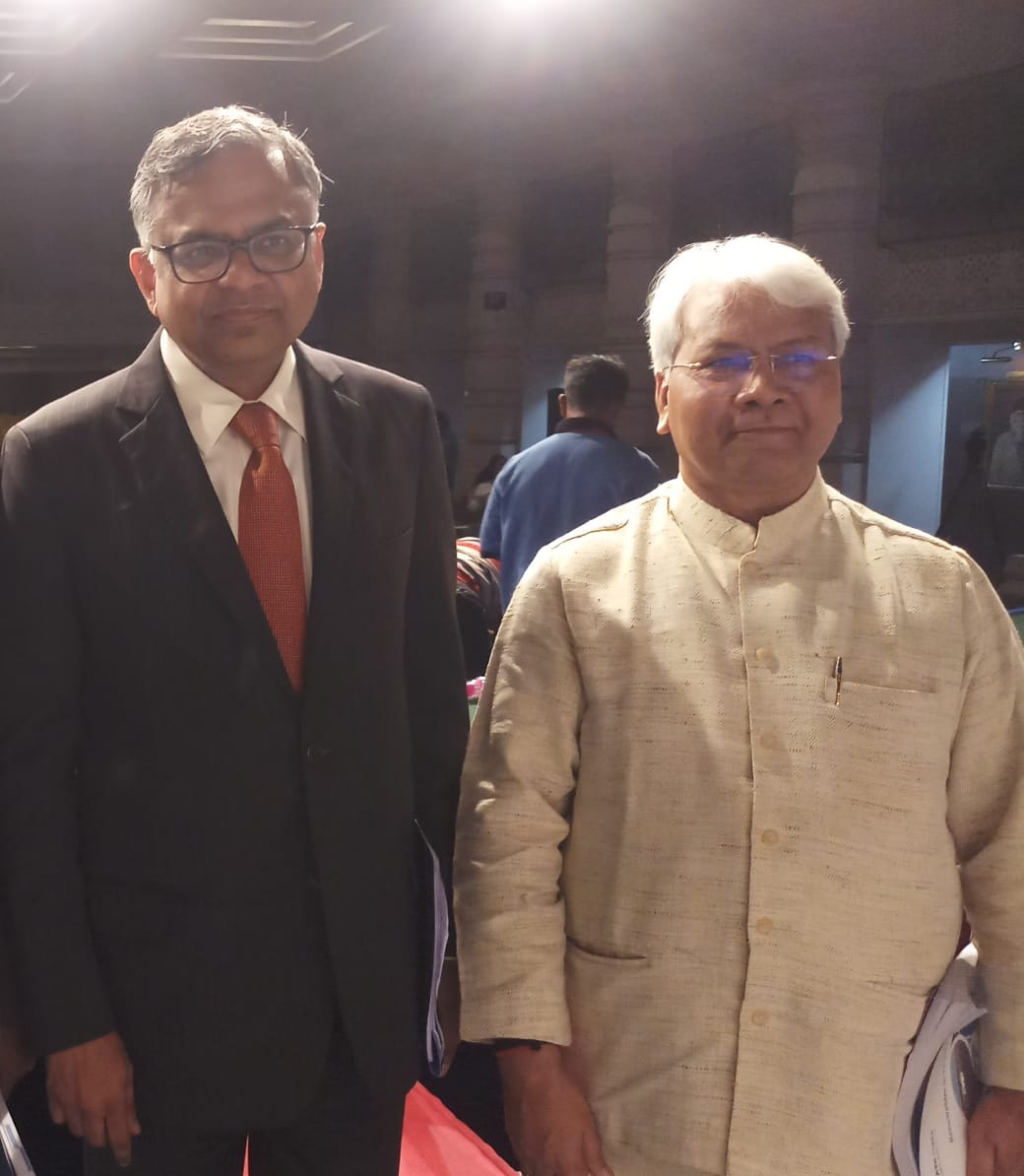
Pandey meeting N. Chandra, Tata Sons, Group Chairman in Mumbai

Rakeshwar Pandey started his career with Tata Steel Growth shop, wherein he joined as apprentice and after few years he became union's general secretary in the same company. Subsequently, he became union president in Tata Steel growth shop in late 90s. He started becoming popular among labourers in Jamshedpur because of his caring and equality for all nature. In few years, Mr. Pandey also became Union President of TRF and Tayo Rolls, a subsidiary of Tata Steel. Afterwards, he has risen in his career very strongly as Union President and in INTUC.

== Positions held ==
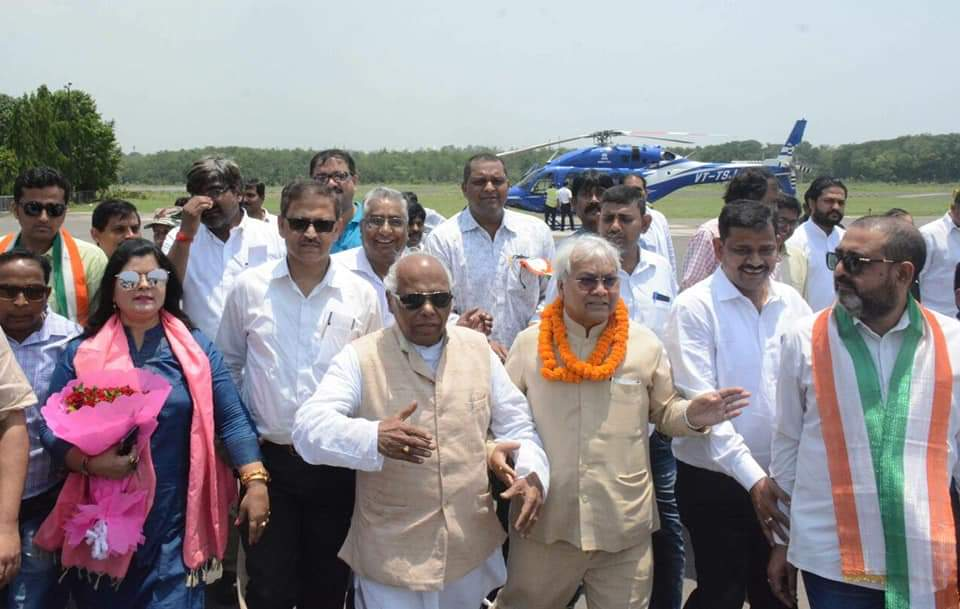
- Dr. G. Sanjeeva Reddy welcomed by Pandey in Jamshedpur
  National Senior Secretary, Indian National Trade Union Congress, INTUC
- General secretary, Indian National Metal Workers' Federation
- Sr. Vice President, Indian National Electricity Workers Federation
- Sr. Vice President, Indian National Cement Workers Federation
- President , INTUC Jharkhand.
- Union President, Tata Power Employees Union
- Union President, Tata Robins Fraser Labour Union
- Union President, TAYO Workers Union
- Union President, Tisco Mazdoor Union
- Union President, JEMCO Employee Union
- Union President, Wire Product Labour Union
- Union President, The Golmuri Tinpate Workers Union
- Union President, INCAB Employees Association
- Union President, Lafarge India Employees Union
- Union President, Tata Bluescope Employees Union
- Union President, Indian Oxygen Workers Union, Jamshedpur
- Union President, Jadugoda Labour Union
- Union President, Neelachal Iron & Power Employees Union
- Union President, Tata Steel Processing And Distribution Employees Union
- Union President, Canteen, Hotel & Restaurant Workers Union
- Union President, Tata Steel Rural Development Workers Union
- Union President, Tata Steel Tribal Cultures Society Workers Union
- Union President, Nico Jubilee Park Employee Union
- Union President, Jharkhand Steel Metal & Mines Employee Union
- Union President, Jharkhand Transport Workers Union
- Union President, Brajraj Ispat Employees Union
- Union President, RSB Transmission Employees Union
- Union President, Bina Metal Employees Union
- Union President, Nutech Employees Union
- Union President, Sonico Employees Union
- Union President, Jamshedpur Hospital Employees Union
- Union President, MTMH Employees Union
- Union President, AIWC Employees Union
- Member, Central Advisory Board of Minimum Wages, Ministry of Labour & Employment, Govt. of India
- Member of Governing Board, Open Forum
- Chairman, Tinplate Union Mahila Mahavidyalaya
- Chairman, Bal Gyanpeeth High School
- Chairman, Radha Krishna Memorial Trust
- Chairman, Singhbhoom Mahila Vikas Manch

Pandey speaks to various social, management, leadership on labour related topics across India such as XLRI, CII & other important places. He is also Union Leader of many other companies in Jamshedpur and other places. He is very active social worker and is involved with NGOs, Hospitals etc.

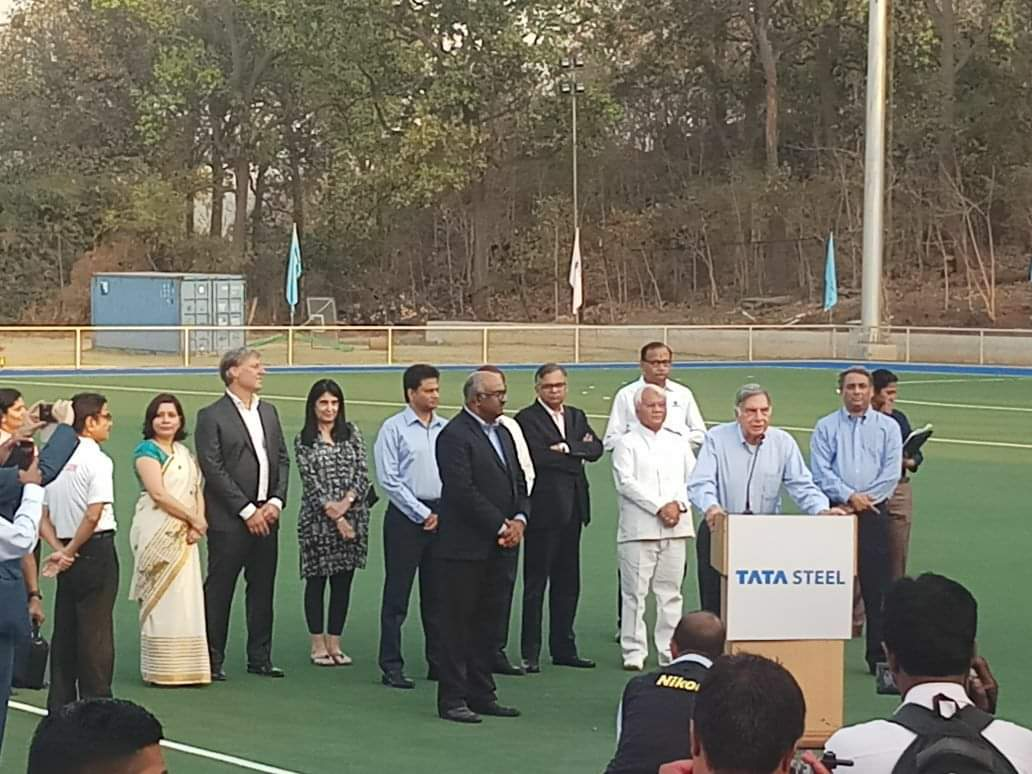
Pandey with Mr. Tata, N. Chandra, T. V. Narendran & Other Tata Management officials

== Representing India ==
Rakeshwar Pandey has represented India in Geneva in 2008, in International Labour Conference. He has been part of Changement in Canada in 2001. In last few years, he has been to United States, China, Sri Lanka & European Countries to participate in discussions & enhancing world's industrial relations which helps labourers across the world.
