= South Asian Regional Trade Union Council =

SARTUC
- South Asian Regional Trade Union Council
- Founded: 1988
- Headquarters: Head Office: 120, Babar Road, New Delhi, India Secretariat: (Kathmandu Office) P.O. Box 3613, Stone House, Sarshmarg, Kathmandu Nepal
- General Secretary: Laxman Basnet
- President: Harbhajan Singh Sidhu
- Website: https://www.sartuc.org/

The South Asian Regional Trade Union Council (SARTUC) is a federation of national trade union centers whose geographic scope covers South Asia. SARTUC's mission is to promote workers' rights within its member nations. The SARTUC represents more than 50 million workers in 7 countries and territories and has 19 national affiliates.

== History ==
The South Asian Regional Trade Union Council was formed in January 1988 by some of the affiliates of the International Confederation of Free Trade Unions (now the ITUC) in countries belonging to the South Asian Association for Regional Cooperation (SAARC)—Afghanistan, Bangladesh, Bhutan, India, Maldives, Nepal, Pakistan and Sri Lanka. The Indian trade union center Indian National Trade Union Congress and Hind Mazdoor Sabha, were the founding members of SARTUC.

Nazrul Islam Khan (then-president of the Bangladesh Metal Workers' Federation) was SAR-TUC's general-secretary in 2003.

== Leadership ==
=== General Secretaries ===
1988: Jamshedpur Gopeshwar
1998: Nazrul Islam Khan
Current: Laxman Basnet

=== Presidents ===
1988: Savumiamoorthy Thondaman
G. Sanjeeva Reddy
Current: Harbhajan Singh Sidhu
