= Bokaro Steel Worker's Union =

Trade union in India

Bokaro Steel Worker's Union Reg.no 275/2021 new jharkhand 1034/62 bihar
- Bokaro Steel Worker's Union
- Founded: 1963 by Bindeshwari Dubey
- Founder: Bindeshwari Dubey
- Headquarters: Sector 3/B 375 Bokaro Steel City, Jharkhand. Pin: 827003
- Location: India
- Key people: Chandrashekhar Dubey
- Affiliations: Indian National Trade Union Congress (INTUC)

Bokaro Steel Worker's Union is a union of workers of Bokaro Steel Plant, Bokaro Steel City, Jharkhand. It was founded by Veteran Trade Unionist and former Chief Minister of Undivided Bihar Bindeshwari Dubey in the year 1963, of which he was its first President. Later he made INTUC President Michael John its president and he himself became its secretary. It is affiliated to ITUC affiliated Indian National Trade Union Congress (INTUC).

== History ==
A picture of Bindeshwari Dubey and Indira Gandhi in a BSWU meeting in Sector 3, Bokaro Steel City, Bihar (now Jharkhand) in the year 1979.

Bindeshwari Dubey was the tallest leader of Bokaro Steel Worker's Union. He was 6 times MLA, one time Lok Sabha and Rajya Sabha MP from each house, variously Minister in Bihar and Central Government and State's Chief Minister. During the low popularity of former PM Indira Gandhi, after the emergency, Dubey kept a meeting in the Union office of BSWU in Sector 3, Bokaro, in 1979 in which she was a chief guest. The city had seen the largest record crowd to date. Dubey was variously Union's president and Secretary from its formation until his death on 20 January 1993 (for 30 years continuously). He was its unanimous leader. Its other prominent leaders' names are H.C.L. Shrivastava, Parmanand Tripathi and Chandrashekhar Dubey.

== Presidents and secretaries ==
No.	President and Tenur ! General Secretary and Tenure	Portrait of General Secretary	Other Important Posts	
1	Bindeshwari Dubey (1963–64)		Fulena Prasad Verma	H.C.L. Shrivastava and Ramadhar Singh (Vice President)
2	Michael John (1964–77)		Bindeshwari Dubey	Ram Narayan Sharma (Working President)
1	Bindeshwari Dubey (1977–93)		H.C.L. Shrivastava (until August 1990), Parmanand Tripathi (1990-93)	Parmanand Tripathi (Working President) (until 1990), D.K.Choubey (Working President) (from 1990), A.K.Tripathi (Vice President)
4	Chandrashekhar Dubey (1993–94)		Parmanand Tripathi	D.K. Choubey (Working President)
5	Kamal Ranjan Dubey 2021 till continue		Chandrashekhar Dubey General Secretary 1994 to 10 July 2025 Abhay kumar Dubey 4 August 2025 to continue	I D Paswan(Working President)

== Controversy ==
In the year 1985 when Union's President Bindeshwari Dubey became Chief Minister of Undivided Bihar he left to Patna, its Working President Parmanand Tripathi and Secretary H.C.L. Shrivastava started fighting to capture the union and its office situated in sector-3 of Bokaro. Consequently, the matter went to court and the office was locked. Then H.C.L. Shrivastava made his other group of the union with the same name and claimed his group as a real Bokaro Steel Worker's Union (BSWU) in August 1990 claiming Parmanand Tripathi had made a fake list of office bearers. Both considered Dubey as their leaders but he had to be on one side so he chose Tripathi.
