= Indian National Electricity Workers' Federation =

Trade union in India

INEWF
- Indian National Electricity Workers' Federation
- Location: India
- Key people: Dr. G. Sanjeeva Reddy (President)
- Affiliations: Indian National Trade Union Congress

Indian National Electricity Workers' Federation is a trade union in India, affiliated to the Indian National Trade Union Congress that organises electricity workers. It had a reported membership of 170,000 in 1970.
