= Indore City B Assembly constituency =

Indore City B
- Former constituency for the State Legislative Assembly

Constituency details
- Country: India
- State: Madhya Bharat
- District: Indore District
- Lok Sabha constituency: Indore
- Established: 1951
- Abolished: 1957

Indore City B was a Legislative Assembly constituency in the Indian state of Madhya Bharat, which elected one member in the 1952 election - the Indian National Congress leader and trade unionist V.V. Dravid represented Indore City B in the Madhya Bharat Legislative Assembly.

== Location and electorate ==
It was located in the southern parts of Indore, and covered the ward 2, 4, 11, 12, 21 and 22 of the City Municipality as well as some villages of the Indore tehsil south of the city boundary.

The constituency had 42,190 registered voters. The electorate of the constituency was largely rural. Indore City B included the commercial hub of Chowni and the Sanyogitaganj market (which both had a large Hindu Baniya population). The Residency area was also within the constituency boundary. The constituency did not have a large working class presence, albeit there were pockets of lower castes and labourer populations in Gadi Adda and the Dalit colony in Juni Indore. There were large populations of Maharashtrian Brahims in Juni Indore and Harsiddhi, and large Muslim populations in Ranipura and Malwi.

The boundaries of the Legislative Assembly constituencies of Indore were redrawn ahead of the 1957 Madhya Pradesh Legislative Assembly election. The southern parts of the city (Juni Indore, Chowni, Residency) were assigned to the new Indore City West constituency, whilst villages outside the city limits were assigned to the new Indore constituency (often referred to as the 'tehsil constituency').

== 1952 election ==
Eight candidates contested the Indore City B seat in the 1952 Madhya Bharat Legislative Assembly election. The constituency was considered as a safe seat for the Indian National Congress, which nominated the Indian National Trade Union Congress leader V.V. Dravid. Dravid won the election by a wide margin, with 13,596 votes (67.79%).

The two other main candidates were G.V. Oke of the Hindu Mahasabha and Homi F. Daji of the Communist Party of India. Oke, a Maharashtrian Braham, was a prominent local leader of his party. Daji was a 26-year old Paris communist organiser, who was largely unknown to the wider public before the election. The 1952 election was the first and only time that Daji contested on a CPI ticket. Daji finished in second place with 2,185 votes (10.89%), and Oke in third place with 2,036 votes (10.15%). Daji obtained significant support from Muslim and Dalit areas (such as from Gadi Adda whilst Oke was mainly supported by voters from Maharashtrian Brahmin and Sindhi refugee communities.

Other candidates in the fray were Arjun Gopikrishnan (independent, 857 votes, 4.27%), Ramnarain Vasudev Vyas (Socialist Party, Hindi-speaking Brahman, 802 votes, 4%), Chandrawati Shankar Lal Kasarliwal (independent, 336 votes, 1.68%), Nirmalarani Motilal Potdar (Kisan Mazdoor Praja Party, Sunar, 123 votes, 0.61%) and Harish Chandra Pannalal (independent, 121 votes, 0.6%). Turn-out stood at 47.54%.
