= Bari Path =

- Road
- Nickname: Abdul Bari Path
- Location in Patna, India Bari Path (Bihar)
- Coordinates: 25°37′11″N 85°10′43″E
- Country: India
- State: Bihar
- City: Patna
- Named for: Professor Abdul Bari

Languages
  - Spoken: Hindi, English
- Time zone: UTC+5:30
- PIN: 800006
- Planning agency: Patna Metropolitan Area Authority

Bari Path is a road in Patna, the capital of Bihar. It was named after Professor Abdul Bari in 1948 following his murder in Khusrupur, Patna. Bari House was situated on this road. Mahatma Gandhi came to Bari House on 29 March 1947, the day after Bari's death. It connects Gandhi Chowk to Gandhi Maidan, runs parallel to Ashok Rajpath. It connects with Ashok Rajpath in many points, such as in Ramna Road, Khazanchi Road.

== Landmarks ==
- Noori Masjid
- Madarsa Islamia Shamsul Hoda
- Hakeem Saleh Dawa Khana
- Ramna Road
- Khazanchi Road
- Machuatoli
- Hathua Market
- P N Anglo Sanskrit School
