= Lok Bhavan, Odisha =

Lok Bhavan, Odisha may refer to:

- Lok Bhavan, Bhubaneswar, official summer residence of the governor of Odisha, located in Bhubaneswar.
- Lok Bhavan, Puri, official winter residence of the governor of Odisha, located in Puri.
