= S. R. Vasavada =

Indian socialist

Shamprasad Rupshanker Vasavada (27 March 1903 – 20 November 1972) was an Indian trade union leader.

Born in Junagadh princely state, Vasavada studied at Bahauddin College, and then at Bombay University. In 1927, he moved to Ahmedabad to study at the College of Law, supporting himself by teaching at the Proprietary High School. In protest at the arrest of Vallabhbhai Patel, he refused to attend an examination, and so did not graduate. In 1929, he left education, to begin working for the Textile Labour Association of Ahmedabad. He led a local prohibition movement, which was successful in largely banning alcohol in the city. Following the Gandhi–Irwin Pact of 1931, he relocated to Indore, to lead the labour movement in the region. However, he returned to Ahmedabad around the start of 1933.

Vasavada was elected as a councillor in Ahmedabad in 1936. In 1937, he undertook a national tour, to find promising young labour activists, who he brought to the city and trained in union leadership. He became editor of the Textile Labour Association's journal, Majur Sandesh, in 1940, and in 1946, he became joint secretary of the organisation. In the same year, he was the founding president of the Indian National Textile Workers' Federation. He was imprisoned in 1942 for his pro-independence activities. In 1947, he was a founding member of the Indian National Trade Union Congress (INTUC), with many of its leaders being activists he had trained. In 1950, he was elected as a member of the Bombay Legislative Assembly, standing down as a councillor. From 1953 to 1955, and again from 1956 to 1958, he was president of INTUC.

Vasavada was elected to the Lok Sabha in 1962. In 1968, he was awarded the Padma Bhushan. On his death, in 1972, INTUC described him as "the moving spirit behind the organisation for over two decades".

Trade union offices
Preceded by Michael John	President of the Indian National Trade Union Congress; 1953–1955	Succeeded by G. D. Ambekar
Preceded by G. D. Ambekar	President of the Indian National Trade Union Congress; 1956–1958	Succeeded by Gopala Ramanujam
