= Indian National Metal Workers' Federation =

Trade union in India

The Indian National Metal Workers' Federation (INMF) is an Indian trade union that represents workers in the metal industry.

== History ==
The union was founded in 1959 as the Indian National Iron and Steel Workers' Federation. It brought together several smaller unions, including the Golmuri Tinplate Workers' Union, Iron and Steel Workers' Union, Khumardhubi Workers' Union, and Tata Workers' Union. Like its predecessors, it affiliated to the Indian National Trade Union Congress.

== Leadership ==
=== Presidents ===
1959: Michael John
1977: V. G. Gopal
1993: Nand Kishore Bhatt
2010: G. Sanjeeva Reddy

=== General Secretaries ===
1959: Jamshedpur Gopeshwar
2021: Raghunath Pandey
