= B. Satya Narayan Reddy =

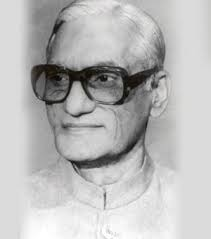

Governor of Odisha
- In office 1 June 1993 – 17 June 1995
- Preceded by: Saiyid Nurul Hasan
- Succeeded by: Gopala Ramanujam

Governor of West Bengal (Additional charge)
- In office 13 July 1993 – 14 August 1993
- Preceded by: Saiyid Nurul Hasan
- Succeeded by: K. V. Raghunatha Reddy

Governor of Uttar Pradesh
- In office 12 February 1990 – 25 May 1993
- Preceded by: Mohammed Usman Arif
- Succeeded by: Motilal Vora

Personal details
- Born: 21 August 1927 Mahbubnagar, Hyderabad State, British India
- Died: 6 October 2012 (aged 85) Hyderabad, Andhra Pradesh, India
- Profession: Politician

B. Satya Narayan Reddy (21 August 1927 – 6 October 2012) was a freedom fighter, Socialist politician and a former Governor of Uttar Pradesh, Odisha and West Bengal.

Reddy died at the age of 85 on 6 October 2012 in Hyderabad.

== Early life ==
Reddy belonged to an agricultural family from Annaram village Shadnagar in the Mehboobnagar district of Telangana. He was educated at the Nizam College in Hyderabad and graduated in law from the Osmania University.

== Freedom Fighter ==
Reddy, then only 14, participated in the Quit India Movement in 1942 and was arrested for taking out a students' procession protesting Gandhi's arrest. He later participated in the Hyderabad Peoples' Movement in 1947 where he organised a satyagraha movement against the Nizam's Rule for which he was arrested and imprisoned at the Chanchalguda Jail for 6 months. During his time in prison he edited the Payam-e-Nav, a weekly he circulated among his prison mates.

== Political career ==
Inspired by Acharya Narendra Dev, Jaiprakash Narayan and Ram Manohar Lohia, Reddy became a part of the Socialist Movement. He was a participant in Vinobha Bhave's Bhoodan Movement. Staying out of the Congress fold, he was variously associated with the Socialist Party, the Janata Party and the Lok Dal. As a nominee of the Janata Party he was elected to the Rajya Sabha in 1978. In 1983 he joined the Telugu Desam Party and was re-elected to the Rajya Sabha as its nominee in 1984.

== Gubernatorial Tenures ==
Reddy served as the governor of Uttar Pradesh from 12 February 1990 to 25 May 1993 and as the Governor of Odisha from 1 June 1993 to 17 June 1995. He also held additional charge of the Governor of West Bengal between 13 July 1993 and 14 August 1993. He was the Governor of Uttar Pradesh when the Babri Masjid was demolished.

== Global policy ==
He was one of the signatories of the agreement to convene a convention for drafting a world constitution. As a result, for the first time in human history, a World Constituent Assembly convened to draft and adopt the Constitution for the Federation of Earth.
