= Hawthorne Lewis =

Member of the Indian Civil Service

Sir Hawthorne Lewis

2nd Governor of Odisha
- In office 1 April 1941 – 31 March 1946
- Preceded by: John Austen Hubback
- Succeeded by: Chandulal Madhavlal Trivedi

Sir (William) Hawthorne Lewis, KCSI, KCIE (29 June 1888 – 19 October 1970) was a member of the Indian Civil Service who served as the Governor of Odisha from 1941 to 1946. Born to Thomas Crompton Lewis at Kasauli, Shimla.

Educated at Oundle School and Gonville and Caius College, Cambridge, Lewis entered the Indian Civil Service by examination in 1911 and served Orissa in various capacities beginning as Assistant Magistrate and Collector.

He married Alice Margaret Rose Hewitt in 1929 who a widow of Lieutenant Ronald Erskine Hewitt (who perished in the First World War) a resident of 7 Hastings Road, New Delhi, which today is the designated home for the Chief Justice of India. Alice was the daughter of George Edgar Woodhouse, Nordon, Blanford, Dorset. He later married Geraldine Susan Maud de Montmorency.

In 1927 he was appointed as an officer (Joint Secretary) on special duty in the Reforms Office, which considered amendments to the Constitution and Government of India Act 1919. During his tenure the Reforms Office was very vocal towards temerity of laws pertaining to an existence of an 'emergency' during a Governmental or Governor General invoked ordnance. So as to deter decision makers and not use state sponsored violence as allowed in a statute which would in turn allow the Governor General of India to do as he pleased. During his tenure in the Reforms Office, he was also boss to V.P Menon.

He laid the foundation stone for the Hirakud Dam in 1946. One of the other major contributions of Hawthorne as Governor of Orissa is that he gave assent to act of legislation which sanctioned for the foundation of the Utkal University on 27 November 1943 being inaugurated on 1 November 1944 under a proposal from the cabinet of the then Prime Minister of Orissa, Krushna Chandra Gajapati.

At the mid-term of governorship of Odisha province, there were only five colleges in the province as per a report by the Statesman published in 1945.

Lewis died in 1970 at Salisbury, Wiltshire, England.

Preceded by John Austen Hubback	Governor of Odisha; 1 April 1941 – 31 March 1946	Succeeded by Chandulal Madhavlal Trivedi
