= Indian National Mineworkers' Federation =

Trade union in India

The Indian National Mineworkers' Federation (INMF) is a trade union representing miners in India.

== History ==
The union was founded in 1949 on the initiative of the Indian National Trade Union Congress, bringing together numerous regional unions of miners. It grew steadily, having 150,000 members by 1960, and 351,000 by 1997, at which time the federation had 139 affiliated unions.

By 2017, the union represented 40% of the workers for Coal India, the government-owned coal producer in India.

== Leadership ==
=== General Secretaries ===
c.1960: Kanti Mehta
1980: Sudhendu Das Gupta
c.1990: Bindeshwari Dubey
c.2000- Present S. Q. Zama

=== Presidents ===
1952: Michael John
1970s: Kanti Mehta
1980s: Bindeshwari Dubey
1990s: Sudhendu Das Gupta
c.2000- 2021 Rajendra prasad
2021- Present: Anup Singh, MLA
