= Jamshedpur Gopeshwar =

Indian trade unionist and politician

Jamshedpur Gopeshwar (21 December 1921 – 23 May 2008), usually known simply as Gopeshwar, was an Indian trade unionist and politician.

Gopeshwar was born in Rampur, in the Bhagalpur District now in Saharsa district, and studied at Patna University. He supported Indian independence, and participated in the student movement from 1940, then became a supporter of Gandhi. In 1948, he became the principal of the Model Institute in Bhagalpur, then became active in the labour movement. From 1950 until 1954, he served on the Bihar Central Labour Advisory Board.

Gopeshwar began working in the steel industry, and was elected to many related trade union posts, including secretary of the Indian National Metal Workers' Federation, of the THLCO Workers' Union in Jamshedpur, and of the Asansol Iron and Steel Workers' Union, Burnpur; and president of the Tube Company Workers' Union, Tinplate Workers' Union in Jamshedpur, Gua Mines Workers' Union, and Hindustan Steel Workers' Union in Durgapur.

Gopeshwas was a supporter of the Indian National Congress, and was elected to represent Jamshedpur in the 8th Lok Sabha. From 1987 until 1997, he served as general secretary of the Indian National Trade Union Congress, and he was also active at the international level. From 1982, he was a vice-president of the International Confederation of Free Trade Unions, he was the founding leader of the South Asian Regional Trade Union Council in 1988, and from 1989 to 1994 he was the president of the ICFTU Asia and Pacific Regional Organisation.

Trade union offices
Preceded by Union founded	General Secretary of the Indian National Metal Workers' Federation; 1959–2008	Succeeded by Rajasekhar Mantri
Preceded by Tadanobu Usami	President of the ICFTU Asia and Pacific Regional Organisation; 1989–1994	Succeeded by Ken Douglas
Lok Sabha
Preceded by Rudra Pratap Sarangi	Member of the Lok Sabha for Jamshedpur; 1984–1989	Succeeded by Shailendra Mahato
