= K. V. Raghunatha Reddy =

Indian politician

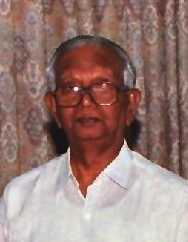

6th Governor of Tripura
- In office 12 February 1990 – 14 August 1993
- Preceded by: Sultan Singh
- Succeeded by: Romesh Bhandari

14th Governor of West Bengal
- In office 14 August 1993 – 27 April 1998
- Preceded by: B. Satya Narayan Reddy (additional charge)
- Succeeded by: Akhlaqur Rahman Kidwai

Governor of Odisha
- In office 31 January 1997 – 12 February 1997
- Preceded by: Gopala Ramanujam
- Succeeded by: Gopala Ramanujam

Governor of Odisha
- In office 12 November 1997 – 27 April 1998
- Preceded by: Gopala Ramanujam
- Succeeded by: C. Rangarajan

Governor of Sikkim
- In office 13 December 1995 – 9 February 1996

Governor of Manipur
- In office 20 March 1995 – 30 August 1995

Union Minister Of Labour and Rehabilitation (Minister for state - independent charge)
- In office 05 February 1973 - 09 November 1973
- Preceded by: Raghunath Keshav Khadilkar
- Succeeded by: K. V. Raghunatha Reddy

Union Minister Of Labour (Minister for state - independent charge)
- In office 09 November 1973 - 24 March 1977
- Preceded by: K. V. Raghunatha Reddy
- Succeeded by: Ravindra Varma

Personal details
- Born: 4 September 1924
- Died: 4 March 2002 (aged 77)

K. V. Raghunatha Reddy (4 September 1924 – 4 March 2002) was an Indian politician. He served three terms as Member of Rajya Sabha from Andhra Pradesh during the period 1962-68, 1968–74 and 1974-1980. He served as the Governor of Tripura (1990–1993), the Governor of West Bengal (1993–1998) and the Governor of Odisha (31 January 1997 - 12 February 1997 and 13 December 1997 – 27 April 1998). He also worked as union labour minister.
