= Indian National Defence Workers' Federation =

Trade union in India

INDWF
- Indian National Defence Workers' Federation
- Location: India
- Secretary General: C. Srikumar
- Affiliations: Indian National Trade Union Congress

The Indian National Defence Workers Federation (INDWF) is a trade union in India, affiliated to the Indian National Trade Union Congress, that organizes civilian workers in factories and other establishments under the Ministry of Defence.
