= Noori Masjid =

Mosque in Patna, Bihar

Religion
- Affiliation: Islam
- District: Patna district

Location
- Location: Madarsa Shamsul Huda, Ashok Rajpath/Bari Path, Patna, Bihar
- Municipality: Patna Municipal Corporation
- State: Bihar
- Country: India

Architecture
- Founder: Syed Noorul Huda

Noori Masjid is a mosque under Madarsa Islamiya Shamsul Huda, Patna in Bihar. The mosque is located between Bari Path and Ashok Rajpath near Science College, Patna.

It was named after Syed Noorul Huda, who donated his land for both the madrasa (seminary) and the mosque.
