= John Hubback =

Sir John Hubback KCSI

1st Governor of Orissa
- In office 1 April 1936 – 11 August 1938
- Preceded by: Office Created
- Succeeded by: Sir George Townsend Boag
- In office 8 December 1938 – 31 March 1941
- Preceded by: Sir George Townsend Boag
- Succeeded by: Sir Hawthorne Lewis

Personal details
- Born: 1878
- Died: 1968 (aged 89–90)

Sir John Austen Hubback, KCSI (27 February 1878 – 8 May 1968) was a British administrator in India who was the first Governor of Orissa.

Educated at Winchester College and King's College, Cambridge, Hubback entered the Indian Civil Service in 1902. A member of the Executive Council, Bihar and Orissa, from 1935 to 1936, he was Governor of Orissa between 1936 and 1941, when he retired. He was adviser to Secretary of State for India between 1942 and 1947.

Preceded by Office Created	Governor of Orissa; 1 April 1936 – 11 August 1938	Succeeded by Sir George Townsend Boag
Preceded by Sir George Townsend Boag	Governor of Orissa; 8 December 1938 - 31 March 1941	Succeeded by Sir Hawthorne Lewis
