= Abdul Bari (professor) =

Indian politician

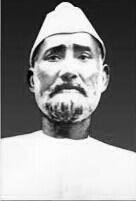
- Born: Abdul Bari; 1892; Kansua, Jehanabad Bihar Bombay Presidency, British India
- Died: 28 March 1947 (aged 54–55); Khusrupur, Bihar Province, British India
- Cause of death: Shot near Fatuah Railway Crossing
- Resting place: Peermohani Qabristan, Patna
- Occupation: President of Tata Worker's Union
- Years active: 1917–1947
- Organization: Tata Steel Workers Union
- Known for: Played active role to unite worker section of Bihar, Bengal and Orissa for freedom struggle movement in 1921, 1922 and 1942
- Term: 1936–1947
- Predecessor: Subhas Chandra Bose
- Successor: Michael John
- Political party: Indian National Congress
- Movement: Quit India Movement

Abdul Bari (1892–1947) was an Indian freedom activist, academic and social reformer. He sought to bring about social reform in Indian society by awakening people through education. He had a vision of India free from slavery, social inequality, and communal disharmony. He took part in the freedom movement, for which he was killed. He was against the Two-nation theory.

== Early life and education ==
Abdul Bari was born on 21 January 1884 to Md Qurban Ali as the eldest of 4 children. He was born in Kansua but was a resident of Koilwar. He was a descendant of Malik Ibrahim Baya, a 14th century sufi saint and warrior.

He got admitted in the T. K. Ghosh Academy, Patna and completed his matriculation from the same. Later in 1918, he completed Master of Arts from Patna University.

In 1937, he made his first historical agreement with the TISCO (now Tata Steel) management.

Bari served as the president of the Bihar Pradesh Congress Committee from 1946 until his death on 28 March 1947. He was killed by three men who shot at him after an altercation by Bari Path in Khusrupur, Bihar Province, during a stopover on his return from Dhanbad to Patna. In his tribute, Mahatma Gandhi stated that Bari "lived like a fakir in the service of his countrymen." Then Congress President J. B. Kripalani said, "His death has robbed India [sic] one of its bravest and most selfless soldiers of freedom. He was utterly free from communal bias and knew himself only as an Indian. His was a dedicated life filled with a passion for the service of the working classes."

On the first death anniversary of Bari, Rajendra Prasad recalled his contribution to the nation through a message dated 22 March 1948 published in Mazdur Avaz.

== Personal life ==
Abdul Bari was married to Zulaikha Begum, a resident of Koilwar. They had 2 sons (Salahuddin Bari and Shahabuddin Bari) and 3 daughters (Tahira, Hamida, Saeeda) together.

== Legacy ==
The Government of Bihar named Bari Path, a Road and Abdul Bari Bridge, a Bridge as a tribute to Abdul Bari.

On March 20, 2021 and On March 28, 2024, The Tata Workers Union led by Sanjiv Kumar Chowdhary, the president of TWU paid tribute to Abdul Bari on his death anniversary.

== Sources ==
- Dr. Rajendra Prasad: Correspondence and Select documents Volume 8 by Valmiki Choudhary published by Centenary Publication
- At the feet of Mahatma Gandhi by Rajendra Prasad published by Asia Publication House
- History of the Freedom Movement in Bihar by Kalikinkar Datta published by Govt. of Bihar.
- Bihar through the Ages by Ritu Chaturvedi published by Sarup & Sons
- My Days With Gandhi by Nirmal Kumar Bose
- Working together: Labour-management Co-operation in Training and in Technological and other Changes by Alan Gladstone, Muneto Ozaki published by International Labour Office, Geneva
- The Politics of the Labour Movement: An Essay on Differential Aspirations by Dilip Simeon
- History of The Indian Iron and Steel Co. Ltd by Dr. N.R.Srinivasan
- Official website of Tata Workers Union
