= Thoppil Varghese Antony =

Indian Civil Servant

Thoppil Varghese Antony (1933 – 2020) was a Padma Bhushan-winning 1956 batch Indian Administrative Service officer of the Tamil Nadu cadre. He served as Chief Secretary of Tamil Nadu, Chairman of the Tamil Nadu State Planning Commission, Chairman, Tamil Nadu Electricity Board (TNEB), Commissioner and Secretary, Planning and Development Department, Special Officer, Corporation of Madras, and Joint Secretary in the Ministry of Health and Family Welfare, Government of India. His father T.A.Varghese, ICS also served as the Chief Secretary of Madras State from 1964 to 1965.

== Education ==
Antony graduated with a B.Sc. in chemistry from Loyola College, Chennai, and earned a Bachelor of Laws from Madras Law College. He secured a high rank in the 1956 Union Public Service Commission (UPSC) Examination, and was selected for the IAS.

== Contributions ==
=== Population stabilization ===
Antony spearheaded Tamil Nadu’s demographic transition, reducing the state’s Crude Birth Rate from 28 to 19 per 1,000 between 1984 and 1994. He pioneered Mass Family Planning Camps in Thanjavur (1971–72), later adopted statewide. His holistic approach integrated women’s literacy, delayed marriage, child spacing, and maternal nutrition.

=== Agricultural development ===
In Thanjavur, Tamil Nadu’s “rice bowl,” he promoted high-yielding rice varieties, modern farming practices, and robust supply chains for agricultural inputs, significantly boosting productivity.
