= Vyanktesh Vishnu Dravid =

Indian politician and unionist (1913–1994)

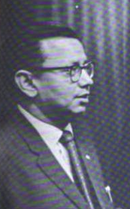
Dravid in 1965

Vyanktesh Vishnu Dravid (10 August 1913 – 1994) was an Indian politician and trade unionist. He was the Labour Minister in the state governments of Madhya Bharat and Madhya Pradesh from 1952 to 1964. Dravid was a key figure in the labour movement in Indore and Madhya Pradesh for many years, as an influential leader of the Indian National Trade Union Congress (INTUC) and the Indore Mill Mazdoor Sangh.

== Early life ==
Dravid was born on 10 August 1913, in Aligarh, British Raj. His parents were Vishnu and Lakshmibai. They came from a South Indian Brahman family, which had been assimilated into Marathi culture in Nagpur. They had been traditionally orthodox but adapted to modernization.

Dravid obtained a B.Sc. degree from Victoria College in Gwalior in 1934. He worked at the Institute of Plant Industry in Indore. Dravid was introduced to labour organising through his maternal uncle N.H. Dravid, who was the leader of the Textile Labour Association in Indore. N.H. Dravid was a disciple of Gulzarilal Nanda and Khandubhai Kasanji Desai. N.H. Dravid recommended his nephew to go to Ahmedabad for a political apprenticeship there in the labour movement. In 1937 V.V. Dravid went to Ahmedabad, where he worked for the Textile Labour Association under the tutelage of Gulzarilal Nanda. Dravid played a key role in the Indore Textile Inquiry Committee.

== Career ==
=== Building the IMMS ===
In the period leading up to World War II the textile workers union movement in Indore had come under communist control. Maharaja Yashwant Rao Holkar II requested support from pro-Congress trade unions. In response Gulzarilal Nanda sent Dravid and Ramsingh Bhai Verma to Indore to build a pro-Congress textile workers trade union to compete with the communists. They founded the Indore Mill Mazdoor Sangh in December 1941. Dravid and Verma emerged as popular leaders and came to constitute a faction in the Indian National Congress in Indore. Dravid and Verma were arrested during the 1942 Quit India movement, and spent nearly a year and a half in detention. In jail, they befriended Gangaram Tiwari, whom they recruited to IMMS. They were released in late 1943, after which the IMMS was reactivated. By 1943 IMMS had some 1,760 members. By 1945, the IMMS membership had grown to around 5,000. Apart from regular trade union activities, IMMS also engaged in social welfare activities and setting up workers housing colonies.

Dravid was a founding member of the Indian National Trade Union Congress in 1947, and served as its organisational secretary for three years. Dravid represented the IMMS in the Central Working Committee of INTUC. In 1951 he was elected as one of the vice presidents of INTUC. He was also a member of the Central Labour Committee of the Indian National Congress.

He served as the Minister-in-Charge of Local Self-Government and Labour in the first popular government cabinets in Indore State in 1947, as Minister of Commerce, Industries and Labour in Madhya Bharat in 1948. Dravid supervised the Labour Commissioner A. S. Banawalikar, who drew up the Banawalikar Report which would become the prescriptive basis for labour legislations of Madhya Bharat and Madhya Pradesh. When the state of Madhya Bharat was constituted Dravid did not join the cabinet himself, but the Labour portfolio was given to INTUC allies under Dravid's influence.

=== 1952 elections ===
As of the 1952 elections there were three main factions in the party, the Nai Duniya faction (representing the former Praja Mandal movement), the Khadiwala faction (Hindi-speaking Brahmans) and the labour faction of Verma and Dravid. The labour faction and Nai Duniya faction got two seats each to contest in the 1952 Madhya Bharat Legislative Assembly election whilst the Khadiwala faction got the Indore Lok Sabha seat. The labour faction candidates were Verma and Dravid. Dravid contested the Indore City B constituency, which was located to the south of the city, was considered a safe seat for the Congress Party and which had a predominately rural electorate. Verma, on the other hand, contested the constituency were most of the labourers lived.

Dravid won the Indore City B seat by a wide margin, obtaining 13,596 votes (67.79%).

=== Madhya Bharat Labour Minister ===
Dravid became a cabinet minister in the Madhya Bharat state government after the 1952 election, holding the ministerial portfolios of Development, Labour and Local Self-Government. The Chief Minister Mishrilal Gangwal, Manohar Singh Mehta of the Nai Duniya faction and Dravid formed a trio of Indore-based leaders that dominated the Madhya Bharat cabinet until 1954. Dravid had close ties with the Nai Duniya faction and the former princely state bureaucracy. Jones (1974) writes that "[w]ith the exception of Chief Ministers, there does not seem to have been any other political leader in Madhya Bharat or Madhya Pradesh politics who successfully combined and utilized so large an array of interrelated and mutually supportive portfolios and strategically situated bureaucrats for the concentrated satisfaction of a large urban constituency as Dravid did for textile labor."

Between 1953 and 1955, his ministerial portfolios were Development, Labour, Public Health (Engineering) including Town Improvement and Housing. Dravid played a key role in setting up workers housing estates in Indore through state funds. Per Jones (1974) Dravid successfully orchestrated "the regulatory and patronage powers of the line agencies under his command, together with those of the [Indore Improvement Trust] and municipality, Dravid was in a few short years able to produce an impressive set of concrete improvements on behalf of the textile laborers in the city". For example, in 1954 Dravid managed to get budget approval for a 230,000 Indian rupee project for development of the textile labour area in Pardesipura and its immediate surroundings - setting up water wells, water storage tanks and building roads in the area.

Dravid and Verma worked closely together during two decades, with Dravid representing the labour faction within the state government and Verma being the main organiser. Per Jones (1974) there were "differences in their social origins, leadership styles, and personalities. Dravid fits the pundit (priestly) stereotype—a high-status Brahman, a bachelor, earned, intelligent, devotional and restrained in manner, simple in dress, and disciplined in his habits. He spends much of his leisure time reading, writing, and in meditation. He has little enthusiasm for barnstorming or public speaking campaigns, and apparently has a Gandhian aversion to open violence. His personal support among laborers derives to a considerable extent from his Gandhian style, his devotion to the laborers' welfare, and his personal austerity. Dravid's contribution to the partnership has been intellectual (that of a legal strategist), symbolic (high status and Gandhian style), and most important of all, his links with extra-local sources of power and authority: his regular position as Cabinet minister in the state government, and his ties with the Brahman leaders in the Congress high command and the national leadership of INTUC."

In 1956 Dravid became the Minister of Labour, Public Health (Engineering), Housing and Agriculture. Dravid was a member of the Social Welfare Branch of the Planning Commission.

=== Municipal election and the Mohalla Sudhar Samiti movement ===
Dravid wished for the localities of Pardesipura and Nandanagar, the areas with the largest textile worker population, to be incorporated into Indore city. Whilst the Indore city council initially resisted this move, by late 1954 the merger occurred. Dravid built up a grassroots network of Mohalla Sudhar Samitis (neighbourhood improvement associations) under the supervision of Verma and with participation of Tiwari and Mathuralal Sharma. Effectively the Mohalla Sudhar Samitis came to function as a parallel Congress Party structure. The Mohalla Sudhar Samitis were organised in each neighbourhood by IMMS members and employees living in the local area. Through mobilisation of communities through the Mohalla Sudhar Samitis, whereby community members were enlisted as primary members of the Congress Party Dravid and Verma could take control over formal Congress Party structures. First they seized control over Congress Mandal Committees, eventually paving the way to become the majority block in the Indore City Congress Committee. In 1955 the labour faction managed to seize control over the Indore City Congress organisation, installing Tiwari as its new president.

The majority of candidates for the 1955 Indore municipal election take from the labour faction. The takeover of the Indore City branch of the party prompted the Nai Duniya and Khadiwala factions to bond together to counter Verma and Dravid's influence. For the Nai Duniya and Khadiwala groups, Verma and Dravid continued to be viewed as 'outsiders' to the city.

=== Madhya Pradesh Labour Minister ===
Ahead of the 1957 Madhya Pradesh Legislative Assembly election Dravid was nominated as the Congress Party candidate in the Indore constituency (also known as 'the tehsil constituency'), located east of the labour area. The constituency was largely rural, and included villages such as Khajrana, Khajrani, Piplia Hana, Musakhedi, Harsola and Kampel. Dravid won the seat, obtaining 11,439 votes (60.42%).

After the 1957 election, Dravid became the Minister of Labour, Rehabilitation, Housing, Chambal Project of Madhya Pradesh. In 1958 Dravid was one of ten Indore city aldermen nominated by the state government. Dravid attended the International Labour Organization conferences in Geneva thrice - the first time as a workers delegate, second time as the leader of the Indian delegation and the third time as the government delegate in 1959.

Relations between INTUC and the Madhya Pradesh state government deteriorated in 1959, and the Madhya Pradesh branch of INTUC adopted a resolution rejecting the 'conservative and reactionary outlook' of the state government. Nevertheless, Congress state government patronage of INTUC continued, and in September 1959, Dravid introduced the Industrial Relations and Trade Unions Amendment Bill - a piece of legislation that entailed that the state Labour Ministry would only entertain requests from officially recognised unions. The communist unions protested against the Bill, organizing rallies against it. The Verma-led INTUC organised a protest in favour of the Bill, but this rally was banned by the State government under Section 144 (Unlawful Assembly). Verma and other INTUC organisers were arrested weeks later, accused of defying the Section 144 order of the state government. The arrest, and later conviction, of Verma marked a low point in INTUC-state government relations, in which the central INTUC machinery supported Verma.

=== Dravid-Verma split ===
Dravid retained the Indore constituency seat in the 1962 Madhya Pradesh Legislative Assembly election, obtaining 12,506 votes (47.48%). Verma stood as the Congress Party candidate in the Indore Lok Sabha seat in the 1962 Indian general election. Verma's parliamentary candidature became the move would break the dominance of the INTUC faction in Indore, and rupture the two decades of partnership of Verma and Dravid. The scenario of the INTUC faction holding the parliamentary seat worried local Jain Congress supporters, fearing a total INTUC dominance over city politics. Mill owners opposed Verma's candidature. Verma was defeated in the parliamentary election by the young communist labour leader Homi F. Daji, finishing in second place with 89,389 votes (38.94%). In 1962 Dravid was sworn in as the Minister of Labour, Agriculture, Housing and Chambal Project in the Madhya Pradesh state cabinet.

In the wake of Verma's loss in the 1962 election, tensions between Verma on one hand and Dravid and Tiwari soared. By mid-1962 conflict broke out between Verma and Dravid factions of INTUC in Indore. The conflict escalated in 1963 as Dravid introduced an amendment to the 1959 Industrial Relations and Trade Unions Amendment Bill, which allowed workers to by-pass the officially recognised unions. Reportedly the Verma-led IMMS had not provided support to workers belonging to the Dravid faction.

Tensions increased in the latter part of 1963, with violent clashes taking place. Police was stationed at the local INTUC headquarters. Verma was detained under the Defence of India Rules. As conflict between Verma and Dravid unfolded in Indore, the national INTUC leadership was divided over which local faction to support. In the end the local INTUC branch was dissolved.

== Later years ==
Dravid resigned from his ministerial post in February 1964, having been asked to do so in order to rebuild the INTUC organisation in Indore. He returned to Indore to try to reorganise the trade union movement there. But politically the Chief Minister Dwarka Prasad Mishra made Tiwari his protege in Indore INTUC, thus sidelining Dravid. This shift provoked a conflict between followers of Dravid and his former lieutenant Tiwari. The INTUC faction in Indore Congress politics fizzled out.

Dravid served as the president of INTUC 1965 to 1967. Ahead of the 1967 Madhya Pradesh Legislative Assembly election the INTUC faction in the Congress Party was divided into the Dravid, Tiwari and Verma factions. The Congress Party nominated Tiwari as the candidate for the labour constituency, against the wishes of Dravid. Dravid himself declined to contest the election, and his selected candidate Mathuralal Sharma did not get any ticket to stand as a Congress Party candidate.

Dravid held the post of the IMMS president, and was the vice president of the Indian National Textile Workers Federation. In 1971, Dravid became the founding president of the Indian National Rural Labour Federation. Ahead of the 1972 Madhya Pradesh Legislative Assembly election Dravid resigned from his post as Madhya Pradesh INTUC president in protest of the move by the Congress Party to allot six seats to the Communist Party of India, albeit Dravid's resignation was later withdrawn. Dravid died in 1994, aged 80 or 81.
