= Christopher Masterman =

British civil servant and bureaucrat

Sir Christopher Masterman CSI CIE

Chief Secretary to the Government of the Madras Presidency
- In office 1943–1947
- Premier: Tanguturi Prakasam, O. P. Ramaswamy Reddiyar
- Governor: Arthur Hope, 2nd Baron Rankeillour
- Preceded by: S. V. Ramamurthy

Personal details
- Born: Christopher Hughes Masterman; 7 October 1889 Langley, Buckinghamshire, England
- Died: 16 February 1982 (aged 92) Broadstone, Dorset, England
- Spouse: Hope Gladys Gearing
- Education: Winchester College, Trinity College, Oxford

Sir Christopher Hughes Masterman CSI CIE (7 October 1889 – 16 February 1982) was a British civil servant and bureaucrat who served as Chief Secretary of the Madras Presidency from 1943 to 1947.

== Early life and education ==
Born on 7 October 1889 to Captain John Masterman of the Royal Navy, Masterman was educated at Winchester College and Trinity College, Oxford. Masterman married Hope Gladys Gearing in Madras in 1921. They had two sons, John and David.

== Career ==
Masterman joined the Indian Civil Service in 1913 and served as Assistant Collector and Magistrate in the Madras Presidency. From 1917 to 1919, he was called for military service during the First World War and from 1924 to 1932, he was served as Collector of Salt Revenue. Apart from serving as District Collector of Madras (1932–35) and Vizagapatam (1939–42), Masterman was also Secretary of the Education and Public Health departments from 1936 to 1939. From 1943 to 1947, Masterman served as Chief Secretary of Madras. In 1947–48, Masterman served as the United Kingdom's Deputy High Commissioner to India. Masterman retired from the Indian Civil Service upon India's independence in 1947.

== Honours ==
Masterman was made a Companion of the Order of the Indian Empire in the 1939 Birthday Honours, Companion of the Order of the Star of India in the 1944 New Year Honours, and knighted in 1947.
