= Lok Bhavan, Puri =

2nd Residence of the Governor of Odisha

- ରାଜଭବନ, ପୁରୀ
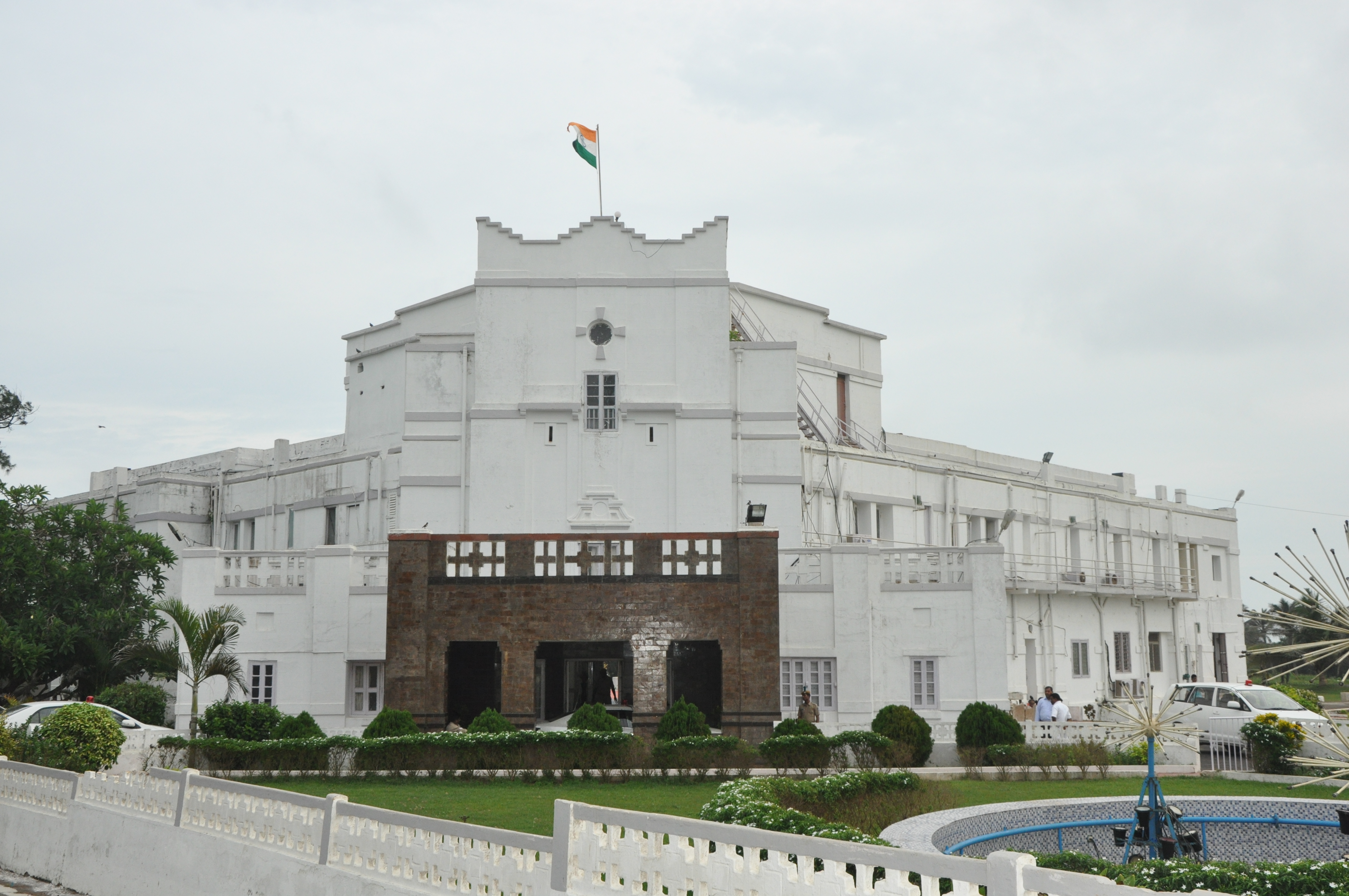
- Raj Bhavan building at Puri

- Location within Odisha

General information
- Coordinates: 19.7973°N 85.8293°E
- Current tenants: Kamphabhati Hari Babu
- Completed: 1914

References
- Website

Lok Bhavan formerly The Raj Bhavan of Puri in the Indian state of Odisha, is an official residence and summer resort of the Governor of Odisha Kamphabati Hari Babu. it was originally built as a summer residence for the erstwhile lieutenant-governor of the Province of Bihar and Odisha under the British Raj.

== Location ==
The building is located adjacent to the Bay of Bengal in Puri, about 60 miles (97 km) from Cuttack, the former capital of Odisha and 53 kilometres (33 mi) from the current capital, Bhubaneswar.

== History ==
Constructed in 1913–14, the original grounds covered an area of 30.226 acres (12.232 ha). The residence was subsequently used by British governors to escape the summer heat in Patna, which was then the capital of Bihar and Odisha. After Odisha became a separate province in 1936, the building became the residence of the state Governor of Odisha. However, because of the distance from the capital the residence shifted there in 1942. While the new residence in Cuttack was under construction, the Raj Bhavan at Puri underwent remodelling at a cost of Rs. 158,000 to "make it suitable and comfortable for the imperial dignity of His Majesty's representatives in India" with improvements including rewiring, updating of the plumbing system and the creation of a garden. The building remained in use as the summer residence for governors until 1973, then in 1983 part of the grounds were sold off for the construction of a hotel to boost state tourism.
