= List of governors of Odisha =

Governor of Odisha, eastern state of India

Governor of Odisha
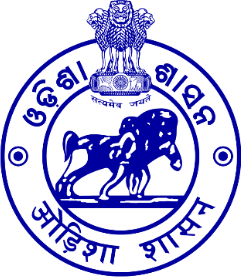
- Emblem of Odisha

- Flag of India

- Incumbent; Braj Mohan Ram since 18 October 2026
- Style: His Excellency
- Residence: Lok Bhavan, Bhubaneswar; Lok Bhavan, Puri
- Appointer: President of India
- Term length: At the pleasure of the president
- Inaugural holder: Sir John Austen Hubback
- Formation: 1 April 1936; 90 years ago
- Salary: ₹350,000 (US$3,600)/monthly; ₹4,200,000 (US$44,000)/annually
- Website: Lok Bhavan Odisha

The governor of Odisha is the constitutional head of the Indian state of Odisha. Governors are appointed by the President of India and exercise their constitutional powers at the state level. Although the governor is the formal head of the state, executive government is ordinarily conducted by the chief minister and the council of ministers, who are collectively responsible to the Odisha Legislative Assembly.

The incumbent is Braj Mohan Ram, who was appointed by President Droupadi Murmu on 12 October 2026 to succeed Kambhampati Hari Babu. His appointment became effective upon his assumption of office on 18 October 2026.

The office was established when Odisha became a separate province on 1 April 1936. Sir John Austen Hubback was its first governor. The governor's constitutional role includes appointing the chief minister, summoning and proroguing the state legislature, and giving assent to bills in accordance with the Constitution of India.

== List ==
Legend

- ^{†} Died in office
- ^{§} Transferred
- ^{‡} Resigned/removed

Color key

- indicates acting/additional charge

#	Portrait	Name (lifespan) Previous Office	Home state	Tenure in office			Appointer (President)
#	Portrait	Name (lifespan) Previous Office	Home state	From	To	Time in office	Appointer (President)
Orissa Province, British India (1936 - 1947)
1		Sir John Austen Hubback (1878–1968)	United Kingdom	1 April 1936	11 August 1938	2 years, 132 days	Freeman Thomas (Viceroy)
-		George Townsend Boag; CSI ICS (1884–1969) (Acting)	United Kingdom	11 August 1938	7 December 1938	118 days	Victor Hope (Viceroy)
2		Sir John Austen Hubback (1878–1968)	United Kingdom	8 December 1938	31 March 1941	2 years, 113 days (Total 4 years, 245 days)	Victor Hope (Viceroy)
3		Sir Hawthorne Lewis; KCIE ICS (1888–1970)	United Kingdom	1 April 1941	31 March 1946	4 years, 364 days	Victor Hope (Viceroy)
4		Chandulal Madhavlal Trivedi; CIE OBE ICS (1893–1980); Secretary in the War Department	Gujarat	1 April 1946	14 August 1947	1 year, 135 days	Archibald Wavell (Viceroy)
Orissa Province, Dominion of India (1947 - 1950)
1		Kailash Nath Katju (1887–1968); Minister in United Provinces Provisional Government	Central Provinces and Berar	15 August 1947	20 June 1948^{[§]} (Note: Transferred as the Governor of West Bengal)	310 days	Lord Mountbatten (Governor-General)
2		Asaf Ali (1888–1953); Ambassador of India to the United States	United Provinces	21 June 1948	25 January 1950	1 year, 218 days	Lord Mountbatten (Governor-General)
Orissa State, Republic of India (After 1950)
1		Asaf Ali (1888–1953); Ambassador of India to the United States	United Provinces	26 January 1950	5 May 1951	1 year, 99 days	Lord Mountbatten (Governor-General)
2		V. P. Menon; CSI CIE (1893–1965); Secretary in the Ministry of the States (Acting)	Madras State	6 May 1951	17 July 1951	72 days	Rajendra Prasad (Acting)
3		Asaf Ali (1888–1953); Ambassador of India to the United States	United Provinces	18 July 1951	6 June 1952	324 days (Total 3 years, 276 days)	Rajendra Prasad (Acting)
4		Justice (Retd); Saiyid Fazl Ali (1886–1959); Judge of the Supreme Court of India	Bihar	7 June 1952	9 February 1954	1 year, 247 days	Rajendra Prasad
5		P. S. Kumaraswamy Raja (1898–1957); Chief Minister of Madras State	Madras State	10 February 1954	11 September 1956	2 years, 214 days	Rajendra Prasad
6		Bhim Sen Sachar (1894–1978); Chief Minister of Punjab	Punjab	12 September 1956	31 July 1957^{[§]} (Note: Transferred as the Governor of Andhra Pradesh)	322 days	Rajendra Prasad
7		Yashwant Narayan Sukthankar; CIE ICS (Retd) (1897–1973); Cabinet Secretary of India	Bombay State	31 July 1957	15 September 1962	5 years, 46 days	Rajendra Prasad
8		Ajudhia Nath Khosla (1892–1984); MP from Rajya Sabha	Punjab	16 September 1962	5 August 1966	3 years, 323 days	Sarvepalli Radhakrishnan
9		Justice; Khaleel Ahmed (1907–his death); Chief Justice of Orissa High Court (Acting)	Bihar	5 August 1966	11 September 1966	37 days	Sarvepalli Radhakrishnan
10		Ajudhia Nath Khosla (1892–1984); MP from Rajya Sabha	Punjab	12 September 1966	30 January 1968	1 year, 140 days (Total 5 years, 98 days)	Sarvepalli Radhakrishnan
11		Shaukatullah Shah Ansari (1908–1972); MP from Bidar, Karnataka	Uttar Pradesh	31 January 1968	20 September 1971	3 years, 232 days	Zakir Husain
12		Sardar Jogendra Singh (1903–1979); MP from Bahraich, Uttar Pradesh (Acting)	Uttar Pradesh	20 September 1971	30 June 1972^{[§]} (Note: Transferred as the Governor of Rajasthan)	284 days	V. V. Giri
13		Justice; Gati Krushna Misra (d. 2009); Chief Justice of Orissa High Court (Acting)	Orissa	1 July 1972	8 November 1972	130 days	V. V. Giri
14		Basappa Danappa Jatti (1912–2002); Chief Minister of Mysore State	Karnataka	8 November 1972	20 August 1974^{[‡]} (Note: Resigned to become the Vice President of India)	1 year, 285 days	V. V. Giri
(13)		Justice; Gati Krushna Misra (d. 2009); Chief Justice of Orissa High Court (Acting)	Orissa	21 August 1974	25 October 1974	65 days (Total 195 days)	V. V. Giri
15		Akbar Ali Khan (1899–1994); Governor of Uttar Pradesh	Andhra Pradesh	25 October 1974	17 April 1976^{[‡]}	1 year, 175 days	Fakhruddin Ali Ahmed
16		Justice; Siba Narain Sankar (1915–his death); Chief Justice of Orissa High Court (Acting)	Delhi	17 April 1976	7 February 1977	296 days	Fakhruddin Ali Ahmed
17		Harcharan Singh Brar (1922–2009); MLA from Punjab	Punjab	7 February 1977	22 September 1977^{[§]} (Note: Transferred as the Governor of Haryana)	227 days	Fakhruddin Ali Ahmed
18		Bhagwat Dayal Sharma (1918–1993); Chief Minister of Haryana	Haryana	23 September 1977	30 April 1980^{[§]} (Note: Transferred as the Governor of Madhya Pradesh)	2 years, 220 days	Neelam Sanjiva Reddy
19		C. M. Poonacha (1910–1990); Governor of Madhya Pradesh	Karnataka	30 April 1980	30 September 1980	153 days	Neelam Sanjiva Reddy
20		Justice; Sukanta Kishore Ray (1918–2002); Chief Justice of Orissa High Court (Acting)	Orissa	1 October 1980	3 November 1980	33 days	Neelam Sanjiva Reddy
(19)		C. M. Poonacha (1910–1990); Governor of Madhya Pradesh	Karnataka	4 November 1980	24 June 1982	1 year, 232 days	Neelam Sanjiva Reddy
21		Justice; Ranganath Misra (1926–2012); Chief Justice of Orissa High Court (Acting)	Orissa	25 June 1982	31 August 1982	67 days	Neelam Sanjiva Reddy
(19)		C. M. Poonacha (1910–1990); Governor of Madhya Pradesh	Karnataka	1 September 1982	17 August 1983	350 days (Total 3 years, 5 days)	Zail Singh
22		Bishambhar Nath Pande (1906–1998); MP from Rajya Sabha, Uttar Pradesh	Uttar Pradesh	17 August 1983	20 November 1988^{[‡]}	5 years, 95 days	Zail Singh
23		Saiyid Nurul Hasan (1921–1993); Governor of West Bengal(Acting until 20 March 1989)	Uttar Pradesh	20 November 1988	6 February 1990^{[§]} (Note: Transferred as the Governor of West Bengal)	1 year, 78 days	Ramaswamy Venkataraman
24		Yagya Dutt Sharma (1922–1996); MP from Gurdaspur, Punjab	Punjab	7 February 1990	1 February 1993^{[‡]}	2 years, 360 days	Ramaswamy Venkataraman
(23)		Saiyid Nurul Hasan (1921–1993); Governor of West Bengal (Additional Charge)	Uttar Pradesh	1 February 1993	31 May 1993	119 days (Total 1 year, 197 days)	Shankar Dayal Sharma
25		B. Satya Narayan Reddy (1927–2012); Governor of Uttar Pradesh	Andhra Pradesh	1 June 1993	17 June 1995	2 years, 16 days	Shankar Dayal Sharma
26		Gopala Ramanujam (1915–2001); Governor of Goa	Tamil Nadu	18 June 1995	30 January 1997	1 year, 226 days	Shankar Dayal Sharma
27		K. V. Raghunatha Reddy (1924–2002); Governor of West Bengal (Additional Charge)	Andhra Pradesh	31 January 1997	12 February 1997	12 days	Shankar Dayal Sharma
(26)		Gopala Ramanujam (1915–2001); Governor of Goa	Tamil Nadu	13 February 1997	13 December 1997	303 days (Total 2 years, 164 days)	Shankar Dayal Sharma
(27)		K. V. Raghunatha Reddy (1924–2002); Governor of West Bengal (Additional Charge)	Andhra Pradesh	13 December 1997	27 April 1998	135 days	K. R. Narayanan
28		C. Rangarajan (born 1932); Governor of Andhra Pradesh (Additional Charge)	Tamil Nadu	27 April 1998	14 November 1999	1 year, 201 days	K. R. Narayanan
29		M. M. Rajendran; IAS (Retd) (1935–2023); Chief Secretary of Tamil Nadu	Tamil Nadu	15 November 1999	3 March 2003	3 years, 108 days	K. R. Narayanan
30		Surjit Singh Barnala (1925–2017); Chief Minister of Punjab	Punjab	4 March 2003	16 November 2003	257 days	K. R. Narayanan
(29)		M. M. Rajendran; IAS (Retd) (1935–2023); Chief Secretary of Tamil Nadu	Tamil Nadu	16 November 2003	17 November 2004	1 year, 1 day	K. R. Narayanan
31		Rameshwar Thakur (1925–2015); Union Minister of State in Finance	Jharkhand	18 November 2004	21 August 2007^{[§]} (Note: Transferred as the Governor of Karnataka)	2 years, 276 days	A. P. J. Abdul Kalam
32		Murlidhar Chandrakant Bhandare (1928–2024); MP From Rajya Sabha, Maharastra	Maharashtra	21 August 2007	20 March 2013	5 years, 211 days	Pratibha Patil
33		S. C. Jamir (born 1931); Chief Minister of Nagaland	Nagaland	21 March 2013	20 March 2018	4 years, 364 days	Pranab Mukherjee
34		Satya Pal Malik (1946–2025); Governor of Bihar (Additional Charge)	Uttar Pradesh	21 March 2018	28 May 2018	68 days	Ram Nath Kovind
35		Ganeshi Lal (born 1941); MLA from Haryana	Haryana	29 May 2018	30 October 2023	5 years, 154 days	Ram Nath Kovind
36		Raghubar Das (born 1955); Chief Minister of Jharkhand	Jharkhand	31 October 2023	3 January 2025^{[‡]}	1 year, 63 days	Droupadi Murmu
37		Kambhampati Hari Babu (born 1953); Governor of Mizoram	Andhra Pradesh	3 January 2025	18 October 2026	1 year, 288 days	Droupadi Murmu
38		Braj Mohan Ram MP from Palamu, Jharkhand (born 1958)	Jharkhand	18 October 2026	Incumbent	5 days	Droupadi Murmu

== Timeline ==
Timeline of Odisha governors

== See also ==
- Government of Odisha
- Chief Minister of Odisha
- Deputy Chief Ministers of Odisha
- Speaker of the Odisha Legislative Assembly
- Leader of the Opposition in the Odisha Legislative Assembly
- Odisha Legislative Assembly
- Elections in Odisha
- Politics of Odisha
- Governors of states of India
- List of governors of Bihar and Orissa Province
- List of current Indian governors
