= S. K. Chettur =

Indian civil servant

Sankara Krishna Chettur (1905–1972) was an Indian civil servant who served as Chief Secretary of Madras State from 1962 to 1964. He served the State government in a number of capacities and was also Secretary, Public Works Department, Home Secretary from 1958 to 1959, and Member, Board of Revenue. He was the nephew of Sir C. Sankaran Nair.
