= Michael John (trade unionist) =

Michael John (29 November 1903 – 3 August 1977) was an Indian trade unionist and politician from Tamil Nadu.

Born in the Vepery area of Chennai, John was educated at Doveton College, then worked in industry in Jamshedpur. In 1928, he led a strike at the Tinplate Company, working closely with Subhash Chandra Bose. He continued his trade union activities, and was imprisoned for them in 1941, and then in 1942 was imprisoned for participating in the Quit India Movement, remaining in prison until 1945. On release, he was elected to the Bihar Legislative Assembly.

John served as president of several unions in Bihar, Bengal and Orissa. From 1948, he served as president of the Bihar unit of the Indian National Trade Union Congress (INTUC). From 1952 to 1953, and again from 1960 to 1962, he served as overall president of INTUC. He was also president of the Indian National Metalworkers' Federation and the Indian National Mineworkers' Federation.

John served on the All India Congress Committee for many years, and he was active in the ICFTU Asia and Pacific Regional Organisation. From 1957 to 1962, he represented Bihar in the Rajya Sabha. He also helped Rajendra Prasad write his autobiography. In 1971, two bombs were thrown at John's car, but he was unharmed. He died in 1977, following a lengthy illness.

Trade union offices
Preceded by Abdul Bari	President of the Tata Workers' Union; 1947–1977	Succeeded by V. G. Gopal
Preceded by Khandubhai Kasanji Desai	President of the Indian National Trade Union Congress; 1952–1953	Succeeded by S. R. Vasavada
Preceded by Gopala Ramanujam	President of the Indian National Trade Union Congress; 1960–1962	Succeeded by Maitreyee Bose
Preceded by Union founded	President of the Indian National Mineworkers' Federation; 1952–c.1974	Succeeded by Kanti Mehta
Preceded by Union founded	President of the Indian National Metal Workers' Federation; 1959–1977	Succeeded by V. G. Gopal
