= Geoffrey Bracken =

Sir Geoffrey Bracken KCIE CSI

Chief Secretary to the Government of the Madras Presidency
- In office 1931–1935
- Premier: B. Munuswamy Naidu, Ramakrishna Ranga Rao of Bobbili
- Preceded by: C. W. E. Cotton
- Succeeded by: C. F. Brackenbury

Personal details
- Born: 11 April 1879 Leeds, United Kingdom
- Died: June 11, 1951 (aged 72) Leeds, United Kingdom
- Education: Malvern College, Oriel College, Oxford

Sir Geoffrey Thomas Hirst Bracken KCIE CSI (1879-1951) was a civil servant and bureaucrat of the Indian civil service who served as Chief Secretary of Madras Presidency from 1931 to 1935 and Revenue member of the Governor's Executive Council from 1935 to 1938.

== Early life ==
Bracken was born on 11 April 1879 at Leeds, United Kingdom, to Thomas H. Bracken. He studied at Malvern College and Oriel College, Oxford and qualified for the Indian civil service in 1902.

== Career ==
Bracken was initially posted as Assistant Collector of Tinnevely. He then served as Assistant Collector in Trichinopoly, Sattur, Tuticorin, Tanjore and Negapatam and Deputy Collector in Chingleput, Madras and Cocanada before being promoted District Collector and serving in Ganjam, East Godavari and Vizagapatam. In 1931, he was appointed Chief Secretary to the Government of Madras. On 19 March 1935, Bracken was made Finance Member in the executive council of the Governor of Madras. Bracken retired from the Indian Civil Service in 1938.

== Honours ==
Bracken was made a Companion of the Order of the Indian Empire in 1930, a Companion of the Order of the Star of India in 1934, and a Knight Commander of the Order of the Indian Empire in 1936.

== Death ==
Bracken died on 11 June 1951 in the United Kingdom.
