= C. F. Brackenbury =

English bureaucrat

Sir Cecil Fabian Brackenbury KCIE CSI

Chief Secretary to the Government of the Madras Presidency
- In office 1935–1938
- Premier: Ramakrishna Ranga Rao of Bobbili, P. T. Rajan, Kurma Venkata Reddy Naidu, C. Rajagopalachari
- Governor: John Erskine, Lord Erskine
- Preceded by: G. T. H. Bracken
- Succeeded by: G. T. Boag

Personal details
- Born: 13 March 1881 Ely, United Kingdom
- Died: September 29, 1958 (aged 77) Ely, United Kingdom
- Spouse: Ethel Selina Bolleau
- Education: Selwyn College, Cambridge

Sir Cecil Fabian Brackenbury KCIE CSI (13 March 1881 – 29 September 1958) was a civil servant and bureaucrat who served as Chief Secretary of the Madras Presidency from 1935 to 1939. Brackenbury was Chief Secretary when the first elections were held in the Madras Presidency as per the Government of India Act, 1935 and had a warm and friendly relationship with C. Rajagopalachari, the Premier of Madras Presidency from 1937 to 1939.

== Career ==
Brackenbury joined the Indian Civil Service on 1 November 1905 and served as Assistant Collector and Magistrate in Chittoor, Ootacamund and Chingleput. From 1920 to 1924, Brackenbury served as Political Agent in Sandur State. As Settlement Officer in Cuddapah, Brackenbury was instrumental in preparing the Cuddapah District Gazetteer. Later, he was promoted Deputy Collector and then, Collector and he served as District Collector of Nilgiris District from 17 April 1926 to 20 March 1928. and Chittoor. In the 1930s, Brackenbury was appointed Commissioner of Labour in the Madras Presidency and in 1935, he succeeded G. T. H. Bracken as Chief Secretary to the Madras government.

== Chief Secretary ==
Brackenbury's term as Chief Secretary of Madras was a momentous period in Indian history. The Government of India Act was passed in 1935 and as per the provisions of the act the franchise which had hitherto been restricted only to landlords and notables was enlarged to include much of India's population making the 1937 elections, the first democratically held elections in India's history. In the Madras Presidency, the Indian National Congress was elected to power and Indian independence activist C. Rajagopalachari became the Premier.

Brackenbury soon became a favourite of Rajagopalachari and the working of the government was smooth and unhindered. Upon Rajagopalachari taking charge as Premier, he gifted khadi cloth to Brackenbury. Brackenbury warmly accepted the gift and made a suit out of it. The Governor, Lord Erskine reported to the Viceroy, Lord Linlithgow that Rajagopalachari had 'struck up a great friendship with the Chief Secretary, which is certainly reciprocated.'

When Brackenbury retired as Chief Secretary in 1938, Rajagopalachari tried to recommend Brackenbury's name for the post of Governor of Orissa, but the Viceroy discouraged him.

== Death ==
Brackenbury's ashes are buried in Cambridge city Crematorium along with his wife, Ethel.
