= G. T. Boag =

British Indian civil servant, statistician and administrator

Sir George Townsend Boag KCIE CSI

Diwan of Cochin
- In office 1943–1944
- Preceded by: A. F. W. Dickinson
- Succeeded by: C. P. Karunakara Menon

Chief Secretary to the Government of the Madras Presidency
- In office 1938–1939
- Premier: C. Rajagopalachari
- Governor: John Erskine, Lord Erskine
- Preceded by: C. F. Brackenbury
- Succeeded by: S. V. Ramamurthy

Governor of Odisha (acting)
- In office 11 August 1938 – 8 December 1938
- Governor General: Victor Hope, 2nd Marquess of Linlithgow
- Premier: Bishwanath Das
- Preceded by: John Austen Hubback
- Succeeded by: John Austen Hubback

Chief Secretary of Madras Presidency
- In office 1938–1939
- Premier: C. Rajagopalachari
- Preceded by: C. F. Brackenbury
- Succeeded by: S. V. Ramamurthy

Municipal Commissioner of Madras
- In office 1923–1925

Personal details
- Born: 1884
- Died: 1969 (age 85) United Kingdom

Sir George Townsend Boag KCIE CSI (1884–1969) was a British Indian civil servant, statistician and administrator who served as the Acting Governor of Odisha from 11 August 1938 to 8 December 1938.

== Early life ==
George Townsend Boag was born on 12 November 1884 to Rev. George Boag, the Vicar of Winster in Westmorland. He gained admission to Westminster School on 21 January 1897 and studied at the school from 1897 to 1903. He was a Mure Scholar for the year 1901. He obtained his baccalaureate and master's degrees from the University of Cambridge. In 1907, he passed the Indian Civil Service examinations and was allotted to the Madras Presidency.

== In India ==
=== Madras Presidency ===
Boag arrived in India in 1908 and served as a special settlement officer from 1912 to 1918. He was appointed to the Indian Nutrition Board and served as the Collector of Transtuffs from 1912 to 1918. From 1920 to 1922, Boag served as Superintendent of Census Operations for the Presidency succeeding J. C. Molony. Boag served as the Municipal Commissioner for Madras from 1923 to 1925. He was the Chief Secretary of Madras Presidency from 1925 to 1928 and 1934 to 1938. Boag served as the District Collector of West Godavari in 1930 before being appointed the Superintendent of the Madras Presidency Archives succeeding A. V. Venkatarama Ayyar on 19 August 1930. Boag served as a member of the Indian Tariff Board from 1931 to 1933.

He served as the District Grand Master of District Grand Lodge of Madras (1891-1900, 1933-1945).

=== Odisha ===
On 11 August 1938 the Governor of Odisha, Sir John Austen Hubback proceeded on a leave. Boag was appointed Acting Governor of Odisha in his stead and served from 11 August 1938 to 8 December 1938. As the Acting Governor of Odisha, he inaugurated the opening session of the Odisha Legislative Assembly on 29 August 1938.

On 12 September 1938 severe agitations broke out in the princely state of Dhenkanal demanding the abolition of stringent taxes. The situation turned violent as the agitations intensified. The Eastern States Agency, a federation of princely states of which Dhenkanal formed a part, resorted to police action. Large scale arrests were carried out and there was police firing in some areas. As a result of the disturbances in the neighbouring Dhenkanal, a large number of refugees poured into Odisha. Boag kept the Viceroy of India regularly updated with the events at Dhenkanal. The influx of refugees reached such alarming proportions that refugee camps had to be established along the border towns.

On 8 December 1938 Sir John Austen Hubback returned from leave and resumed his duties as Governor of Odisha. Boag was transferred back to Madras Presidency where he served as a member of the Special Advisory Council during Governor's rule and was given charge of the public, finance and revenue departments. He served in the Council from 1939 to 1943. On 1943, he was appointed Diwan of Cochin and served from 1943 to 1944.

== Honours ==
George Townsend Boag was made a Companion of the Indian Empire in 1928 and a Companion of the Star of India in 1936. He was made a Knight Commander of the Order of the Indian Empire in 1941.

== Boag's residence ==
Boag's official residence in Madras city was located at T. Nagar. The street in which it was situated was named Boag Road in his honour. The house was later purchased by Kurma Venkata Reddy Naidu. In 1959, it was bought by Tamil film actor Sivaji Ganesan who renamed it Annai Illam. Today, the house is owned by the actor's family who continue to reside here.

== Works ==
- George Townsend Boag (1933). The Madras Presidency, 1881-1931. Government Press.

== Notes ==
Preceded by	Collector of Transtuffs (Indian Nutrition Board); 1912-1918	Succeeded by
Preceded by J. C. Molony	Superintendent of Census Operations for the Madras Presidency; 1921-22	Succeeded by M. W. M. Yeats
Preceded by	Municipal Commissioner of Madras city 1923-1925	Succeeded by
Preceded by	Chief Secretary of Madras Presidency; 1925-1928	Succeeded by A. Y. G. Campbell
Preceded by John Austen Hubback	Governor of Odisha (Acting); 11 August 1938 – 8 December 1938	Succeeded by John Austen Hubback
Preceded by	Member of Governor of Madras Advisory Council; 1939-1943	Succeeded by
Preceded by A. F. W. Dickinson	Diwan of Cochin; 1943-1944	Succeeded by C. P. Karunakara Menon
