= S. V. Ramamurthy =

Sir Sonti Venkata Ramamurthy KCIE CSI
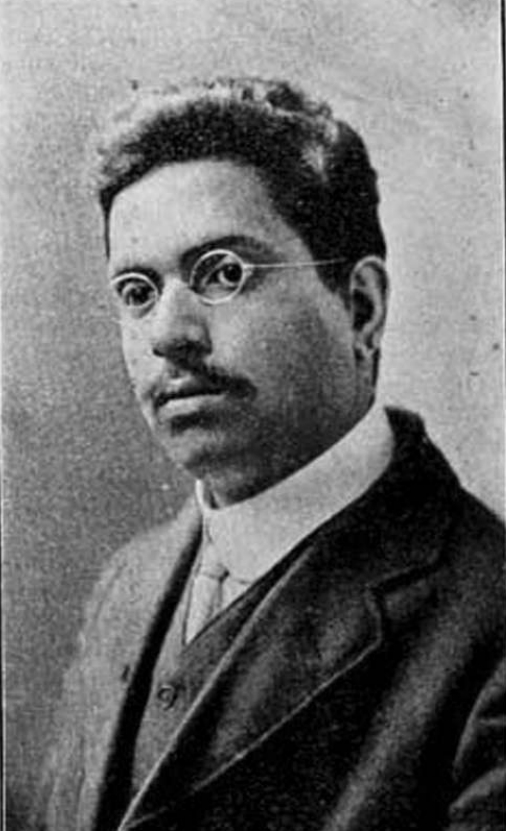

Chief Secretary to the Government of Madras Presidency
- In office 1939–1943
- Premier: None (Governor's rule)
- Governor: Arthur Hope, 2nd Baron Rankeillour
- Preceded by: G. T. Boag
- Succeeded by: C. H. Masterman

Personal details
- Born: 1 August 1888 Vizagapatam
- Died: January 19, 1964 (aged 75) United Kingdom
- Education: London Mission High School, Vizagapatam, University of Madras, Trinity College, Cambridge

Sir Sonti Venkata Ramamurthy KCIE (1 August 1888 - 19 January 1964) was an Indian civil servant who served as Chief Secretary to the Government of Madras Presidency from 1939 to 1943 and as advisor to the Madras government from 1941 to 1945. He was the first Indian to be appointed Chief Secretary of Madras. Ramamurthy also acted as the Governor of Bombay Presidency from 19 May 1947 to 30 May 1947.

== Early life and education ==
Born in Vizagapatam on 1 August 1888, Ramamurthy studied at the London Mission High School and after graduating from Madras University, did his masters' at the Trinity College, Cambridge. Ramamurthy passed the Indian Civil Service examinations in 1911 and was allocated to the Madras Presidency. During his stay in Cambridge, Ramamurthy gained a reputation for his mathematical abilities.

== Career ==
Ramamurthy joined the Indian Civil Service in November 1911 and served his entire career in the Madras Presidency, In 1923, he was appointed District Collector of Ramnad. In September 1927, he succeeded H. S. Shield as the District Collector of Tanjore district, the second native Indian to be appointed to the post. In 1928, he was appointed Secretary of the Development Department of Madras Presidency and served a short stint as the Director of Agriculture before being appointed District Collector of Salem. In 1937, Ramamurthy was removed as District Collector of Salem at the insistence of the Premier, C. Rajagopalachari and replaced with an Englishman, A. F. W. Dixon, who achieved remarkable success in imposing prohibition in Salem district. Ramamurthy responded when, appointed to head a commission after the Governor had dismissed Rajaji's government, he recommended the abolition of prohibition throughout the province.

In 1939, Ramamurthy was appointed Chief Secretary to the Madras government, the first Indian to occupy the post. He served till 1941 during the time when the Second World War broke out and introduced food rationing in the province. He retired as advisor to the Madras government in 1946.

== Later life ==
Following his retirement, Ramamurthy accepted an invitation to act as the Governor of Bombay for a few days. Later that year, he accepted an appointment as the Diwan of Udaipur State. Ramamurthy served for a year and oversaw the state's accession to the Indian Union.
