= Gopala Ramanujam =

Indian politician

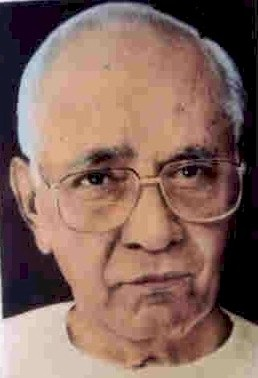

Governor of Goa
- In office 4 August 1994 – 15 June 1995
- Preceded by: B. Rachaiah
- Succeeded by: Romesh Bhandari

Governor of Odisha
- In office 18 June 1995 – 30 January 1997
- Preceded by: B. Satya Narayan Reddy
- Succeeded by: K. V. Raghunatha Reddy

Governor of Odisha
- In office 13 February 1997 – 13 December 1997
- Preceded by: K. V. Raghunatha Reddy
- Succeeded by: K. V. Raghunatha Reddy

President Indian National Trade Union Congress
- In office 1958–1960
- In office 1985 – 3 August 1994
- General Secretary: Kanti Mehta
- Treasurer: Gopeshwar Das
- Preceded by: Bindeshwari Dubey
- Succeeded by: G. Sanjeeva Reddy

Personal details
- Born: 28 May 1915 Ramanathapuram, Madras Presidency, British India
- Died: 26 June 2001 (aged 86)
- Occupation: Politician

Gopala Ramanujam (1915–2001) was an Indian politician and co-founder of the Indian National Trade Union Congress. He was born on 28 May 1915 at Edircottal village, Ramanathapuram District in Tamil Nadu, India. He was a recipient of the third highest Indian civilian award of the Padma Bhushan.

== Trade union ==
He was trained in trade union work during 1945 to 1947 at the Hindusthan Mazdoor Sevak Sangh and Majur Mahajan, Ahmedabad, an institution founded by Mahatma Gandhi. He was the president of the INTUC from 1958 to 1960, and general secretary from 1964 till 1984. In 1985, he was again elected president, and held the post until 3 August 1994.

To honour his commitment to trade unionism, the Chennai-based National Centre for Industrial Harmony conducts the annual G. Ramanujam Memorial Lecture. There is also a permanent chair in his name at The Tamil Nadu Institute of Labour Studies.

== Governor ==
He was Governor of Goa from 4 August 1994, to 15 June 1995, before being sworn in as Governor of Odisha on 18 June 1995, and stepped down on 30 January 1997. He did another stint from 13 February 1997, to 13 December 1997.

He held additional charge of Governor of Andhra Pradesh, from 22 August to 23 November 1997, when incumbent Krishan Kant was elected vice-president.

== See also ==
- List of governors of Odisha
- List of governors of Goa

| Preceded by B. Satya Narayan Reddy (first term); K.V. Raghunatha Reddy (second term) | Governor of Odisha; 18 Jun 1995 – 30 Jan 1997 (first term); 13 February 1997 – 13 Dec 1997 (second term) | Succeeded by K.V. Raghunatha Reddy (first term); K.V. Raghunatha Reddy (second term) |
