= Khusrupur =

- town
- Location in Bihar, India
- Coordinates: 25.4667°N 85.3833°E
- Country: India
- State: Bihar
- District: Patna

Population (2001)
  - Total: 12,185

Languages
  - Official: Magadhi, Hindi
- Time zone: UTC+5:30 (IST)
- PIN: 803202
- Website: patna.nic.in

Khusrupur is a town and a notified area in Patna district of Bihar state, India. It is situated at the bank of river the Ganges. It is located on NH-30, 34 kilometers east of Patna. By rail, it is 31 kilometers east of Patna.

== Tourism ==
The ancient and historical Shiv temple is situated in Baikatpur village adjacent to the capital Patna, which is also known as Shri Gaurishankar Baikunthdham. The glory of this ancient temple is associated with many eras of the past. Situated just 3 kilometers away from the town by road. Its design is a combination of both Hindu and Muslim architectural styles. This temple looks like a temple from front and like a mosque from behind. It is a big and very old temple of Lord Shiva where Shiv and Shiva (Parvati) both are jointly worshiped in one Shivling. According to local people, this temple exist from Mahabharat times and the king Jarasandh (the ruler of Magadh) used to worship this Shivling.

Man Singh ordered the restoration of the temple the before he started his journey and achieved victory in Bengal.

Formerly the temple was situated on the southern bank of the Ganges. Now, the Ganges has receded about 5 km north. A saint always remained on a boat in the water of the Ganges. Management has constructed a large cement boat and a temple in his memory on the Samadhi of the saint. New tourist, visitors, pilgrims devotees and worshipers are introduced to this as temple of Naiea baba.' Temple premises have adequate arrangement for rituals like marriage ceremony, mundan and other local festivities.

On 1 June 2009, Khusrupur railway station witnessed burning of two trains by a mob protesting the withdrawal of stoppage of trains there.

== Places near Khusrupur ==
Places near Khusrupur include Baikatpur (3 km), Haibatpur (3 km), Bahadurpur (5 km), Jagmal Bigha (6 km), Momin Pur (6 km), Kala Diara (7 km) Lodipur (2 km). Surrounded by Raghopur Block towards North, Nagar Nausa Block towards South, Bakhtiarpur Block towards East, Daniyawan Block towards west, Khusrupur serves as the market hub for places nearby.

== Demographics ==
As of 2001 India census, Khusrupur had a population of 12,185. Males constitute 53% of the population and females 47%. Khusrupur has an average literacy rate of 54%, lower than the national average of 59.5%: male literacy is 62%, and female literacy is 45%. In Khusrupur, 17% of the population is under 6 years of age.
