= G. Sanjeeva Reddy =

Indian politician and artist

Gongalla Sanjeeva Reddy
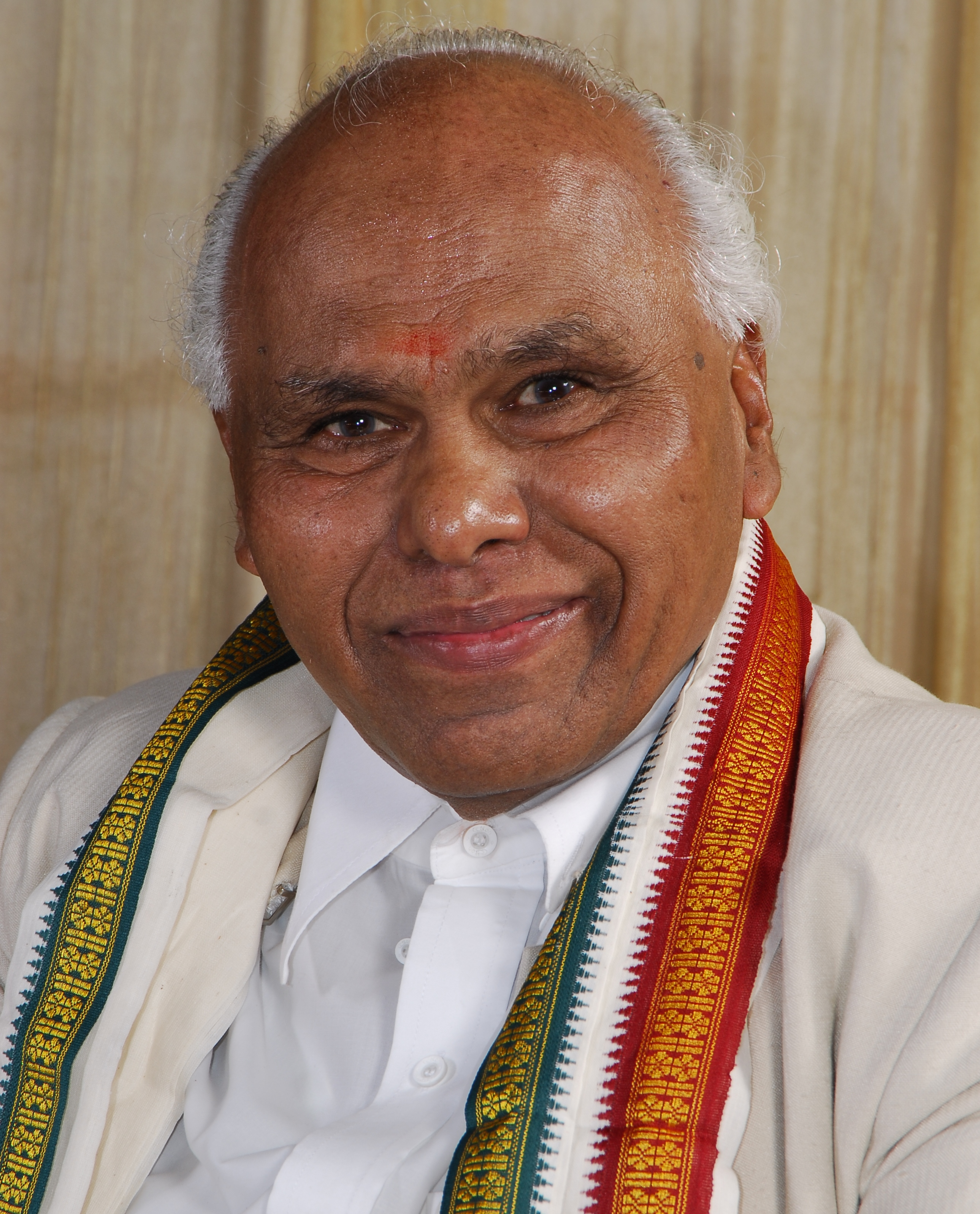

President of the Indian National Trade Union Congress
- Incumbent
- Assumed office 3 August 1994
- Preceded by: Gopala Ramanujam

Member of Parliament, Rajya Sabha
- In office April 2006 – April 2012

Member of the Congress Working Committee
- Incumbent
- Assumed office December 2003

Vice President of the International Trade Union Confederation
- Incumbent
- Assumed office 25 June 2010

President of the ITUC-Asia Pacific
- In office Feb 2011 – Nov 2015
- Preceded by: G Rajasekaran
- Succeeded by: Felix Anthony

Personal details
- Born: Hyderabad, Telangana, India
- Party: Indian National Congress
- Profession: Trade unionist Politician

Gongalla Sanjeeva Reddy is a politician and artist from Indian National Congress party and an ex-Member of the Parliament of India who represented Andhra Pradesh in the Rajya Sabha, the upper house of the Indian Parliament.

== Early life ==
Gongalla Sanjeeva Reddy was born in Hyderabad to Narasamma and Achi Reddy. He received an honorary doctorate by Mahatma Gandhi Kashi Vidyapith, Varanasi (peacock terms).

== Early career ==
Reddy joined the trade union movement as a young worker in 1948 and was elected general secretary of INTUC Hyderabad Branch in 1950. He was soon elevated as its president in 1954 which position he continues till today. In addition, he is also the president of premier national trade unions in electricity, tunnel, coal, health, medical, engineering, chemical, municipal, Cement workers, Steel workers, Cigarette and tobacco workers. Reddy was first elected to post of president, INTUC on 3 August 1994 from Shri G. Ramanujam when he was appointed Governor of Orissa in 1994 and since then he has been unanimously elected continuously. Reddy's popularity in international forum is well known. He was elected vice-president of international Confederation in March 1988 at Melbourne and he has since been re-elected continuously by the World Congress, the last one held at Copenhagen, Denmark, in 2018. He has attended ILO Conference in Geneva many times.

== Positions held ==
- 1962-1967 Member, Andhra Pradesh Legislative Assembly
- 1967-1972 Member, Andhra Pradesh Legislative Assembly
- 1968-1971 Cabinet Minister for Labour, Employment, Training and Rehabilitation, Government of Andhra Pradesh.
- April 2006 Elected to Rajya Sabha.
- June 2006-May 2009 and Aug. 2009 onwards Member, Parliamentary Committee on Industry
- Sept. 2006 onwards Member, Parliamentary Committee on Papers Laid on the Table
- Dec. 2006-May 2009 Member, National Board for Micro, Small and Medium Enterprises
- Aug. 2007-May 2009 Member, Sub-Committee-III for Heavy Industries and Public Enterprises of the Parliamentary Committee on Industry
- Aug. 2009-Aug. 2010 Member, Parliamentary Committee on Labour
- Aug. 2009 onwards Member, Consultative Committee for the Ministry of Heavy Industries and Public Enterprises
- September 2010 onwards Member, Parliamentary Committee on Industry
- Aug. 1994 onwards President Indian National Trade Union Congress (INTUC)
- September 2010 onwards director Indian Institute of Management(IIM) Rohtak
- Jan. 2011 onwards Vice president, International Trade Union Confederation – Belgium
- Feb. 2011-Nov. 2015 President International Trade Union Confederation – Asia Pacific Region – Singapore

He was the chairman of AICC Labour Cell till it was abolished and INTUC was included in AICC's frontal organisations and he is special Invitee of Congress Working Committee. He was also the member of National Integration Council. In addition, he is associated as member on various committees and boards constituted by the Central Government. He has been the chairperson of Regional Board for Workers Education, Hyderabad, and member of 2nd National Commission on Labour. He has also been the director A.P. Road Transport Corporation, Hindustan Salts Ltd., Union Bank of India, Hyderabad Allwyn Limited and vice president of A.P. Productivity Council.

== Representing India ==
Reddy represented India in conferences, summits, forums, meetings held at U.S., Russia, China, Nepal, Denmark, Philippines, United Kingdom, South Korea, Indonesia, France, Belgium, Australia, Singapore, Switzerland, Italy, Japan, Hong Kong, Sri Lanka, Canada, Pakistan, Austria, Thailand etc. in connection with trade union issues. He attended ILO (ILC) conferences in Geneva and Bangkok many times. He was a member of Indian delegation for World Summit for Social Development at Copenhagen. He attended World Economic Forum held at New York City in 2002.
