= Indian National Trade Union Congress =

Trade union in India

Indian National Trade Union Congress (INTUC)
- Founded: 3 May 1947 (79 years ago)
- Headquarters: 4, Bhai Veer Singh Marg, New Delhi
- Location: India
- Members: 30+ million
- Key people: G. Sanjeeva Reddy (President)
- Affiliations: ITUC
- Website: www.intuc.net

The Indian National Trade Union Congress (INTUC) is a national trade union centre in India. Founded on 3 May 1947, it is affiliated with the International Trade Union Confederation. The INTUC claims a membership of over 30 million.

== Early years ==
The INTUC was founded on 3 May 1947, three months before India attained independence.

Acharya JB Kripalani, who was then President of the Indian National Congress inaugurated the Founding conference of INTUC. Among the distinguished leaders who attended the opening session were Pandit Jawaharlal Nehru, Shankarrao Deo, Jagjivan Ram, B. G. Kher, OP Mehtab, Aruna Asaf Ali, Ram Manohar Lohia, Ashoka Mehta, Ramchandra Sakharam Ruikar, Maniben Patel and other prominent trade unionists.

== INTUC Congress relationship ==
Since inception, INTUC has been maintaining very close relationship with All India Congress Committee (AICC). On several occasions there have been discussions over the relationship between INTUC and AICC and the need for having continuous dialogue between the two organisations on issues of mutual interest. In order to have regular interaction between the INTUC & AICC a five-member committee was appointed by the AICC in 1967 with Gulzarilal Nanda as convener. Similarly during 2002, an advisory committee was formed under the chairmanship of Pranab Mukherjee. Three general secretaries represented AICC in the committee. On behalf of INTUC, G. Sanjeeva Reddy president, then general secretary and two vice-presidents represented. Later G. Sanjeeva Reddy was included in the CWC.

== Affiliates ==
The INTUC's current affiliates are:

- All India National Life Insurance Employees' Federation
- Central Government Employees' Confederation
- Federation of National Postal Organisations
- Indian National Bank Employees' Federations
- Indian National Bank Officers' Congress
- Indian National Building Construction, Forest & Woodworkers' Federation
- Indian National Cement Workers' Federation
- Indian National Chemical Workers' Federation
- Indian National Defence Workers' Federation
- Indian National Electricity Workers' Federation
- Indian National Food and Drink Workers' Federation
- Indian National Jute Workers' Federation
- Indian National Metal Workers' Federation
- Indian National Mineworkers' Federation
- Indian National Municipal and Local Bodies Workers' Federation
- Indian National Paper Mill Workers' Federation
- Indian National Plantation Workers' Federation
- Indian National Port and Dock Workers' Federation
- Indian National Rural Labour Federation
- Indian National Salaried Employees' and Professional Workers' Federation
- Indian National Sugar Mill Workers' Federation
- Indian National Textile Workers' Federation
- Indian National Transport Workers' Federation
- National Federation of Indian Railwaymen
- National Federation of Petroleum Workers
- National Federation of Telecommunication Organisations
- Orissa Colliery Mazdoor Sangha

Coal India LTD

== Leadership ==
=== Presidents ===
#	Name	Took office	Left office
1	Dr. Suresh Chandra Banerjee	May 1947	October 1947
2	Harihar Nath Shastri	October 1947	May 1949
3	Khandubhai Kasanji Desai	May 1949	October 1952
4	Michael John	December 1952	December 1953
5	S. R. Vasavada	December 1953	January 1955
6	G. D. Ambekar	January 1955	May 1956
7	S. R. Vasavada	May 1956	January 1958
8	Gopala Ramanujam	January 1958	April 1960
9	Michael John	April 1960	June 1962
10	Dr. Mrs. Maitreyee Bose	June 1962	May 1963
11	Kashinath Pandey	May 1963	December 1964
12	Dr. G. S. Melkote	December 1964	December 1965
13	Vyanktesh Vishnu Dravid	December 1965	May 1968
14	Abid Ali Jaferbhai	May 1968	May 1969
15	Gulzarilal Nanda	May 1969	February 1970
16	Dr. Mrs. Maitreyee Bose	February 1970	November 1971
17	Bijoy Chandra Bhagavati	November 1971	October 1978
18	Anant Prasad Sharma	October 1978	November 1980
19	N. K. Bhatt	November 1980	May 1984
20	Pt. Bindeshwari Dubey	May 1984	March 1985
21	Gopala Ramanujam	March 1985	3 August 1994
22	G. Sanjeeva Reddy	3 August 1994	Incumbent

== See also ==
- Trade unions in India
- Indian National Congress

=== References ===
Nationwide General Strike on July 9: Trade Unions Unite to Protest Anti-Labour Policies
