= 1930 in India =

- Centuries: 18th; 19th; 20th; 21st
- Decades: 1910s; 1920s; 1930s; 1940s; 1950s
- See also: List of years in India; Timeline of Indian history

Events in the year 1930 in India.

== Incumbents ==
- Emperor of India – George V
- Viceroy of India – The Lord Irwin

== Events ==
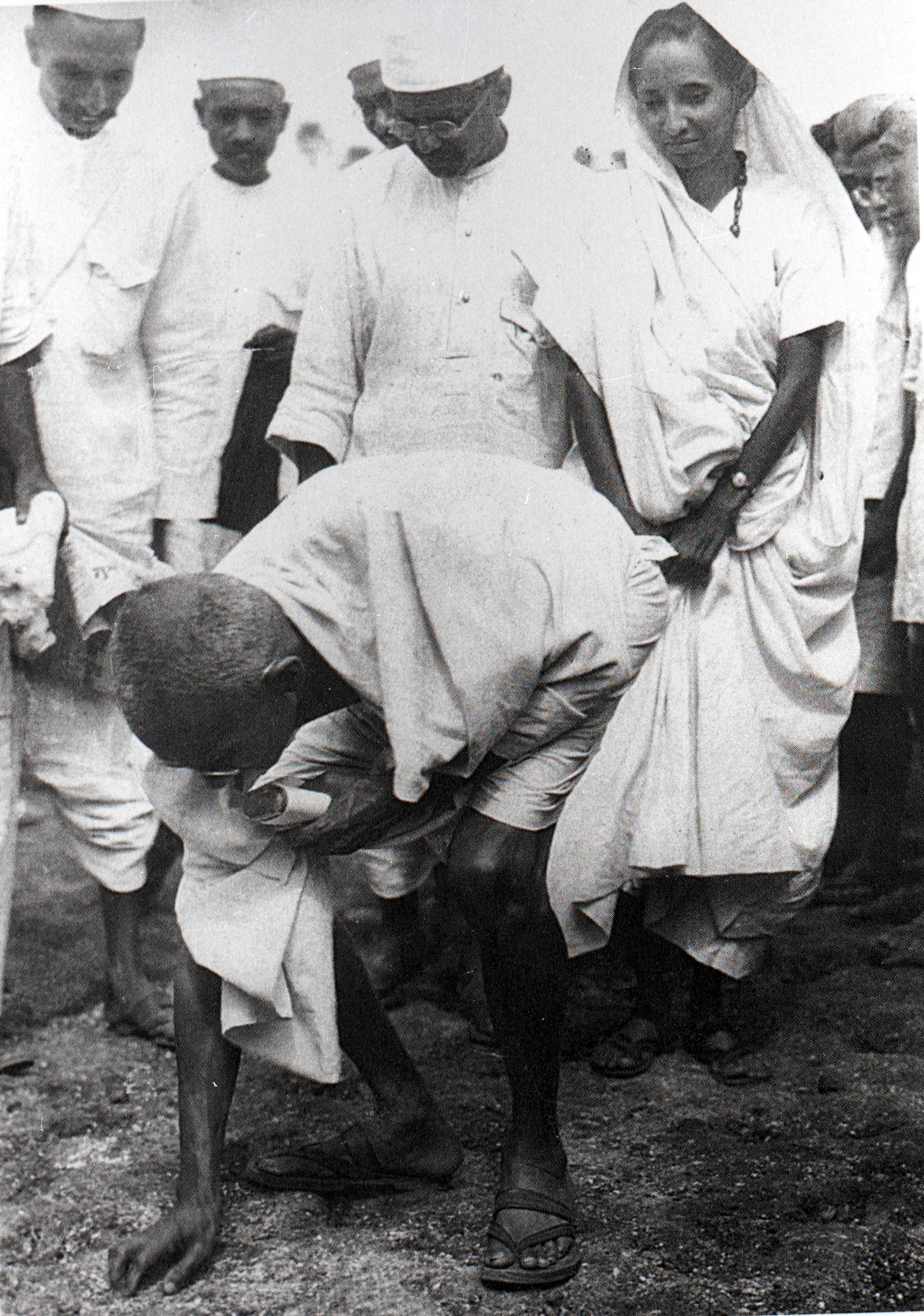
Gandhi at Dandi, 6 April 1930, at the end of the Salt March

- National income - ₹31,435 million
- 26 January – The Indian National Congress declares January 26 as Independence Day, or the day for Poorna Swaraj (Complete Independence).
- 28 February - Sir C V Raman Received Nobel Prize in Physics.
- 2 March – Mohandas Gandhi informs British viceroy of India that civil disobedience would begin nine days later.
- 12 March – Mohandas Gandhi sets off to a 200-mile protest march towards the sea with 78 followers to protest the British monopoly on salt – more will join them during the Salt March that ends on 5 April.
- 6 April – In an act of civil disobedience, Mahatma Gandhi breaks British law after marching to the sea and taking salt.
- 18 April – Chittagong armoury raid also known as Chittagong uprising.
- 30 April – The Vedaranyam Salt satyagraha led by Rajaji and Sardar Vedarathinam Pillai culminates in South India
- 4–5 May – Mohandas Gandhi is arrested again.
- October – First Round Table Conference opens in London.
- 28 December – Mohandas Gandhi leaves for Britain for negotiations

== Law ==
- Publication of the report of the Simon Commission.
- Sale of Goods Act
- Hindu Gains of Learning Act

== Births ==
- 3 June – George Fernandes, politician (died 2019)
- 6 June – Sunil Dutt, actor, producer, director and politician (died 2005).
- 7 June – Chitrananda Abeysekera, Sri Lankan veteran broadcaster (died 1992)
- 10 June – Satya Priya Mahathero, Bangladeshi Buddhist pundit, religious leader and social worker (died 2019)
- 17 June – Anup Kumar, actor (died 1998).
- 26 June – Mehli Irani, cricketer (died 2021)
- 30 June – Nabeesa Ummal, politician (died 2023)
- 9 July – Kailasam Balachander, Producer, Director, Actor (died 2014).
- 11 July – Shafiqur Rahman Barq, politician
- 10 August – R. Nagaswamy, historian and archaeologist (died 2022).
- 5 November – Arjun Singh, politician and Minister (died 2011).
- 15 November – Geeta Bali, actress (died 1965).
- 18 November – Jai Narain Prasad Nishad, politician (died 2018)
- 23 November – Geeta Dutt, playback singer (died 1972).
- 13 December – Jacob Thoomkuzhy, Syro-Malabar hierarch (died 2025).

=== Full date unknown ===
- Bahadoor, actor (died 2000).

== Deaths ==
- 10 February – Akshay Kumar Maitreya, historian (born 1861)
- 12 May Kaikhusrau Jahan, Begum of Bhopal (born 1858)
- 16 September – Martial Paillot, French Roman Catholic missionary, history professor and parish priest
- 28 September – T K Madhavan, the architect of Vaikam Sayagraham and organizing secretary of SNDP Yogam
