= 1928 in India =

- Centuries: 18th; 19th; 20th; 21st
- Decades: 1900s; 1910s; 1920s; 1930s; 1940s
- See also: List of years in India; Timeline of Indian history

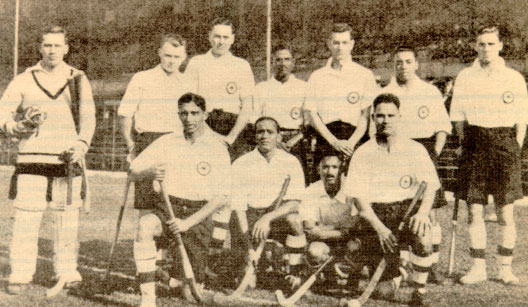
A group photo of the victorious Indian field hockey team after their debut Olympic match against Austria, 1928

Events in the year 1928 in India.

== Incumbents ==
- Emperor of India – George V
- Viceroy of India – The Lord Irwin
- British officer John Saunders Murder 17 dec.

== Events ==
- National income – ₹ 33,517 million
- February – the Simon Commission lands in India
- May – India wins Hockey Gold Medal at the Amsterdam Olympics – Games of the IXth Olympiad.
- 28 – 30 July – Ganapathi Galabhe the first recorded communal clash of Bangalore took place.
- 28 August – Nehru Report
- December – Board of Control for Cricket in India is formed.
- Undated – Kherwadi Social Welfare Association is founded.

== Births ==
- 1 January – Khan Mohammad, Pakistani cricketer (d. 2009)
- 5 January – Girish Chandra Saxena, politician (d. 2017)
- 6 January – Vijay Tendulkar, playwright, movie and television writer, literary essayist, political journalist and social commentator (died 2008).
- 27 March – Rajagopalan Krishnamurthy, cotton researcher
- 10 April – Ashok Mitra, economist and politician (d. 2018)
- 28 June – Chennaveera Kanavi, Kannada poet and author (d. 2022)
- 1 July – Ram Naresh Yadav, politician (d. 2016)
- 8 July – Balakh Sher Mazari, Pakistani politician, interim prime minister (d. 2022)
- 14 July – Bedabrata Barua, politician
- 15 July – Viramachaneni Vimla Devi, Indian parliamentarian (d. 1967)
- 19 July – Lal Chand, long-distance runner
- 24 July – Keshubhai Patel, Indian politician (d. 2020)
- 5 August – Dinesh Chandra Joarder, Indian politician (d. 2018)
- 28 August – Mambillikalathil Govind Kumar Menon, physicist and policymaker. (died 2016)
- 12 September – M. V. Rajasekharan, politician and Minister. (died 2020)
- 1 October – Sivaji Ganesan, actor (died 2001)
- 12 October – Dilbagh Singh Athwal, geneticist, agriculturist (d. 2017)
- 27 October – Datta Gaekwad, cricketer (d. 2024)
- 28 November – Bano Qudsia, Pakistani writer (d. 2017)
- 20 December – Motilal Vora, politician, Chief Minister of Uttar Pradesh (d. 2020)
- 22 December – Naresh Kumar, tennis player (d. 2022)
- 31 December – Jaggayya, actor (died 2004).

=== Full date unknown ===
- J. V. Somayajulu, actor (died 2004).

== Deaths ==
- 1 July – Nanda Kishore Bal, poet (born 1875).
- 20 September - Narayana Guru attained eternity (born 1956) at Shivagiri Mutt, Varkala, Kollam in Kerala, South India.
- 17 Nov -Lala Lajpat Rai, Indian Punjabi author and politician (born 28 January 1865).
