= Umanath =

Umanath is a given name and a surname which may refer to:

- Pappa Umanath (1931–2010), Indian politician
- R. Umanath (1921–2014), Indian politician
- Umanath Bali, Indian politician
- Umanath Singh (1937–1993), Indian politician
