= Thulasiapattinam =

Thulasiyapattinam
- village
- Country: India
- State: Tamil Nadu
- District: Nagapattinam
- Elevation: 6 m (20 ft)

Languages
  - Official: Tamil
- Time zone: UTC+5:30 (IST)
- Area code: 04369
- Vehicle registration: TN-51

Thulasiyapattinam (துளசியபட்டினம்) is a village in Nagapattinam District in the Indian state of Tamil Nadu, near Vedaranyam.

More than 250 families live in this village. The village forms the border of Nagapattinam district. The Valavanaru River is passing near the outskirts of the village.

The village was once ruled by a king named Thulasi Raja, who gave the name of the town.

Arulmigu Viswanathaswami Temple at Thulasiyapattinam dates back to the 18th century.

== Nearest cities ==
- Thiruthuraipoondi: It is 20 km from Thulasiyapattinam. The city has many shops for wholesale, four theatres, and single sex schools.
- Vedaranyam: Thulasiyapattinam is under taluk in Vedaranyam. It is 23 km from Thulasiyapattinam. It's a seashore area.
- Muthupet: Its largest area. It has a lagoon. It is 18 km from Thulasiyapattinam.
