= 1927 in India =

- Centuries: 18th; 19th; 20th; 21st
- Decades: 1900s; 1910s; 1920s; 1930s; 1940s
- See also: List of years in India; Timeline of Indian history

Events in the year 1927 in India.

== Incumbents ==
- Emperor of India – George V
- Viceroy of India – The Lord Irwin

== Events ==
- National income – ₹ 32,890 million
- 18 January – Council House in New Delhi is opened.
- 20 March – Mahad Satyagraha led by B. R. Ambedkar for Dalit rights.
- 14 April – The first formal meeting of Haj Committee of India held at Bombay.
- 28 September – Fatal communal riots in Dehra Dun, U.P.
- 12 November – Mahatma Gandhi made his first and last visit to Ceylon.
- The Simon Commission is formed to consider further steps toward self-rule of India. No Indian member is included.
- Dr. B.R. Ambedkar started temple entry movement in 1927.

== Law ==
- Indian Forest Act
- Light House Act

== Births ==
- 24 January – J. Om Prakash, film producer. (died 2019)
- 30 January – Bendapudi Venkata Satyanarayana, dermatologist (died 2005)
- 3 February – Vasant Sarwate, cartoonist and writer (died 2016)
- 28 February – Krishan Kant, politician, Vice President of India (died 2002)
- 1 March – Adoor Bhasi, actor, writer, journalist, singer and film producer (died 1990)
- 3 June – M. Narasimham, Governor of the Reserve Bank of India (died 2021)
- 10 June – Altaf Fatima, novelist. (died 2018)
- 1 July – Chandra Shekhar, politician, 8th Prime Minister of India (died 2007)
- 3 July – Balivada Kantha Rao, novelist and playwright (died 2000)
- 12 July – Muhammad Iqbal, Pakistani hammer thrower (died 1996)
- 20 July – Rajendra Kumar, actor and producer (died 1999).
- 26 August
  - B. V. Doshi, architect (died 2023)
  - Bansi Lal, Haryana's four time chief minister, and defence minister of India during Indian Emergency (1975–77) (died 2006)
- 8 November – Lal Krishna Advani, politician and former Deputy Prime Minister of India
- 8 December – Parkash Singh Badal, politician and former Chief Minister of Punjab (died 2023)
- 25 December – Ram Narayan, sarangi player (died 2024)

=== Full date unknown ===
- K. T. Muhammed, playwright (died 2008)

== Deaths ==
- 19 December – Ashfaqulla Khan, freedom fighter
- 19 December – Ram Prasad Bismil, freedom fighter
