= Thagattur Subramanyakadu =

- Village
- Location in Tamil Nadu, India
- Coordinates: 10.4558°N 79.7187°E
- Country: India
- State: Tamil Nadu
- District: Nagapattinam
- Elevation: 1 m (3.3 ft)

Population (2011)
  - Total: 2,768

Languages
  - Official: Tamil
- Time zone: UTC+5:30 (IST)
- PIN: 614806

Thagattur Subramanyakadu is a village in Nagapattinam district in the Indian state of Tamil Nadu. It is located about 10 miles (16 km) northwest of Vedaranyam.
