= Bendapudi =

Bendapudi (Telugu: బెండపూడి) is a Telugu surname. Notable people with the surname include:

- Neeli Bendapudi (fl. 2016 – present), an American academic administrator
- Bendapudi Venkata Satyanarayana (1927–2005), an Indian dermatologist
