= 1929 in India =

- Centuries: 18th; 19th; 20th; 21st
- Decades: 1900s; 1910s; 1920s; 1930s; 1940s
- See also: List of years in India; Timeline of Indian history

Events in the year 1929 in India.

== Incumbents ==
- Emperor of India – George V
- Viceroy of India – The Lord Irwin

== Events ==
- National income - ₹35,663 million
- 6 January – Mother Teresa arrives in Kolkata to work amongst poor and sick
- 29 December – All India Congress in Lahore demands independence
  - The radical nationalists, led by Jawaharlal Nehru, push through the National Congress a resolution calling for virtual independence within a year.
- Bombay Flying Club is founded by JRD Tata.
- 8 April - Batukeshwar Dutt and Bhagat Singh throw bombs in the Assembly chamber, New Delhi.

== Law ==
- Passage of the Child Marriage Restraint Act, 1929.

== Births ==
- 1 January – Latif-ur Rehman, hockey player (died 1987).
- 8 January – Saeed Jaffrey, actor (died 2015).
- 2 February – Dalit Bandhu N. K. Jose, historian (died 2024).
- 7 February – Sartaj Aziz, Pakistani economist and politician (died 2024).
- 28 February – Rangaswamy Srinivasan, Indian-born American chemist and inventor.
- 20 March – Muhammad Hamza, Pakistani politician, (died 2021).
- 24 March – Ataullah Mengal, Pakistani politician, (died 2021).
- 29 March – Utpal Dutt, actor, director and writer (died 1993).
- 24 April – Dr. Rajkumar, actor and singer (died 2006).
- 1 May – S. G. Neginhal, conservationist, (died 2021).
- 29 May – Dwijen Sharma, Bangladeshi naturalist (died 2017)
- 1 June – Nargis, actress (died 1981).
- 4 June – Kapil Narayan Tiwari, activist and politician (died 2022).
- 15 June – Suraiya, actress and singer (died 2004).
- 14 July – V. C. Kulandaiswamy, academic and author (died 2016)
- 20 July – Hosbet Suresh, judge (died 2020)
- 25 July – Somnath Chatterjee, politician and Speaker of the 14th Lok Sabha (died 2018).
- 4 August – Kishore Kumar, playback singer, actor, lyricist, composer, producer, director, screenwriter and scriptwriter (died 1987).
- 28 August – Purushottama Lal, poet, essayist, translator, professor and publisher (died 2010).
- 6 September – Yash Johar, film producer (died 2004).
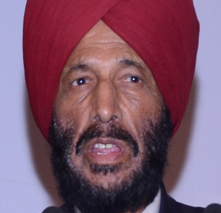
  Milkha Singh
- 28 September – Lata Mangeshkar, "Bharatratna", internationally acclaimed playback singer, actor, lyricist, composer, producer. (died 2022)
- 29 September – Syed Ali Shah Geelani, Pakistani separatist leader (died 2021)
- 30 September – Mir Hazar Khan Khoso, Pakistani judge and politician (died 2021)
- 29 October – Rabey Hasani Nadwi, Sunni Muslim scholar (died 2023)
- 31 October – Muktha Srinivasan, film director and producer (died 2018)
- 2 November – Muhammad Rafiq Tarar, politician and jurist, 9th President of Pakistan (died 2022)
- 20 November – Milkha Singh, Olympic sprinter (died 2021)
- 25 December – Swami Smaranananda, monk (died 2024)

=== Full date unknown ===
- Vimala Rangachar, educationist (died 2025)

== Deaths ==
- 4 January - Seshadri Swamigal, Hindu Saint (born 1870).
- 20 February - Rattanbai Jinnah, wife of Muhammad Ali Jinnah, founder of Pakistan
- 30 May - Pamban Swamigal, Hindu Sage (born 1848).
