= A. Vaidyanatha Iyer =

Indian activist

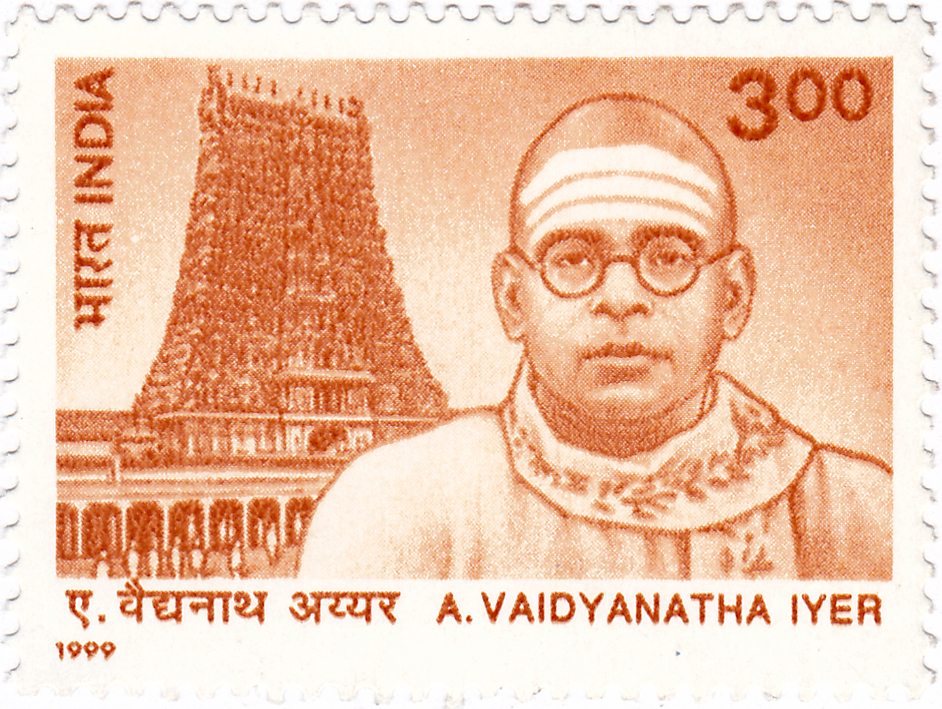
A. Vaidyanatha Iyer on a 1999 stamp of India

A. Vaidyanatha Iyer (16 May 1890 – 23 February 1955), also known as Madurai Vaidyanatha Iyer or Ayyar, was an Indian activist, politician and freedom-fighter who spearheaded the temple entry movement in Madras Presidency in 1939.

== Early life ==
Vaidynatha iyer was born on 16th May 1890 in Vishnampettai Village, Thanjavur in then Madras Presidency in 1890 as the second of eight children in a Tamil Brahmin family to Arunachalam Iyer and Lakshmi Ammal. His siblings were Raamanaathan, Kamalaamba, Sankaran, Vaalaamba, Parvathi, Subramanian, Sivakaami. Iyer was a math teacher in Pudukkottai Maharaja's school. AV Iyer studied in Madurai Sethupathi High School. In 1909, he completed his SSLC. Iyer got his FA in Madura College. He was awarded the prestigious Neelakanda Sastri gold medal along as well as the Fisher gold medal by the institution. At the age of 18, after his FA examinations, Iyer's parents conducted his marriage with 9 year old Akilandam, who remained his spouse for the rest of his life. Iyer received his BA 1914 from Madras Presidency College. He was a teacher for a year at Bishop Heber Higher Secondary School in Trichy and for a year at Masoolipattinam Hindu Higher Secondary School, prior to qualifying himself in law and acquiring the status of Pleader. He entered the Indian independence movement in 1922 when he participated in the Non-Cooperation Movement. He also participated in the Vedaranyam Salt Satyagraha (1930) and the Quit India Movement of 1942.

== Temple Entry Movement ==
The Temple Entry Authorization and Indemnity Act was passed by the government of in 1939 by which restrictions prohibiting Nadars and Dalits from entering Hindu temples was removed. During this time, Vaidyanatha Iyer was the President of the Tamil Nadu Harijan Seva Sangh. On 8 July 1939, Vaidyanatha Iyer entered the Meenakshi temple at Madurai in the company of L. N. Gopalaswami and six of his Dalit friends, P. Kakkan, Muruganandam, Chinniah, Purnalingam and Muthu. This was stringently opposed by upper-caste Hindu leaders and those seeking to preserve Varnashrama Dharma.

In addition, Periyar commented it as a political drama to counter Justice Party in the upcoming elections 1926 Madras Presidency Legislative Council election.

== Death and legacy ==
The Tamil Nadu Harijan Sevak Sangh wrote a biography in honor of Iyer that was named “Harijana Thanthai Amarar Vaidyanatha Iyerin Vazhkai Varalaaru (Biography of the Immortal Vaidyanatha Iyer, Father to all Harijans)”. The biography was written by Professor P. S. Chandraprabhu in 1991. A new edition of the book was published in March 2012. Iyer was dedicated to the freedom movement and helped socially depressed people as well as the people of his constituency. He did not participate in the election in 1952 because he was getting too frail. In his final days, even the best medical procedures couldn't save him. Every year, on Iyer's death anniversary (February 23), people pay respect to him by garlanding a statue of him. Every year on that day, respects are paid to his memorial at the Chennai Thakkar Baba Vidyalaya School and the Madurai ‘Sevalayam’, which was started by Iyer in 1932 to serve Harijans. Vaidyanatha Iyer died in 1955. A postage stamp was issued in his memory by the Government of India on 9 December 1999.

== Publications ==
- A. Vaidyanatha Ayyar, P. S. Chandraprabu (1999). Voice of a great soul: speeches of Shri A. Vaidyanatha Ayyar in Madras. Gandhi Memorial Museum.
