= Martial Paillot =

French Roman Catholic missionary (1855 or 1856-1930)

Martial Jean Baptiste Paillot
- Born: 1855 or 1856; Ménil sur Saulx, France
- Died: September 16, 1930; Bangalore, India

Father Martial Jean Baptiste Paillot (born 1855 or 1856; died September 16, 1930) was a French Roman Catholic missionary, history professor and parish priest. He served as a missionary in Pondicherry, India for 44 years.

== Early life ==
Paillot was born in Ménil sur Saulx, France, the second in a family of ten children (four of whom died at a young age). (Sources differ as to his date of birth, either 1855 or 1856 are given). Little is known about his youth. His younger brother described him as very studious, sporty, with a combative nature.

He studied at the Minor and Major Seminary in Verdun, and ordained as a priest on June 30, 1881.

He worked as a history professor at the Minor Seminary in Verdun for two years, then became a vicar in Montmédy, then entered the Foreign Missions Seminary (Séminaire des Missions Étrangères) in Paris in 1885. After spending a year there he was posted to the mission in Pondicherry, India, where he lived for the rest of his life. During his first years there a brother and his mother died.

== Life in India ==
He arrived in Pondicherry in 1886 and was named the vicar of the Our Lady of Angels Church in July 1887. He was temporarily assigned to the Colonial College in 1894 while its director returned to France due to health concerns; when the director returned in 1885, Father Paillot returned to Our Lady of Angels. He developed malarial fever, which put his life in danger and necessitated a change in climate.

He was sent to the mountains of Ceylon. Working in Kandy as secretary for Mgr. Zaleski, the apostolic delegate in India, his health slowly improved, and he followed the Monsignor to his various apostolic wanderings in India for about a year. He returned to Pondicherry in 1926, again serving as vicar at Our Lady of Angels. When the parish priest retired, he took over the position.

== Final years ==
From 1929 his health began to decline. He suffered from frequent malaise and vomiting, with an old lymphangitis worsening and his legs weakening. He was sent to Saint Martha’s Hospital in Bangalore on August 23, 1930, where he died on September 16.

An article in La Croix on November 26, 1931, introduced him to the French public, with title "The body of a French missionary is found intact after a long stay in the ground, exactly from September 16, 1930, to October 18, 1931". It mentions that he was buried in Bangalore and had a funeral in Pondicherry. The article says that when his body was exhumed, the people present expected to find nothing but bones. The wooden coffin had been eaten by termites, but the body was not terribly damaged with little odor; the skin had taken a coppery hue. His body was taken to Pondicherry on October 19, where he was given a funeral and buried at the church.
