= Kovilpathu =

- village
- Location in Tamil Nadu, India Kovilpathu (India)
- Coordinates: 10.542°N 79.83°E
- Country: India
- State: Tamil Nadu
- District: Nagai

Government
  - Type: Village
  - Body: Nagapattinam (District)

Area
  - Total: 12 km^{2} (4.6 sq mi)

Population (2004)
  - Total: 2,348
  - Density: 200/km^{2} (510/sq mi)

Languages
  - Official: Tamil
- Time zone: UTC+5:30 (IST)
- PIN: 611112
- Website: www.nagapattinam.tn.nic.in/

Kovilpathu is a village in the Vedaranyam taluk of Nagapattinam district, Tamil Nadu, India. Current Panchayath president is Aanandhi Sarabojirajan. The name Kovil pathu name comes from ‘Kuvalai Pathiram’. In the Mahabharata, rishi Durvasa came to the residence of the Pandava to have lunch. But the Akshaya Patra, the vessel that could provide unlimited food, had one limitation that it could be used only once a day, and it had been done so. Draupadi, not knowing what to do, prayed to Krishna who took from the pot, a single grain of rice and ate it. Since the rice was offered with genuine devotion, Krishna's stomach was completely filled by just that one grain of rice, and so was Durvasa's stomach.

The Akshaya Patra in Tamil, is called ‘Kuvalai Pathiram’, which in due course of time, became ‘Kovil Pathu’.

== Demographics ==
Kovilpathu is a coastal village in the Indian state of Tamil Nadu. It is located in the Vedaranyam taluk of the Nagapattinam district. Based on the 2001 census in India and numerous village and tsunami censuses after the 2004 Indian Ocean tsunami, it has a population of approximately 2348 people, most of whom are poor and are "low caste." The village's primary businesses, like other villages on the coast of Tamil Nadu, are farming and fishing. The entire Nagapattinam district was severely affected by the Indian Ocean tsunamis, however, Kovilpathu emerged virtually unscathed. This was due to the presence of a very large windbreak planted by inhabitants of the region in 2002

As per the 2001 census, Kovilpathu had a total population of 2348 with 1165 males and 1183 females. The sex ratio was 1015. The literacy rate was 81.27.

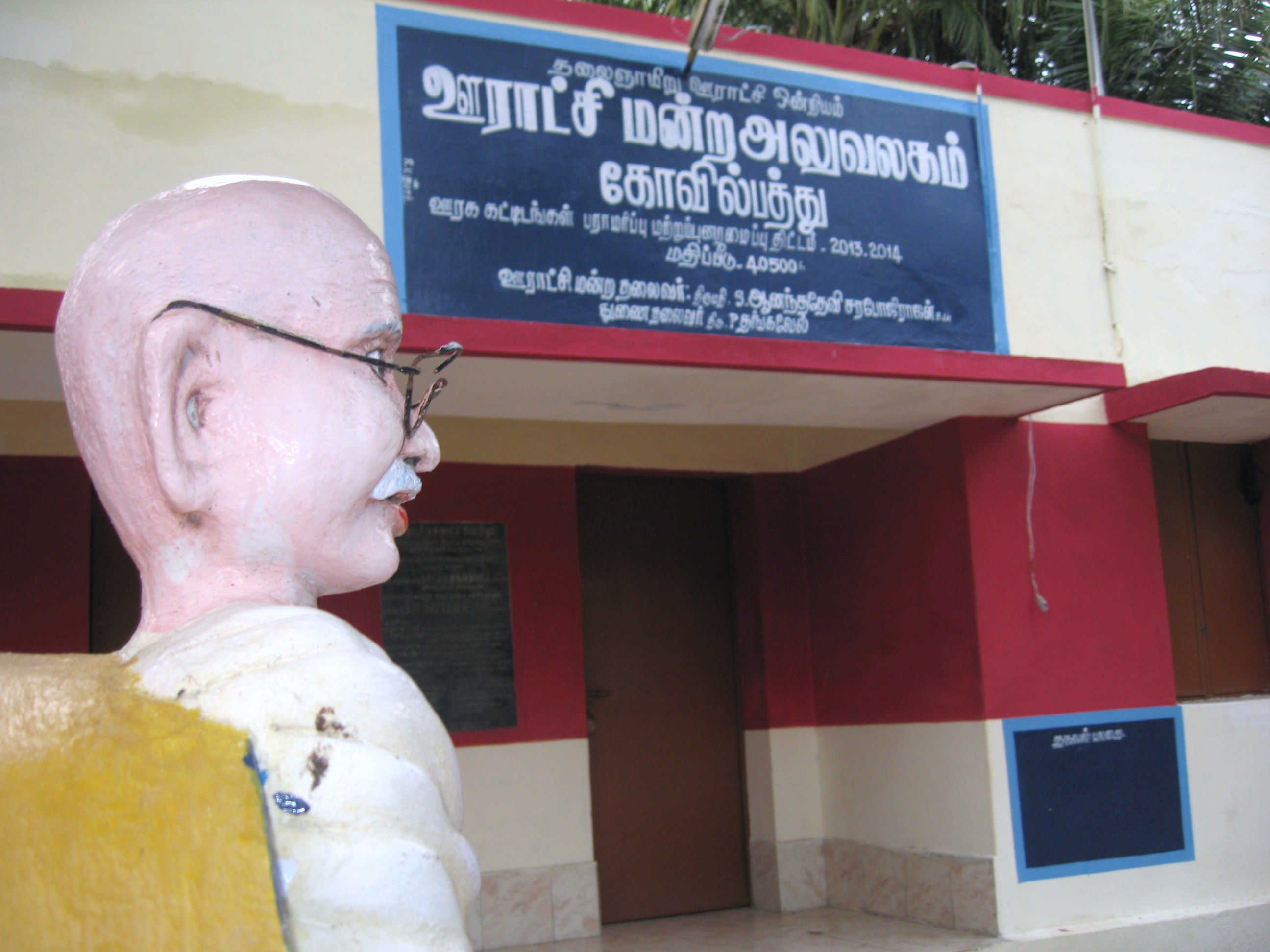
Kovilpathu Panjayat Office

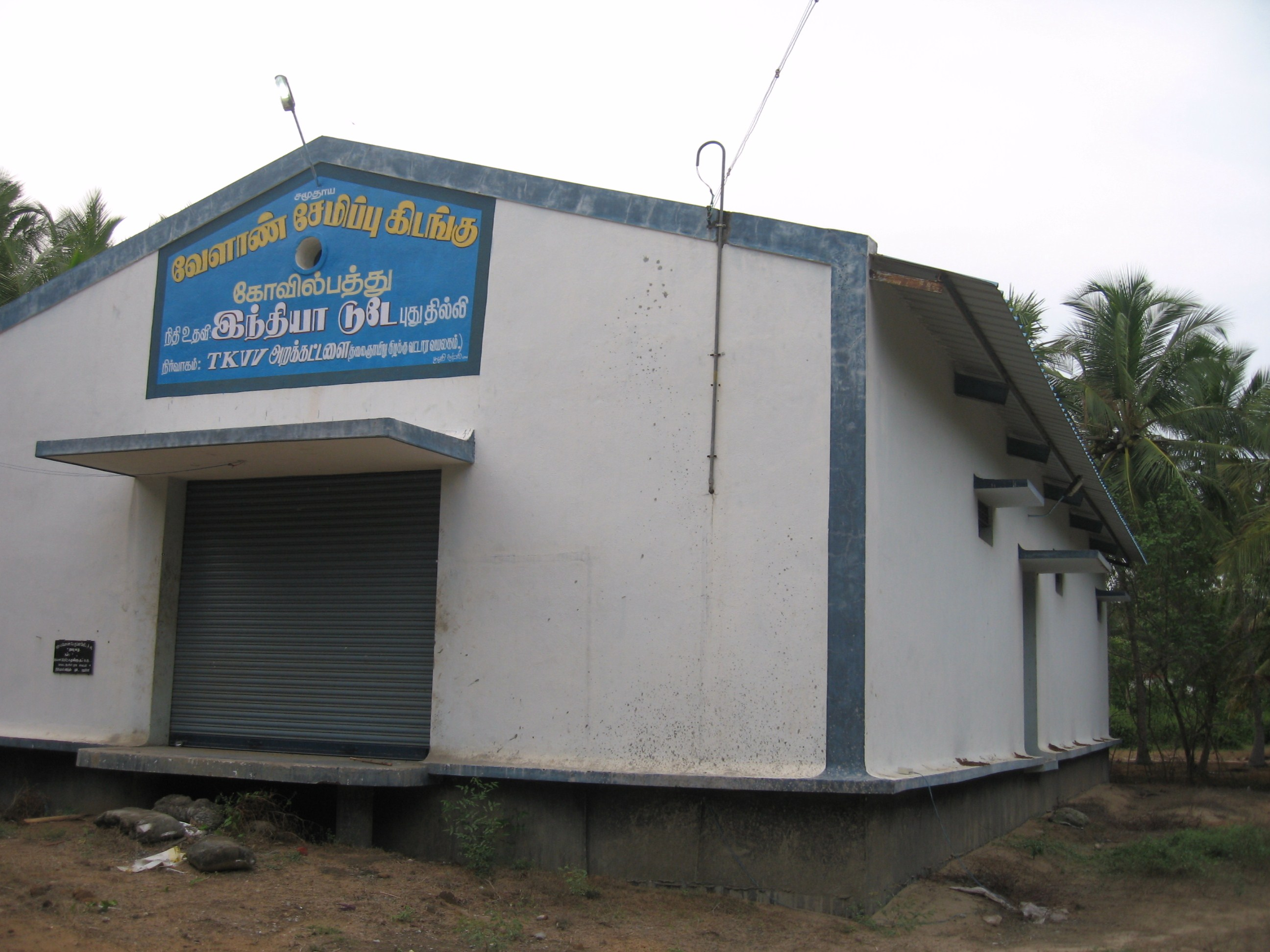
Godown to keep Agri products

== Temples Around The Village ==
- Kovilpathu Mariamman Koil
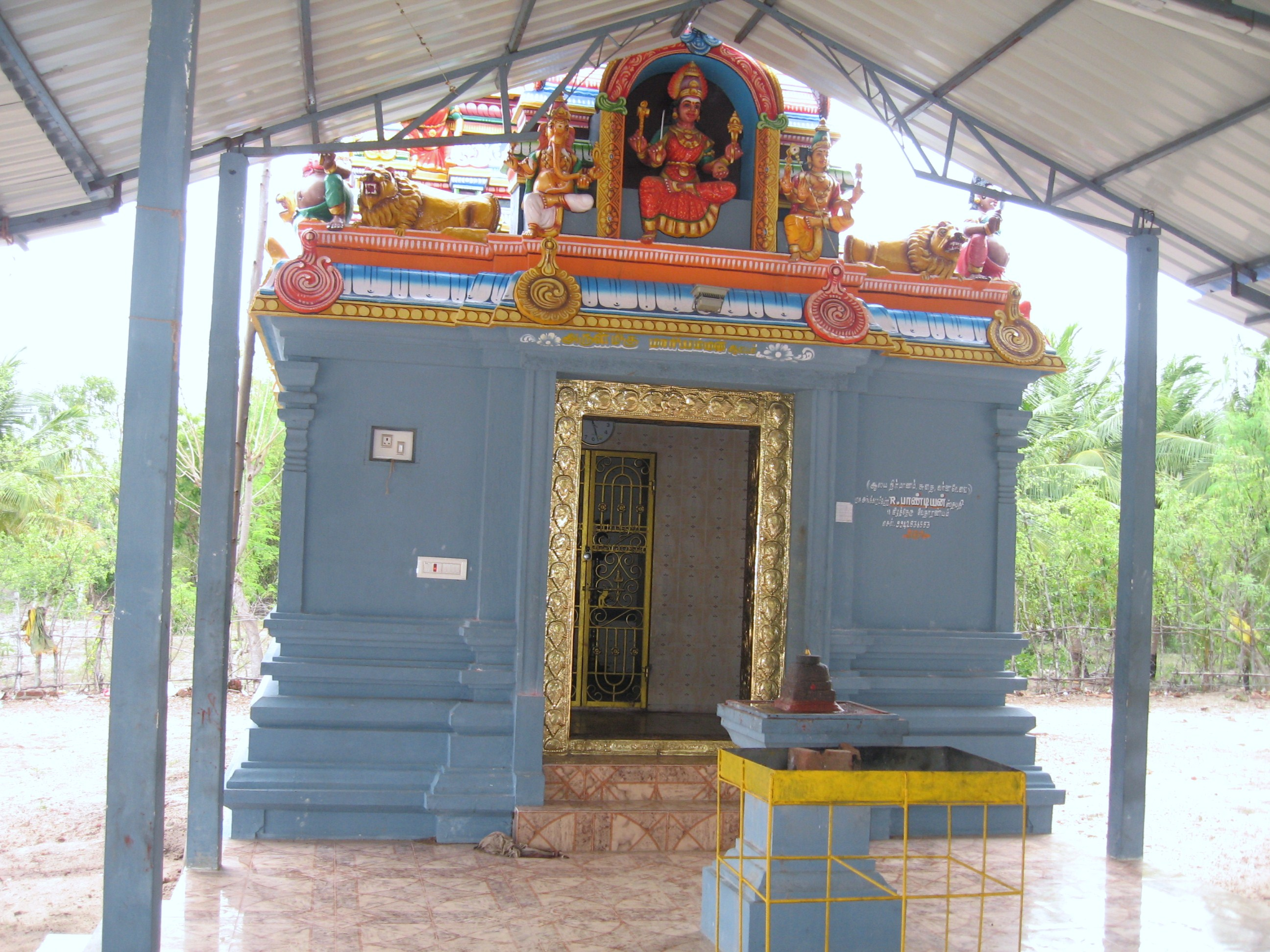
Kovilpathu Mariamman Koil
- Perumal Kovil
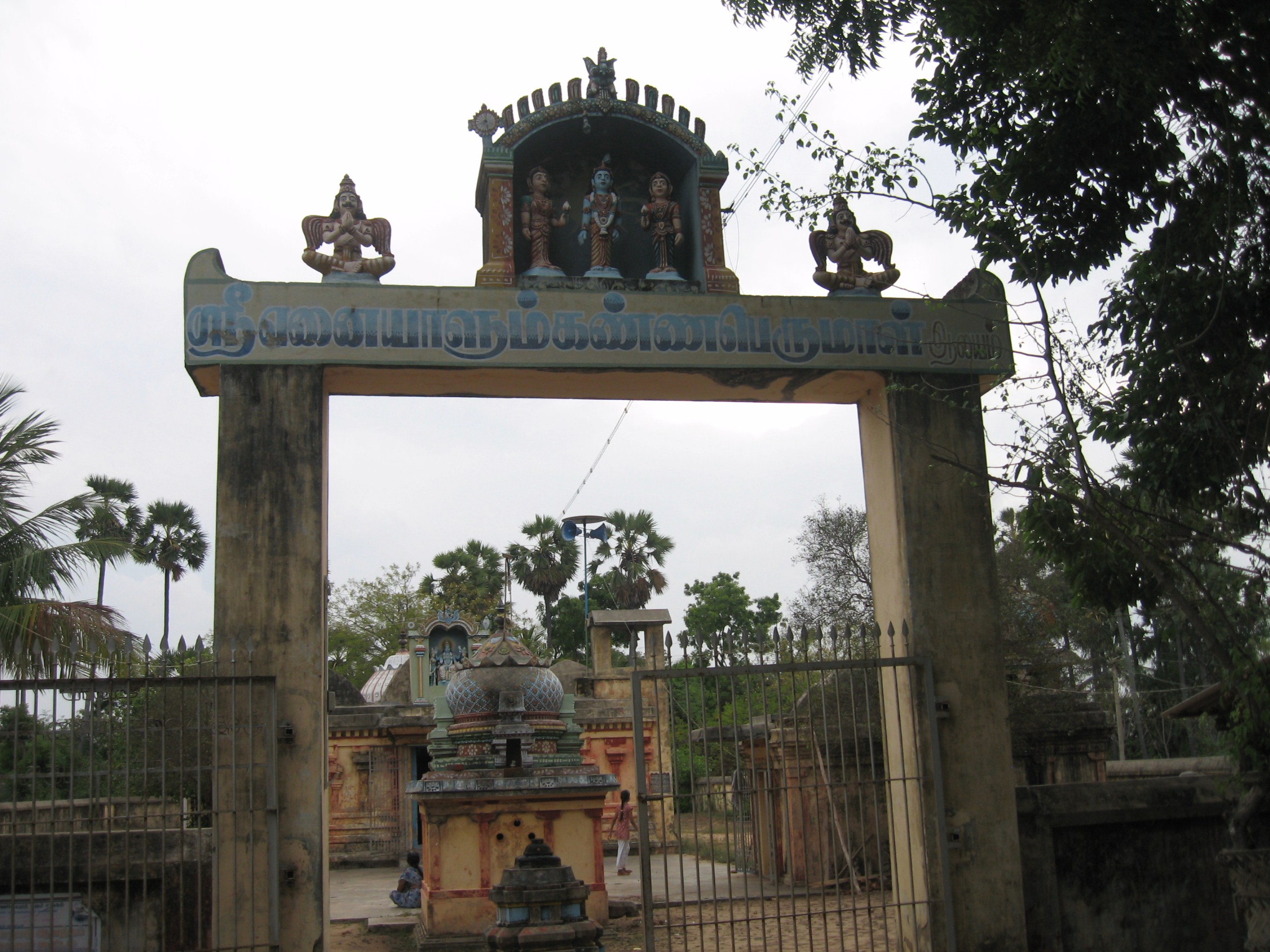
Perumal Kovil Entrance

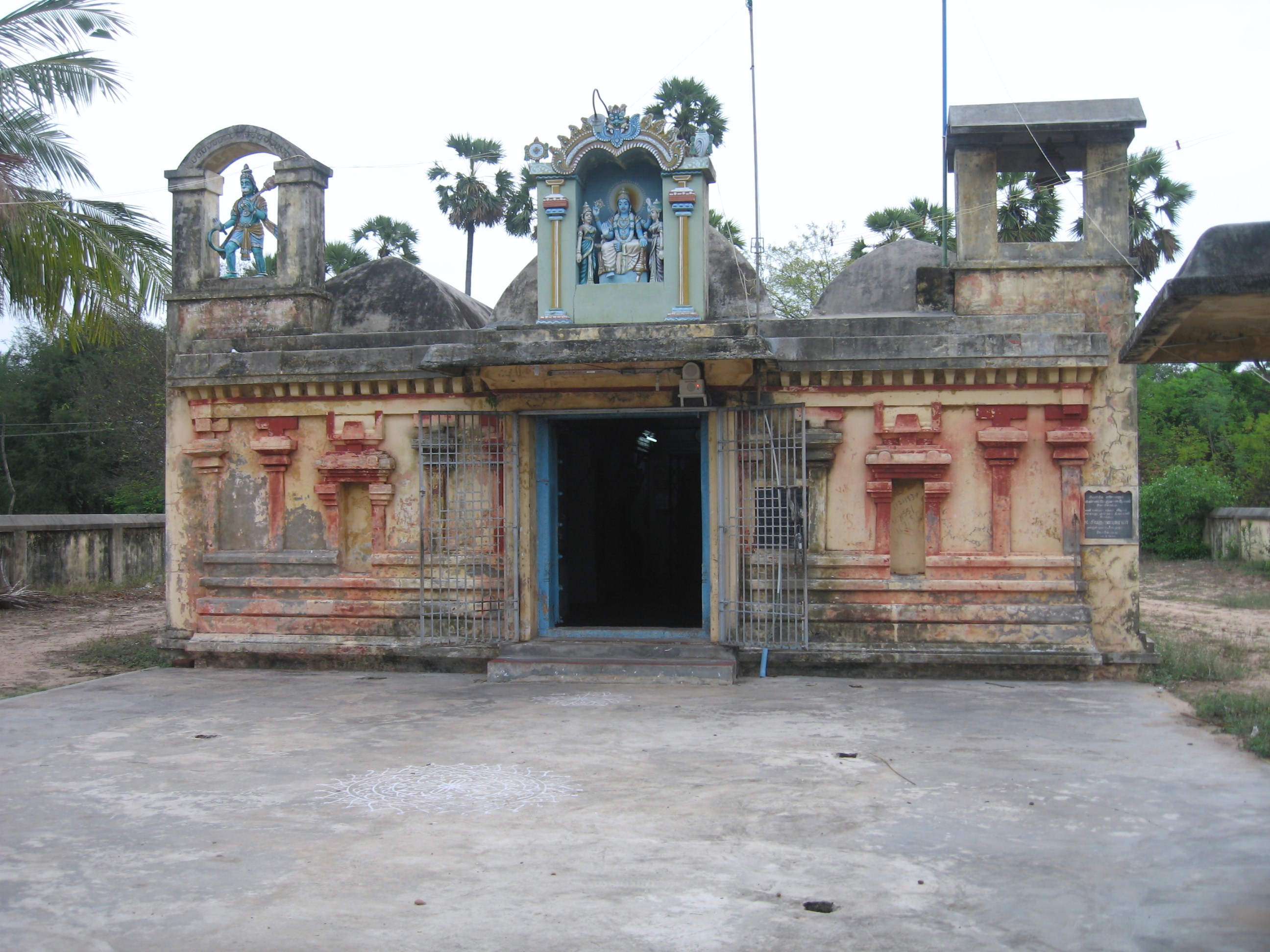
Perumal Kovil Full View
- Madha Kovil
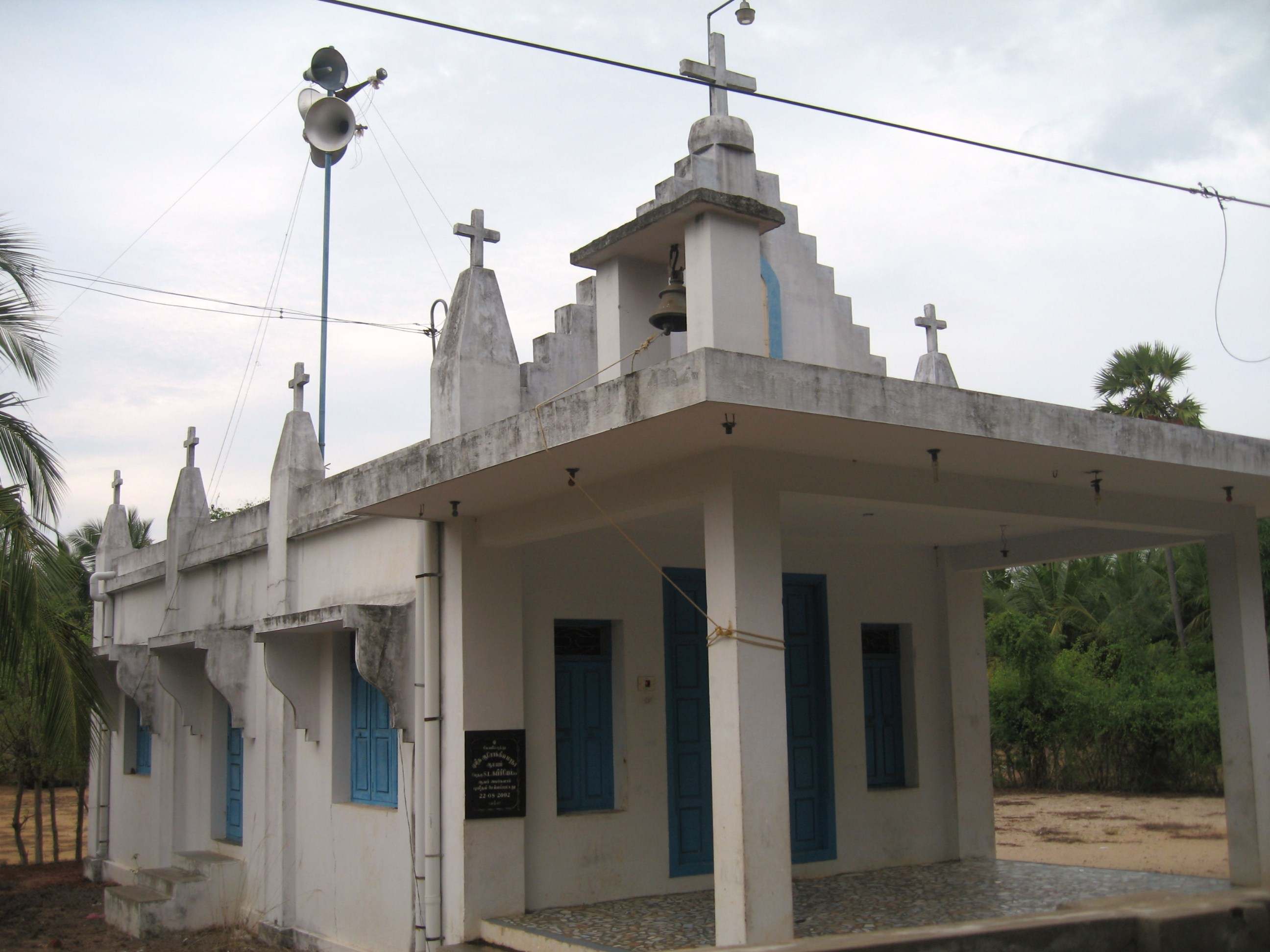
Kovilpathu Madha Koil
