= U. Vasuki =

Indian politician and trade unionist

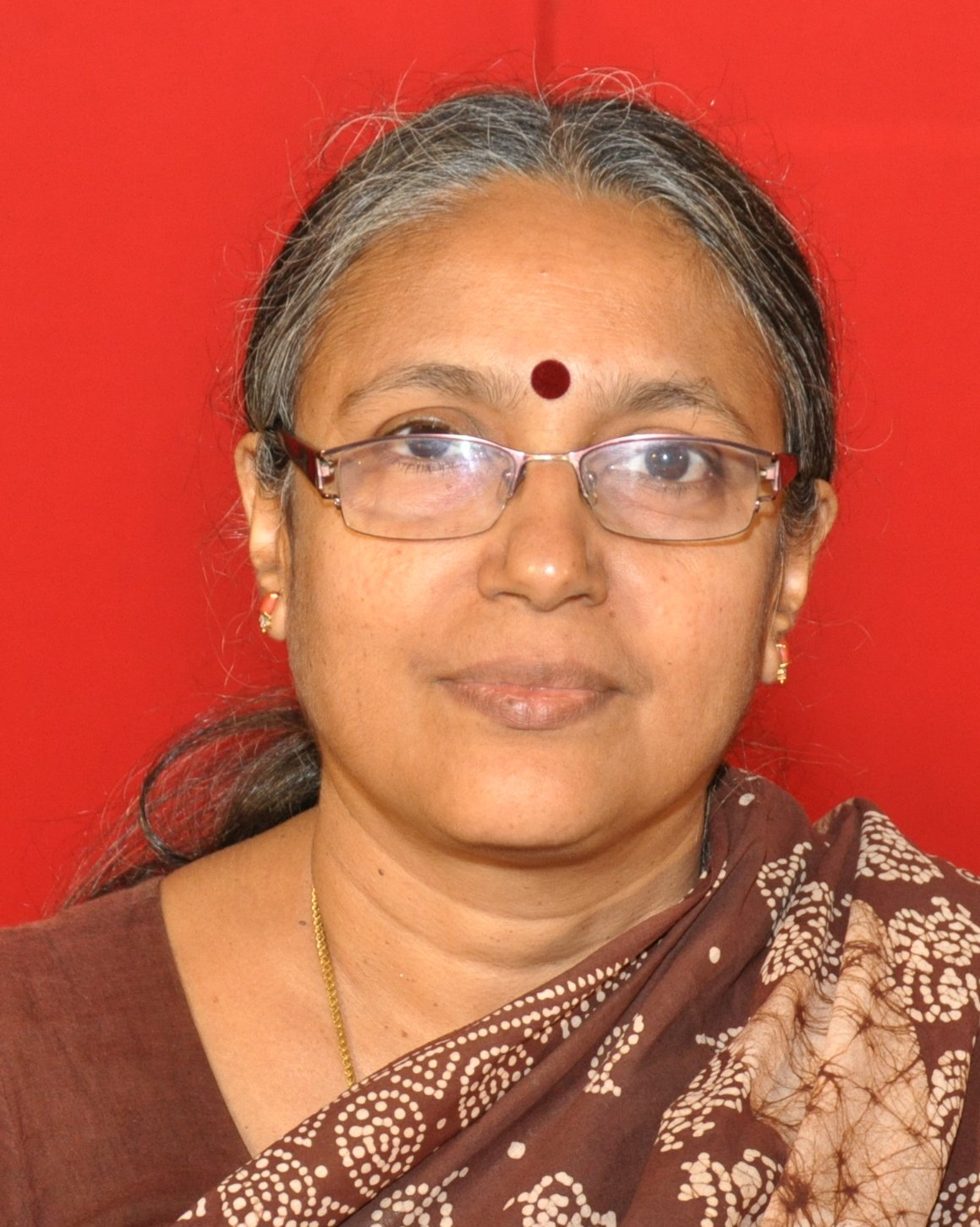

Personal details
- Born: Tiruchirappalli, Tamil Nadu, India
- Party: Communist Party of India (Marxist)
- Parents: R. Umanath (father); Pappa Umanath (mother)
- Occupation: Social activist, politician

Umanath Vasuki is an Indian politician and trade unionist from Tamil Nadu, India. As of 2017, she is a central committee member of the Communist Party of India (Marxist) and the National Vice President of the All India Democratic Women's Association.

== Biography ==
Vasuki was born and raised in the suburb of Uraiyur in Tiruchirappalli, Tamil Nadu, to communist politicians R. Umanath and Pappa Umanath. Her father, a member of the Communist Party of India (Marxist) (CPI (M)), was elected two times each to the Lok Sabha (1962 and 1977) and the Tamil Nadu Legislative Assembly (1977 and 1980). Her mother, a founding member of the All India Democratic Women's Association, was elected to the Tamil Nadu Legislative Assembly from the Thiruverumbur constituency in 1989.

After graduating with a bachelor's degree in commerce, Vasuki joined the Communist Party of India (Marxist) (abbreviated CPI(M) or CPM) in 1977. She started her career as a banking professional and was associated with the Canara Bank and the Union Bank of India. She opted for voluntary retirement from service in 2000 to become a full-time member of the CPM.

Vasuki unsuccessfully contested in the 2014 Indian general election from Chennai North. Following that, in the 2016 Tamil Nadu assembly election she contested from Madurai West and lost.
