= Pappa Umanath =

Indian politician

Personal details
- Born: Dhanalakshmi; 5 August 1931 Kovilpathu, Tanjore District, Madras Presidency, British India
- Died: 17 December 2010 (aged 79) Tiruchirappalli, Tamil Nadu, India
- Party: Communist Party of India (Marxist)
- Spouse: R. Umanath
- Children: U. Vasuki U.Nethravathy & U.Niramala Rani

Pappa Umanath (5 August 1931 – 17 December 2010) was an Indian politician from the southern state of Tamil Nadu and a women's rights activist who co-founded the All India Democratic Women's Association in 1973. She was a member of the Communist Party of India (Marxist) and was elected from the Thiruverumbur Constituency to the Tamil Nadu Legislative Assembly in 1989.

== Life and career ==
Pappa Umanath was born as Dhanalakshmi on 5 August 1931 in Kovilpathu, near Karaikal, Madras Presidency, British India (now in Puducherry, a Union Territory in India). Her mother, Lakshmi, alias Alamelu, moved to Golden Rock, Tiruchirappalli after her husband's death. Lakshmi started a canteen near the Golden Rock Railway Workshop for railway workers. The railway workers who came to the canteen used to call Dhanalakshmi "Pappa" (small girl), which became the origin of her name. At a young age, Pappa participated in several agitations along with her mother and railway workers.

Dhanalakshmi joined the Communist Party of India (CPI) in 1945 and moved to Madras (now Chennai). In 1948, the CPI was banned by the Government of India and members of the party were arrested, including Dhanalakshmi, her mother, and a number of the party's leaders. In the jail, when members of the party went on a fast against authorities, her mother died after 23 days of fasting. Pappa was not allowed by the jail authorities to attend her mother's funeral, as she refused to quit the party.

In 1952, Dhanalakshmi married fellow party member R. Umanath in a self-respect marriage. She was arrested again during the Sino-Indian war. In 1964, her party split in two, and she joined the newly formed Communist Party of India (Marxist) (CPI(M)). She co-founded the All India Democratic Women's Association in 1973 and became its general secretary.

She contested the 1984 Tamil Nadu Legislative Assembly election from Thiruverumbur Constituency, but lost. She won the election in 1989 but lost again in 1991.

She had three daughters, one of whom was U. Vasuki, a CPI(M) politician. She died on 17 December 2010 in Trichy.
