= Our Lady of Angels Church, Puducherry =

Our Lady of Angels Church
- Église Notre-Dame des Anges
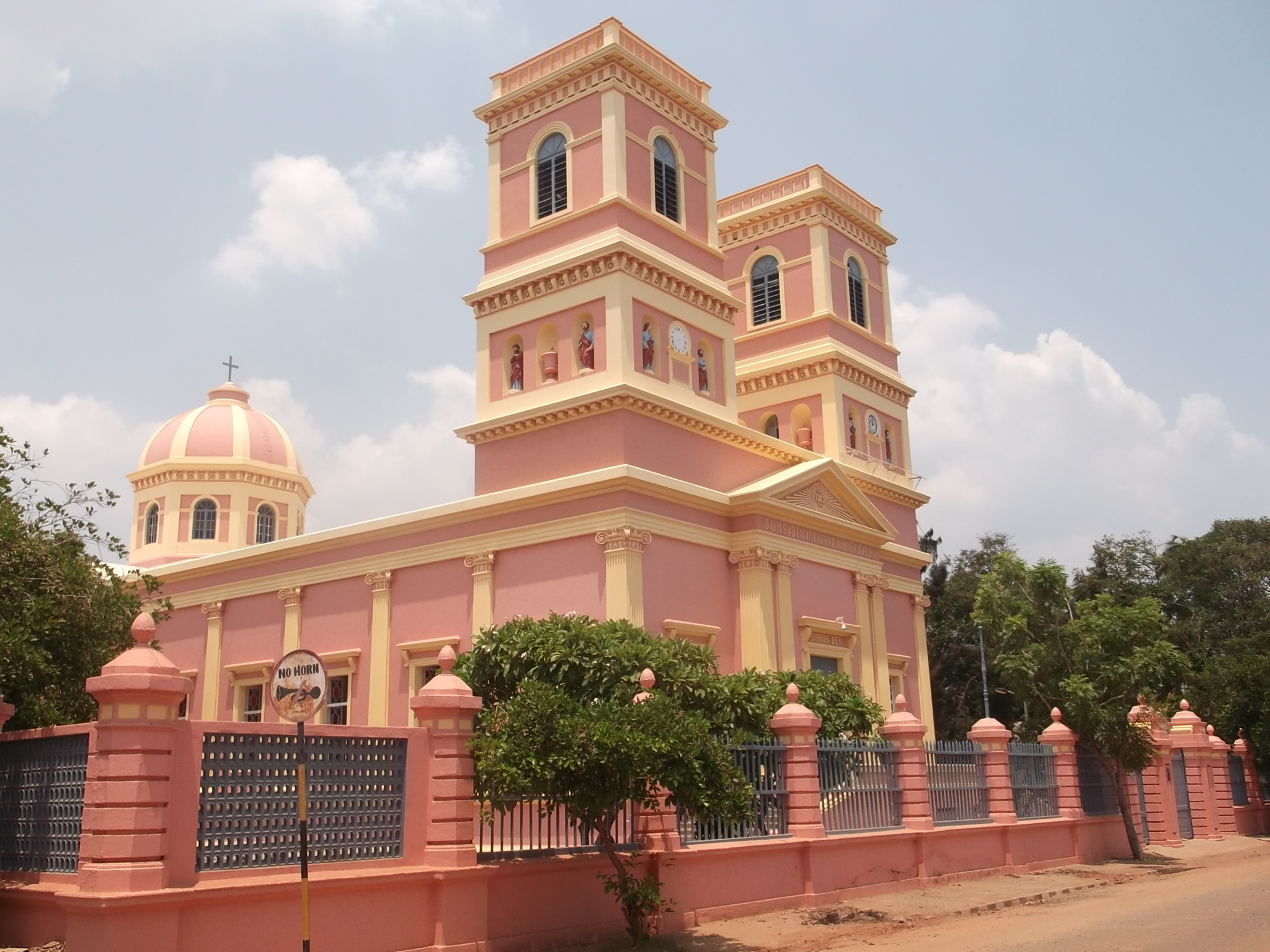
- Front view of the church

- Location within Puducherry
- 11.930090°N 79.834582°E
- Location: Rue Dumas, White town, Puducherry
- Country: India
- Denomination: Catholic

History
- Status: Parish church
- Founded: 1855
- Dedication: Our Lady of Angels

Architecture
- Functional status: Active
- Architect: Louis Guerre
- Architectural type: Chapel
- Style: Greco Roman architecture

Administration
- Archdiocese: Pondicherry and Cuddalore

Our Lady of Angels Church (also called Église Notre-Dame des Anges, White Chapel, Kaps Koil) is the fourth oldest church in Puducherry, a Union territory in South India. The original structure was built in Greco Roman architecture by Napoleon III in 1855, with the architect being Louis Guerre. It is the only church in Pondicherry city that offers mass in three languages namely French, Tamil and English.

Our Lady of Angels Church is a working church with hourly prayer and daily services and follows Roman Catholic sect of Christianity. The chapel was controlled by Capuchin priests, Holy Spirit Fathers subsequently and finally during 1887 changed hands to Foreign Mission Fathers from Paris. It is one of the most prominent landmarks in Puducherry and faces the Bay of Bengal. The Church is locally called Dumas Church since it is located in Dumas Street in White Town.

== Architecture ==
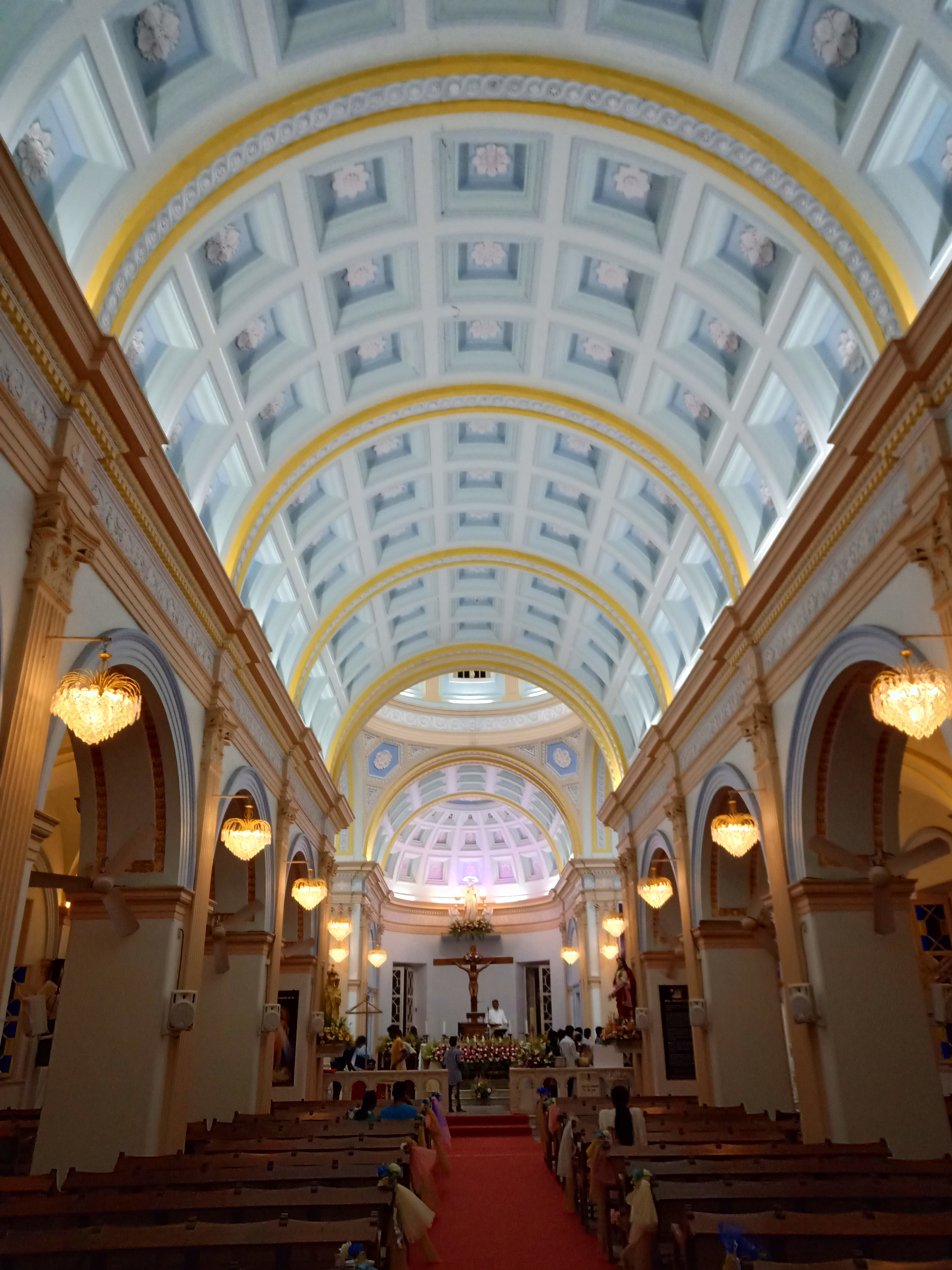
Inside view of the church

The church is built in Greco-Roman architecture with the main chapel with two pillars on either sides. The two pillars were originally used to house the clocks, which are not functional in modern times. Originally they used to strike every two hours with the singing of Ave Maria. The shrine faces the East facing the sea towards Bay of Bengal. The altar is originally believed to have a statue of Our Lady of Angels, but houses a Holy Cross in modern times. There is a statue of Joan of Arc donated to the church by the then Mayor of Puducherry, Francois Gaudart during 1919. The twin tower has stained glass windows that sport red, blue and yellow colours.

The original chapel was painted white in colour both from the inside and the outside, giving the name White Chapel. A special mixture of paint, egg and limestone were used to paint the walls. The colours of the exterior were changed during 1900s and interiors during the 2000s. The bells in the temple are believed to have been procured from France. The bell had a complex mechanism with pulleys and ropes connected to a rope all the way downstairs. During 2012, after a renovation of the chapel, the operation of the bell has been suspended on account of vibrational effects causing hindrance to neighbouring structure. The temple is locally called Dumas Church since it is located in Dumas Street in White Town.

== History ==
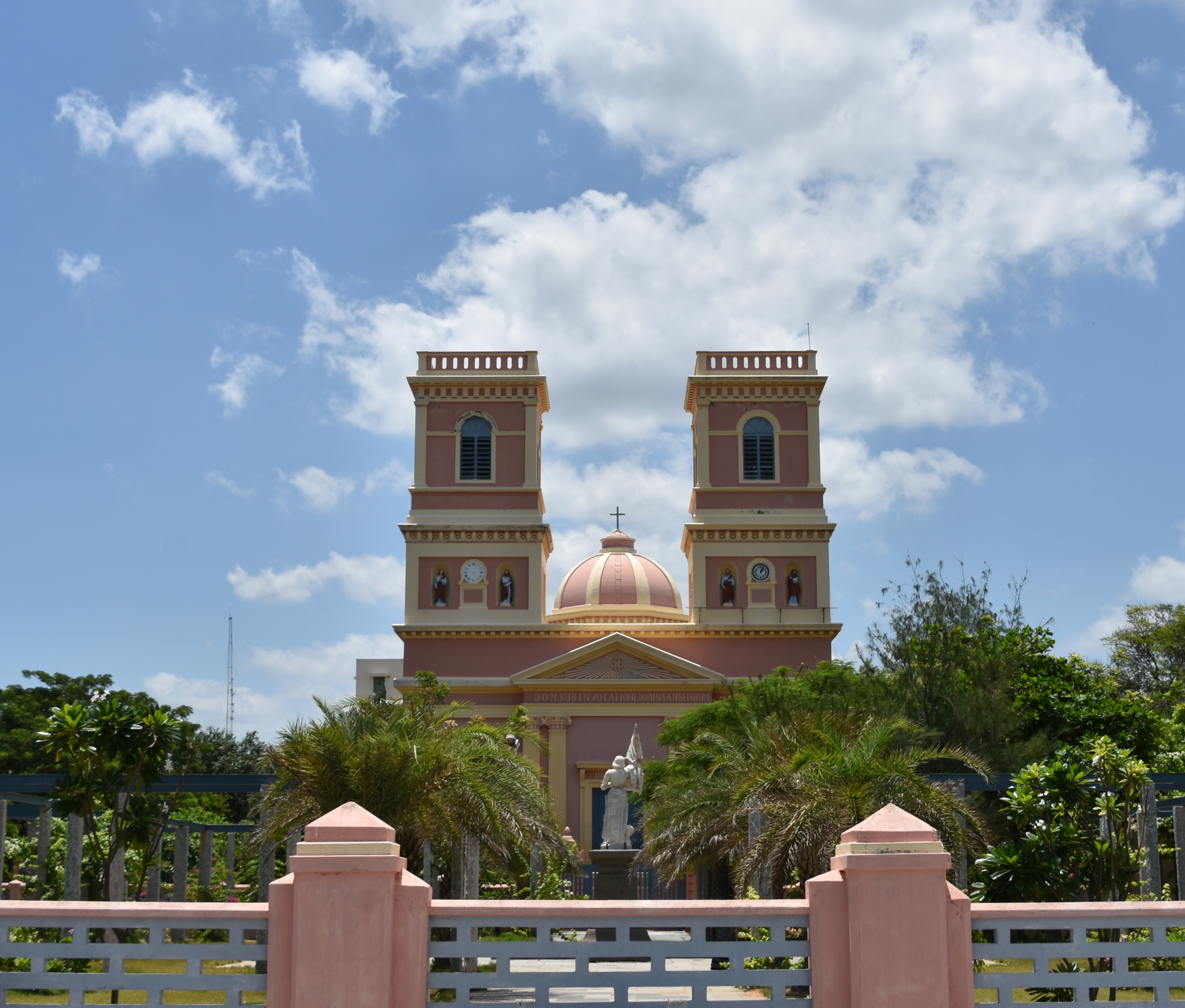
Front view of the church

The first arrival of the Franciscan Capuchins to India was Pondicherry in 1632. Capuchins were the very first missionaries to Pondicherry. The first mission came to an end within two years in 1634. When Francois Martin founded the city of Pondicherry in 1673, he invited the French Capuchins from Madras for the spiritual animation of the French and for the evengelization of Tamils. In 1674, the French Capuchin missionary Cosmos de Gien founded the first Christian mission in Pondicherry. The Church of the Capuchins served as the seat of the Capuchin Prefects. After 154 years of zealous missionary enterprise the Capuchin mission was handed over to the Holy Spirit Fathers in 1828. This Capuchin mission came to an end due to the shortage of missionaries in France.Based on records in National Archives in Pondicherry 1777, historian Jayasheela Stephen argues that the Capuchins, the original monks, wanted the church to be with a height of 40 ft (12 m) in 1746 and planned to build it close to the fort. As per the rule of the Governor of Pondicherry, no building could be built 200 m (660 ft) close the fort and with a height above 50 ft (15 m). The proposal was rejected stating the risk and the monks withdrew the idea. Our Lady of Angels Church is the fourth oldest church in Puducherry. The original structure was built in Greco Roman architecture by Napoleon III (c. 1852–70) in 1855, with the architect being Louis Guerre. It is believed to be based on Notre-Dame in Paris and the Basilica at Lourdes. Napoleon III visited the chapel as the first place when he visited Pondicherry. It is understood that there were four churches in the campus and British demolished the church and converted it into two orphanages. It is believed that Napoleon III donated an oil painting of Our Lady of Assumption to the church.

== Worship practises ==
The priests in the church were originally only French, but during modern times, Tamil people were also appointed. The chapel was controlled by Capuchin priests, Holy Spirit Fathers subsequently and finally during 1887 changed hands to Foreign Mission Fathers from Paris. It is now under the purview of the Archdiocese of Pondicherry and Cuddalore. The Church got its name, Kaps Kovil from Capuchin Friars, who were the founders of this church. It is the only church that offers mass in three languages namely French, Tamil and English. Mass is offered various times of the day starting at 6:15 AM in some days to 6:45 PM. Novena is prayed at 6:30 PM in French during Tuesdays and Fridays, adoration and benediction at 6 PM during first Fridays in Tamil and at 6:45 PM on Saturdays. The annual feast of the church is organized during the second Sunday in August. Rosary service is held at 6 PM during Mondays and Fridays.

== See also ==
- Louis-François de Bausset - A French prelate (later raised to cardinalate) born in the Parish of Our Lady of Angels Church
