= Sardar Vedaratnam =

Sardar Vedaratnam Pillai
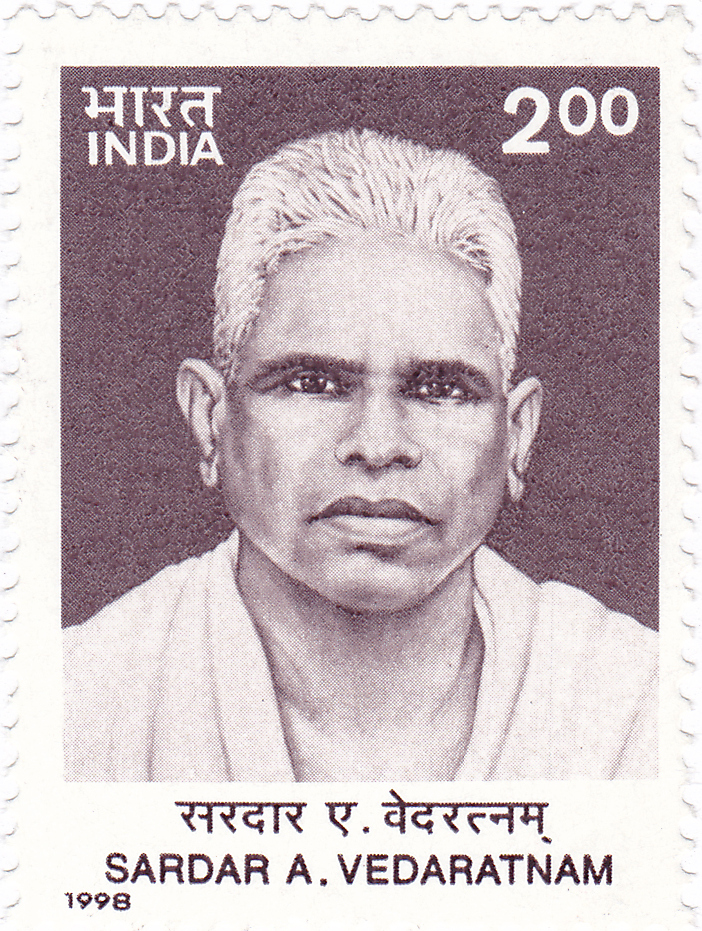
- Vedaratnam on a 1998 stamp of India
- Born: 25 February 1897; Vedaranyam, India
- Died: 24 August 1961 (aged 64)
- Occupations: Freedom fighter, philanthropist

Sardar Vedaratnam Pillai (25 February 1897 – 24 August 1961) was an Indian freedom-fighter, a leader of the Indian National Congress and a famous philanthropist who served as an MLA for three terms over a period of 14 years. He is known for his heroic contributions in the salt march of Vedaranyam in 1930, alongside C. Rajagopalachari.

Following the influence of Gandhiji, Vedaratnam opted to boycott foreign cloth (Swadehsi) and strictly make and wear pure cotton clothing, and encouraged those around him to do the same. He was also passionate about the Freedom Struggle, in which spent much time protesting and even getting arrested for doing so.

In the year 1931, Vedaratnam was conferred with the title of ‘Sardar’ at the meeting of the Tamil Nadu Agriculturists and labourers at Tirunelveli, for his exploits in the Vedaranyam Salt March.

He was multi-lingual and patronized many native arts. In 1946, he founded the Kasturba Gandhi Kanya Gurukulam which is a rural, charitable women's welfare organization situated in Vedaranyam. This orphanage, since then, has continued its services of feeding, sheltering and educating many helpless girl children.

== Legacy ==
The rural women welfare organization that he founded has provided succour to thousands of poor girl children over the years and is fully functional to this day. Many visitors from various countries have paid visits to Gurukulam and have appreciated their services.

Vedaratnam won three elections to be Member of the Legislative Assembly of Madras State, which is now known as Tamil Nadu. All of the compensation that he earned in this position, he donated to Shri Ramakrishna Mission. He also served as the lone Secretary for the Tanjore District Congress Committee for ten years.
