= Kherwadi Social Welfare Association =

- Founded: 1928
- Founder: Late Shri. B.G. Kher
- Type: Community Service
- Purpose: Rural Development & Upliftment of underprivileged youth
- Location: Mumbai, India
- Website: www.yuvaparivartan.org

Kherwadi Social Welfare Association commonly abbreviated as KSWA is a nonprofit organization in India. KSWA aims to restore Upliftment of underprivileged youth in India. The organization was established in 1928. Yuva Parivartan offers different vocational training Programs for the underprivileged youth. This movement was started to help the unmotivated school dropouts to become economically independent by imparting livelihood skills to them.

The Kherwadi Social Welfare Association was founded in 1928 by Late Shri. B.G. Kher.Balasaheb Gangadhar Kher (also known as B. G. Kher) (Marathi: बाळासाहेब गंगाधर खेर) (August 24, 1888 - March 8, 1957, was the first chief minister (then called prime minister) of Bombay State which consisted of Maharashtra and Gujarat States of India. He was awarded by Padma Vibhushan, in the year 1954. KSWA was started BY Mr. B. G. Kher with the aim of improving the living conditions of the 100 odd families who had settled in the marshes of Bandra East.

In the year 1998 Mr. Kishor Kher and Mrs. Mrinalini Kher took over the KSWA's operational activities. KSWA started the Yuva Parivartan movement. This movement was started to guide the unmotivated school dropouts and to become economically independent by imparting livelihood skills to them. In the year 2003 the movement was formally launched by the then President of India A. P. J. Abdul Kalam. The main objective of Yuva Parivartan was to mobilize youth and provide livelihood training to enable more number of youth to become financially independent and lead a productive life.

== History ==
Since KSWA's Founder was an active Gandhian, the early years were focused on Community Welfare through education, health care and income generation along with the development of Bandra East from a marsh in Mahim Creek. Establishment of roads, electricity, water supply and other amenities such as a school handed to BMC in the ‘30s and the first Leather Institute which is today’s Govt. Polytechnic of Bandra East. Late Shri. B. G. Kher and his colleagues also initiated the distribution of individual plots for the residents to ameliorate their miserable living conditions now known as the “Kherwadi Scheme”. He wanted to give the residents a clean community atmosphere with the “Parishramalaya” as its own Community Center where women and youth would come to learn a trade and earn a living. KSWA received a grant of land in Bandra East to conduct its Livelihoods Programs under the aegis of the Khadi and Village Industries Commission

KSWA continue its Founding Fathers through the “Yuva Parivartan” (YP) Project which was started at the Parishramalaya center in 1998 and has now spread to the whole of Maharashtra with over 70 Centers and in four States. KSWA has set an objective to reach out to underprivileged out-of-school youth a segment..

== Yuva Parivartan ==
Yuva Parivartan means transformation of youth. The YP Movement brings the unmotivated school dropouts from the underprivileged background and gives them a direction to lead economically independent lives through vocational training. The movement was set up to help these school-dropouts enrolled in short term vocational training courses. The youth are motivated to learn a skill of their interest leading to income generation and economic independence by placement in small or medium enterprises. The movement works through Vocational Training, Community Engagement and Placement and Partnership with Government, NGOs and Community Based Organizations (CBOs)

- Livelihood Training
- Community Engagement
- Placement Support
- Industry partnership

=== Rural outreach ===
In 2008, the YP Movement formalized its Rural Programs by purchasing a building at Wada in the tribal belt of Thane District with sponsorship from the Tobaccowala family. The one storey structure of 4500 sq. ft. area has been named “Anvarali Tobaccowala Vocational Training Centers”. It is divided into two parts of 1500 sq. ft. each and a residential facility of the same size.

The Blue Star Vocational Training Center sponsored by Blue Star Ltd. runs 14 courses for mainly tribal girls & boys; Larsen & Toubro Charitable Foundation has sponsored the masonry course.

The IRDP Programs sponsored by the Syngenta Foundation and Bombay Gowrakshak Society has 4 main objectives which KSWA has started implementing in 25 villages of Wada Taluka through a team of agricultural graduates. They have also appointed a team of 40 Krishi Pashu Sathis (KPS) one in each village who are KSWA's representatives and facilitators.

The main objective of IRDP is to increase rural incomes through:

- Improved agriculture practices
- Water Resource Management
- Livestock Management
- Women Empowerment through Self-help group (SHG)

=== Role of Yuva Parivartan ===
India has the largest population in the world at 1.48 billion, and with one of the fastest growing economies in the world with an annual Gross Domestic Product (GDP) growth rate of 7-8%. The National Skills Development Corporation (NSDC) has projected an incremental workforce shortage of 244 million workers by 2022, with a 13 million shortage on an annual basis. YP began focusing on vocational training 14 years ago and established programs for underprivileged dropouts and individuals with limited formal education. The organisation develops customized skill development training intended to address these labour shortages in the country.

=== Support from people ===
Management people collect Donations from sponsors to run the NGO for School drop out & deprived youth.

=== Operations ===
Yuva Parivartan is tied up with Axis Bank to take Skill Development & Training to Vidarbha & Marathwada Regions of Maharashtra which covers 19 districts and is known for the maximum Farmers' suicides in India due to continual droughts and failure of crops. KSWA started a main Center in the city of Nagpur and Aurangabad, which was opened in December 2010. These Model Centers are serving as Training Centers for partners in these areas where KSWA opened 66 Centers. Year ending March 31, 2011, KSWA had 28 Centers spread over seven districts of Maharashtra, mainly Mumbai, Pune, Raigad, Thane & Nashik and Centers in Nagpur, Aurangabad, Chandrapur and Wardha District.

- YP was one of the five selected NGO's of Mumbai selected by Impact International Consulting Firm from the U.K. to participate in the CSR Initiative of Thomson Reuters International. Six young future leaders were selected from the UK, U.S., Thailand, Philippines and India to carry out and complete a project for us – Upgrade the Website and use IT Technology for Marketing & PR of the work of YP to raise funds and build partnerships.

== The Integrated Rural Development Programs (IRDP) ==
The Integrated Rural Development Programs (IRDP) is an initiative of KSWA which has a Pilot Project among 25 villages of Wada Taluka of Thane Dist. and seeks to increase farm incomes among subsistence level Marginal Farmers and Tribals to enable them to live a life of dignity and reduce the migration of youth to urban areas. Currently, the Project team consists of 4+1 Agriculture Assistants + In charge, 2+1 Livestock Assistants + 1 Veterinary Doctor, 25 Krishi Pashu Sathis (KPS) one in each of 25 project villages and a Project Consultant- Dr. Khanwilkar, a retired Director of Agriculture Extension Services Konkan Krishi Vidyapeeth. The Project has currently been functioning through KSWA's “Anwarali Tobaccowala Vocation Training Center” in Wada Town.

=== Certifications ===
KSWA is certified by Guide Star India, Give India, Credibility Alliance and have an ISO 9001:2008. Also has the FCRA, 80 G. and 35AC Certifications of the Govt. of India.
