= Vedaranyam March =

1930 civil disobedience in India

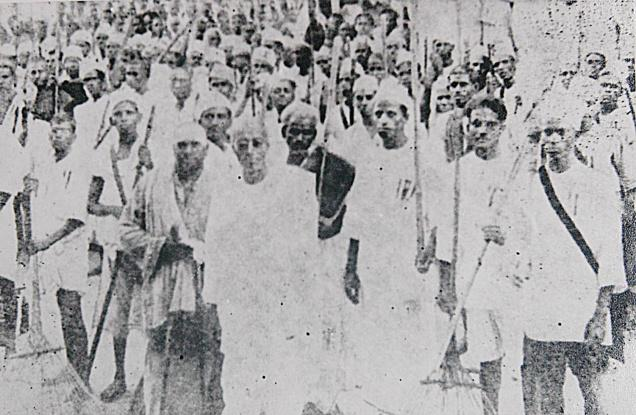
C. Rajagopalachari leading the march along with the volunteers.

The Vedaranyam March (also called the Vedaranyam Satyagraha) was a framework of the nonviolent civil disobedience movement in British India. Modeled on the lines of Dandi March, which was led by Mahatma Gandhi on the western coast of India the month before, it was organised to protest the salt tax imposed by the British Raj in the colonial India.

C. Rajagopalachari, a close associate of Gandhi, led the march which had close to 150 volunteers, most of whom belonged to the Indian National Congress. It began at Trichinopoly (now Tiruchirappalli) on 13 April 1930 and proceeded for about 150 mi (240 km) towards the east before culminating at Vedaranyam, a small coastal town in the then Tanjore District. By collecting salt directly from the sea the marchers broke the salt law. As a part of the march, Rajagopalachari created awareness among the people by highlighting the importance of Khadi as well as social issues like caste discrimination. The campaign came to an end on 28 April 1930 when the participants were arrested by the colonial police force. Its leader Rajagopalachari was imprisoned for six months. The march along with the ones at Dandi and Dharasana drew worldwide attention to the Indian independence movement.

== Background ==
In response to a nationwide protest of the British salt tax, Mahatma Gandhi decided to initiate a march to Dandi—then a small village in the Bombay Presidency—on the western coast of India. When Gandhi's choice of salt was not welcomed by his peers, C. Rajagopalachari ably supported the idea and took part in the Salt March, which was organised on 12 March 1930.

A month later, Rajagopalachari was unanimously elected as the president of the Tamil Nadu Congress Committee (TNCC) at the conference held in Vellore. T. S. S. Rajan was elected as the secretary, while Panthulu Iyer, Swaminatha Chetty, Lakshmipathi, A. Vaidyanatha Iyer and N. S. Varathachariyar were among the prominent members of the committee. In the meanwhile, the party headquarters was shifted from Madras to Trichinopoly. A month later, Rajagopalachari intended to initiate a protest—on the lines of Dandi March—on the eastern coast to make salt at Vedaranyam, Tanjore District, Madras Presidency. Rajaji initially thought of choosing Kanyakumari, the point where the Arabian Sea, the Bay of Bengal and the Indian Ocean confluence with each other. Since the TNCC had decided not to conduct Satyagraha in non-native states, Kanyakumari, which was then a part of the princely state of Travancore, was ruled out. Vedaratnam Pillai, an active congressman and a resident of Vedaranyam, convinced Rajaji that his hometown be the preferred destination. Rajaji agreed with his idea as there were "convenient" salt marshes at the Agasthiampalli salt factory, which was located near Vedaranyam. Further, Pillai was also a licensee of the salt factory and had knowledge about the manufacturing of salt. Further, Rajaji was influenced by the location of the town; it was a part of the Tanjore District, which was a Congress stronghold.

== The march ==
As soon as the venue was finalised, Rajaji made further preparations for the march. A Government record pointed out that he was very much concerned about modelling the march on the lines of Gandhi's Dandi March. He estimated that a minimum sum of ₹20,000 was needed to organise the rally. He successfully managed to collect the funds with the help of Saurashtrians of Madurai and South Indians in Bombay and Ahmedabad. Rajaji had formulated an advance guard that consisted of T. S. S. Rajan, G. Ramachandran and Thiruvannamalai N. Annamalai Pillai. Even before the march took off, the guard travelled along the proposed route and met the villagers to ensure support from them. Rajan was in charge of fixing the halt points for the march and took care of food and accommodation at each stage. The promulgation of section 157 of the Indian Penal Code made it a difficult task for Rajan. J. A. Thorne, the district collector of Tanjore, issued a warning that those who provide food and accommodation to the marchers shall be punished. He tried his best by widely publicising his order throughout his jurisdiction.

The committee had received nearly 1000 applications for participating in the march. After scrutinising the applications, Rajaji selected a team of ninety-eight volunteers, most of them being young clerks, students and graduates. Out of the first batch, twenty-four were from Madurai, fifteen from Tirunelveli, twelve from Ramanathapuram, eleven from Madras, nine from Tiruchengodu, nine from Bombay, seven from Tanjore, five from Trichinopoly, four from Coimbatore and one each from North Arcot and Srirangam. Other prominent members included, Rukmini Lakshmipathi, K. Kamaraj, Aranthangi C. Krishnaswamy, M. Bhaktavatsalam and Rajaji's son, C. R. Narasimhan. In addition, social activists like Vaidyanatha Iyer and G. Ramachandran joined the rally.

The march commenced on 13 April 1930, coinciding with the Puthandu (Tamil New Year), from Rajan's house in Trichinopoly Cantonment. As soon as the marchers reached Tanjore, Rajaji avoided the usual route to Vedaranyam, and instead chose a "circuitous" route via Kumbakonam, Valangaiman, Semmangudi, Needamangalam and Thiruthuraipoondi as he hoped that the marchers would receive hospitality in these places. He had organised fifteen sub committees to ensure a smooth functioning of the march. The idea was to gather enough support among the people by drawing their attention. They planned to cover a stretch of 10 miles each day for a period of about 15 days, thus reaching the destination before the stipulated time.

The Madras Government took a series of measures to bring an end to the march. It ordered the district officers to organize public meetings to persuade people upon the "impracticability" of the march and issued orders to arrest the participants of the march. Other preventive measures included, censoring news items related to the march and taking actions against the editors of the nationalist newspapers. Parents were warned not to send their children to participate in the satyagraha. The telegrams of the volunteers were confiscated, and the Government servants were cautioned about the consequences of participating in the march.

=== Commencement of the march ===
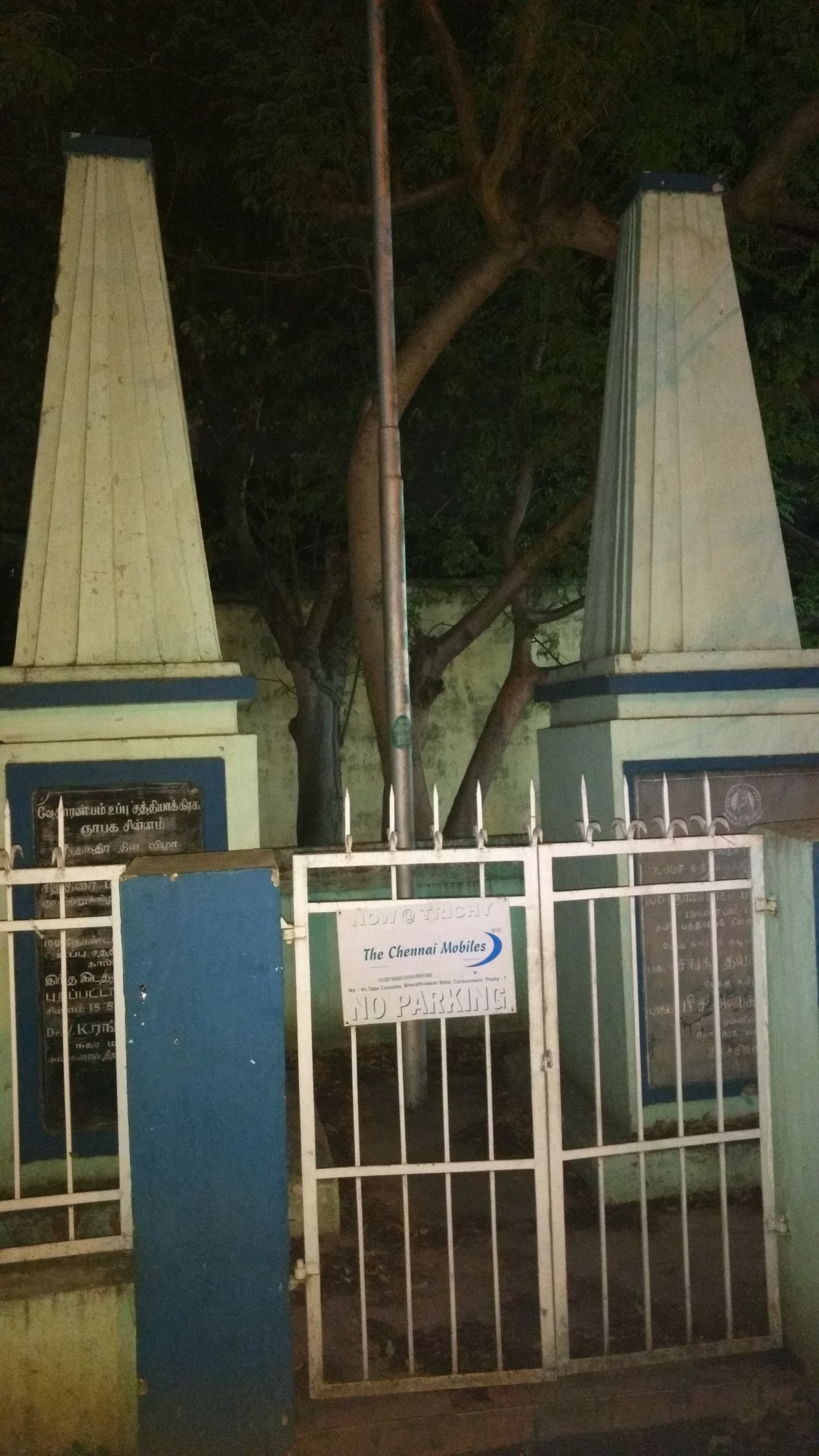
A remembrance to mark the spot in Tiruchirappalli Cantonment, from where the march had begun.

The 98 volunteers assembled at Rajan's house in Trichinopoly on 12 April 1930, while Rajaji reached the venue on the previous day from Tuticorin. All of them stayed at Rajan's Bungalow in Tiruchirappalli Cantonment. At about 5 a.m. on the next day morning, Rajaji, who was 51 at the time, began the march along with the volunteers and headed for Vedaranyam. The marchers sang the hymn "Ragupathi Raagava Rajaram" and a Tamil song which was composed by Namakkal Ramalingam Pillai for the march.

Right from the beginning of the march, the volunteers faced many disruptions. When they reached Koviladi, a small village on the banks of Kaveri, they were denied accommodation at a famous inn. However, they found alternative accommodation on the banks of the river, while Rajaji stayed at a private house. Rajaji also had a code of conduct for the volunteers under which consumption of coffee and tobacco products, and smoking were prohibited.

As the marchers proceeded towards Tanjore District, its "astute and energetic" Collector J. A. Thorne (ICS) found ways to prevent them from proceeding further. Using newspapers, leaflets (printed in Tamil), town-criers and press, Thorne informed the would-be hosts that anyone offering food or shelter to the marchers was liable to six-months of imprisonment and fine. When Rajagopalachari learned of the collector's order, he said that he could understand the mindset of his own people better than a British ICS officer could and remarked, "Thorne and thistles cannot stem this tide of freedom." Panthulu Iyer, an ex-member of the Legislative Council and a resident of Kumbakonam, ignored Thorne's order and provided accommodation for the marchers for two days and arranged a grand dinner for them at his house. He was arrested and sentenced to six months of imprisonment. A few government servants who welcomed the marchers at Semmangudi lost their jobs.

On 25 April, the marchers reached Tiruthuraipoondi and had planned to stay at a choultry which was managed by Ramachandra Naidu, a close associate of Pillai. Despite the collector's warning, Naidu provided accommodation to the marchers at his choultry. His actions led to him being arrested by the police the following day. The arrest of Iyer and Naidu frightened the people. Pillai, however, convinced the people that they could provide food without being caught by the police. As a result, food packets were found tied to the branches of roadside trees, and when the group rested on the banks of Kaveri there were indicators where huge food containers were buried. The policemen, who were deployed to suppress the marchers, suffered from starvation when local residents refused them food and water. The Indian staff who were employed by the British stopped performing their daily activities, while barbers and washermen refused to serve the government employees.

During the march, Rajagopalachari and the marchers highlighted the importance of Civil Disobedience Movement as well as khadi and social issues like caste discrimination. They socialised with the untouchables and refrained from entering the temples in which the former were denied entry. They also swept the streets of the villages and spoke up for the unity of Hindus and Muslims.

=== Defiance of salt laws ===
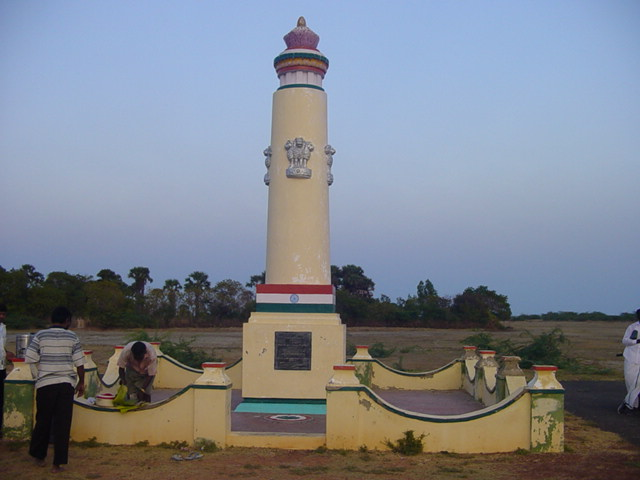
The memorial at Vedaranyam

Despite numerous obstacles, the group reached Vedaranyam on 28 April 1930, 15 days after setting out. When Gandhi was informed he wrote back: "It is good that our hands and feet are tied so that we can sing with joy. God is the help of the helpless." The police, despite their previous failures, tightened the security at Vedaranyam to prevent the marchers from collecting salt. As soon as the group reached Vedaranyam, Rajagopalachari called for more participants and publicly declared that the salt laws would be broken on 30 April. Pillai offered accommodation to the group by constructing a camp on the shore. On the same day, when Rajaji and 16 others moved to the Edanthevar salt swamp, which was about 2 miles (3.2 km) from the camp. A police force led by the District Superintendent arrived at the spot and asked the group to surrender. When they refused, Rajagopalachari was arrested under section 74 of the Salt Act, and was produced before the district magistrate Ponnusamy Pillai. He was sentenced to six-months of imprisonment and was sent to the Trichinopoly Central Prison.

== Aftermath ==
The following day, shops all over the province remained closed. Despite repeated arrests and the use of brutal force by the police, people continued to make salt at Vedaranyam. The collector, Thorne, who at first had been confident of his ability to prevent the march, was forced to report to his superiors: "If there ever existed a fervid sense of devotion to the (British) Government, it is now the defunct". Despite repeated arrests, people continued to make salt and Thorne ordered the police to lathi charge the crowd. Eventually he ordered a "wholesale" arrest, which led to 375 people in the district being arrested for protesting against the British. Rukmini Lakshmipathi, who was imprisoned for one year, became the first woman to serve a jail term for participating in the Salt Satyagraha movement. Kamaraj was arrested for exhorting 300 people to volunteer the march and inciting them to prepare salt. Since he did not refute the charges, he was sentenced to two years of rigorous imprisonment. At first, he was sent to the Trichinopoly before being transferred to the Bellary Central Jail.

As a result of the Gandhi Irwin Pact—signed on 5 March 1931—the Congress suspended the Civil Disobedience Movement and the British, in turn, released all the prisoners. Kamaraj was released eight days later.

The march played a significant role in the political career of Pillai. In 1931, he was conferred with the title of "Sardar" at the Tamil Nadu Agriculturists and Labourers Conference held at Tirunelveli for his active role in the march.

== Re-enactment in 2015 ==
Celebrating the 85th anniversary of the iconic march, the great grandson of Rajaji, C. R. Kesavan, and the grandson of the Sardar, A.Vedaratnam, along with volunteers held a march from Vedaranyam to Agasthiyampalli in 2015.
