= Rajagopalan Krishnamurthy =

Indian cotton researcher (born 1928)

- Born: March 27, 1928
- Known for: 43 cotton hybrids including Suvin & LRA 5166
- Awards: ABLE Award, for excellence in Agriculture Sciences (2007). * Honorary Fellowship to Sri. R. Krishnamourthy, by ISCI on 16 June (2007)
- Scientific career
- Fields: Cotton breeder

Rajagopalan Krishnamurthy (born 27 March 1928) is an Indian cotton researcher. He is a prolific Indian plant breeder who introduced a myriad of cotton varieties for commercial cultivation. He served in the Department of Agriculture of Tamil Nadu for one decade and almost 28 years in Indian Council of Agricultural Research (ICAR). He has released as many as 6 varieties from G. Hirsutum, two from G. Barbadense and three hybrids during his tenure in ICAR Service. All of them are prominent and accepted by the farmers as well as the textile mills at Tamil Nadu and elsewhere. He completed B. Sc.(Agri.) and M. Sc. (Agri.) in plant breeding and genetics from Tamil Nadu Agricultural University, Coimbatore. He is also the Research Director - Cotton of Rasi Seeds Pvt. Ltd.

== Famous varieties ==
=== Suvin cotton ===
Suvin is the Jewel in the Indian cotton crown. The king of cotton and India's pride. “Suvin” variety was released in 1979 by cross breeding Sujatha (Indian cotton variety) with St. Vincent (Sea-Island cotton variety). Suvin is the finest cotton being produced in India and has no parallel and alternative in the world today. It is the only commercially available fiber in the world with spinnability up to 240s count. The highest production of Suvin was 36,000 bales (170 kg), achieved in the year 1989-90. However, the production of Suvin has depleted steadily over the years and currently stands at 300 MT i.e. around 1250 bales.

=== Other varieties ===
Other varieties include b

- MCU-5 (VT) in 1982
- LRA-5166
- LRK-516
- Surabhi
- Sujata

== Hybrids developed in the private sector ==
- Responsible for developing and releasing 43 cotton hybrids.
- Under the Bt cotton Programme, involving Bollgard-1 and Bolgard-2 genes, 14 Bt cotton hybrids have been released for the North, Central and South zones of India & Bt hybrids have been released through other cotton seed companies in the country.

3. 20 Bt cotton hybrids are at advanced stages of testing, while 6 Bt hybrids are awaiting approval for commercial release. During 2007, 9 Bt hybrids were proposed for RGGM trial all over the country.

== Awards and accolades ==
- Rafi Ahmed Khidwai Memorial prize, for the biennium 1966–67 for outstanding contribution in the field of Plant Breeding (December, 1973)ICAR Award for Team Research in Agriculture for the biennium 1975–76, for significant contributions to Cotton Improvement (January, 1976), The Indian Merchant Chamber Award for the year 1974, for the outstanding contribution in the field of Agriculture (February, 1976) Award by the Federation of Indian Chamber of Commerce and Industry, New Delhi for outstanding contribution in the area of life sciences including agriculture (1977)SIMA Cotton Development and Research Association, Coimbatore, for excellence in Cotton Development and for outstanding contribution for the development and releasing of high yielding medium staple Cotton variety, LRA-5166. (1988), Rao Bahaddur Ramanath Iyer Award, 1990–91, by ISCI, Mumbai. For outstanding contribution in the field of Cotton Breeding and Genetics. (1992)
- ABLE Award, for excellence in Agriculture Sciences (2007).
- Honorary Fellowship to Sri. R. Krishnamourthy, by ISCI on 16 June 2007.
- Sri. Krishnamourthy has been continuously involved in Cotton research for more than 5 decades and whose Research output has been commercialized extensively. Cotton hybrids developed by him have benefited the nearly 1 to 1.5 million farming community, during the Non-Bt cotton days and 1.5 to 2 million farmers during the introduction of Biotech Cottons, in India. The cottons have impressive yield advantage compared to other hybrids and accomplished a peak coverage of 21,200 km^{2} during 1997–98 and 2,760,000 acres (11,200 km^{2}) during 2006—07. The sizable coverage led to an additional cotton production of 3,000,000 bales in the country, which accounts for approximately 30% of cotton production.
- Out of the 62 Bt cotton hybrids approved by the Regulatory Authority for Commercialization in India, 21 Bt cotton hybrids have been developed by Sri. Krishnamourthy, under the Rasi Seeds banner. Constituting 33.9% of the total Bt cotton hybrids released for commercialization, they occupy 29% of the hybrid cotton area in India.
- Rasi seeds have bagged, “DSIR National Award for R&D efforts in Industry (2005) in the commercialization of Technologies Acquired from others.”
- ISCI Awards, published on June 16, 2007, by the Journal of ISCI, Matunga, Mumbai – 400 019.

== Publications ==
He has published over 35 research papers in journals of high repute.

- Krishnamurthy, R Breeding for Fibre Quality Improvement of Cotton (2007)
