= R. Umanath =

Indian politician (1921-2014)

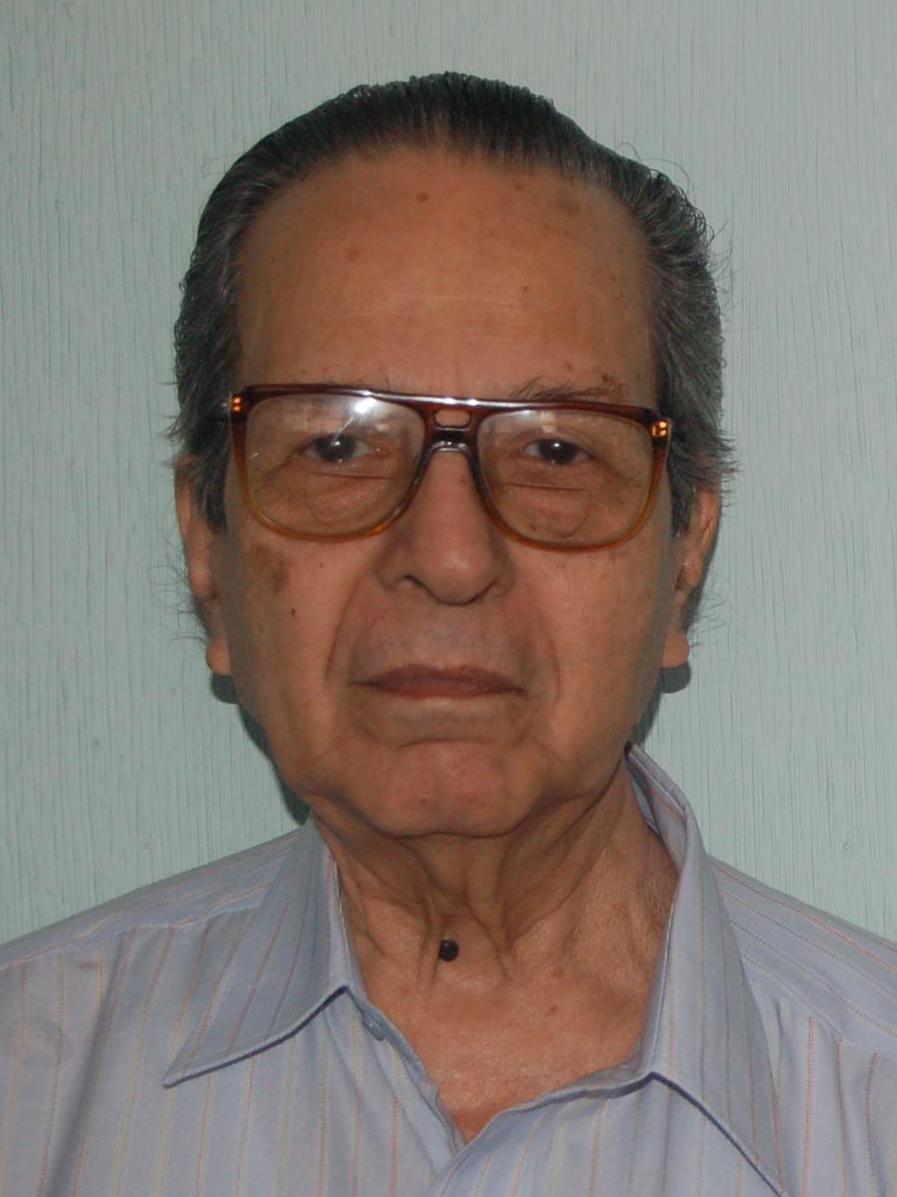

Personal details
- Born: 21 December 1921 Kasaragod, South Canara, Madras Presidency, British India
- Died: 21 May 2014 (aged 92) Tiruchirappalli, Tamil Nadu
- Party: Communist Party of India (Marxist)
- Spouse: Pappa Umanath
- Children: U. Vasuki

R. Umanath (21 December 1921 – 21 May 2014) was a communist politician from Tamil Nadu, India, and a Politburo member of Communist Party of India (Marxist) from 1998. He was born in 1921 in Kasaragod, Kerala and moved to Madras during his student days.

== Early days ==
Born in a poor Brahmin family in Kasaragod, Umanath learnt to play harmonium to accompany his mother who eked out a livelihood as a Bhajan singer. While his family had hoped that Umanath, a student of Annamalai University, would land in a good job, he disappointed them by quitting his studies to become a full-time member of the Communist party.

He joined the Communist Party of India in 1939 while studying at the Annamalai University in Tamil Nadu. He left his studies to become a whole-timer of the Party.

Umanath was arrested along with P. Ramamurthi in 1940 in connection with the Madras Conspiracy Case, and jailed for three years. He spent nine and a half years in jail, and another seven years underground.

== Role in Parliamentary politics ==
He was elected to the 3rd and 4th Lok Sabhas from the Pudukkottai in 1962 and 1967. He was elected to the Tamil Nadu legislative assembly as a Communist Party of India (Marxist) candidate from Nagapattinam in 1977 and 1980 elections.

== Stalwart in Communist Party ==
A trade union leader for many years, Umanath is a former vice-president of the Centre of Indian Trade Unions. He was one of the founders of the CITU and the first general secretary of the organisation in the State. He remained the President of the state CITU for years. He served as one of the Vice Presidents of the Centre of Indian Trade Unions till 2010.

Umanath was also a Tamil Nadu State Committee secretary of CPI(M). He was firmly opposed to LTTE and Tamil separatism in Sri Lanka. In 1991, he was elected to the Polit Bureau and served in that capacity till 2008. He was a member of the Central Committee of the Party from 1978 to 2012.

He died on 21 May 2014 in Tiruchirappalli.

His wife was the reputed communist leader Pappa Umanath. U. Vasuki, who is also the CPI(M) state secretariat member is his daughter.
