= Bendapudi Venkata Satyanarayana =

Indian doctor, dermatologist

Venkata Satyanarayana
- Born: Bendapudi Venkata Satyanarayana; 30 January 1927; Eluru, West Godavari district, Andhra Pradesh
- Died: 15 August 2005 (aged 78)
- Education: Andhra Medical College, Visakhapatnam
- Occupation: dermatologist

Dr. Bendapudi Venkata Satyanarayana (30 January 1927 – 15 August 2005) was an Indian dermatologist who was known as 'the doyen of dermatology' in Andhra Pradesh, India.

== Publications ==
- Ratnam A.V, Brahmayya Sastry P, Satyanarayana B.V. : Ascorbic acid and melanogenesis, British Journal of Dermatology, 97 (2), 201–204, 2006.
