= Vedaranyam =

Vedaranayam
- Town
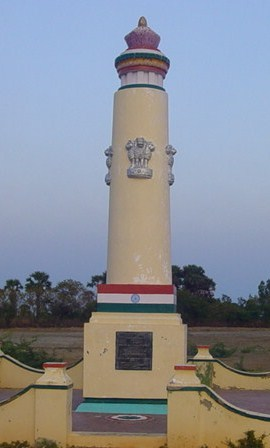
- Salt Sathyagraga Memorial Stupa – a memorial of the historic salt march carried out in Vedaranyam in 1930

- Vedaranyam, Tamil Nadu
- Coordinates: 10°22′38.6″N 79°50′58.2″E
- Country: India
- State: Tamil Nadu
- District: Nagapattinam

Government
  - Type: Second Grade Municipality
  - Body: Vedaranyam Municipality

Area
  - Total: 36.26 km^{2} (14.00 sq mi)
- Elevation: 29 m (95 ft)

Population (2011)
  - Total: 34,266
  - Density: 945.0/km^{2} (2,448/sq mi)

Languages
  - Official: Tamil
- Time zone: UTC+5:30 (IST)
- PIN: 614810
- Telephone code: 9143695
- Vehicle registration: TN 51 AZ

Vedaranyam (Tamil: [ʋeːdaːɾaɳjam]) (also spelt as Vedaraniam and Vedaranniyam) is a town in Nagapattinam district in the Indian state of Tamil Nadu. The town is named after the presiding deity of the Vedaranyeswarar Temple. The recorded history of Vedaranyam is known from medieval Chola period of the 9th century and has been ruled, at different times, by the Medieval Cholas, Later Cholas, Later Pandyas, Vijayanagar Empire and the British. During India's independence struggle, C. Rajagopalachari, who would later become independent India's first Governor-General, launched a salt march in Vedaranyam parallel to the Dandi March launched by Gandhi in 1930 to protest against the sales tax levied on salt extraction.

Vedaranyam comes under the Vedaranyam assembly constituency which elects a member to the Tamil Nadu Legislative Assembly once every five years and it is a part of the Nagapattinam (Lok Sabha constituency) which elects its Member of Parliament (MP) once in five years. The town is administered by the Vedaranyam municipality, which covers an area of 36.26 km^{2} (14.00 sq mi). As of 2011, the town had a population of 34,266. Vedaranyam was a part of Thanjavur District till 1991 and Nagapattinam District from then on. The town is a part of the fertile Cauvery delta region, but salt extraction and prawn cultivation are the major occupations. Roadways are the major mode of transportation to Vedaranyam and the nearest Airport is Tiruchirapalli Airport, located 135 km (84 mi) away from the town. On 17 November 2018, Vedaranyam was devastated by Cyclone Gaja.

== Etymology and legend ==
Vetharanyam is named after Vedaranyeswarar, the presiding deity of the Vedaranyeswarar Temple, a Hindu temple dedicated to Shiva. The place was earlier known as "Tirumaraikadu", meaning the place where Vedas, oldest scriptures of Hinduism, originated. The 7th century Saiva canonical work Tevaram by Appar and Tirugnanasambandar mentions the place as "Tirumaraikadu". As per Hindu legend, the Vedas worshipped Shiva in this place, giving the name "Vedaranyam" to the place. According to another Hindu legend, Rama, the seventh avatar of god Vishnu, is believed to have visited Vedaranyam to absolve himself from sins committed in the war against the demon king Ravana. The footprints of Rama is preserved in a place called Ramar Padam near Vedaranyam. According to a Tamil legend, the Vedas locked the gates of the temple after worshipping Shiva. The Nayanmars (Saiva saints) Appar and Tirugnanasambandar could not enter the locked temple. At this, on Tirugnanasambandar's request, Appar sang devotional hymns praising Shiva, after which the gates opened. Tirugnanasambandar's devotional hymns locked the gates again.

== History ==
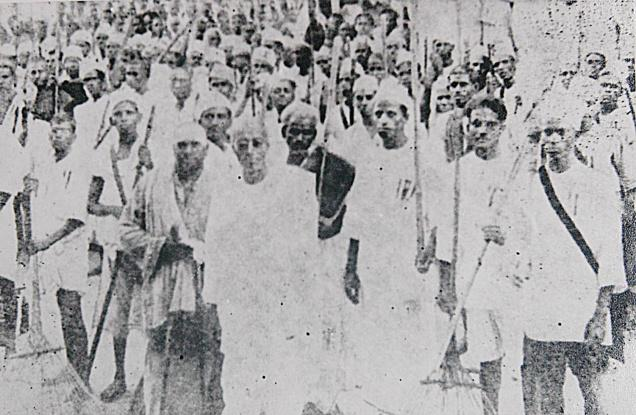
Vedaranyam salt march led by Rajaji

The recorded history of Vedaranyam is found from the inscriptions in Vedaranyeswarar Temple. The inscriptions date from the reign of Aditya Chola (871–907), Rajaraja Chola I (985–1014), Rajendra Chola I (1012–1044) and Kulothunga Chola I (1070–1120) indicating various grants to the temple. Paranjothi Munivar, a 13th-century saint, who wrote the book Thiruvilaiyadal Puranam, was born at Vedaranyam.

Vedaranyam continued to be a part of the Chola Empire and the Chola region emerged as a centre of Saivism during the reign of Kulothunga Chola I (1070–1120). After the fall of Cholas during the reign of Rajendra Chola III in the 13th century, the erstwhile Chola region was caught under a power struggle between Pandyas and Hoysalas. The royal patronage continued to the temple during the rule of the Nayaks. The Negapatam region (modern day Nagapattinam district) was briefly captured by French troops led by Lally (1702–66) in 1759. The Tanjore district was annexed by British after the French failed to subdue the king of Tanjore. During the British period, Vedaranyam was part of Thiruthuraipoondi Taluk under Tanjore district. Salt from Vedaranyam was transported to Nagapttinam port through a 32 mi (51 km) long canal. The channel was constructed in 1869 because road transportation facilities between these two towns were limited.

During India's independence struggle, Gandhi launched the Dandi March along India's west coast to protest against the sales tax levied on salt extraction. His close associate C. Rajagopalachari, who would later become independent India's first Governor-General, carried out a salt march in parallel, on the east coast starting from Trichonopoly (modern day Tiruchirappalli) to Vedaranyam. His group, having people like Sardar Vedaratnam, started from Tiruchirappalli, in Madras Presidency (now part of Tamil Nadu), to the coast of the town. After making illegal salt there on 30 April 1930, the group was arrested by the British. After India's independence, Vedaranyam continued to be a part of Thanjavur district until 1991, and later became part of the newly created Nagapattinam district.

== Geography ==
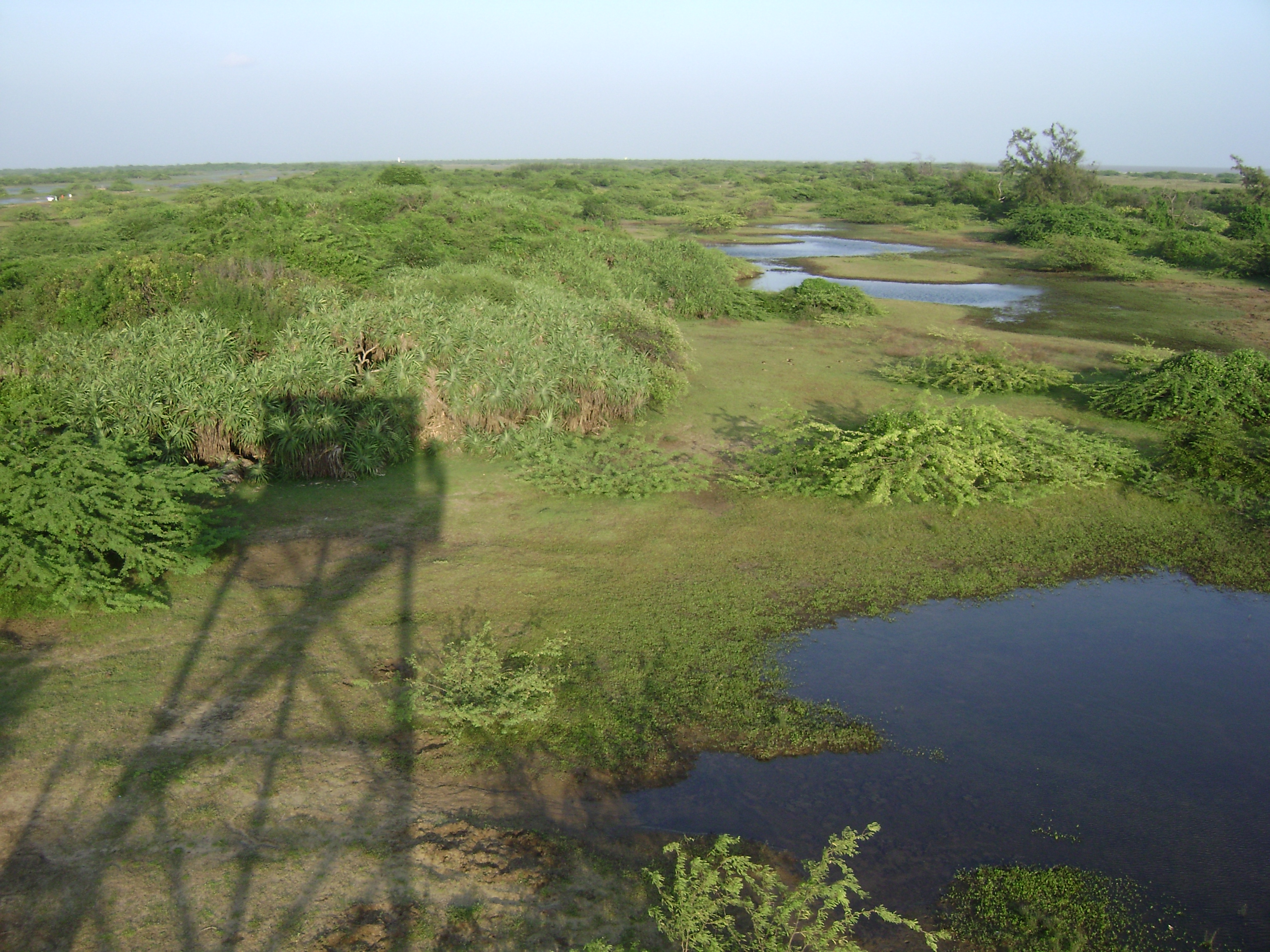
Kodikarai wildlife sanctuary is located in the eastern portion of the Great Vedaranyam Swamp which is connected to the Cauvery river by five freshwater channels.

Vedaranyam has an average elevation of 1 m (3.3 ft) and is located on the Coramandel coast of Bay of Bengal. The Vedaranyam swamp is located parallel to the Palk Strait for 48 km (30 mi). The river Cauvery was flowing south easterly direction from Trichy and had its confluence at Vedaranyam due to the emergence of Vedaranyam nose (the nose shaped stretch from Vedaranyam to Kodiyakarai) during the pleistocene period. Due to the rise of tertiary rocks in the Pattukottai – Mannargudi region and also due to the increase of sediments in the Vedaranyam area, the river migrated northwards. There is lesser marine activity in the Vedaranyam shore due to the presence of Vedaranyam nose in the north and Sri Lanka in the south, both causing weak shore currents.

The quality of ground water is poor compared to the northern shores of Tamil Nadu due to the presence of marine and semi-marine origin in sediments. The images from the satellite IRS 1A shows Thiruthuraipoondi was a coastal town^{b} (which is an inland in modern times) and the sea has regressed up to Vedaranyam in modern times. The analysis of backwaters from 1932 to 1992 indicates considerable enlargement in the region and occurrence of number of sand bodies.

Modern day Vedaranyam has five fresh water channels from river Cauvery draining into the swamp. The total area of the swamp is about 349 km^{2} (135 sq mi), with 10 km (6.2 mi) width in the northwestern part and 6 km (3.7 mi) width in the western side. The Kodikarai wildlife reserve is located in the extreme eastern portion of the swamp. The northern tip of the swamp obtains continuous source of fresh, saline or brackish water during the south west monsoon and dries up during the summer season. The swamp is used for salt extraction and other marine-based industries. The swamps are filled by two periodical high tides that occur during the full moon days of May and June. The swamp along with the sanctuary is the important wintering and staging area for waders and water birds.

Climate data for Vedaranyam (1981–2010, extremes 1960–2012)
Month	Jan	Feb	Mar	Apr	May	Jun	Jul	Aug	Sep	Oct	Nov	Dec	Year
Record high °C (°F)	32.8 (91.0)	36.2 (97.2)	37.2 (99.0)	39.6 (103.3)	39.8 (103.6)	38.6 (101.5)	39.6 (103.3)	38.2 (100.8)	38.0 (100.4)	36.2 (97.2)	34.6 (94.3)	32.9 (91.2)	39.8 (103.6)
Mean daily maximum °C (°F)	29.1 (84.4)	30.4 (86.7)	32.5 (90.5)	34.1 (93.4)	34.6 (94.3)	34.1 (93.4)	33.9 (93.0)	33.7 (92.7)	33.1 (91.6)	31.7 (89.1)	29.8 (85.6)	29.0 (84.2)	32.2 (90.0)
Mean daily minimum °C (°F)	22.0 (71.6)	22.4 (72.3)	23.9 (75.0)	26.0 (78.8)	26.4 (79.5)	26.0 (78.8)	25.1 (77.2)	25.0 (77.0)	24.8 (76.6)	24.0 (75.2)	23.1 (73.6)	22.4 (72.3)	24.3 (75.7)
Record low °C (°F)	15.5 (59.9)	16.2 (61.2)	16.4 (61.5)	19.2 (66.6)	20.0 (68.0)	19.8 (67.6)	18.4 (65.1)	18.1 (64.6)	18.5 (65.3)	18.0 (64.4)	17.0 (62.6)	16.4 (61.5)	15.5 (59.9)
Average rainfall mm (inches)	62.5 (2.46)	38.5 (1.52)	19.0 (0.75)	20.4 (0.80)	60.9 (2.40)	29.6 (1.17)	56.0 (2.20)	63.8 (2.51)	82.3 (3.24)	228.9 (9.01)	470.5 (18.52)	269.2 (10.60)	1,401.7 (55.19)
Average rainy days	2.7	1.4	0.8	1.4	2.7	1.6	3.3	3.4	5.0	11.0	13.3	8.8	55.2
Average relative humidity (%) (at 17:30 IST)	77	77	73	71	70	71	71	71	73	77	81	79	74
Source: India Meteorological Department

== Demographics and economy ==
Religious census
Religion	Percent(%)
Hindu	90.17%
Muslim	8.93%
Christian	0.74%
Jain	0.09%
Other	0.07%

Historical population
Year	Pop.	±%
1961	18,018	—
1971	21,476	+19.2%
1981	26,573	+23.7%
1991	29,835	+12.3%
2001	31,627	+6.0%
2011	34,266	+8.3%
Sources: 1961 – 2001: 2011:

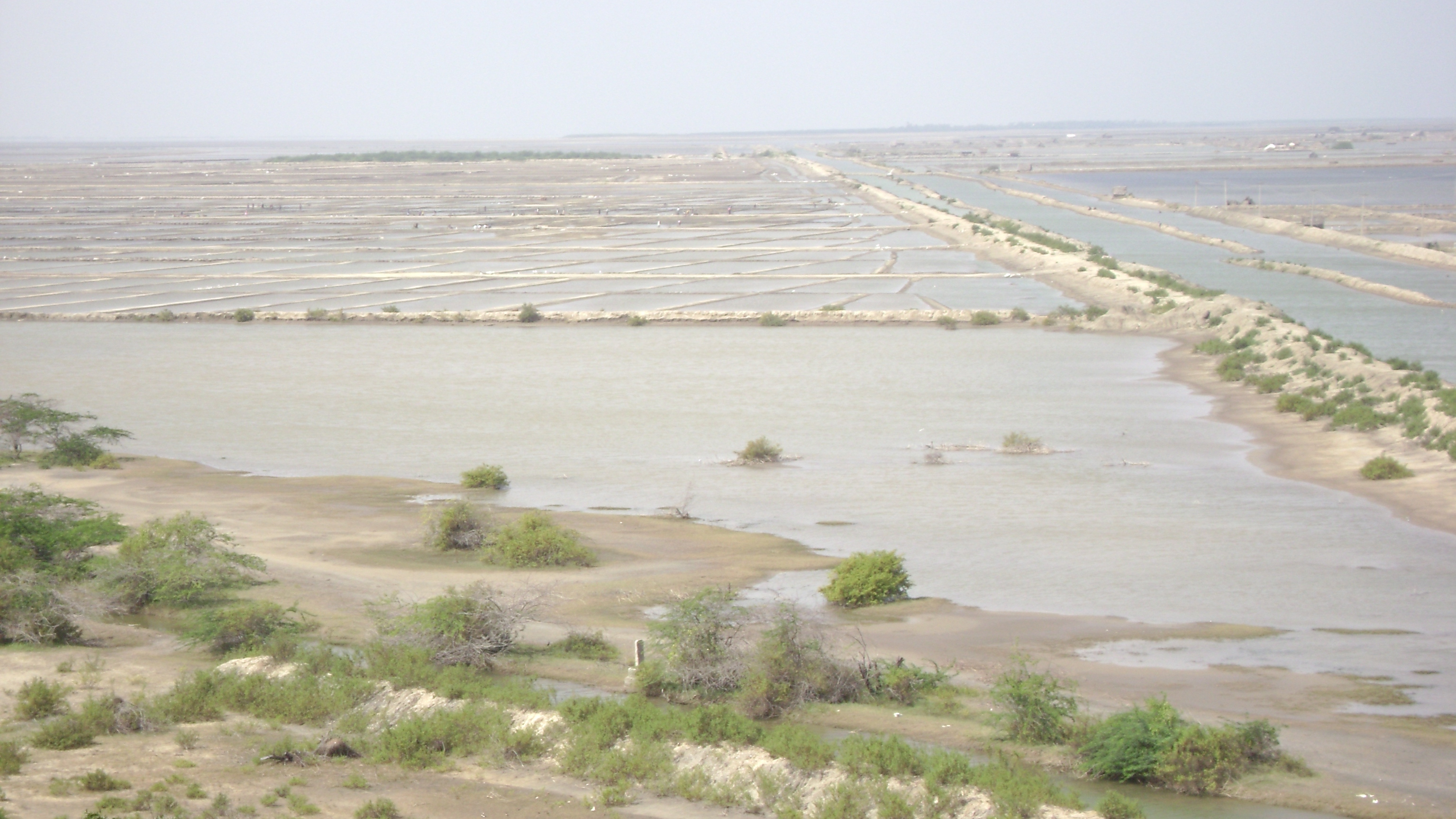
Salt pans – one of the major manufacturing units in Vedarnyam – Kodiyakarai stretch

According to 2011 census, Vedaranyam had a population of 34,266 with a sex-ratio of 1,068 females for every 1,000 males, much above the national average of 929. A total of 3,261 were under the age of six, constituting 1,711 males and 1,550 females. Scheduled Castes and Scheduled Tribes accounted for 14.91% and .2% of the population respectively. The average literacy of the town was 77.86%, compared to the national average of 72.99%. The town had a total of : 8665 households. There were a total of 12,694 workers, comprising 835 cultivators, 912 main agricultural labourers, 98 in house hold industries, 3,440 other workers, 7,409 marginal workers, 421 marginal cultivators, 2,277 marginal agricultural labourers, 175 marginal workers in household industries and 4,536 other marginal workers. As per the religious census of 2011, Vedaranyam had 90.17% Hindus, 8.93% Muslims, 0.74% Christians, 0.09% Jains and 0.07% following other religions.

The primary economic activities of the region are salt-manufacturing, fishing, salt water prawn culture and agriculture. Saltpans (crystallisers) are spread over 11,000 acres (45 km^{2}) along the coastline, including those of small, medium and large salt manufacturers. According to estimates, about 3.5 lakh tonnes of salt is produced annually in the region. The salt industry employs around 20,000 people. Some of the major private companies like Chemplast Sanmar, Vedaranyam Marine Products have salt manufacturing units in Vedaranyam. Salt manufacturing, the traditional occupation of the town, has been overshadowed by prawn cultivation since the 90s. All major nationalized banks such as Indian Bank, Canara Bank and Indian Overseas Bank and private banks like City Union Bank have their branches in Vedaranyam.

== Municipal administration and politics ==
Municipality Officials
Chairman	T.S. Thyagarajan
Commissioner	K. Sundaresan
Elected Members
Member of Legislative Assembly	O. S. Manian
Member of Parliament	Selvaraj

Vedaranyam is administered by a second grade^{a} municipality. It was originally declared a third grade municipality on 28 August 2004 and promoted to a second grade municipality on 9 August 2010. The municipality has 21 wards and there is an elected councillor for each of those wards. The municipality has 3 revenue villages namely Vedaranyam, Thoputhurai and Agasthyanpalli. The functions of the municipality are devolved into five departments: General administration, Engineering, Revenue, Public Health and Town planning. All these departments are under the control of a Municipal Commissioner who is the supreme executive head. The legislative powers are vested in a body of 21 members, one each from the 21 wards. The legislative body is headed by an elected Chairperson assisted by a Deputy Chairperson. The town became part of Nagapattinam district since January 1997 when the Nagapattinam district was created as a separate district.

Vedaranyam comes under the Vedaranyam assembly constituency and it elects a member to the Tamil Nadu Legislative Assembly once every five years. From the 1977 elections, the assembly seat was won by Dravida Munnetra Kazhagam (DMK) five times during 1977, 1984, 1996, 2001 and 2006 elections, Anna Dravida Munnetra Kazhagam (ADMK) three times during 1980, 2011 and 2016 elections and Indian National Congress for two times during 1989 and 1991 elections. The current MLA of the constituency is O. S. Manian from the ADMK party.

Vedaranyam is a part of the Nagapattinam (Lok Sabha constituency) – it has the following six assembly constituencies – Thiruvarur, Nagapattinam, Thiruthuraipoondi, Vedaranyam, Kilvelur (SC) and Nannilam. The current Member of Parliament from the constituency is A.K.S. Vijayan from the DMK. From 1957, the Nagapattinam parliament seat was held by the Indian National Congress for five times during 1957–1961, 1962–67, 1967–71, 1991–96, and 1996–98 elections. CPI won the seat for 5 times during 1971–77, 1977–80, 1989–91, 1996–98 and 1998 elections. DMK won 4 times during 1980–84, 1999–2004, 2004–09 and 2011 elections. ADMK won the seat once during 1984–89.

Law and order in Vedaranyam is maintained by the Nagapattinam sub division of Tamil Nadu Police headed by a Deputy Superintendent. There is one police station in the town. There are special units like prohibition enforcement, district crime, social justice and human rights, district crime records and special branch that operate at the district level police division headed by a Superintendent of Police.

== Landmarks ==
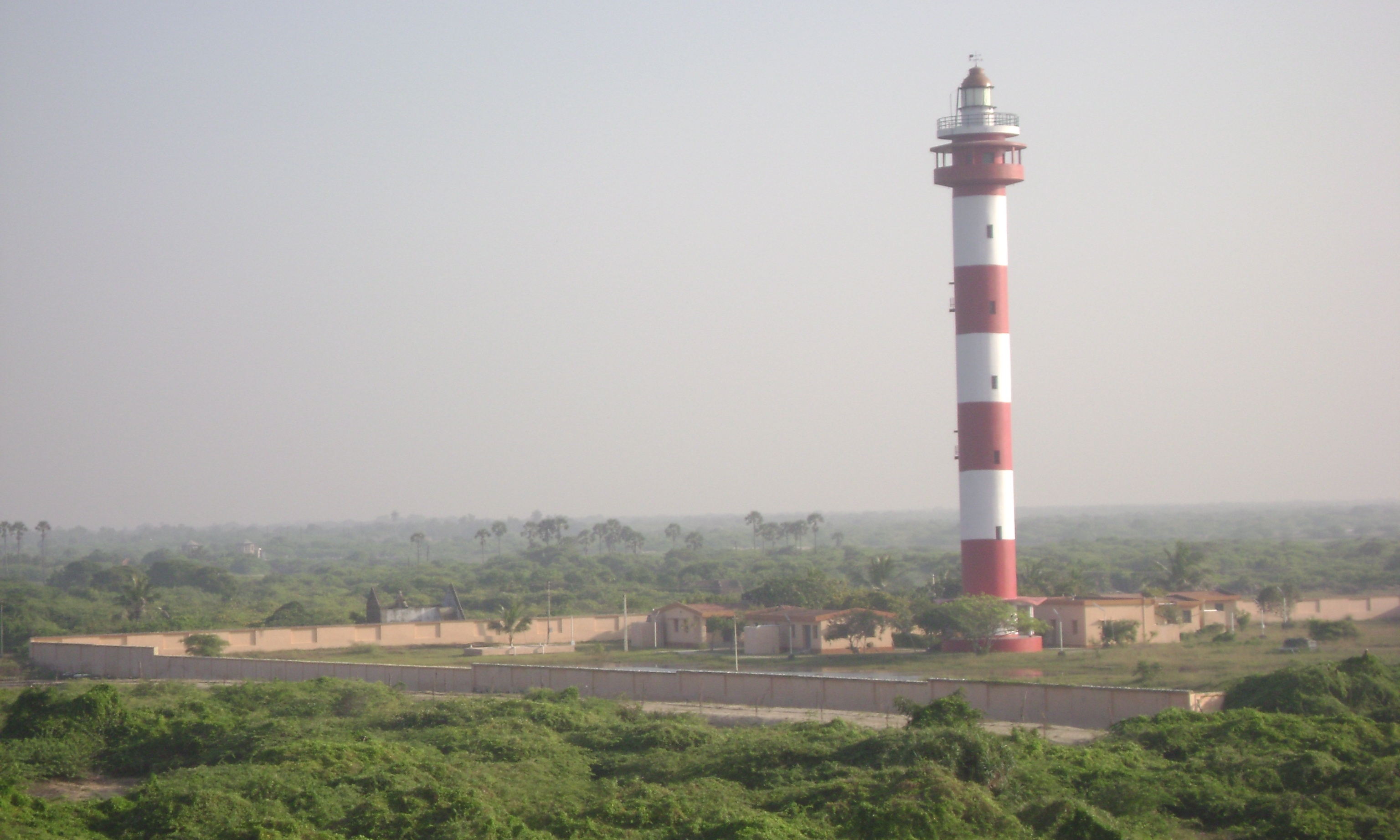
Kodiyakkarai wildlife sanctuary and the lighthouse

The Vedaranyeswarar temple, an ancient Hindu temple dedicated to Shiva, is located in Vedaranyam. The temple has a shrine for Thyagaraja (a form of Shiva), known for "Hamsapthanathaanam", the dance pose similar to the gait of a swan. According to legend, a Chola king named Mucukunta obtained a boon from Indra (a celestial deity) to receive an image of Thyagaraja from the Hindu god Vishnu. Indra tricked the king with six other duplicate images, but the king chose the right image which was later installed at Thyagaraja Temple, Tiruvarur. The remaining six images were installed in Dharbaranyeswarar Temple, Kayarohanaswamy Temple, Kannayariamudayar Temple, Brahmapureeswarar Temple, Vaimoornaathar Temple and Vedaranyeswarar Temple. All seven Thyagaraja images are believed to possess different dance styles and the temples are classified as Saptha Vidangam, meaning temples with the seven dance moves. The twin festivals celebrated during the full moon days of Tamil month Adi (July – August) and Thai (January – February) attract large number of pilgrims from whole of Tamil Nadu. Pilgrims take a holy dip in the seashore round the year and the holy dip is considered similar to the worship practises at Rameswaram.

The Salt Sathyagraga Memorial Stupe built in memory of the salt march during India's independence movement is another prominent landmark in Vedaranyam. The tourist destinations around the town are Ayurvedic Medicinal Forest, Point Calimere Wildlife and Bird Sanctuary located Point Calimere at a distance of 10 km (6.2 mi), Historical Light House, Ramar Paatham, Ettukudi Murugan temple located at a distance of 40 km (25 mi) and Our Lady of Good Health, Velankanni located at a distance of 37 km (23 mi) from the town.

== Transport, education and utility services ==
Vedaranyam municipality accommodates 102.5 km (63.7 mi) of roads: 2.05 km (1.27 mi) of cement roads, 58.85 km (36.57 mi) of bituminous roads, 8.7 km (5.4 mi) of WBM roads and 32.9 km (20.4 mi) of earthen roads. The municipality maintains a bus stand that accommodates local as well as long-distance buses. Bus is the primary mode of public transport from the town. There was a railway branch line connecting Vedaranyam to Mayiladuthurai via Thiruthuraipoondi and ending at Agastiyampalli. The line was opened to passenger traffic on 15 May 1919. The railway line is discontinued and in turn affects the economy of the town. The nearest railway station is located at Thiruthuraipoondi Junction, located 35 km (22 mi) away from the town. The nearest Airport is Tiruchirapalli Airport, located 135 km (84 mi) away from Vedaranyam.

Vedaranyam has three elementary schools, three middle schools, four high schools and three higher secondary schools. The Bharathidasan University started the Bharathidasan University Model College in 2011, the first government college in the town. The college offers arts and science related courses.

Electricity supply to Vedaranyam is regulated and distributed by the Nagapattinam circle of Tamil Nadu Electricity Board (TNEB). Water supply project through the Vedaranyam Municipality is approved by the Commissioner of Municipal Administration, Chennai. Water is obtained from hand pumps and fountains located in various parts of the town. Door to door collection of garbage is done by sanitary workers of the municipality and about 6 metric tonnes of solid waste are collected from the town every day. Vedaranyam municipality does not have underground drainage system and the current sewerage system for disposal of sullage is through septic tanks and public conveniences.

Vedaranyam comes under the Nagapattinam Telecom circle of the Bharat Sanchar Nigam Limited (BSNL), India's state-owned telecom and internet services provider. Apart from telecom, BSNL also provides broadband internet service There is a government hospital and two private hospitals in the town. Rajaji Park and Gandhi Park are the two parks maintained by the municipality.

== Notes ==
=== Footnotes ===
- The municipalities in Tamil Nadu are graded special, selection, grade I and grade II based on income and population. While "grade II" is the official classification, all the municipal websites use "second grade".
- Satellite pictures and carbon dating of some ancient beaches between Thiruthuraipoondi and Kodiyakarai show the Thiruthuraipoondi beach dates back 6,000 years and the Kodiyakarai beach 1,100 years. In other words, the sea was near Thiruthuraipoondi 6,000 years ago and reached Kodiyakarai around 1,100 years ago. Source: Thiruthuraipoondi#Geography.
