= 1867 in India =

- Centuries: 17th; 18th; 19th; 20th; 21st
- Decades: 1840s; 1850s; 1860s; 1870s; 1880s
- See also: List of years in India; Timeline of Indian history

Events in the year 1867 in India.

== Incumbents ==
- Sir John Lawrence, Governor-General of India, 12 January 1864 – 12 January 1869
- Colonel Henry Errington Longden, Adjutant-General of India, January 1866–March 1869
- Lord Napier, Governor of Madras, 1866–1872
- Chhatar Sal Singh II, Maharao of Kota State, 27 March 1866 – 11 June 1889
- Sagramji II Devaji (Sagramji Bhanabhai), Thakur of Gondal State, 1851-14 December 1869
- Bham Pratap Singh, Raja and Maharajah of Bijawar State, 23 November 1847 – 15 September 1899
- Shri Singh, Raja of Chamba State, 1844–1870
- Ranmalsinhji Amarsinhji, Raj Sahib of Dhrangadhra State, 9 April 1843 – 16 October 1869
- Madan Pal, Maharaja of Karauli State, 4 March 1854 – 16 August 1869
- Pratap Singh Deo, Maharajah of Patna, 1866–1878
- Afzal ad-Dawlah, Asaf Jah V, Nizam of Hyderabad, 16 May 1857 – 26 February 1869
- Ram Singh I, Raja of Sitamau State, 1802–1867
- Bhawani Singh, Raja of Sitamau State, 1867-28 May 1885
- Khem Savant IV "Bapu Sahib" Bhonsale, Raja Bahadur of Sawantwadi State, 3 October 1812 – 1867
- Phond Savant IV "Bapu Sahib" Bhonsale, Raja Bahadur of Sawantwadi State, 1867-7 March 1869
- William Reierson Arbuthnot, member of the Madras Legislative Council, 1866–1870

== Events ==
- Hindus in the United Provinces of Agra and Oudh demanded that Hindi be made an official language in place of Urdu.
- Urdu/Hindi Controversy.
- The central government switches from a May–April fiscal year to an April–March one to align with that of the British government.
- British Indian soldiers participate in the British Expedition to Abyssinia from 1867 to 1868
- Jesuits destroy the ruins of the Chudamani Vihara
- British soldiers mounted the Andaman Islands Expedition, landing on Little Andaman on 21 March
- Prarthana Samaj, a movement for religious and social reform in Bombay, was founded
- Administration of the Press and Registration of Books Act, 1867 was passed
- Dadabhai Naoroji established the East India Association, one of the predecessor organisations of the Indian National Congress
- Henry Miers Elliot's The History of India, as Told by Its Own Historians is published in London from 1867 to 1877
- Ohel David Synagogue was constructed in Pune by David Sassoon
- Sassoon Hospital was built in Pune by David Sassoon
- St. Vincent's High School was established in Pune
- Sribati G.K. High School was established
- Balmer Lawrie manufacturing company was founded in Calcutta
- Madras Boat Club, one of the oldest rowing centres in India, was founded
- Balaghat district was constituted
- Buldhana district was constituted
- Ellichpur District was constituted
- Daulatpur Mohsin High School was founded
- Great Indian Peninsula Railway's Allahabad-Jubbulpore branch line was opened in June
- Jogeshwari railway station was opened
- Mahalaxmi railway station was opened
- BB&CI, the first suburban railway, opened

== Law ==
- Murderous Outrages Regulation
- Public Gambling Act of 1867 is passed, prohibiting the running or being in charge of a public gaming house
- Press & Registration Of Books Act
- Portuguese Civil Code
- Oriental Gas Company Act

== Births ==
- Bruce McRae, American stage and early silent film actor, on 15 January
- Champat Rai Jain, founder of the Jain mission in London, is born on 6 August in Delhi
- Harry Bard, secretary of the Pan American Society of the United States, on 27 August
- M. V. Dhurandhar, painter and postcard artist, born in Kolhapur, Maharashtra
- Mahashankar Vishwanath Thaker, Chief Treasurer of the Princely State of Limbdi under Jhala Rajput rule, born in Wadhwan, Gujarat
- Edward Vere Levinge, administrator in the Indian Civil Service who rose to serve as acting Lieutenant-Governor of the British Raj, born on 24 May in Cuttack
- Sankaradas Swamigal, Tamil writer, actor, playwright, songwriter and drama producer, born in Tuticorin
- Maud Diver, English author who wrote novels, short stories, biographies and journalistic pieces, born on 9 September in Murree
- Jain Spiritual Saint, Philosopher and Poet Shrimad RajchandraJi was Born in Vavania, Gujarat on 09thNovember 1967

== Deaths ==
- Ram Singh I, Raja of Sitamau State, 1867
- Khem Savant IV "Bapu Sahib" Bhonsale, Raja Bahadur of Sawantwadi State
