= 1866 in India =

- Centuries: 17th; 18th; 19th; 20th; 21st
- Decades: 1840s; 1850s; 1860s; 1870s; 1880s
- See also: List of years in India; Timeline of Indian history

Events in the year 1866 in India.

== Incumbents ==
- Sir John Lawrence, Governor-General of India, 12 January 1864 – 12 January 1869
- Colonel Edmund Haythorne, Adjutant-General of India, 22 June 1860–January 1866
- Colonel Henry Errington Longden, Adjutant-General of India, January 1866–March 1869
- Lord Napier, Governor of Madras, 1866-1872
- Ram Singh II, Maharao of Kota State, 20 July 1828 – 27 March 1866
- Chhatar Sal Singh II, Maharao of Kota State, 27 March 1866 – 11 June 1889
- Sagramji II Devaji (Sagramji Bhanabhai), Thakur of Gondal State, 1851-14 December 1869
- Bham Pratap Singh, Raja and Maharajah of Bijawar State, 23 November 1847 – 15 September 1899
- Shri Singh, Raja of Chamba State, 1844-1870
- Ranmalsinhji Amarsinhji, Raj Sahib of Dhrangadhra State, 9 April 1843 – 16 October 1869
- Madan Pal, Maharaja of Karauli State, 4 March 1854 – 16 August 1869
- Hiravajra Singh Deo, Maharajah of Patna, 1848-August 1866
- Pratap Singh Deo, Maharajah of Patna, 1866-1878
- Cecil Beadon, Lieutenant-Governor of Bengal, 1862-1866
- Afzal ad-Dawlah, Asaf Jah V, Nizam of Hyderabad, 16 May 1857 – 26 February 1869
- Robert Milman, consecrated bishop of Trichy-Tanjore Diocese of the Church of South India
- Charles Pelly, revenue member of the Madras Legislative Council, 1862-1866
- William Reierson Arbuthnot, member of the Madras Legislative Council, 1866-1870

== Events ==
- East India Association, founded by Dadabhai Naoroji
- 47 million people were affected by the Orissa famine of 1866
- Muhammad Qasim Nanotvi established the Darul Uloom Deoband on 31 May 1866, founding the Deobandi movement
- Nanotvi founded Mazahir Uloom Saharanpur in November
- Khursheed Ali Khan established Jamia-e-Imania on 15 December in Varanasi
- Brahmoism split into the new Sadharan Brahmo Samaj sect
- Allahabad High Court was established as the High Court of Judicature for the North-Western Provinces at Agra on 17 March
- Naga Hills was given district status
- British Indian administration established a post at Samaguting to end intertribal warfare and tribal raids on property and personnel in Nagaland
- Government Victoria College, Palakkad was established in Kerala
- Gossner Theological College Seminary was established in Jharkhand
- St. Mary's Convent Inter College was established in Allahabad, Uttar Pradesh
- Harish Chandra Postgraduate College opened on 1 April in Varanasi district, Uttar Pradesh
- Christ Church College, Kanpur opened in Kanpur as part of the University of Calcutta
- Bankim Chandra Chattopadhyay published Kapalkundala, a Bengali novel
- Nandshankar Tuljashankar Mehta published Karan Ghelo in Gujarati
- Edward John Waring published Pharmacopoeia of India
- Bajaur Scouts were created
- Scinde Dawk stamps, the first adhesive stamps used in Asia, were discontinued in June
- British Raj acquired Dalhousie Cantonment and Bakloh for 5,000 rupees as a convalescent depot for European troops
- Douglas Hamilton published Report on the High Ranges of the Annamullay Mountains in Madras
- Commercial Bank of India of Bombay, founded in 1845, failed in the Panic of 1866
- United Bank of India was established
- Grand Chord and the Howrah–Delhi main line were opened, connecting Delhi and Kolkata while the Kalka Mail entered into service
- Sahibganj loop was opened, connecting Khana Junction and Kiul Junction
- Mughalsarai–Kanpur section was opened, connecting Mughalsarai Junction and Kanpur Central
- Nasik Road railway station was opened in Nashik
- Manmad Junction railway station was opened in Nashik
- Khandwa Junction railway station was opened
- Mathura–Vadodara section was opened
- Barharwa Junction railway station was opened
- Kanpur–Delhi section was opened, connecting Kanpur Central and Delhi
- Mokama–Barauni section, connecting Mokama Junction and Barauni in Bihar
- Ghaziabad railway station opened
- Laksar Junction opened in Laksar, Uttarakhand
- A supplement, the Pioneer Mail, consisting of "48 quarto-size pages", mostly of advertisements, was added to The Pioneer
- HMS Malabar, designed to carry troops between the United Kingdom and British India, is launched on 8 December
- The meteorite Jamkheir fell in Maharashtra on 5 October
- Madurai was constituted as a municipality.
- Coimbatore was constituted as a municipality.
- Machilipatnam Municipal Corporation was constituted as a municipality
- Kumbakonam was constituted as a municipality
- Indian soldiers were first allowed promotions beyond subedar

== Law ==
- Indian Post Office Act
- The India Military Funds Act 1866 was passed in the Parliament of the United Kingdom
- The Indian Prize Money Act 1866 was passed in the Parliament of the United Kingdom
- Naval Discipline Act (British statute)
- Straits Settlements Act (British statute)
- The Third Pre-Independence Law Commission passed the Draft Contract Law
- The Viceroy's Executive Council, Sir Henry Maine and Sir James Fitzjames Stephen, passed the Indian Companies Act
- The Viceroy's Executive Council passed the Native Converts Marriage Dissolution Act
- The Viceroy's Executive Council passed the Trustees Act
- The Viceroy's Executive Council passed the Trustees and Mortgage Powers Act
- Calcutta Police Act, 1866 and the Calcutta Suburban Police Act, 1866 create the Kolkata Police Force
- Order of the Star of India was expanded to three classes

== Births ==
- Gopal Krishna Gokhale, social and political leader in the Indian independence movement, on 9 May in Kothluk, Ratnagiri District, Bombay Presidency
- Mahbub Ali Khan, Asaf Jah VI, Nizam of Hyderabad, on 17 August 1866 in Purani Haveli, Hyderabad
- Sham Singh, Raja of Chamba State from 1873 to 1904
- Raja of Panagal, zamindar of Kalahasti, born on 9 July
- Khengarji III, Maharajah of Cutch State, born on 23 August
- Syamadas Mukhopadhyaya, Indian mathematician who introduced the four-vertex theorem and Mukhopadhyaya's theorem in plane geometry, born on 22 June
- Hiralal Sen, photographer who is generally considered one of India's first filmmakers

== Deaths ==
- Ram Singh II, Maharao of Kota State, on 27 March 1866
- Hiravajra Singh Deo, Maharajah of Patna, August 1866
- George Cotton, English educator and clergyman, known for his connections with British India and the public school system, on 6 October in Kushtia
