= 1865 in India =

- Centuries: 17th; 18th; 19th; 20th; 21st
- Decades: 1840s; 1850s; 1860s; 1870s; 1880s
- See also: List of years in India; Timeline of Indian history

Events in the year 1865 in India.

== Incumbents ==
- Sir John Lawrence, Governor-General of India, 12 January 1864 – 12 January 1869
- Colonel Edmund Haythorne, Adjutant-General of India, 22 June 1860–January 1866
- Ram Singh II, Maharao of Kota State, 20 July 1828 – 27 March 1866
- Sagramji II Devaji (Sagramji Bhanabhai), Thakur of Gondal State, 1851-14 December 1869
- Bham Pratap Singh, Raja and Maharajah of Bijawar State, 23 November 1847 – 15 September 1899
- Shri Singh, Raja of Chamba State, 1844–1870
- Ranmalsinhji Amarsinhji, Raj Sahib of Dhrangadhra State, 9 April 1843 – 16 October 1869
- Madan Pal, Maharaja of Karauli State, 4 March 1854 – 16 August 1869
- Hiravajra Singh Deo, Maharajah of Patna, 1848-August 1866
- Cecil Beadon, Lieutenant-Governor of Bengal, 1862–1866
- Afzal ad-Dawlah, Asaf Jah V, Nizam of Hyderabad, 16 May 1857 – 26 February 1869
- Charles Pelly, revenue member of the Madras Legislative Council, 1862–1866

== Events ==
- British India defeated Bhutan, annexing parts of the Assam Duars, Bengal Duars, and Dewangiri (Western Duars
- Shapoorji Pallonji Group, Mumbai based business conglomerate, was founded
- Shergotty meteorite fell at Sherghati, Gaya, Bihar, India
- P&O Bank purchased Allahabad Bank
- Bombay Castle wall was demolished

== Law ==
- Indian Succession Act
- Government Of India Act
- India Office Site & Approaches Act
- Indian High Courts Act
- Indian Forest Acts, 1865 and 1878 extended the British Colonial claims over forests in India.

== Births ==
- Charles Astley Fowler, Divisional Commander during the Third Afghan War in 1919, born on 9 November
- William Birdwood, Commander-in-Chief of the Fifth Army on the Western Front in World War I, born on 13 September in Khadki
- Lucy Deane Streatfeild, civil servant, a social worker, and one of the first female factory inspectors in the United Kingdom; she was one of the first to raise concerns about the health risks arising from exposure to asbestos, born on 31 July in Madras
- Edward Allan Wood, Commandant of the Auxiliary Division during the Irish War of Independence, born on 6 May
- Lala Lajpat Rai, leader in the Indian Independence movement, born on 28 January in Dhudike, Punjab
- Bessie Sinclair Speechly, a Speechly, born on 31 August in Cottayam, India

== Deaths ==
- Alexander Kinloch Forbes, scholar of the Gujarati language and a colonial administrator in British India, died in Pune
