= Lakshman Pal =

Maharaja of Karauli (1869 – 1869)

- Maharajadhiraj; Yadukul Chandra Bhal

Maharaja of Karauli
- Reign: 17 August 1869 – 14 September 1869
- Predecessor: Madan Pal
- Successor: Jai Singh Pal
- Died: 14 September 1869
- Father: Bishan Pal

Lakshman Pal was Maharaja of Karauli from 17 August 1869 until his death on 14 September 1869.

== Biography ==
Lakshman Pal was born to Bishan Pal of Hadoti. He was a descendant of Kirti Pal, a son of Dharam Pal II, the Maharaja of Karauli, and his father was the biological brother of Madan Pal, the Maharaja of Karauli. Upon the death of his uncle, Madan Pal, on 17 August 1869, the throne of Karauli fell vacant, as he had left no male heir, either by birth or adoption, who could have succeeded him. Thereupon, Lakshman was chosen by the principal nobles of the state to succeed his deceased uncle on the throne. His succession was subsequently confirmed and approved by the British Government of India. However, before his formal installation could take place, Lakshman died on 14 September 1869. Throughout this period, the administration of the State remained in the hands of Vrishbhan Singh Tanwar, who was the father-in-law of Madan Pal. Following Lakshman’s death, Jai Singh Pal was elevated to the throne with the concurrence of the principal nobles of the State and Madan Pal’s widows.
