= Bhom Pal Deo =

Maharaja of Karauli (1927 – 1947)

- Maharajadhiraj; Yadukul Chandra Bhal
- Bhom Pal Deo, the Maharaja of Karauli, with his suite

Maharaja of Karauli
- Reign: 21 August 1927 – 6 April 1947
- Predecessor: Bhanwar Pal Deo
- Successor: Ganesh Pal Deo
- Born: 18 June 1866
- Died: 6 April 1947 (aged 80)
- Issue: Ganesh Pal Deo
- Father: Sugan Pal

Bhom Pal Deo (18 June 1866 – 6 April 1947) was Maharaja of Karauli from 21 August 1927 until his death in 1947.

== Early life and family ==
He was born on 18 June 1866 to Sugan Pal, the Thakur of Pardampura. Upon the death of Jai Singh Pal, the Maharaja of Karauli, in 1875, his father laid claim to the throne, but his claim was rejected. Subsequently, when his uncle, Arjun Pal II, the Rao of Hadoti, succeeded to the throne of Karauli, his father also asserted his claim to the Raoship of Hadoti. The matter was then referred to the principal chiefs or leading nobles of the state for their opinion, who, after considering the competing claims, unanimously decided that Bhom Pal was the rightful successor to the Raoship of Hadoti. He married three times: first, the daughter of Bhagwan Singh, a prominent noble of Karauli; second, the sister of Bhagwan Singh; and third, the daughter of Chiman Singh Tanwar, the Thakur of Mundia in Alwar. His first two wives died without issue. By his third wife, he had a son, Ganesh Pal Deo, and two daughters, of whom the eldest predeceased him and the younger was married to Lal Singh, the Maharajkumar of Idar.

== Reign ==
When Bhanwar Pal Deo, the Maharaja of Karauli, died on 3 August 1927 without leaving any male issue, of body or adoptive, to succeed him, Bhom Pal succeeded him on the throne on 21 August 1927. During his reign, the administration of the state was conducted by a Dewan, assisted by a Naib Dewan acting under his guidance in Ijlas Khas. He presided over the meetings of the Ijlas Khas, which were held once a week, and in them the matters beyond the Dewan’s jurisdiction were considered and decided. He was made a Knight Commander of the Most Exalted Order of the Star of India on 1 January 1935. In the later years of his reign, he entrusted Ganesh Pal Deo with full administrative powers.

== Death ==
He died on 6 April 1947 and was succeeded by his son, Ganesh Pal Deo, to his title, rank and dignity.
