= 1862 in India =

- Centuries: 17th; 18th; 19th; 20th; 21st
- Decades: 1840s; 1850s; 1860s; 1870s; 1880s
- See also: List of years in India; Timeline of Indian history

Events in the year 1862 in India.

== Incumbents ==
- Charles Canning, Viceroy
- James Bruce, 8th Earl of Elgin, Viceroy (from 21 March)

== Events ==
- 2 July – Calcutta High Court is established under the High Courts Act, 1861.
- Fort George in Bombay (now Mumbai) is destroyed

== Law ==
- Indian Stock Transfer Act (British statute)
- Habeas Corpus Act (British statute)
- Fine Arts Copyright Act (British statute)

== Births ==
- Binodini Dasi, actress and writer (died 1941).

== Deaths ==
- 7 November – Bahadur Shah II, the last Mughal emperor, dies in captivity in Rangoon, Burma
