= 1854 in India =

- Centuries: 17th; 18th; 19th; 20th; 21st
- Decades: 1830s; 1840s; 1850s; 1860s; 1870s
- See also: List of years in India; Timeline of Indian history

Events in the year 1854 in India.

== Incumbents ==
- James Broun-Ramsay, 1st Marquess of Dalhousie, Governor-General of India, 1848 to 1856
- Vyankatrao I Raje Ghorpade, Raja of Mudhol State, 20 February 1818-December 1854
- Balwantrao Raje Ghorpade, Raja of Mudhol State, December 1854-27 March 1862
- Thakur Sahib Akherajji IV Bhavsimhji, Rajput of Bhavnagar State, 1852–1854
- Thakur Sahib Jashwantsimhji Bhavsimhji, Rajput of Bhavnagar State, 1854–11 April 1870
- Muhammad Said Khan, Nawab of Rampur from 1840 to 1855, died on 1 April
- Ghulam Muhammad Ghouse Khan, Nawab of the Carnatic, 1825-1855

== Events ==
- March– The British Raj annexed Jhansi, Lakshmibai was given a pension of ₹60,000 and ordered to leave the palace and the fort.
- The British Raj annexed Jhansi, Nagpur, and Oudh and began annexing Udaipur State, Chhattisgarh
- Nagpur became the administrative division of Chota Nagpur Division
- Bhopal Agency was absorbed into the Central India Agency
- The British medal first issued the India General Service Medal (1854) to exceptional British and Indian soldiers
- Calcutta Survey first issued Inverted Head 4 Annas postage stamps
- Dalhousie, India, a hill station in Himachal Pradesh, was established by the British Empire's government in India as a summer retreat for its troops and officials
- Howrah Junction railway station was opened
- The first train ran on Eastern Railway zone between Howrah and Hooghly on 15 August
- The Dalhousie administration formally dissolved Fort William College
- The East India Company formed the 3rd Bengal (European) Light Infantry which later helped suppress the Indian Rebellion of 1857
- Woodstock School, a Christian, international, co-educational, residential school located in Landour, a small hill station contiguous with the town of Mussoorie, Uttarakhand, was established
- Government College of Art & Craft, one of the oldest art colleges in India, was established on 16 August at Garanhata, Chitpur
- Government Arts College, Kumbakonam was established on 19 October in Kumbakonam in Tamil Nadu
- Happy Valley Tea Estate, a tea garden in Darjeeling district in the Indian state of West Bengal, was established
- Khana railway station was established
- The portion of the Great Indian Peninsula Railway from Tannah to Callian was opened on May 1
- Dadabhai Naoroji founded a Gujarati fortnightly publication, the Rast Goftar ('The Truth Teller'), to clarify Zoroastrian concepts and promote Parsi social reforms
- Alexander Cunningham, a British army engineer with the Bengal Engineer Group, published LADĀK: Physical, Statistical, and Historical with Notices of the Surrounding Countries
- Nathan Brown, an American missionary, published খ্রীষ্টৰ বিবৰণ আৰু শুভ বাৰ্তা, Jesus Christ and his Holy Messages
- William Prinsep sold Belvedere Estate to the East India Company

== Law ==
- Telegraph Act

== Births ==
- Abdul Hafiz Mohamed Barakatullah, anti-British Indian revolutionary with sympathy for the Pan-Islamic movement, born on 7 July at Itwra Mohalla, Bhopal in Madhya Pradesh
- John Frederick McCrea, a South African recipient of the Victoria Cross, born on 2 April 1854 in Madras
- Matilda Smith, botanical artist whose work appeared in Curtis's Botanical Magazine for over forty years
- Isabel Cooper-Oakley, a prominent Theosophist and author, born on 31 January in Amritsar
- Arthur Anthony Macdonell, a noted Sanskrit scholar, born on 11 May in Muzaffarpur
- Richmond Ritchie, a British civil servant, born in Calcutta
- Vasudevanand Saraswati, Saint who is regarded as an incarnation of Lord Dattatreya, born on 13 August in Sindhudurg, Maharashtra, India

== Deaths ==
- Armine Simcoe Henry Mountain, British Army officer who served as Adjutant-General in India, died on 8 February 1854 in Fatehgarh
- Vyankatrao I Raje Ghorpade, Raja of the Mudhol State
- Thakur Sahib Akherajji IV Bhavsimhji, Rajput of Bhavnagar State
