= 1858 in India =

- Centuries: 17th; 18th; 19th; 20th; 21st
- Decades: 1830s; 1840s; 1850s; 1860s; 1870s
- See also: List of years in India; Timeline of Indian history

Events in the year 1858 in India.

== Incumbents ==
- Charles Canning, Governor-General, afterwards Viceroy

== Events ==
- January – General Sir Hugh Rose begins the Central India campaign; Sir Colin Campbell begins the campaign to recapture Lucknow; trial of Bahadur Shah, King of Delhi, from 27 January
- February – General Rose relieves Saugor; Campbell's Army of Oudh assembles on the Kanpur-Lucknow road to await Jang Bahadur's Gurkha army
- March – Lucknow is recaptured on 21 March; Central India campaign continues
- April – Battle of the Betwa; the city of Jhansi is stormed and captured (3–6 April); Azamgarh recaptured; advance on Kalpi (25 April); Campbell begins reconquest of Rohilkhand; Koer Singh leads a rising in Bihar; after his defeat he dies of his wounds
- May – Battle of Bareilly followed by its recapture; Battle of Kunch; recapture of Jagdispur; reoccupation of Kalpi; Battle of Mohamdi (24 May) and end of resistance in Rohilkhand; rebels begin guerrilla war in the jungle; Tatya Tope and the Rani of Jhansi outside Gwalior
- June – Gwalior army deserts to the rebels and Tatya Tope and the Rani of Jhansi seize Gwalior; General Rose marches from the Kalpi to Gwalior arriving on the 16th; next day the battle of Kotah-i-Serai and on the 19th the Battle of Gwalior; Gwalior fortress recaptured; during June guerrilla forces in Oudh, Bihar and along the Nepalese frontier are suppressed
- July to December – suppression of guerrilla forces except in Rajputana and Central India
- October to November – Bahadur Shah travels from Delhi into exile at Rangoon
- 1 November – the end of the British East India Company's rule in India is proclaimed

=== Dates unknown ===
- Achipudava Samaram led by Arattupuzha Velayudha Panicker in Alleppey, Travancore.

== Law ==
- August - Government of India Act 1878

== Births ==
- 20 July - Baba Sawan Singh, Second Satguru of Radha Soami Satsang Beas (died 2 April 1948).
- 9 July – Kaikhusrau Jahan, Begum of Bhopal (died 12 May 1930)
- 7 November – Bipin Chandra Pal (died 1932)
- 30 November – Jagadish Chandra Bose, physicist, biologist, botanist, archaeologist and science fiction writer (died 1937).

== Deaths ==
- Rani of Jhansi Lakshmibai, Queen of Jhansi State (d. 18 June at Gwalior, now Madhya Pradesh)
- Nawab Majju Khan, Indian freedom fighter.

== See also ==
- Timeline of the Indian Rebellion of 1857
