= Pratap Pal =

Maharaja of Karauli (1837 – 1848)

- Maharajadhiraj; Yadukul Chandra Bhal

Maharaja of Karauli
- Reign: c. 1838 – c. 1848
- Predecessor: Harbaksh Pal
- Successor: Nar Singh Pal
- Died: c. 1848
- Spouse: Takhat Kumari
- Issue: Jadaunji
- Father: Ameer Pal

Pratap Pal was Maharaja of Karauli from 1838 until his death in 1848.

== Early life and family ==
Pratap Pal was born to Ameer Pal. His grandfather, Jawahar Pal, was a son of Tursam Pal, the Maharaja of Karauli, and was adopted into the Hadoti family. He married, amongst others, a daughter of Fateh Singh, the Raja of Jaoli, under Alwar, and Takhat Kumari, a daughter of Abhey Singh, the Raja of Khandela (Senior), and his wife, Udawatji. He had issue: a daughter, Jadaunji, who married Shatru Sal II, the Maharao Raja of Kotah.

== Reign ==
Upon the death of Harbaksh Pal in 1838, the throne of Karauli became vacant, as he had left behind no male issue who could have succeeded him on it. Pratap was therefore selected and was raised to the throne. The East India Company at first did not recognise his succession to the throne, for two reasons: first, because the state owed them a large debt, and second, because a widow of Harbaksh Pal claimed she was pregnant and later announced the birth of a son to her. Pratap called that child fraudulent and illegitimate. This led the East India Company to intervene, and it appointed a commission to investigate the legitimacy of that child, and that commission concluded that the widow's claim was false and the child was a fraud. Based on the findings of the commission and upon payment of all debts, George Eden, the then Governor-General of India, issued his ruling at the close of 1839 in favour of Pratap and recognised him as the legitimate ruler of Karauli. He built the Pratap Saroman temple. He was an authoritarian ruler who repeatedly abused his authority to extract wealth from his subjects in an attempt to replenish the depleted state treasury. His imposition of heavy taxes impoverished his subjects and fuelled civic unrest in the state. The resulting unrest became so serious that British officers were sent to Karauli on four separate occasions to address public grievances, mediate between the ruler and his subjects, and restore order.

== Death ==
He died in 1848. As he had left behind no male issue to inherit his dignities and power, his family adopted Nar Singh Pal as his successor.
