= Ganesh Pal Deo =

Maharaja of Karauli (1947 – 1984)

- Maharajadhiraj; Yadukul Chandra Bhal
- Ganesh Pal Deo

Maharaja of Karauli
- Reign: 6 April 1947 – c. 1984
- Predecessor: Bhom Pal Deo
- Successor: Krishna Chandra Pal Deo
- Born: 3 February 1906
- Died: 1984 (aged 77–78)
- Spouses: Chauhanji; Jas Kanwar
- Father: Bhom Pal Deo
- Mother: Tanwarji
- Education: Mayo College

Ganesh Pal Deo (3 February 1906 – 1984) was Maharaja of Karauli from 6 April 1947 until his death in 1984.

== Early life, family, and education ==
Ganesh was born on 3 February 1906 to Bhom Pal Deo and his third wife Tanwarji. At the time of his birth, his father was still a Rao of Hadoti, and it was not until 21 August 1927 that he succeeded Bhanwar Pal Deo as the Maharaja of Karauli. He was educated at Mayo College in Ajmer. He studied there up to the diploma course. He married, amongst others, Chauhanji, a daughter of Krishna Dutt Singh, the Raja of Oel and Kaimahra, and Jas Kunwar, a daughter of Hamir Singh, the Raja of Khandela (Senior), by his fourth wife Uchab Kanwar (Tanwarji). He had issue: two sons, Brijendra Pal Deo and Surendra Pal Deo, and a daughter, Brijrajnandini Devi. In 1938, he built the Bhanwar Vilas Palace. He served as the Chief Member of the Karauli State Council. His father had, in the later part of his reign, entrusted him with full administrative powers so that he could conduct the administration of the state in his stead.

== Reign ==
Upon the death of his father on 6 April 1947, he succeeded him on the throne of Karauli. During his reign, the Indian Independence Act 1947 was passed by the Parliament of the United Kingdom. It officially terminated British paramountcy over the Princely States and gave them three options: to accede to India, to accede to Pakistan, or to remain independent. Exercising his prerogative, he signed the instrument of accession on 4 August 1947, whereby he acceded his state to India. His instrument of accession was accepted by the Government of India on 16 August 1947. In 1948, he, along with the rulers of Alwar, Bharatpur and Dholpur, signed the merger agreement to form the Matsya Union, which was merged with the United States of Greater Rajasthan on 15 May 1949 and with Rajasthan on 26 January 1950. He used to receive the privy purse of Rs. 1,05,000 from the Government of India. On 2 September 1970, a bill was passed in the Lok Sabha to terminate the privy purses and privileges of rulers of former Princely States, and following this, he ceased enjoying privileges, rights and annuities that had been guaranteed to him both in the Constitution of India and in the covenants of accession. Later, the President of India issued an executive order, in exercise of the powers vested in him under Article 366(22) of the Constitution, and derecognised him as the ruler of Karauli.

== Death ==
He died in 1984 and was succeeded by his grandson Krishna Chandra Pal Deo.
