= Arjun Pal II =

Maharaja of Karauli (1876–1886)

- Maharajadhiraj; Yadukul Chandra Bhal

Maharaja of Karauli
- Reign: 1 January 1876 – July 1886
- Predecessor: Jai Singh Pal
- Successor: Bhanwar Pal Deo
- Born: c. 1822
- Died: 1886 (aged 63–64)
- Father: Mangal Pal

Arjun Pal II (1822 – July 1886) was Maharaja of Karauli from January 1876 until his death in 1886.

== Early life ==
Pal was born in 1822 to Mangal Pal. He was a descendant of Kirti Pal, a son of Dharam Pal II, the Maharaja of Karauli. In the course of time, he became the Rao of Hadoti.

== Reign ==
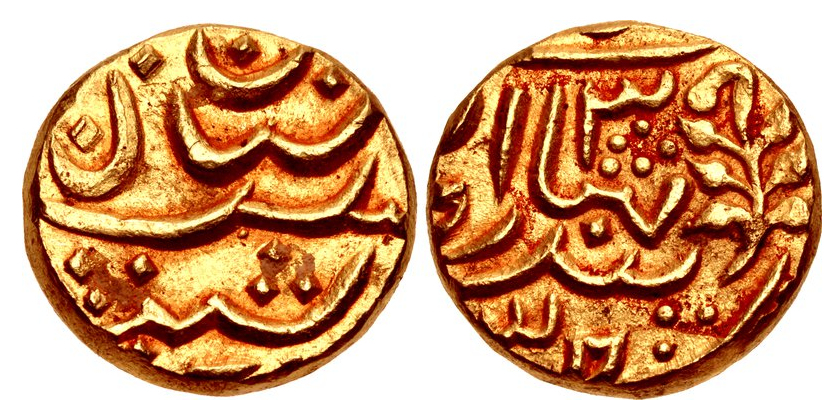
Coinage of Arjun Pal II

When Jai Singh Pal, the Maharaja of Karauli, died on 17 December 1875 without leaving behind any issue to succeed him, Arjun was selected to succeed him. His succession was recognised by the British Government of India, and on 1 January 1876, he was installed on the throne of Karauli by the then Political Agent, Col. Wright. Sujan Pal, on the occasion, also laid claim to the throne of Karauli. However, Sujan's claim was rejected, and thereupon he laid claim to the Raoship of Hadoti, which was vacant following Arjun's accession as the ruler of Karauli. This matter was then referred to the principal and leading nobles of the state, who decided that Bhom Pal Deo was the rightful successor to the Raoship of Hadoti. He attended the Delhi Durbar of 1877. On the occasion, as a mark of favour to him, the Government remitted the interest due on the debts owed by his state to them. Owing to his mismanagement, by 1881, the state was facing severe financial difficulties. This led the Government to intervene, and they deprived him of his ruling powers, and placed the administration in general control of Colonel Euan Smith, the Political Agent. Smith reconstituted the State Council and appointed five members to it in 1882. In 1883, Smith opened dispensaries at Mandrail, Maehilpur and Sapotra.

== Death ==
He died in July 1886 and was succeeded by Bhanwar Pal Deo.
