= 1883 in India =

- Centuries: 17th; 18th; 19th; 20th; 21st
- Decades: 1860s; 1870s; 1880s; 1890s; 1900s
- See also: List of years in India; Timeline of Indian history

Events in the year 1883 in India.

== Incumbents ==
- Empress of India – Queen Victoria
- Viceroy of India – George Robinson, 1st Marquess of Ripon

== Events ==
- National income – ₹ 4,213 million
- 15 September – Bombay Natural History Society founded
- The Calcutta International Exhibition world's fair was held from the end of 1883 to March 1884

== Law ==
- 9 February – Viceroy Lord Ripon's partial reversal of the Ilbert Bill (1883), a legislative measure that had proposed putting Indian judges in the Bengal Presidency on equal footing with British ones, that transformed the discontent into political action.
- Land Improvement Loans Act

== Births ==
- Bhargavaram Viththal Varerkar, Marathi writer (d. 1964).

== Deaths ==
- 17 February – Vasudev Balwant Phadke, Indian revolutionary (b.1845).
