= Jai Singh Pal =

Maharaja of Karauli (1871–1875)

- Maharajadhiraj; Yadukul Chandra Bhal

Maharaja of Karauli
- Reign: January 1871 – 17 December 1875
- Predecessor: Lakshman Pal
- Successor: Arjun Pal II
- Born: c. 1839
- Died: 17 December 1875 (aged 35–36)
- Father: Narayan Pal

Jai Singh Pal (1839 – 17 December 1875) was Maharaja of Karauli from January 1871 until his death on 17 December 1875.

== Birth ==
Pal was born in 1839 to Narayan Pal of Hadoti. He was a descendant of Kirti Pal, a son of Dharam Pal II, the Maharaja of Karauli.

== Reign ==
Upon the death of Lakshman Pal on 14 September 1869, before he could be formally installed as the Maharaja of Karauli, the principal nobles of the state and the widows of Madan Pal, with the concurrence of the Government of India, selected Jai to succeed to the throne of Karauli. However, it was not until January 1871 that he could ascend the throne. This was due to a dispute on the matter of adoption which took almost two years to settle, and during that time, the administration of the state was carried on by Vrishbhan Singh Tanwar, who was the father-in-law of Madan Pal. On the occasion of his accession, the Government presented him with a khilat and invested him with full ruling powers, and he kept Tanwar as part of his council of the state. In 1874, in order to gain new experiences, he undertook visits outside his state. He first visited Agra and then Delhi. During his time in Delhi, he called upon the Viceroy and Governor-General of India.

== Death ==
He died on 17 December 1875 and was succeeded by Arjun Pal II.
