= 1857 in India =

- Centuries: 17th; 18th; 19th; 20th; 21st
- Decades: 1830s; 1840s; 1850s; 1860s; 1870s
- See also: List of years in India; Timeline of Indian history

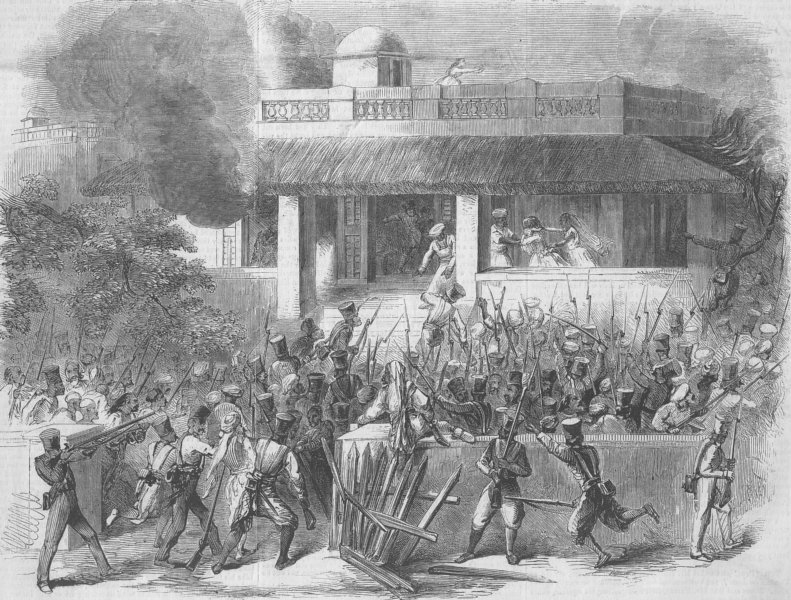
Destruction of a Bungalow at Meerut. Illustration for The Illustrated Times, 8 August 1857.

Events in the year 1857 in India.

== Incumbents ==
- Charles Canning, Governor-General

== Events ==
- 24 January – University of Calcutta is founded through the Calcutta University Act.
- 10 May (starting date of the revolt)- Indian rebellion of 1857 (also known as the Sepoy Mutiny) or The First War Of Indian Independence, widespread uprising in northern and central India against the rule of the British East India Company.
- May – following the mutiny at Meerut there are outbreaks in Delhi, Ferozepur, Bombay, Aligarh, Mainpuri, Etawah, Bulundshah, Nasirabad, Bareilly, Moradabad, Shahjahanpur and elsewhere; sepoys are disarmed in Lahore, Agra, Lucknow, Peshawar and Mardan; the Delhi Field Force advances to Karnaul; death of General Anson the British commander-in-chief
- June – Mutinies at Sitapur, Hansi, Hissar, Azamgarh, Gorakhpur and Nimach; mutinies at Gwalior, Bharatpur and Jhansi; mutiny at Kanpur, followed by the siege of the Europeans (4–25 June) and a massacre; mutiny in Banaras forestalled; mutinies at Jewanpur, Allahabad, Jullundur, Phillaur, Nowgong, Rhoni, Fatehgarh, Aurangabad (Deccan), Fatehpur and Jubbulpur; Indian units are forcibly disarmed at Nagpur and Barrackpur; mutinies at Faizabad, Sultanpur and Lucknow; order is restored in Lucknow but the district remains disturbed (Europeans take shelter in the Residency); British defeat at Chinhat (30 June) near Lucknow; siege of Lucknow begins. Other events of June: Battle of Badli-ki-Serai (8 June); Delhi Field Force takes up position on the Ridge and begins operations against Delhi; further spreading of the revolt through the Gangetic plain, Rajputana and Central India
- July – Mutinies at Indore and Mhow, Auggur, Jhelum, Saugor, Sialkot, Dinapur and Agra; siege of the Lucknow Residency continues through July; operations against Delhi continue through July; death of General Barnard, commanding at Delhi (5 July); General Havelock's force advances from Allahabad to the relief of Kanpur and arrives on the 17th, one day too late to save those massacred there; disarming of Indian units in Rawalpindi; Sialkot mutineers defeated at Trimmu Ghat (16 July)
- 18 July – University of Bombay (University of Mumbai) is founded
- August – Mutinies at Kolhapur (Bombay Presidency), Poonamali (near Madras), Jubbulpur, Bhopawar (near Indore), and Mian Mir (near Lahore); rebellion spreads through the Saugor and Narbada districts. Also: disarmament of Indian units at Berhampur (1 August); siege of the Lucknow Residency continues and Havelock's first attempt at relief fails
- September – Failure of an outbreak in Karachi (14 Sept.); further outbreaks in the Saugor and Narbada districts; siege of Saugor begins; the City of Delhi is assaulted and captured by the British (14-20 Sept.); the Lucknow residency is relieved by Havelock and Outram (25 Sept.) but a new siege of the reinforced garrison begins
- 5 September – University of Madras is founded
- October – Mutiny at Bhogalpur (near Dinapur); unrest in Bihar, north Bengal and Assam; mutiny in Bombay city is forestalled (15 Oct.); revolt in Kotah state (15 Oct.)
- November – Sir Colin Campbell relieves Lucknow (17 Nov.); the garrison is evacuated and the city and Residency are temporarily abandoned; defeat of General Windham outside Kanpur (28 Nov.)
- December – Decisive battle of Kanpur (6 Dec.); the armies of Rao Sahib and of Tatya Tope are routed by Sir Colin Campbell; campaign in the Doab; capture of Fatehgarh

== Law ==
- Joint-stock Companies Act
- Oriental Gas Company Act

== See also ==
- Timeline of the Indian Rebellion of 1857
