= 1874 in India =

- Centuries: 17th; 18th; 19th; 20th; 21st
- Decades: 1850s; 1860s; 1870s; 1880s; 1890s
- See also: List of years in India; Timeline of Indian history

Events in the year 1874 in India.

== Incumbents ==
- Thomas Baring, 1st Earl of Northbrook, Viceroy

== Events ==
- National income - ₹3,507 million
- Bihar famine of 1873–74
- East India Company is dissolved.

== Law ==
- Married Women's Property Act
- Civil Jails Act
- East India Annuity Funds Act (British statute)
- East India Loan Act (British statute)
- Courts (Colonial) Jurisdiction Act (British statute)
- Colonial Clergy Act (British statute)

== Births ==
- Kavi Kalapi, poet (died 1900)
