= 1882 in India =

- Centuries: 17th; 18th; 19th; 20th; 21st
- Decades: 1860s; 1870s; 1880s; 1890s; 1900s
- See also: List of years in India; Timeline of Indian history

Events in the year 1882 in India.

== Incumbents ==
- Empress of India – Queen Victoria
- Viceroy of India – George Robinson, 1st Marquess of Ripon

== Events ==
- National income - ₹4,095 million

== Law ==
- Powers Of Attorney Act
- Transfer Of Property Act
- Presidency Small Cause Courts Act
- Code Of Civil Procedure
- Indian Trust Act
- Indian Easements Act
- Documentary Evidence Act (British statute)
- Reserve Forces Act (British statute)

== Births ==
- 1 July – Bidhan Chandra Roy, second Chief Minister of West Bengal (d.1962).
- 11 December – Subramanya Bharathi, poet, independence fighter and reformer (d.1921).

== Deaths ==
- 6 January – Bharatendu Harishchandra, writer and poet (b.1850).
