= Nar Singh Pal =

Maharaja of Karauli (1849 – 1852)

- Maharajadhiraj; Yadukul Chandra Bhal

Maharaja of Karauli
- Reign: c. 1849 – 10 July 1852
- Predecessor: Pratap Pal
- Successor: Bharat Pal
- Died: July 10, 1852
- Father: Madhu Pal

Nar Singh Pal was Maharaja of Karauli from 1849 until his death on 10 July 1852.

== Birth ==
Pal was born to Madhu Pal, the Rao of Hadoti. He was a descendant of Kirti Pal, a son of Dharam Pal II, the Maharaja of Karauli.

== Reign ==
When Pratap Pal, the Maharaja of Karauli, died in 1849 without leaving a male heir, his family adopted Pal as his successor. Although his succession was undisputed, disputes arose over his guardianship. At the time, the state also owed the East India Company a debt of 1,54,312 rupees, and the British withheld recognition of his succession until arrangements had been made for its repayment. Before officially recognising him as Maharaja, they required him to undertake to pay an instalment of the state's debt. As Pal was still a child, his guardian assumed responsibility for managing the payment on his behalf. However, the instalment was not paid until after the deadline set by the British had passed. All this created an opportunity for his power-hungry family members, who tried to convince the British to depose Pal, install them, and, if this was to be done, they promised to pay back the state's debts faster. Seeing the growing instability in Karauli, the British decided to depose Pal. However, his guardian strongly opposed this and argued that removing Pal would be entirely unfair because they were fully prepared to pay their instalments on time. Later, the British realised that deposing Pal would actually trigger an even worse civil war, and gave up this idea. They then confirmed Pal as the ruler, and at the same time stationed a Political Agent in the state, to whose charge they committed the direct management of affairs of the state.

== Death ==
He died on 10 July 1852. He had, before his death, adopted Bharat Pal as his successor.
