= 1876 in India =

- Centuries: 17th; 18th; 19th; 20th; 21st
- Decades: 1850s; 1860s; 1870s; 1880s; 1890s
- See also: List of years in India; Timeline of Indian history

Events in the year 1876 in India.

== Incumbents ==
- Thomas Baring, 1st Earl of Northbrook, Viceroy
- Robert Bulwer-Lytton, 1st Earl of Lytton, Viceroy (from 12 April)

== Events ==
- National income - ₹3,887 million
- Queen Victoria is proclaimed "Empress of India" and transfers powers from East India Company to the British Crown.
- Lokopriya Gopinath Bordoloi Regional Institute of Mental Health was set up as Tezpur Lunatic Asylum in April, 1876.

== Law ==
- Royal Titles Act (British statute)
- Customs Consolidation Act (British statute)
- Slave Trade Act (British statute)
- Statute Law Revision (Substituted Enactments) Act (British statute)

== Births ==
- 15 September – Sharat Chandra Chatterji, novelist (d. 1938).
- 25 December – Muhammad Ali Jinnah, Statesman and founder of Pakistan (d. 1948).
