= 1853 in India =

- Centuries: 17th; 18th; 19th; 20th; 21st
- Decades: 1830s; 1840s; 1850s; 1860s; 1870s
- See also: List of years in India; Timeline of Indian history

Events in the year 1853 in India.

== Events ==
- April 16 – The first Indian train steamed off from Bombay to Thane. The train was drawn by three steam locomotives and covered the 34 km distance in 57 minutes.
- The Nizam of Hyderabad cedes Berar to the British so that its revenues could support the Hyderabad contingent in the British army.
- Annexations of Jhansi and Nagpur.

== Law ==
- Coinage (Colonial Offences) Act
- Customs Consolidation Act
- Charter Act 1853

== Births ==
- Chattampi Swamikal, Hindu sage and social reformer (died 1924).

== Deaths ==
- Kerala Varma IV, monarch of Kingdom of Cochin died at Benaras.
