= 1856 in India =

- Centuries: 17th; 18th; 19th; 20th; 21st
- Decades: 1830s; 1840s; 1850s; 1860s; 1870s
- See also: List of years in India; Timeline of Indian history

Events in the year 1856 in India.

== Incumbents ==
- Queen Victoria, Monarch of United Kingdom.
- James Broun-Ramsay, 1st Marquess of Dalhousie, Governor-General of India (since 12 January 1848)
- Charles Canning, 1st Earl Canning, Governor-General of India (till 21 March 1862)

== Events ==
- 11 February– Nawab Wajid Ali Shah deposed. He was last King of Oudh State, reigned 13 February 1847 – 11 February 1856. Annexation of the Kingdom of Oudh
- 28 February – End the tenure of Governor-General of India James Broun-Ramsay, 1st Marquess of Dalhousie.
- 28 February – Charles Canning, 1st Earl Canning became Governor-General of India (till 21 March 1862)
- 25 July – Hindu Widows' Remarriage Act, 1856

== Law ==
- Indian Bills of Lading Act
- Foreign Tribunals Evidence Act (British statute)

== Births ==
- 4 March – Toru Dutt, poet (died 1877).
- 1 April – Acacio Gabriel Viegas, Goan physician (died 1933)
- 14 June – Ahmed Rida Khan, Sunni Muslim scholar and founder of Barelwi school of thought (died 1921).
- 23 July – Bal Gangadhar Tilak, nationalist, social reformer and independence fighter (died 1920).
- 20 August – Narayana Guru (died 1928)
