= 1881 in India =

- Centuries: 17th; 18th; 19th; 20th; 21st
- Decades: 1860s; 1870s; 1880s; 1890s; 1900s
- See also: List of years in India; Timeline of Indian history

Events in the year 1881 in India.

== Incumbents ==
- Empress of India – Queen Victoria
- Viceroy of India – George Robinson, 1st Marquess of Ripon
- The Tribune - started in 1881

== Events ==
- National income - ₹4,088 million
- The 7.9 M_{w} Nicobar Islands earthquake shook the area with a maximum EMS-98 intensity of VII (Damaging). It is probably the earliest earthquake for which rupture parameters were estimated instrumentally.
- First commercial bank of India was established (Oudh Commercial Bank). Having an entirely Indian board of directors. In Faizabad, India
- Setakaryancha Asuda(the whip-cord of the peasantry)

== Law ==
- Negotiable Instruments Act
- Obstructions In Fairways Act
- Judicial Committee Act (British statute)
- India Office (Sale Of Superfluous Land) Act (British statute)
- East Indian Railway (Redemption Of Annuities) Act (British statute)
- Army Act (British statute)
- Fugitive Offenders Act (British statute)

== Births ==
- November – Darwan Singh Negi, recipient of the Victoria Cross for gallantry in 1914 (d.1950).

Varahaneri Venkatesa Subramaniam Aiyar, also known as V. V. S. Aiyar, was an Indian revolutionary from Tamil Nadu who fought against British colonial rule in India_2 April 1881.
