= Harbaksh Pal =

Maharaja of Karauli from 1804 to 1838

- Maharajadhiraj; Yadukul Chandra Bhal

Maharaja of Karauli
- Reign: c. 1804 – c. 1838
- Predecessor: Amolak Pal
- Successor: Pratap Pal
- Died: c. 1838
- Father: Manik Pal

Harbaksh Pal was Maharaja of Karauli from 1804 until his death in 1838. He was among the first-class nobles at the durbar of the Mughal Emperor.

== Early life and family ==
Harbaksh was born to Manik Pal, the Maharaja of Karauli. He had an older brother, Amolak Pal, and two sisters, one of whom married Pratap Singh, the Maharaja of Jaipur, and the other married Bishan Singh, the Maharao Raja of Bundi.

== Reign ==
Upon the death of Amolak Pal in 1804, he succeeded him on the throne of Karauli. Soon afterwards, he suppressed a dacoit, Nawab Muhammad Shah Khan. His coins used to bear the name of Akbar II. He used to pay the Peshwa a tribute of 25,000 rupees per annum. In 1817, the Peshwa, Baji Rao II, signed the treaty of Poona with the East India Company and surrendered to the Company all rights and claims over his tributaries in Hindustan and Malwa. Thus, Karauli came under the protection of the company. On 9 November 1817, he concluded a treaty with Charles Metcalfe, acting on behalf of the company, placing Karauli under British protection and freeing it from Maratha exactions. No tribute was levied, but he was required to furnish troops according to his means on the requisition of the company. In an effort to recover territories south of the Chambal that once belonged to his state but had been annexed by the Scindias of Gwalior, he appealed to the British authorities for assistance; however, the latter declined to intervene. This refusal prompted Pal to reconsider his alliance with the British, and in 1825, at a time when the British were engaged in the First Anglo-Burmese War and were busy assisting Balwant Singh, the ruler of Bharatpur, against a rebellion led by his relative Durjan Sal, Harbaksh Pal rose against the British with a sizeable force. After the British managed to suppress his rebellion, he submitted to them, and they granted him a full pardon. He subsequently resumed friendly relations with them. During his reign, disputes between Karauli and Jaipur concerning their respective boundaries and territorial rights were also settled amicably. He had built a rampart around Mandrayal.

== Death ==
He died in 1838 and was succeeded by Pratap Pal to his dignities and power.
