= 1852 in India =

- Centuries: 17th; 18th; 19th; 20th; 21st
- Decades: 1830s; 1840s; 1850s; 1860s; 1870s
- See also: List of years in India; Timeline of Indian history

Events in the year 1852 in India.

== Events ==
- 2nd Burma War.

== Law ==
- Colonial Bishops Act (British statute)
