= 1864 in India =

- Centuries: 17th; 18th; 19th; 20th; 21st
- Decades: 1840s; 1850s; 1860s; 1870s; 1880s
- See also: List of years in India; Timeline of Indian history

Events in the year 1864 in India.

== Incumbents ==
- Sir William Denison, acting Viceroy (till 12 January)
- Sir John Lawrence, Viceroy

== Events ==
- 9 January - Scientific Society of Aligarh established as part of Aligarh Movement by Syed Ahmad Khan.
- 1 November - A massive cyclone and tidal wave destroys Masulipatnam and kills nearly 30,000 people.

=== Dates unknown ===
- Simla was declared as the summer capital of British India by John Lawrence, 1st Baron Lawrence.
- Dietrich Brandis set up Imperial Forest Department the earlier form of Indian Forest Service.

== Law ==
- Indian Tolls Act
- Naval Prize Act (British statute)
- India Office Site Act (British statute)
