= 1848 in India =

- Centuries: 17th; 18th; 19th; 20th; 21st
- Decades: 1820s; 1830s; 1840s; 1850s; 1860s
- See also: List of years in India; Timeline of Indian history

Events in the year 1848 in India.

== Incumbents ==
- The Marquess of Dalhousie, Governor-General, 1848–56.

== Events ==
- 2nd Sikh War, 1848–49.
- Annexation of Sattara.

== Law ==
- Indian Insolvency Act

== Births ==
- 28 September – Kabibar Radhanath Ray, poet (died 1908).
