= 1850 in India =

- Centuries: 17th; 18th; 19th; 20th; 21st
- Decades: 1830s; 1840s; 1850s; 1860s; 1870s
- See also: List of years in India; Timeline of Indian history

Events in the year 1850 in India.

== Events ==
- National income - ₹5,910 million
- The ceremony of turning the first sod for the Great Indian Peninsula Railway from Mumbai to Kalyan was performed by J. P. Willoughby at a place near Sion.

== Law ==
- Judicial Officers Protection Act
- Piracy Act (British statute)

== Births ==
- 9 September – Bharatendu Harishchandra, writer and poet (died 1882).
