= 1877 in India =

- Centuries: 17th; 18th; 19th; 20th; 21st
- Decades: 1850s; 1860s; 1870s; 1880s; 1890s
- See also: List of years in India; Timeline of Indian history

Events in the year 1877 in India.

== Incumbents ==
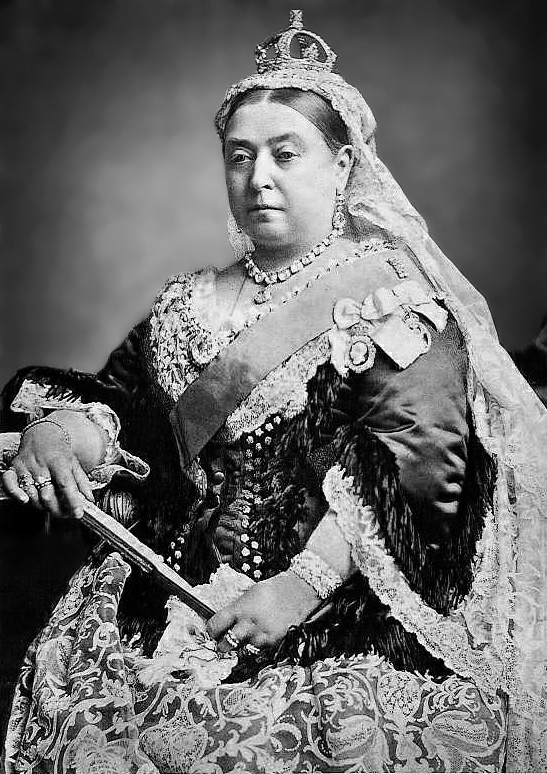
Queen Victoria, the Empress of India

- Empress of India – Queen Victoria
- Viceroy of India – Robert Bulwer-Lytton, 1st Earl of Lytton

== Events ==
- Celebrations in darbars are held in India now that Queen Victoria is Empress of India.
- 1 July 1877 – Kutch Museum was founded.
- Gilgit Agency was formed.
- First suspension bridge in India was opened in Punalur, Travancore (now in Kerala).
- Jowaki Expedition against the Afridi tribe.

== Law ==
- Limitation Act
- East India Loan Act (British statute)
- Code Of Civil Procedure

== Births ==
- 2 November – Sir Sultan Mahomed Shah, Aga Khan III, The Founders and the First Permanent President of the All-India Muslim League (AIML). (Death, 11 July 1957).
- 9 November – Sir, Dr. Allama Muhammad Iqbal, The Poet of The East, Presenter of the Idea of Pakistan (died, 21 April 1938 in Lahore, Pakistan).
- 24 November – Kavasji Jamshedji Petigara, first Indian to become the Deputy Commissioner of Police of the Mumbai Police (d.1941).

== Deaths ==
- 30 August – Toru Dutt, poet (b.1856).
