= 1851 in India =

- Centuries: 17th; 18th; 19th; 20th; 21st
- Decades: 1830s; 1840s; 1850s; 1860s; 1870s
- See also: List of years in India; Timeline of Indian history

Events in the year 1851 in India.

== Incumbents ==
- James Broun-Ramsay, 1st Marquess of Dalhousie, Governor-General of India, 1848 to 1856
- Vyankatrao I Raje Ghorpade, Raja of Mudhol State, 20 February 1818-December 1854
- Muhammad Said Khan, Nawab of Rampur from 1840 to 1855, died on 1 April
- Ghulam Muhammad Ghouse Khan, Nawab of the Carnatic, 1825-1855
- Chintaman Rao I "Appa Sahib", founder and Rao of Sangli State, 1782–15 July 1851
- Dhundi Rao Chintaman Rao "Tatya Sahib", Rao of Sangli State, 15 July 1851-12 December 1901
- Gumansinhji, Maharawal of Chhota Udaipur State, 1822-1851
- Jitsinhji, Maharawal of Chhota Udaipur State, 1851-1881
- Ram Baksh, Prime Minister of Hyderabad, September 1849–April 1851
- Ganesh Rao, April 1851–June 1851
- Ratan Singh, Maharajah of Bikaner State, 25 March 1828-7 August 1851
- Sardar Singh, Maharajah of Bikaner State, 7 August 1851–16 May 1872

== Events ==
- The first experimental electric telegraph line, between Calcutta and Diamond Harbour, is opened for the British East India Company
- Oriental Bank Corporation chartered to allow competition with the East India Company's opium billing monopoly
- Naga raided the East India Company from 1851 to 1865
- The first train in India becomes operational on 22 December, for localised hauling of canal construction material in Roorkee
- British Indian Association, a pan-nationalist political group, established on 31 October
- Dadabhai Naoroji foundesthe Rahnumae Mazdayasne Sabha (Guides on the Mazdayasne Path) on 1 August
- Mongnawng State gained independence from Hsenwi State
- Murree established in the Punjab
- Roman Catholic Archdiocese of Hyderabad established as Apostolic Vicariate of Hyderabad from the Apostolic Vicariate of Madras
- Holy Trinity Church, Bangalore built
- Government Museum, Chennai established

== Law ==
- The British Parliament passes the Lunatics Removal (India) Act 1851 and the Marriages, India Act 1851
- Indian Tolls Act
- Court of Chancery Act 1851 (British statute)

== Births ==
- Mahmud al-Hasan, a Deobandi scholar who actively campaigned against Britain's rule in India, born in Bareilly, Uttar Pradesh
- Jaswant Singh of Bharatpur, ruled Bharatpur State, born in Deeg on 1 March
- Henry George Impey Siddons, an Indian educationist, born in Indore
- Harry Charles Purvis Bell, British civil servant and a commissioner in the Ceylon Civil Service
- Henry Stephens Salt, British writer and social reformer, born on 20 September

== Deaths ==
- Ayya Vaikundar, also known as Historical Vaikundar, who effectively founded the Ayyavazhi religion, died on 3 June
- Chintaman Rao I "Appa Sahib", founder of Sangli State, died on 15 July 1851
- Ratan Singh, Maharajah of Bikaner State, died on 7 August 1851
- John Elliot Drinkwater Bethune, Anglo-Indian lawyer and a pioneer in promoting women's education, died on 12 August in Kolkata
