= 1871 in India =

- Centuries: 17th; 18th; 19th; 20th; 21st
- Decades: 1850s; 1860s; 1870s; 1880s; 1890s
- See also: List of years in India; Timeline of Indian history

Events in the year 1871 in India.

== Incumbents ==
- Richard Bourke, 6th Earl of Mayo, Viceroy

== Events ==
- National income - ₹3,348 million

== Law ==
- 12 October – Criminal Tribes Act enacted by British rule in India, which named over 160 communities "Criminal Tribes", i.e. hereditary criminals. It was repealed in 1949.
- Pensions Act
- Cattle Trespass Act
- Limitation Act
- India Stock Dividends Act (British statute)

== Births ==
- 7 August —Abanindranath Tagore, India writer and painter (died 1951).
