= 1847 in India =

- Centuries: 17th; 18th; 19th; 20th; 21st
- Decades: 1820s; 1830s; 1840s; 1850s; 1860s
- See also: List of years in India; Timeline of Indian history

== Events ==
- The Doctrine of Lapse (1847): Lord Dalhousie, the Governor-General of India, introduced this policy, allowing the British to annex Indian princely states if their rulers died without a male heir.
- Annexation of Punjab (1847): The British East India Company annexed Punjab after the First Anglo-Sikh War.
- Treaty of Bhyrowal (1847): The British and Maharaja Gulab Singh of Jammu signed a treaty, establishing the princely state of Jammu and Kashmir.
- The first railway line completed in India between Bombay and Thane came to fruition on April 16, 1853, although the proposal and planning phase began earlier in 1847. This railway line covered a distance of approximately 21 miles (34 kilometers).
- Founding of the Bethune School (1847): The school was established in Calcutta (now Kolkata) to promote women's education.

== Categories ==
- History of India
- British Raj
