= 1879 in India =

- Centuries: 17th; 18th; 19th; 20th; 21st
- Decades: 1850s; 1860s; 1870s; 1880s; 1890s
- See also: List of years in India; Timeline of Indian history

Events in the year 1879 in India.

== Incumbents ==
- Empress of India – Queen Victoria
- Viceroy of India – Robert Bulwer-Lytton, 1st Earl of Lytton

== Events ==
- National income - ₹ 4,083 million
- The Bombay Dyeing & Mfg. Co. Ltd., a textile company, established

== Law ==
- Elephants' Preservation Act
- Legal Practitioners Act
- Registration of Births, Deaths and Marriages (Army) Act (British statute)
- Indian Guaranteed Railways Act (British statute)
- East Indian Railway (Redemption of Annuities) Act (British statute)
- East India Loan Act (British statute)

== Births ==
- K. N. Sivaraja Pillai (1879–1941) Indian historian, dravidologist and professor (d. 1941).
- Sarojini Naidu (1879–1949) Indian political activist and poet
- Periyar E.V. Ramasamy (1879–1973) Indian social activist and politician
