= 1878 in India =

- Centuries: 17th; 18th; 19th; 20th; 21st
- Decades: 1850s; 1860s; 1870s; 1880s; 1890s
- See also: List of years in India; Timeline of Indian history

Events in the year 1878 in India.

== Incumbents ==
- Empress of India – Queen Victoria
- Viceroy of India – Robert Bulwer-Lytton, 1st Earl of Lytton

== Events ==
- National income - ₹3,960 million
- 20 September – The Hindu, an Indian newspaper, was founded.
- 26 December - Anglo-Portuguese Treaty of 1878 that opened up Goa to British Raj.

== Law ==
- Vernacular Press Act
- Indian Treasure Trove Act
- Sea Customs Act
- Dentists Act (British statute)
- Elders' Widows' Fund (India) Act (British statute)
- Territorial Waters Jurisdiction Act (British statute)

== Births ==
- 21 February – The Mother (Mirra Alfassa), multi-origined spiritual leader and founder of Auroville in India (d. 1973)
- 27 November – Jatindramohan Bagchi, poet (d. 1948).
- 10 December – C. Rajagopalachari, Indian politician and freedom-fighter. (d. 1972)

== Deaths ==
- 15 June - Shiv Dayal Singh, Founder and first Satguru of Radha Soami faith (born 1818).
