= 1872 in India =

- Centuries: 17th; 18th; 19th; 20th; 21st
- Decades: 1850s; 1860s; 1870s; 1880s; 1890s
- See also: List of years in India; Timeline of Indian history

Events in the year 1872 in India.

== Incumbents ==
- Richard Bourke, 6th Earl of Mayo, Viceroy
- Sir John Strachey, acting Viceroy (9–23 February)
- Francis Napier, 10th Lord Napier, acting Viceroy (24 February – 3 May)
- Thomas Baring, 1st Earl of Northbrook, Viceroy (from 3 May)

== Events ==
- National income - ₹3,376 million
- 8 February - Viceroy of India, Lord Mayo killed by a prisoner of Cellular Jail, Sher Ali Afridi.

== Law ==
- Indian Evidence Act
- Indian Contract Act
- Indian Christian Marriage Act
- Naturalisation Act (British statute)
- Civil Marriage Act

== Births ==
- 14 April – Abdullah Yusuf Ali, Islamic scholar who translated the Qur'an into English (died 1953).
- 15 August – Sri Aurobindo, nationalist, scholar, poet, mystic, evolutionary philosopher, yogi and guru (died 1950).
- 25 December – Ganganath Jha, scholar of Sanskrit, Indian philosophy and Buddhist philosophy (died 1941).

== Deaths ==
- 8 February – Richard Bourke, 6th Earl of Mayo, Viceroy
