= 1868 in India =

- Centuries: 17th; 18th; 19th; 20th; 21st
- Decades: 1840s; 1850s; 1860s; 1870s; 1880s
- See also: List of years in India; Timeline of Indian history

Events in the year 1868 in India.

== Incumbents ==
- Sir John Lawrence, Viceroy

== Events ==
- Tata Group is founded By Jamsethji Tata.
- Dadabhai Naroji computed the National Income of India ( Annual Per capita Income ) to be Rs. 20.

== Law ==
- Indian Railway Companies Act (British statute)
- Documentary Evidence Act (British statute)
- Indian Prize Money Act (British statute)

== Births ==
- Ardeshir Godrej, an 1868 Indian businessman, (died 1936).

== Death ==
- 18 February – Acharya Maharajshree Ayodhyaprasad Pande, Acharya of Swaminarayan Sampraday (born 1809).
