= 1880 in India =

- Centuries: 17th; 18th; 19th; 20th; 21st
- Decades: 1860s; 1870s; 1880s; 1890s; 1900s
- See also: List of years in India; Timeline of Indian history

Events in the year 1880 in India.

== Incumbents ==
- Empress of India – Queen Victoria
- Viceroy of India – Robert Bulwer-Lytton, 1st Earl of Lytton
- Viceroy of India – George Robinson, 1st Marquess of Ripon (from 8 June)

== Events ==
- National income - ₹4,025 million
- 18 September – 151 people were buried in a landslip at Naini Tal following 36 inches (910 mm) of rain in 68 hours.

== Law ==
- Religious Societies Act
- Kazis Act
- East India Loan (East Indian Railway Debentures) Act (British statute)
- India Stock (Powers of Attorney) Act (British statute)

== Births ==
- 16 March – Rajshekhar Basu, writer, chemist and lexicographer (died 27 April 1960).
- 31 July – Munshi Premchand, foremost Writer in Hindu-Urdu Literature and Indian Freedom fighter (died 8 October 1936).
- Abul Muhasin Muhammad Sajjad, scholar, freedom fighter and founder of Muslim Independent Party (died 1940).
