= 1861 in India =

- Centuries: 17th; 18th; 19th; 20th; 21st
- Decades: 1840s; 1850s; 1860s; 1870s; 1880s
- See also: List of years in India; Timeline of Indian history

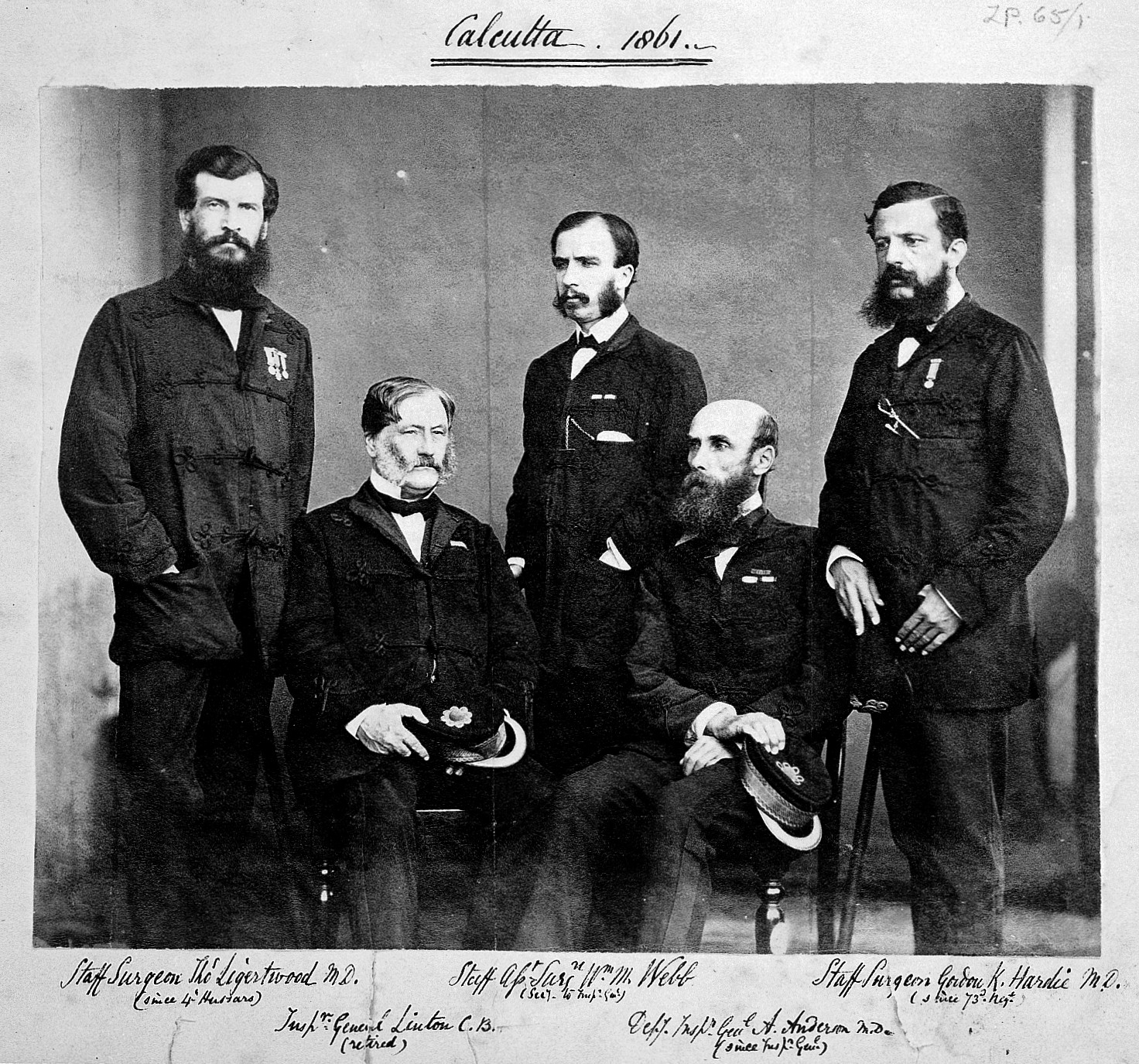
Army surgical staff, Calcutta 1861.

Events in the year 1861 in India:

== Incumbents ==
- Charles Canning, Viceroy

== Events ==
- Girls' High School & College, Allahabad, is founded.
- The Delhi Department of Police is founded.

== Law ==
- Indian Councils Act 1861
- Indian Civil Services Act
- Indian High Courts Act
- Police Act
- Stage-Carriages Act
- Foreign Law Ascertainment Act (British statute)
- East India Loan Act (British statute)
- Malicious Damages Act (British statute)
- Wills Act (British statute)
- Domicile Act (British statute)

== Births ==
- 27 January: Baba Tajuddin Nagpuri, Sufi, saint, healer (died 1925).
- 6 May: Motilal Nehru (died 1931).
- 7 May: Rabindranath Tagore, poet, artist, playwright, novelist and composer (died 1941).
- 18 June: Devaki Nandan Khatri, first author of mystery novels in Hindi (died 1913).
- 18 July:Kadambini Ganguly, first female medical practitioner and one of the first female graduates of the then Indian subcontinent (died 1923).
- 2 Aug: Sir Prafulla Chandra Ray.(died 1944).
- 21 Sept: Sir Mokshagundam Visvesvaraya (died 1962).
- 24 Sep: Bhikaiji Cama, independence campaigner (died 1936).
