= 1859 in India =

- Centuries: 17th; 18th; 19th; 20th; 21st
- Decades: 1830s; 1840s; 1850s; 1860s; 1870s
- See also: List of years in India; Timeline of Indian history

Events in the year 1859 in India.

== Incumbents ==
- Charles Canning, Viceroy

== Events ==
- The Indian rebellion of 1857 ends (formally declared in July).
- The execution of Tatya Tope (Ramachandra Pandurang Tope), 18 April, a Maratha leader in the Indian Rebellion of 1857, occurs.
- Indigo revolt

== Law ==
- Limitation Act
- Civil Procedure Code
- East India Loan Act (British statute)
- Evidence By Commission Act (British statute)
- Royal Naval Reserve (Volunteer) Act (British statute)
- British Law Ascertainment Act (British statute)
