= Harry Bard =

Secretary of Pan American Society

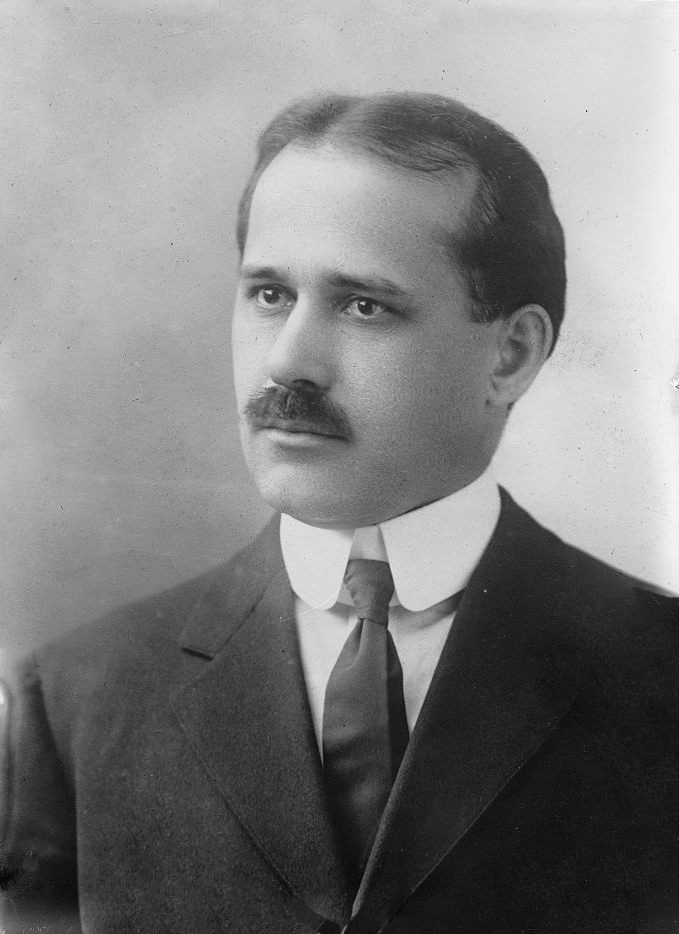
Harry Bard between ca. 1910 and ca. 1915

Harry Erwin Bard (August 27, 1867 - July 13, 1955) was secretary of the Pan American Society of the United States. He was also an author on education specializing in South America.

== Biography ==
He was born on August 27, 1867, in Montgomery County, Indiana. He died in 1955 in New York at age 87.

== Publications ==
- Intellectual and Cultural Relations between the United States and the other Republics of America (1914)
- South America (1916)
- The City School District (1909)
