= 1849 in India =

- Centuries: 17th; 18th; 19th; 20th; 21st
- Decades: 1820s; 1830s; 1840s; 1850s; 1860s
- See also: List of years in India; Timeline of Indian history

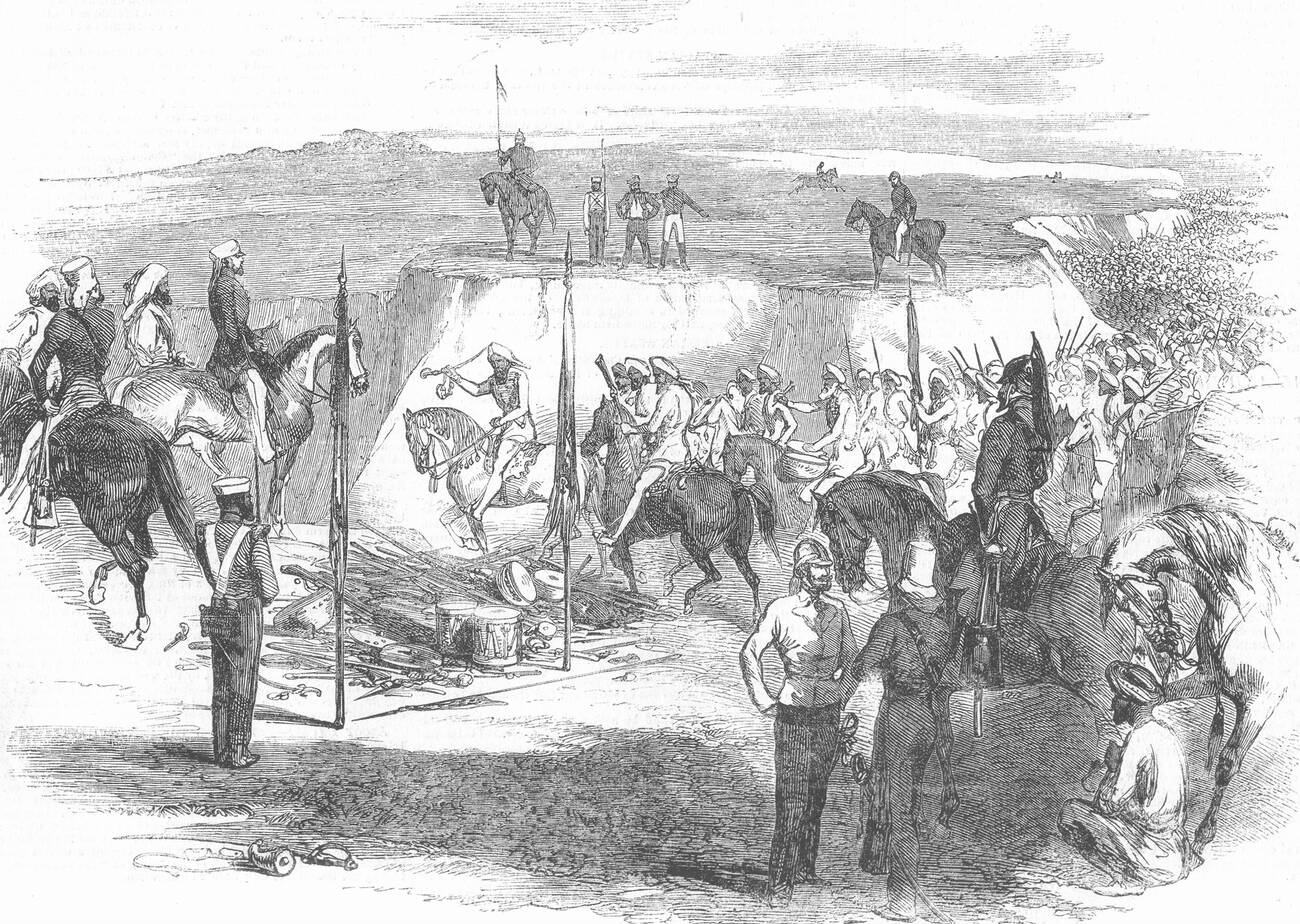
Took place in 1849.

Events in the year 1849 in India.

== Events ==
- 1 August – Great Indian Peninsula Railway was incorporated by an act of the British Parliament
- 2nd Sikh War, 1848-49.
- 29 March– Annexation of Punjab.
- Annexation of Jaitpur and Sambalpur.

== Law ==
- Admiralty Offences (Colonial) Act (British statute)
