= 1870 in India =

- Centuries: 17th; 18th; 19th; 20th; 21st
- Decades: 1850s; 1860s; 1870s; 1880s; 1890s
- See also: List of years in India; Timeline of Indian history

Events in the year 1870 in India.

== Incumbents ==
- Richard Bourke, 6th Earl of Mayo, Viceroy

== Events ==
- National income - ₹3,332 million
- The first submarine telegraph cable from UK landed in Bombay.
- The United Service Institution (USI) was founded
- Indian Reform Association was formed on 29 October with Keshab Chandra Sen as president. It represented the secular side of the Brahmo Samaj and included many who did not belong to the Brahmo Samaj. The objective was to put into practice some of the ideas Sen was exposed to during his visit to Great Britain.
- Singh Sabha Movement started in Amritsar to revive Sikh faith buy bringing back the converts.

== Law ==
- Court-Fees Act
- Coinage Act (British statute)
- Extradition Act (British statute)
- Foreign Enlistment Act (British statute)

== Births ==
30 April 1870 -- Dhundiraj Govind Phalke, known as Dadasaheb Phalke, the Father of Indian Cenema (Died 16 February 1944)
