= 1844 in India =

- Centuries: 17th; 18th; 19th; 20th; 21st
- Decades: 1820s; 1830s; 1840s; 1850s; 1860s
- See also: List of years in India; Timeline of Indian history

Events in the year 1844 in India.

== Incumbents ==
- The Viscount Hardinge, Governor-General, 1844–48.

== Law ==
- Judicial Committee Act (British statute)
