= 1875 in India =

- Centuries: 17th; 18th; 19th; 20th; 21st
- Decades: 1850s; 1860s; 1870s; 1880s; 1890s
- See also: List of years in India; Timeline of Indian history

Events in the year 1875 in India.

== Incumbents ==
- Thomas Baring, 1st Earl of Northbrook, Viceroy

== Events ==
- National income - ₹3,628 million
- India Meteorology Department was established on 15 January.
- Muhammadan Anglo-Oriental College, founded by Sir Syed Ahmed Khan in Aligarh (now Uttar Pradesh); later became Aligarh Muslim University in 1920.
- Albert Edward, the Prince of Wales, arrives in British India, on an official visit representing his mother Queen Victoria, the Empress of India, remaining there until the following year.
- 8 November – The Prince of Wales visits Bombay. Establishment of Arya SAMAJ
- 10 April - The Arya Samaj was founded by Swami Dayanand Saraswati.
- 9 July - Bombay Stock Exchange known as BSE, Indian stock market was founded

== Law ==
- Majority Act
- Tolls On Roads & Bridges Act

== Births ==
- 31 October – Sardar Vallabhbhai Patel, political and social leader (died 1950).
- 22 December – Nanda Kishore Bal, poet (died 1928).
