= 1846 in India =

- Centuries: 17th; 18th; 19th; 20th; 21st
- Decades: 1820s; 1830s; 1840s; 1850s; 1860s
- See also: List of years in India; Timeline of Indian history

Events in the year 1846 in India.

== Events ==
- 1st Sikh War, 1845–46.
- 9 March - the Treaty of Lahore was a peace treaty marking the end of the First Anglo-Sikh War. As a result, Maharaja Ranjit Singh ceded Kashmir to the British East India Company.
- 16 March, Treaty of Amritsar (1846), formalised the arrangements in the Treaty of Lahore between the British East India Company and Gulab Singh Dogra after the First Anglo-Sikh War, forming Jammu and Kashmir.

== Law ==
- Legal Practitioners Act
