= 1873 in India =

- Centuries: 17th; 18th; 19th; 20th; 21st
- Decades: 1850s; 1860s; 1870s; 1880s; 1890s
- See also: List of years in India; Timeline of Indian history

Events in the year 1873 in India.

== Incumbents ==
- Thomas Baring, 1st Earl of Northbrook, Viceroy

== Events ==
- National income - ₹3,441 million
- Bihar famine of 1873–74

== Law ==
- Indian Oaths Act
- Government Savings Promotion Act
- Government Saving Banks Act
- East India Stock Dividend Redemption Act (British statute)
- East India Loan Act (British statute)
- Indian Railway Companies Act (British statute)
- Extradition Act (British statute)
- Slave Trade Act (British statute)

== Births ==
- 19 December – Upendranath Brahmachari, scientist and medical practitioner (died 1946).
