= 1855 in India =

- Centuries: 17th; 18th; 19th; 20th; 21st
- Decades: 1830s; 1840s; 1850s; 1860s; 1870s
- See also: List of years in India; Timeline of Indian history

Events in the year 1855 in India.

== Incumbents ==
- James Broun-Ramsay, 1st Marquess of Dalhousie, Governor-General of India, 1848 to 1856
- Muhammad Said Khan, Nawab of Rampur from 1840 to 1855, died on 1 April
- Ghulam Muhammad Ghouse Khan, Nawab of the Carnatic, 1825–1855
- Balwantrao Raje Ghorpade, Raja of Mudhol State, December 1854-27 March 1862
- Thakur Sahib Jashwantsimhji Bhavsimhji, Rajput of Bhavnagar State, 1854–11 April 1870

== Events ==
- 30 June - Santhal rebellion against British rule in Damin-i-koh, Bengal Presidency.
- The British annexed Thanjavur Maratha kingdom
- Dinavartamani was established in Madras as a weekly Tamil-Telugu paper
- Bombay, Baroda and Central India Railway was incorporated to undertake the task of constructing a railway line between Bombay and Vadodara
- Rani Rashmoni funded construction of the Dakshineswar Kali Temple in Dakshineswar near Kolkata
- Central Museum of Natural History, Economy, Geology, Industry and Arts was established in Bombay
- Napier Museum, an art and natural history museum situated in Thiruvananthapuram, was established
- Madras Zoo opened
- Narayan Jagannath High School, the first government school established in Sindh, was established in Kerachi
- William Healey Dall moved to India to work as a missionary

== Law ==
- Legal Representatives Suits Act
- Fatal Accidents Act

== Births ==
- G. Subramania Iyer, leading Indian journalist, social reformer and freedom fighter who founded The Hindu, born on 19 January in Tiruvadi, Tanjore district
- A. Subbarayalu Reddiar, a landlord, Justice Party leader and Chief Minister or Premier of Madras Presidency from 17 December 1920 to 11 July 1921, born on 15 October in Madras
- N. G. Chandavarkar, born on 2 December in Honavar in the Bombay Presidency
- Sudhakar Dwivedi, Indian scholar in Sanskrit and mathematics, born in Khajuri, a village near Varanasi
- Hakim Abdul Aziz, prominent Unani physician, born in Lucknow
- Govind Ballal Deval, a Marathi playwright from Maharashtra
- Kottarathil Sankunni, author of Malayalam literature, was born on 23 March in Kottayam, Travancore
- Rashid-un-Nisa, first Indian women Urdu Novelist.

== Deaths ==
- Henry Valentine Conolly, British administrator in southern India, murdered by Moplah (Mappila - Muslim) insurgents at Collector's Residence at West Hill Bungalow, Calicut on 11 September
- Muhammad Said Khan, Nawab of Rampur from 1840 to 1855, died on 1 April
- Ghulam Muhammad Ghouse Khan, Nawab of the Carnatic
- Mahmud Gami, introduced in Kashmiri the Persian forms of the masnavi and ghazal
