= 1860 in India =

- Centuries: 17th; 18th; 19th; 20th; 21st
- Decades: 1840s; 1850s; 1860s; 1870s; 1880s
- See also: List of years in India; Timeline of Indian history

Events in the year 1860 in India.

== Incumbents ==
- Charles Canning

== Events ==
- National income - ₹4,100 million
- A new treaty between the Nizam of Hyderabad (a loyal ally during the rebellion of 1857) and the British.
- Mukkuthi Samaram led by Arattupuzha Velayudha Panicker in Alleppey, Travancore.

== Law ==
- Societies Registration Act
- Indian Penal Code
- Indian Securities Act (British statute)
- Admiralty Jurisdiction (India) Act
- Admiralty Offences (Colonial) Act (British statute)
- Superannuation Act (British statute)
- East India Loan Act (British statute)
- East India Stock Act (British statute)

== Births ==
- 10 August – Vishnu Narayan Bhatkhande, Indian classical musician (died 1936).
