= 1863 in India =

- Centuries: 17th; 18th; 19th; 20th; 21st
- Decades: 1840s; 1850s; 1860s; 1870s; 1880s
- See also: List of years in India; Timeline of Indian history

Events in the year 1863 in India.

== Incumbents ==
- James Bruce, 8th Earl of Elgin, Viceroy (till 20 November)
- Sir Robert Napier, acting Viceroy (21 November – 2 December)
- Sir William Denison, acting Viceroy (from 2 December)

== Events ==
- 20 November - James Bruce, 8th Earl of Elgin, the Viceroy of India died due to Cardiac arrest on his journey from Simla to Dharamshala.

=== Dates unknown ===
- Syed Ahmad Khan set up Victoria School at Ghazipur, precursor to Aligarh Movement

== Law ==
- Religious Endowments Act
- India Stock Certificate Act (British statute)
- Colonial Letters Patent Act (British statute)

== Births ==
- 12 January – Swami Vivekananda, chief disciple of Ramakrishna and founder of Ramakrishna Mission (died 1902).
- 13 July – Margaret Murray, Anglo-Indian Egyptologist, archaeologist, anthropologist, historian, and folklorist (died 1963 in the United Kingdom)
- 28 August – Mahatma Ayyankali, was a social reformer who worked for the advancement of those people in the then princely state of Travancore, British India, who were treated as untouchables (died 1941).
