= Bhanwar Pal Deo =

Maharaja of Karauli (1886–1927)

- Maharajadhiraj; Yadukul Chandra Bhal
- c. 1911

Maharaja of Karauli
- Reign: 14 August 1886 – 3 August 1927
- Predecessor: Arjun Pal II
- Successor: Bhom Pal Deo
- Born: 24 February 1864
- Died: 3 August 1927 (aged 63)
- Spouses: Hadiji (m. 1878; death 1897); Shekhawatji (m. 1880); Shekhawatji (m. 1889); Sajjan Kumari (m. 1898); Gaudji (m. 1900); Sengarji (m. 1902)
- Father: Arjun Pal II (adoptive); Durjan Pal (biological)
- Education: Mayo College

Bhanwar Pal Deo (24 February 1864 – 3 August 1927) was Maharaja of Karauli from 14 August 1886 until his death in 1927.

== Early life, family, and education ==
Bhanwar Pal Deo was born on 24 February 1864 to Durjan Pal, the Rao of Padampura. He was educated at Mayo College in Ajmer. He was the first student from Karauli to attend Mayo and attended that school from 16 March 1878 to 29 April 1879. He was adopted by his uncle Arjun Pal II, the Maharaja of Karauli. He married six times. He married firstly, in 1878, to Hadiji, daughter of Apji Ajit Singh of Koela; secondly, in 1880, to Shekhawatji, a daughter of Kushal Singh, the Raja of Khandela (Senior); thirdly, in 1889, to Shekhawatji, a daughter of Ajit Singh, Thakur of Mandawa (Senior); fourthly, in 1898, to Sajjan Kumari, daughter of Akshay Singh, the Raja of Banera; fifthly, in 1900, to Gaudji, a daughter of Raja Sheo Singh of Sheopur; and sixthly, in 1902, to Sengarji, a daughter of Rup Shah, the Raja of Jagmanpur. His first wife died on 19 April 1897; his second died before 1893; his third died after 1914; his fourth died after 1914; his fifth died after 1914; and his sixth died after 1914.

== Reign ==
Upon the death of Arjun Pal II, he succeeded him on the throne of Karauli on 14 August 1886. However, as before, the administration of the state remained in the hands of the State Council under the supervision of the Political Agent. In 1887, he was granted increased powers, subject to certain conditions, and when in 1889 the State's financial difficulties had been resolved and its debts cleared, he was invested with full administrative powers. He used to conduct the administration of the State with a Council, of which he was the President, and used to attend the council meetings, which were held once a week. He had constructed bridges over the rivers on the Hindaun Road and built the tanks of Madanpur and Rundh Ka Pura at a cost of nearly a lakh of rupees. He attended the Delhi Durbar of 1903. In 1904, he ceded, free of charge, certain lands to the British Government of India for the construction of the Nagda–Mathura railway. During his reign, the state accumulated substantial debts, and this prompted the Political Agent for the Eastern Rajputana States to assume control of its administration in 1906. During this time, the state coinage was replaced by the British currency. His ruling powers were restored eleven years later. His ruling powers were restored to him eleven years later, i.e. in 1917. On the outbreak of the World War I, he placed all the resources of his State at the disposal of the Crown.

== Interests ==
He was highly skilled in English and Urdu, and exceptionally fluent in Sanskrit. Even though he had a quiet personality and liked spiritual ideas, he was an intrepid hunter who had shot more than 250 tigers during his reign. He kept tigers as pets and was extensively painted and photographed with them.

== Death ==
He died on 3 August 1927 and was succeeded by Bhom Pal Deo to his title, rank and dignity on 21 August 1927.

== Honours ==
He was appointed Knight Commander of the Most Eminent Order of the Indian Empire in 1894 and Knight Grand Commander of the same order in 1897.
