= 1869 in India =

- Centuries: 17th; 18th; 19th; 20th; 21st
- Decades: 1840s; 1850s; 1860s; 1870s; 1880s
- See also: List of years in India; Timeline of Indian history

Events in the year 1869 in India.

== Incumbents ==
- Sir John Lawrence, Viceroy
- Richard Bourke, 6th Earl of Mayo, Viceroy (from 12 January)

== Events ==
- La Martinière Girls' School is founded in Lucknow.

== Law ==
- Divorce Act
- East India Irrigation and Canal Act (British statute)
- East India Loan Act

== Births ==
- 11 April – Kasturba Gandhi, wife of Mohandas Karamchand Gandhi (died 1944).
- 2 October – Mohandas Karamchand Gandhi, political and spiritual leader in India and the Indian independence movement, born (died 1948).

== Deaths ==
- 15 February - Ghalib, Persian and Urdu poet. (b. 27 December 1797)
