= Isabel Cooper-Oakley =

Indian Theosophist and author (1854–1914)

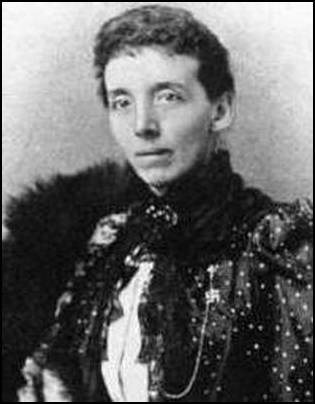
Isabel Cooper-Oakley c. 1884

Harriet Isabella (Isabel) Cooper-Oakley (31 January 1854 – 3 March 1914), was a prominent Theosophist and author.

She was born in Amritsar, India to (Frederic) Henry Cooper, C.B., commissioner of Lahore and his wife Mary (née Steel), receiving a good education because of her father's belief in the value of education for women. She had suffered a severe injury in an accident aged 23 which prevented her from walking for two years, during which time she intensified her reading. She went on to study at Girton College, Cambridge. Whilst at the university, she met — and later married — fellow student Alfred John Oakley. They then both changed their surname to Cooper-Oakley. Alfred stayed some years at Adyar, India, as an assistant to Henry Steel Olcott. He left to become Registrar of the University of Madras. Sometime in the late 1890s, G.R.S. Mead became her brother-in-law when he married her sister, another prominent Theosophist, Laura Cooper.

Isabel Cooper-Oakley died on March 3, 1914, at Budapest, Hungary.

== Works ==
- Count of Saint-Germain, ISBN 0-7661-0101-0
- The Count of St. Germain: Mystic and Philosopher, (1912) ISBN 1-4253-3280-3
- Masonry and Medieval Mysticism: Traces of a Hidden Tradition, ISBN 1-56459-643-5
- The Troubadours and Freemasonry, ISBN 1-4253-1617-4
- The Tradition of the Knights Templar Received in Masonry, ISBN 1-4253-1616-6
- Towards the Hidden Sources of Masonry, ISBN 1-4253-1615-8
- An Introduction to Masonry and Mysticism, ISBN 1-4253-1614-X
- Freemasonry and the Heavenly Kingdom of the Holy Grail, ISBN 1-4253-1618-2
- The Count of Saint-Germain and Tragical Prophecies, ISBN 1-4253-3281-1
- Masonic Tradition and the Count of Saint-Germain, ISBN 1-4253-3283-8
- Secret Writings and Ciphers, ISBN 1-4253-4024-5
- The Count of Saint-Germain and His Political Work, ISBN 1-4253-3282-X
- Mystical Traditions, ISBN 0-7661-0346-3
- Studies in the "secret doctrine"
- The Mystical Traditions and Masonry and Medieval Mysticism, ISBN 1-4254-5390-2
- Samkhya and Yoga Philosophy
