= 1845 in India =

- Centuries: 17th; 18th; 19th; 20th; 21st
- Decades: 1820s; 1830s; 1840s; 1850s; 1860s
- See also: List of years in India; Timeline of Indian history

Events in the year 1845 in India.

== Events ==
- 1st Sikh War, 1845–46.
- Grant Medical College opened in Bombay

== Law ==
- Meriah Sacrifices Act
- Governor General Act

== Deaths ==
- Daya Shankar Kaul Nasim, poet (born 1811).
