= Timeline of the Indian Rebellion of 1857 =

A timeline of the Indian Rebellion of 1857, which began as a mutiny of sepoys of the British East India Company's army on the tenth of May 1857 in the town of Meerut, and soon erupted into other mutinies and civilian rebellions largely in the Upper Gangetic plain and Central India.

== Timeline ==
=== 1857 ===
Events of 1857
Date	Event
26 February	Sepoys of the 19th Native Infantry at Berhampore refuse rifle practice
29 March	At Barrackpore, in Bengal, Mangal Pandey wounds two British mutiny of 34th Native Infantry
31 March	19th Native Infantry disbanded
8 April	Pandey hanged at Barrackpore
24 April	Troopers of the 3rd Bengal Light Cavalry at Meerut refuse orders to fire greased cartridges
2 May	Unrest at Ambala, 48th Mutiny at Lucknow
6 May	Part of the 34th Native Infantry disbanded at Barrackpore
8 May	Troops of the 3rd Bengal Light Cavalry found guilty by court-martial and given severe sentences
10 May	Mutiny and Murders at Meerut, troops head towards Delhi
11 May	Europeans, and Christians slaughtered in Delhi
13 May	Bahadur Shah Zafar proclaimed new Mughal emperor; British disarm the garrison at Lahore
17 May	Delhi Field Force, under George Anson, advances from Ambala
22 May	Peshawar garrison disarmed
20–23 May	Part of 9th Native Infantry mutiny at Agra
27 May	Anson dies of cholera; replaced by Major-General Sir Henry Bernard
30 May	Mutinies at Mathura and Lucknow
31 May	Rohilkhand and Bhurtpore army mutinies
4 June	Jhansi captured by rebels and handed over to Rani of Jhansi
5 June	Cawnpore 2nd Cavalry Mutinies
6 June	Cawnpore siege begins, Mutiny at Allahabad
7 June	Wilson and Bernard meet at Alipore
8 June	Battle of Badli-ki-Serai; Massacre at Jhansi
11 June	Lucknow police rebels; Neill arrives at Allahabad
25 June	Nana Sahib offers terms at Cawnpore
27 June	Satichaura Ghat Massacre at Cawnpore
30 June	British defeat at Chinhat; Lucknow Residency besieged
1 July	Mutiny at Indore
2 July	Arrival of Bakht Khan at Delhi
4 July	Sir Henry Lawrence dies at Lucknow
5 July	General Barnard dies of cholera; Major-General Thomas Reed succeeds as commander of the Delhi Field Force
7 July	Allan attacks Delhi leading to the slaughter of Delhi
12 July	Brigadier-General Sir Henry Havelock defeats rebels at Fatehpur, en route to Cawnpore
15 July	Allan goes to Barrackpore and assembles a large standing army of nearly 6000 men and prepares for battle
15 July	Havelock defeats rebels at Aong and near Pandu river at Cawnpore.
16 July	Nana Sahib defeated in first battle for Cawnpore
17 July	Sir Archdale Wilson replaces the ailing Reed as commander of the Delhi Field Force
27 July	Kunwar Singh welcomed pre-planed Dinapore cantonment rebellion army at Arrah
27 July	Ammunition is blocked from reaching citizens instead it is re-routed to Barrackpore
29 July	Havelock's victory at Unnao
30 July	First relief of Arrah fails
31 July	Lord Canning issues his controversial 'Clemency' resolution, by which he advises against the execution of mutineers not convicted of murder
3 August	Siege of Arrah ends after action by Major Vincent Eyre
5 August	Havelock's victory at Bashiratganj
12 August	Battle between Kher Singh and Ayer Dil, near Jagdishpur
13 August	Havelock withdrawal to Cawnpore; Colin Campbell, Anson's successor as Commander-in-Chief of India, arrives at Calcutta
14 August	John Nicholson arrives at Delhi Ridge
16 August	Havelock victory at Bithur
18 August	Rupees 10,000 announced by Patna commissioner E.A. Samuels to apprehend Kunwar Singh
17 August	Captain William Stephen Raikes Hodson defeats a large body of rebel cavalry near Rohtak
4 September	Siege train, proceeding from Punjab, arrives in the British camp outside Delhi
5 September	Suppression of the revolt starts as thousands are slaughtered and Allan moves to Bihar
14 September	Wilson's assault on Delhi begins, Nicholson wounded
15 September	Rebellion of Muzaffarpur announced to accept leadership of Babu Kunwar Singh
19 September	Havelock and Outram marches to Lucknow
20 September	Delhi captured and cleared of rebel troops
21 September	William Hodson captures Bahadur Shah
22 September	Hodson executes Mughal princes
23 September	Nicholson dies of wounds
25 September	First relief of Lucknow
10 October	Agra mutineers defeated
9 November	Kavanagh escapes from Lucknow
14–17 November	Second relief of Lucknow by Campbell
19 November	Women and children evacuated from Lucknow
22 November	British withdraw from Lucknow
24 November	Havelock dies of dysentery
26–28 November	Windham defeated at second battle of Cawnpore
29 November	Campbell reaches Cawnpore to join Windham
6 December	Tatya Tope defeated at second battle of Cawnpore
Sources: www.britishempire.co.uk and Saul David, The Indian Mutiny

=== 1858 ===
Events of 1858
Date	Event
6 January	Campbell reoccupies Fategarh
16 January	Hugh Rose begins campaign in central India
February	Campbell opens separate campaign for reconquest of Oudh
3 February	Rose relieves Saugor after a seven-month siege
2 March	Campbell returns to Lucknow
21 March	Last rebels removed from Lucknow
1 April	Dividing his force, Rose defeats a numerically superior army under Tatya Tope on the river Betwa
3 April	Jhansi captured and sacked
15 April	Walpole defeated at Ruiya
23 April	Rose enters Kalpi
5 May	Campbell victory at Bareilly
7 May	Rose defeats large force under Tatya Topi and the Rani of Jhansi at Kutch
22 May	Rose wins at Kalpi;end of operations in Rohilkhand; start of guerrilla warfare
28 May	Rao Sahib, Tatya Topi, the Rani of Jhansi and the Nawab of Banda enter Gwalior State with the remnants of their force and seize Gwalior on 1 June
5 June	Death of the Maulvi
12 June	James Hope Grant wins at Nawabganj in the final decisive battle in Oudh
17 June	Battle of Kotah-ki-Serai, death of Rani of Jhansi
19 June	Battle of Gwalior
2 August	Queen Victoria approves bill transferring administration of India from the East India Company to the Crown
1 November	Royal Proclamation replacing East India Company with the British Indian government and offering unconditional pardon to all not involved in murder or the protection of murderers
Source: www.britishempire.co.uk

=== 1859 ===
Events of 1859
Date	Event
4 January	Various Oudh leaders, including Nana Sahib, forced into the Nepal Terai by Hope Grant
7 January	Operations in Oudh declared officially over.
29 March	Bahadur Shah found guilty
7 April	Tatya Tope betrayed to the British,
18 April	Tatya Tope executed at shivpuri.
8 July	Peace officially declared.
Source: www.britishempire.co.uk
