= Charles Pelly (civil servant) =

Indian politician

- Born: 31 July 1812
- Died: 30 December 1885 (aged 73)
- Occupations: civil servant, Indian Civil Service
- Known for: member, Madras Legislative Council
- Spouse: Julia Henrietta Dobbs (m. 1839)
- Children: 9, incl Rear Admiral Francis Raymond Pelly
- Parents: Sir John Pelly, 1st Baronet (father); Emma Boulton (mother)

Charles Pelly (31 July 1812 – 30 December 1885) was a British civil servant of the Indian Civil Service who served as the revenue member of the Madras Legislative Council from 1862 to 1866. He was reappointed as an additional member in 1866.

== Personal ==
Pelly was the son of Sir John Pelly, 1st Baronet, and his wife, Emma Boulton. In 1839 at Toomcoor, Pelly married Julia Henrietta Dobbs, daughter of Rev. Richard Stewart Dobbs and his wife, Harriet Macauley. He and Harriet had nine children, one of whom was Rear Admiral Francis Raymond Pelly (1851–1907).

== Other sources ==
- K. C. Markandan (1964). Madras Legislative Council: Its Constitution and Working Between 1861 and 1909. S. Chand & Co.
- Madras (India, and Presidency). (1867) Board of Revenue. Village Revenue Establishments of the Madras Presidency. Ganz.
