= Pan American Society =

American organization based in New York City

The Pan American Society of the United States was established in 1910 in New York City. for "the promotion of the sentiment of brotherhood" among the American nations, and "especially the cultivation of good fellowship" between the people of the United States and those of Central America and South America. Elihu Root was suggested as the first president.

== See also ==
- Pan-Americanism
