= Madan Pal =

Maharaja of Karauli (1854 – 1869)

- Maharajadhiraj; Yadukul Chandra Bhal

Maharaja of Karauli
- Reign: c. 1854 – 17 August 1869
- Predecessor: Bharat Pal
- Successor: Lakshman Pal
- Born: c. 1830
- Died: 17 August 1869 (aged 38–39)
- Spouse: Phool Kanwar (m. 1865)
- Father: Sundar Pal

Madan Pal (1830 – 17 August 1869) was Maharaja of Karauli from 1854 until his death in 1869.

== Early life and family ==
Pal was born in 1830 to Sundar Pal of Hadoti. He was a descendant of Kirti Pal, son of Dharam Pal II, the Maharaja of Karauli. He married six times, including a daughter of Vrishbhan Singh Tanwar, and, in 1865, Phool Kanwar, a daughter of Sheo Singh, the Maharao of Sirohi.

== Succession ==
When Bharat Pal succeeded Nar Singh Pal to the throne of Karauli in 1852, a rival claim to the succession was advanced by a group of people on behalf of Madan Pal. His claim received the support of several princely states of Rajputana, including Jaipur, Bharatpur, Alwar and Dholpur. The dispute prompted the East India Company to order an inquiry, which found that Madan Pal was more closely related to Nar Singh Pal, that the latter's adoption of Bharat Pal had been informal, and that Madan Pal's claim was supported by Nar Singh Pal's widows and nine of the state's principal nobles. Before a formal decision could be issued in Madan Pal's favour, Bharat Pal died in 1854, whereupon Madan Pal succeeded to the throne of Karauli. Following which, his succession was accordingly recognized. As he was at the time in Jaipur, Henry Lawrence brought him back to Karauli and there, in 1854, installed him on the throne. This led him to develop great regard for Lawrence, and when he heard the news that Lawrence had died during the siege of Lucknow, he was so deeply grieved that he refused to eat for several days.

== Reign ==
He founded the Sadar Dispensary in 1854 and, in the same year, constructed a jail, as no permanent prison building had existed before his reign. During the Indian Rebellion of 1857, he supported the British and dispatched a contingent of troops to Kotah to suppress the rebels there. In response to John Russell Colvin’s request of 19 May 1857 that he take precautionary measures against rebel movements, he dispatched a detachment of 900 troops to assist the British forces stationed at Agra Fort. In 1858, when the British despatched their forces to Gwalior to combat a band of rebels advancing from Kalpi, he sent a detachment to guard the five fords across the Chambal river. He was prepared to send additional troops to Gwalior, but the British informed him that his current measures at the fords were sufficient. He also sent armed men to protect Seth Lakhmi Chand of Mathura from the rebels' plunder, and this allowed Seth to escape safely with his wealth. In recognition of his services, the British Government of India remitted the debt of 117,000 rupees he owed them, granted him a khilat (robe of honour), and permanently increased his gun salute from fifteen to seventeen guns. In 1862, the Government granted him a sanad, whereby it guaranteed him and his successors the right of adoption. He administered justice fairly and impartially, and twice a day anyone could approach him, and he used to personally hear those petitions. He also suppressed crime and kept practices such as sati and infanticide well under control. During a famine in his state, he obtained a loan from the government and spent between one and two lakh rupees from that loan to provide food for the poor. He also constructed bunds (embankments designed to control the flow of water) at Dabra and Malpura. However, he was extravagant and accumulated debts, due to which much of his reign was marked by financial difficulties. This led him to impose heavy taxes on his people. Consequently, in 1859, the Government appointed a political agent at Karauli to advise Pal on restructuring the state's finances, while expressly directing the agent not to interfere directly in the state's internal administration. In 1861, following the stabilisation of the state's finances, this agent was withdrawn by the Government. A council was appointed to assist him in administering the affairs of the state; however, it existed in name only, as he retained all authority and ruled independently. He frequently changed his Dewans, among whom were Ballu Ram, Sita Ram, and Vrishbhan Singh Tanwar.

He was also created a Knight Grand Commander of the Most Exalted Order of the Star of India.

== Death ==
He died of cholera on 17 August 1869 and was succeeded on the throne by Lakshman Pal, a son of his biological brother Bishan Pal.
