= Karauli State =

Indian princely state (1348 - 1949)

Coordinates: 26.3°N 77.23°E

- Princely State of British India
- 1348–1949
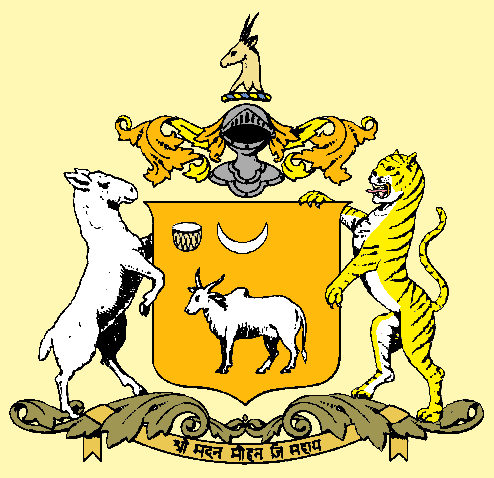
- Coat of arms

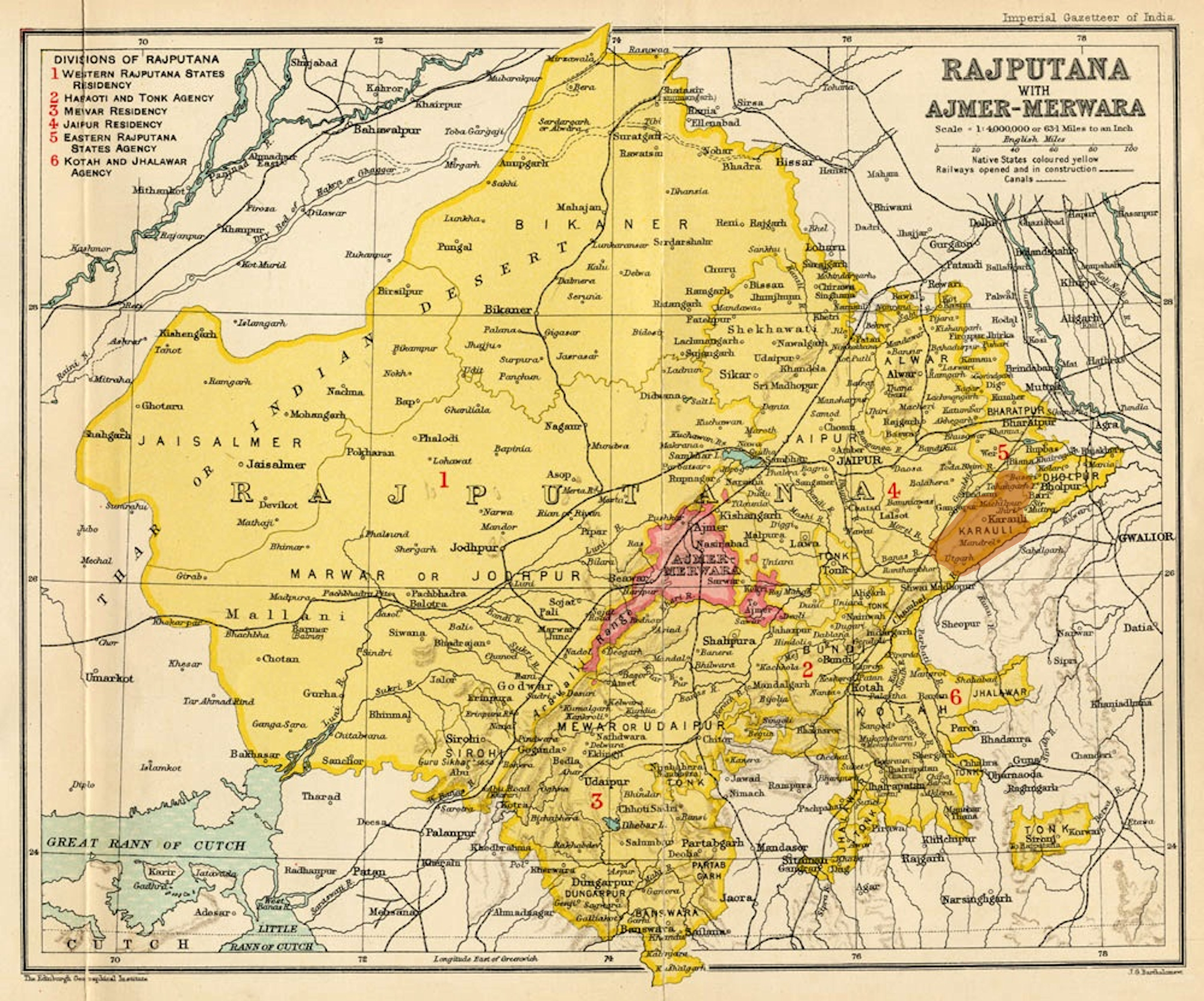
- Karauli State (orange) within Rajputana (yellow), in the Imperial Gazetteer of India (1909)
- Capital: Karauli
- Area
  - 1931: 3,216 km^{2} (1,242 sq mi)
- Population
  - 1931: 140,525
- History
  - Established: 1348
  - Indian independence: 1949
Succeeded by
Matsya Union
- Today part of: India · Rajasthan

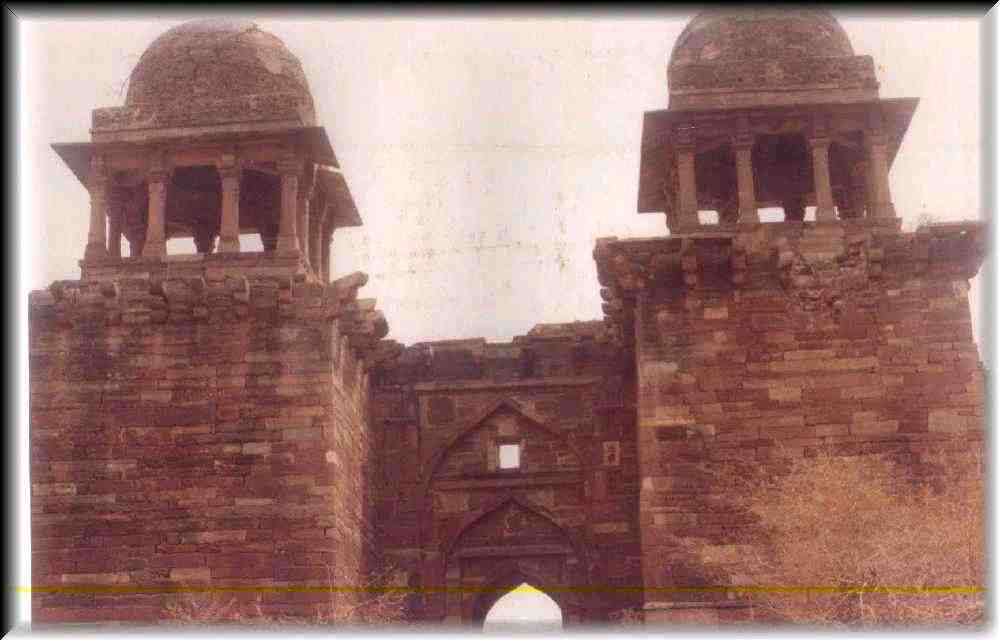
View of Timan Garh Fort in former Karauli State. Its foundations are said to have been built in the 2 century AD.

Karauli State was a princely state in the north eastern edge of modern-day Rajasthan, India from 1348 to 1949 ruled by the Jadaun Rajputs. The area of the former state is located in the cultural Braj region. Karauli was the capital while Mandrayal or Mandrail was another important town.

== History ==
The rulers of Karauli State belonged to the Jadaun clan of Rajputs and claimed descent from the Yaduvanshi lineage of the Chandravanshi dynasty. The founder of the dynasty was Raja Vijay Pal who came from Mathura and founded the fort of Bayana in 1040. Vijay Pal also came into conflict with the Ghaznavid tribes during his reign. Raja Timan Pal (r.1093-1159) was an early important ruler of the dynasty, who extended his domain by conquering the territories of modern-day Dang, Alwar, Bharatpur, Dholpur, Gurgaon, Mathura, Agra and Gwalior. Raja Arjun Pal Dev founded the new capital called "Kalyanpuri" which over time got the current name of Karauli in 1348. Sultan Mahmud Khilji of the Malwa Sultanate invaded and captured Karauli in 1454 which led the kingdom into a decline. The rulers of Karauli shifted to Untagarh and ruled a small territory. During Mughal Emperor Akbar's reign Raja Gopaldas of Karauli got back his ancestral capital of Karauli.

=== British era ===
Karauli signed a subsidiary alliance treaty with the East India Company on 9 November 1817.

The state under the rule of Maharaja Sir Ganesh Pal Dev along with the neighbouring states of Alwar, Bharatpur, and Dholpur acceded to the Dominion of India on 4 August 1947 to form Matsya Union. While being part of Matsya Union Karauli and others later merged with Greater Rajasthan in 1949 and became part of the current state of Rajasthan in the 1950s.

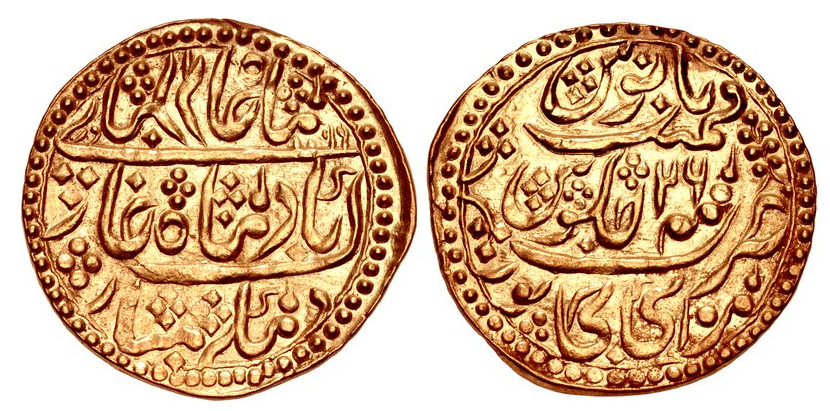
Coinage of Maharaja Manak Pal (1772–1804), Princely State of Karauli. Karauli mint. Struck in the name of the Mughal emperor Shah Alam II. Dated 1784-5 CE

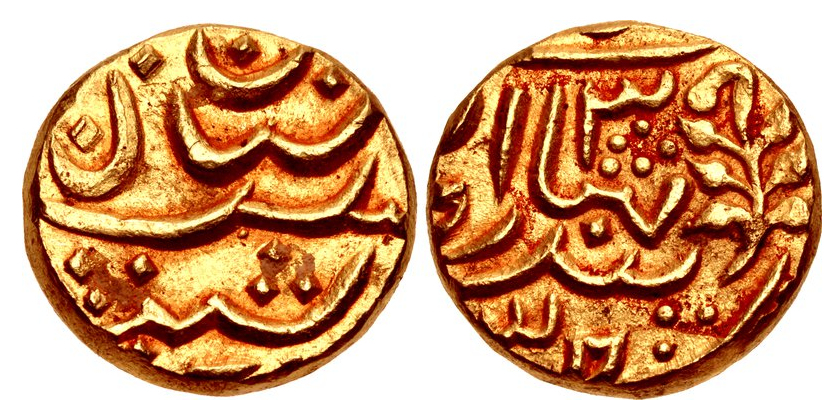
Karauli. Coinage of Maharaja Arjun Pal (1876-1886), Princely State of Karauli. In the name of Victoria, Queen of Great Britain and Empress of India. Dated 1878 CE.

Maharaja Madan Pal Dev was made a Grand Commander of the Order of the Star of India. The salute of honour, to which the Chiefs of Karauli were entitled, was also enhanced from 15 to 17 in appreciation of the loyal services of Maharaja Madan Pal Dev, who was also decorated with a rich dress of honour.

== Rulers ==
The rulers were:

- Dharam Pal
- Ratan Pal
- Kuwnar Pal
- Gopal Singh
- Tursam Pal
- Manik Pal
- Amolak Pal
- Harbaksh Pal
- Pratap Pal
- Narsingh Pal
- Bharat Pal
- Madan Pal
- Lakshman Pal
- Jaisingh Pal
- Arjun Pal
- Bhanwar Pal Deo
- Bhom Pal Deo
- Ganesh Pal Deo
