= Yadukul Chandra Bhal =

Indian princely title

Yadukul Chandra Bhal (lit. 'the Crown of the Yaduvansh') is a title borne by the Maharaja of Karauli.

== Background ==
Karauli, a state in the Rajputana Agency, covered an area of 1,260 square miles (3,263.385 square kilometres). The Maharaja of Karauli is the lineal descendant of Krishna and belongs to the Yadava family of Rajputs, of which family he is also recognised as the head. The Maharaja is therefore styled Yadukul Chandra Bhal.

Bhanwar Pal Deo

Bhom Pal Deo with his suite

Ganesh Pal Deo

Coat of Arms of Karauli

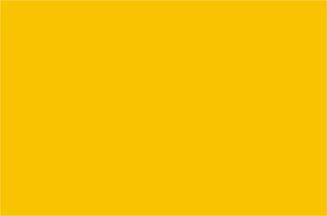
Flag of Karauli

Ganesh Pal Deo was the last ruling Maharaja of Karauli, who ceased being recognised as the ruler of Karauli by the Government of India, when an order to this effect was issued in 1970 by the President of India under Article 366(22) of the Constitution of India. However, upon his death in 1984, his grandson, Krishna Chandra Pal Deo, succeeded him.

== See also ==
- Chhatrala Yadupati
