= Timeline of Zemun history =

The following tables list the main events in history of Zemun (part of Belgrade, Serbia).

== Ancient times and Middle Ages ==
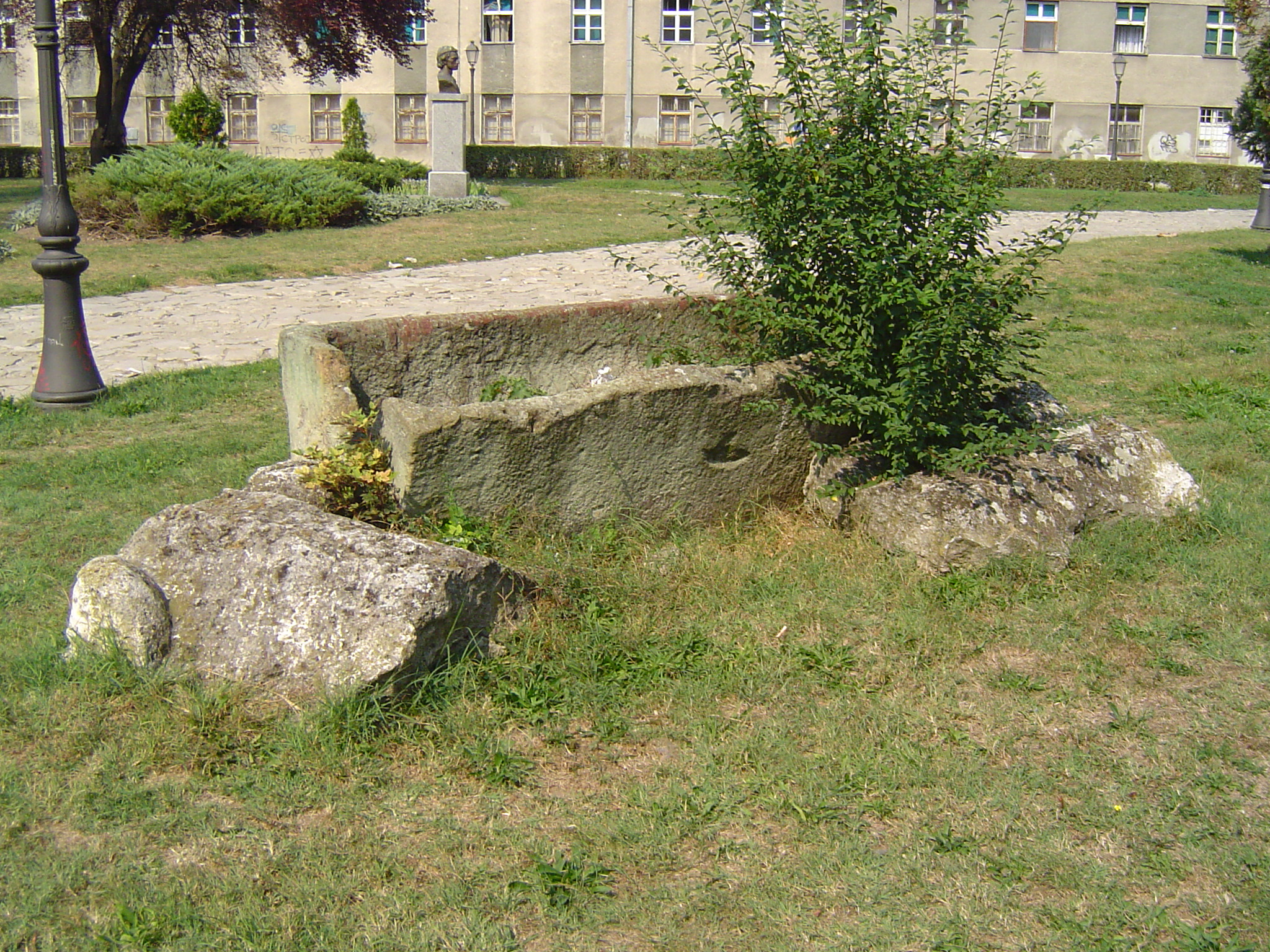
Remains of a Roman sarcophagus found in Zemun

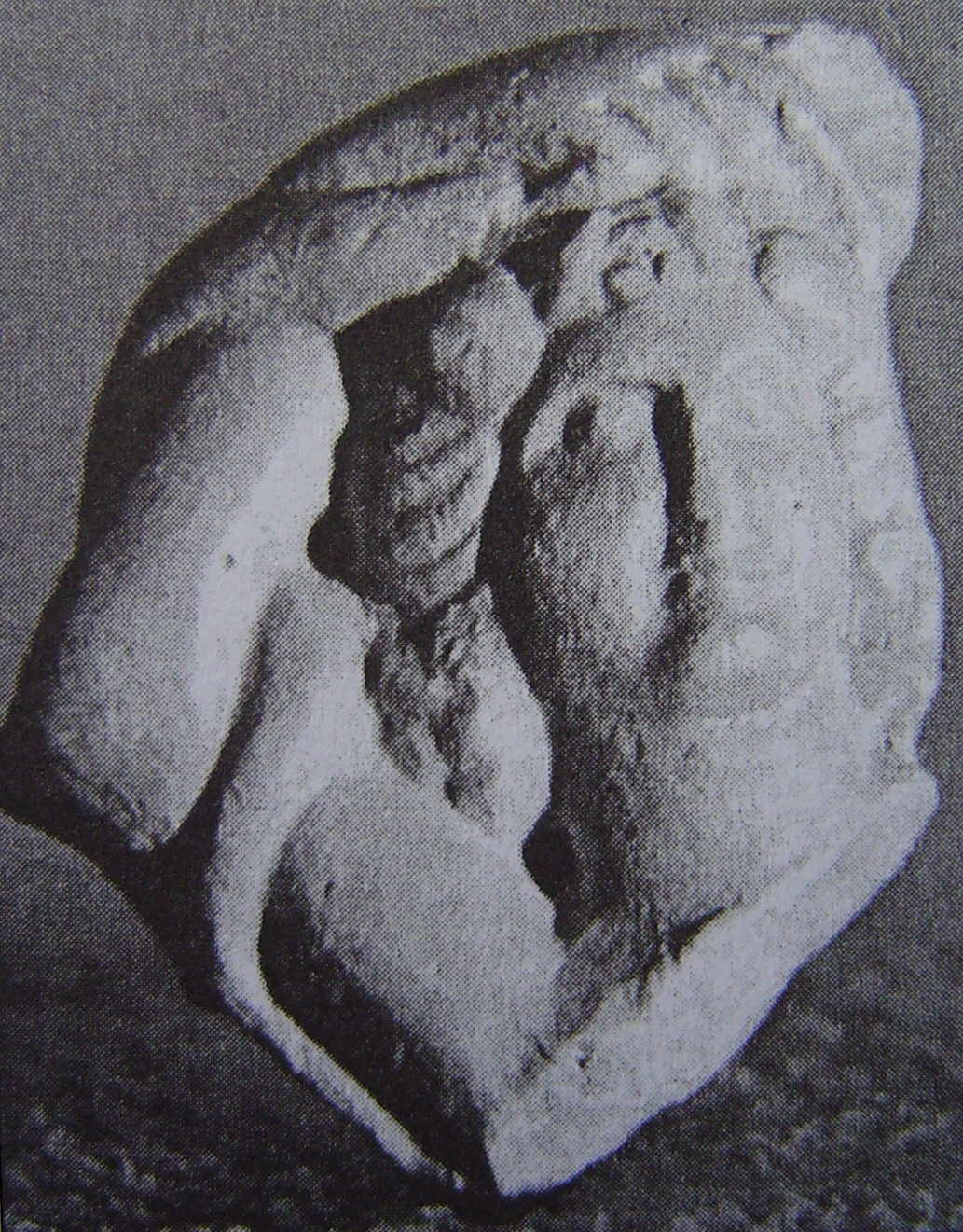
Relief of a maenad, found in Zemun

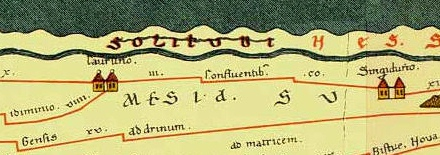
Taurunum on Tabula Peutingeriana

Dates	Events
Before Common Era	Neolithic settlement; Scordisci, Romans and Celts are mentioned as rulers of the area
1st quarter of 1st century CE	Romans found Taurunum, after a rebellion of Celts in 6–8 AD
1st century CE	Pliny mentions Taurunum as the second most important settlement in Syrmia
4th century CE	Taurunum appears on Tabula Peutingeriana, a map of Roman road network
around 440	Huns destroy Taurunum; no further mentioning of a settlement for several centuries
5th - 8th century	Ostrogoths, Lombards and Avars ruled the area
795	Franks conquer Syrmia; this was followed by colonization, including Zemun; however, it is unclear how the Francs called the settlement
827	Bulgarian Empire conquers Zemun and call it Земльн (Zemlyn - (town) made of earth)
end of 9th century	The Kingdom of Hungary conquers Zemun and call it Zimony
1018	Acquisition by the Byzantine Empire
1071	Kingdom of Hungary reconquers Zemun
1096	Crusaders of the First Crusade burn Zemun and kill 8,000 Zemuners; because they were routed at first, they call Zemun Malevilla (Evil Town)
1128	Kingdom of Hungary, under Stephen II, destroys Belgrade and use the masonry to reinforce Zemun fort
1151	Byzantines plunder and burn Zemun and reuse its masonry to reinforce Belgrade fortress; however, by the terms of peace treaty, Kingdom of Hungary retake Zemun
summer 1164	Byzantines burn Zemun and kill most of its inhabitants
1166	Kingdom of Hungary retakes Zemun
1241	Mongols conquer the area for a short while
1260	First mentioning of Franciscans in Zemun
1268	Serbs acquire Syrmia as a dowry by Elizabeth the Cuman, Hungarian princess to king Dragutin; Serbs call the town Земун (Zemun) - the name it bears today
1319	Kingdom of Hungary conquers Syrmia, including Zemun
1353	Serbian emperor Dušan conquers Syrmia
Around 1370	Reconquest of Syrmia by the Kingdom of Hungary
1396	Ottoman Turks plunder Zemun
1412	Zemun, along with some other towns, is acquired by Serbs, by the treaty between Serbian despot Stefan and Hungarian king Sigismund
1434	Kingdom of Hungary acquires Zemun as a dowry of Serbian despot Đurađ's daughter Catherine to Hungarian count Ulrich II of Celje
1453	Ottomans destroy the Franciscan church and convent in Zemun
Around July 10, 1521	Ottomans burn and plunder Zemun; it remains under their control for almost 200 years, with very few written traces from this period
August 1521	Ottoman sultan Suleiman the Magnificent spends the whole month in Zemun directing the siege of Belgrade
1573	First mentioning of an Orthodox church in Zemun

=== Historic rulers of Zemun up to 20th century ===
Taurunum
Земльн / Zimony / Semlin / Zemun / Земун
│
1
│
101
│
201
│
301
│
401
│
501
│
601
│
701
│
801
│
901
│
1001
│
1101
│
1201
│
1301
│
1401
│
1501
│
1601
│
1701
│
1801
│
1901

== Early modern period ==
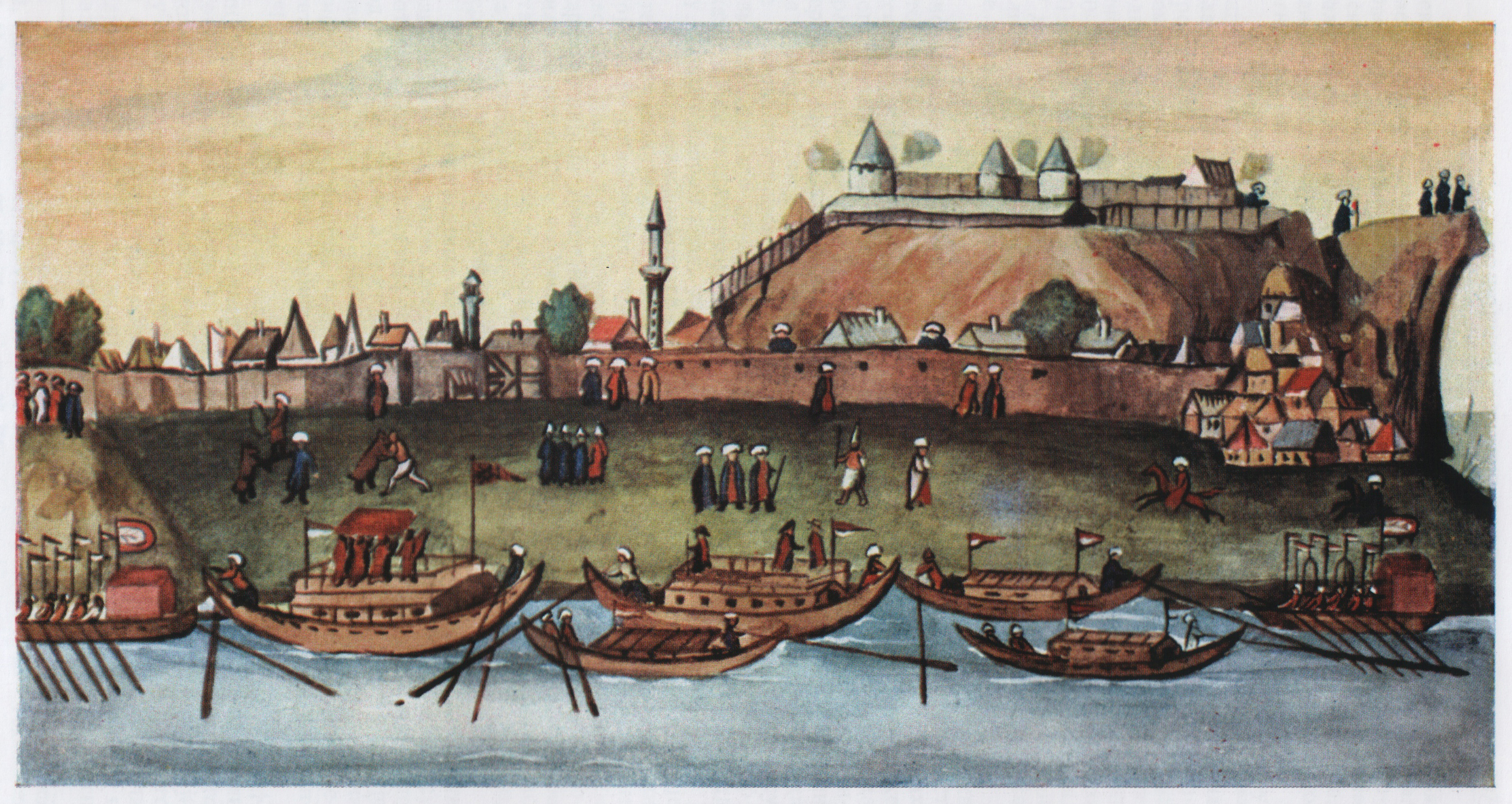
Ottoman Zemun in 1608

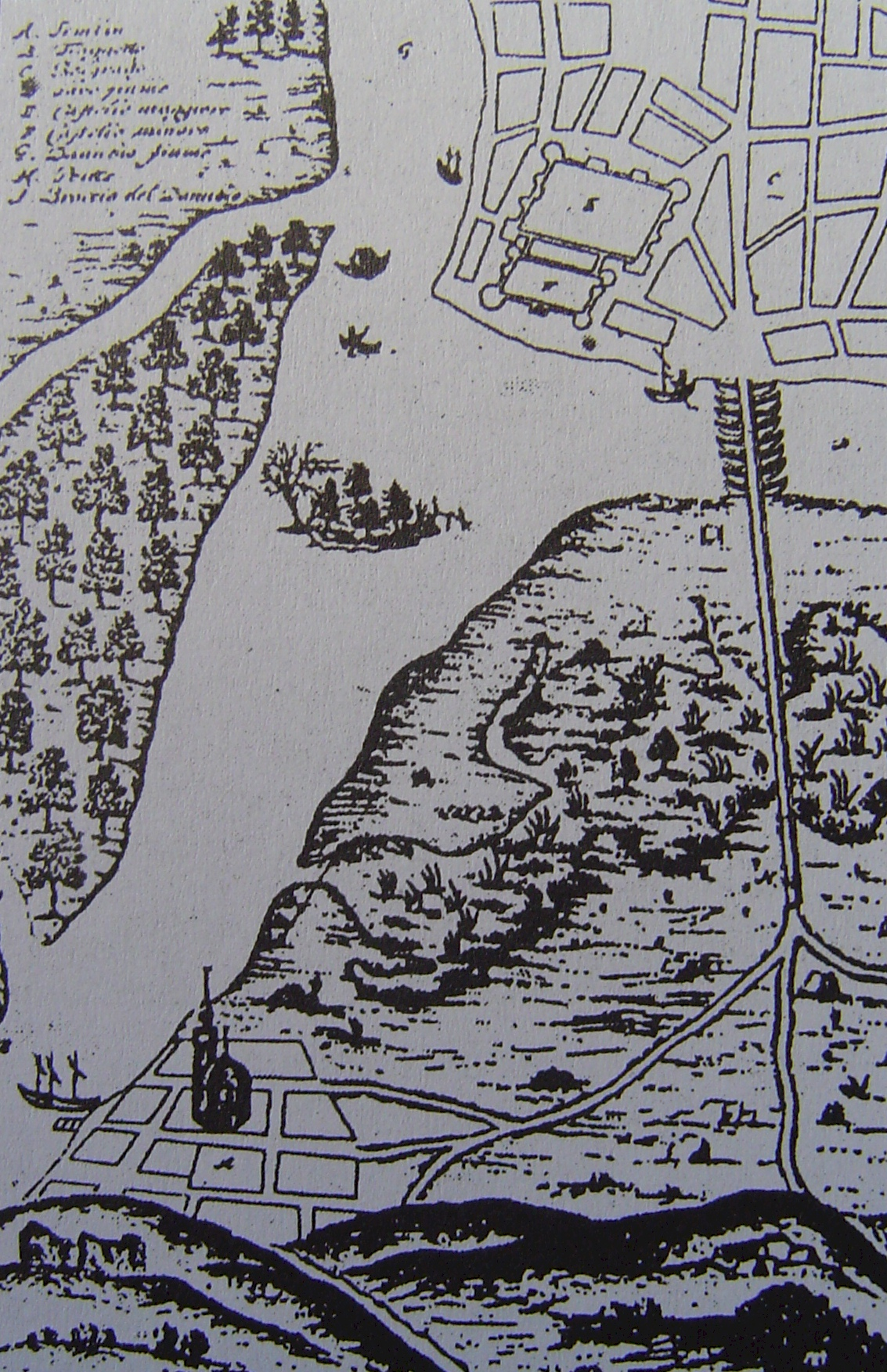
Map of Zemun from 1688

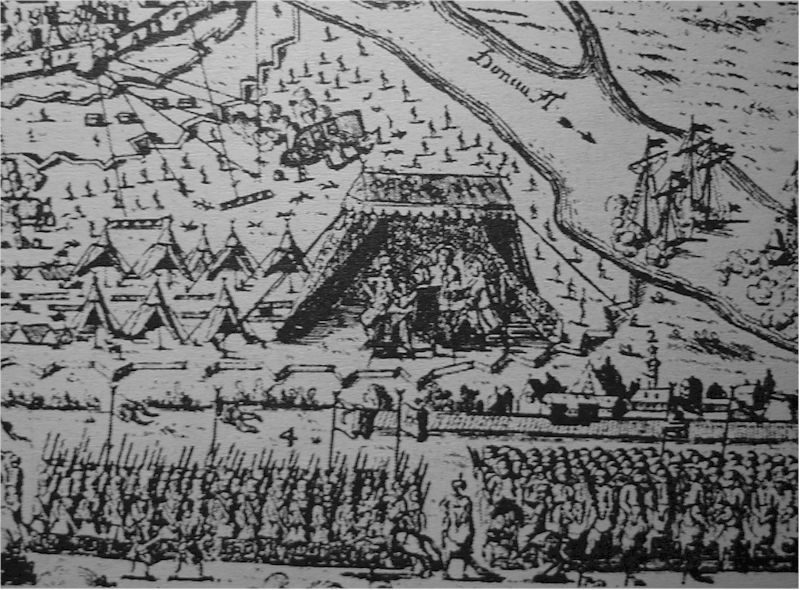
Signing of Belgrade Treaty

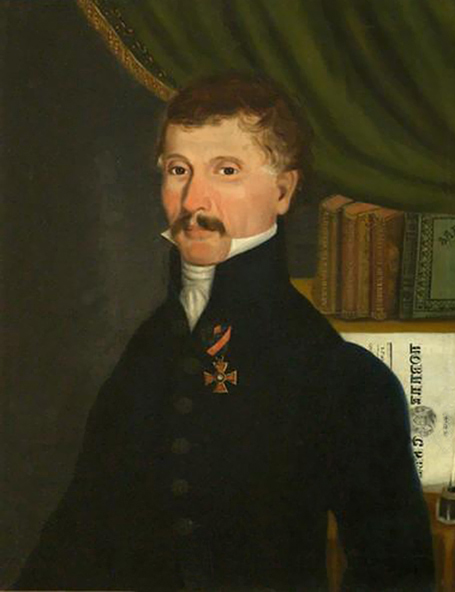
Dimitrije Davidović

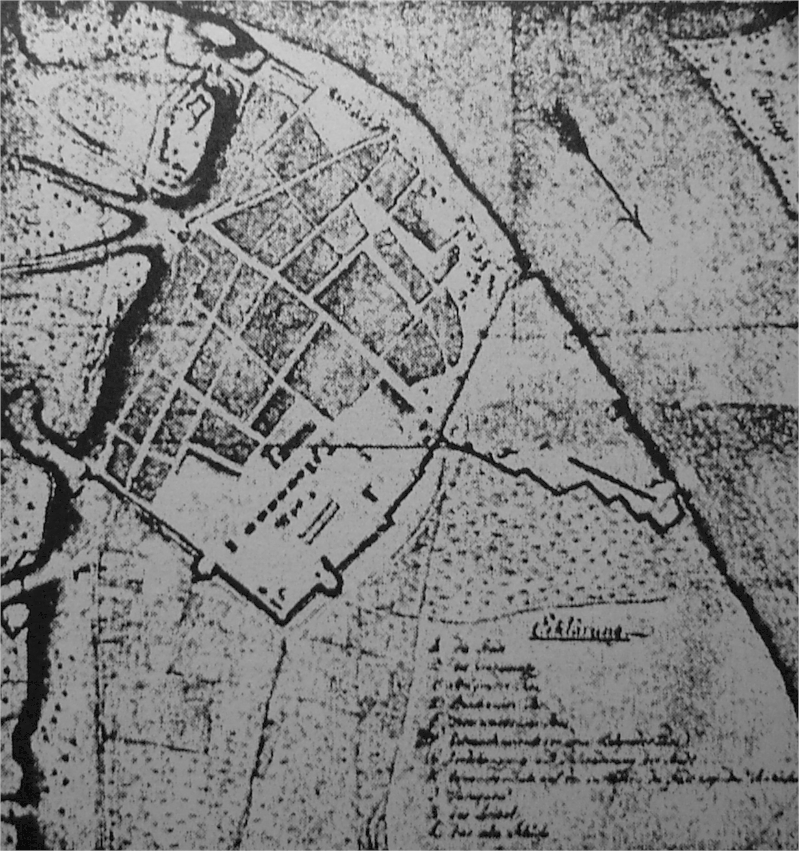
Zemun in 1791

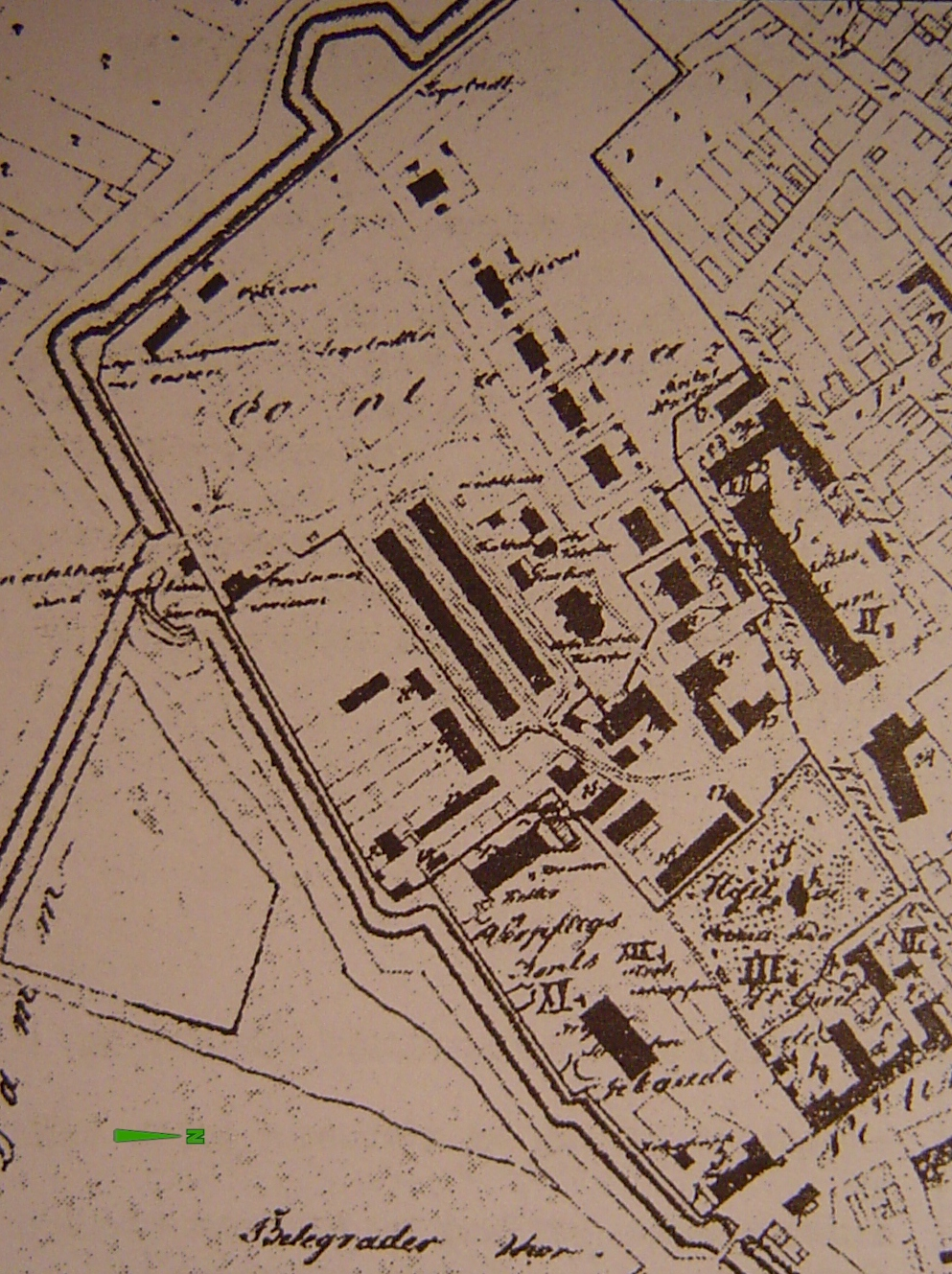
Map of Zemun Contumaz from 1830

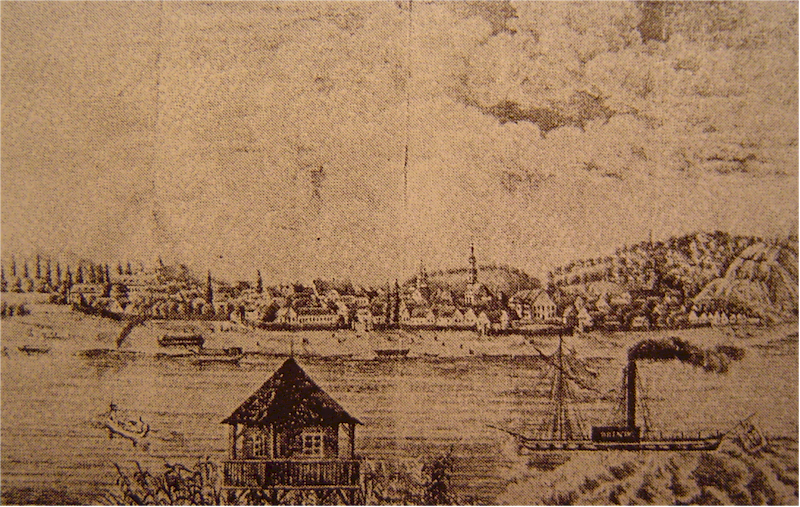
Zemun around 1850

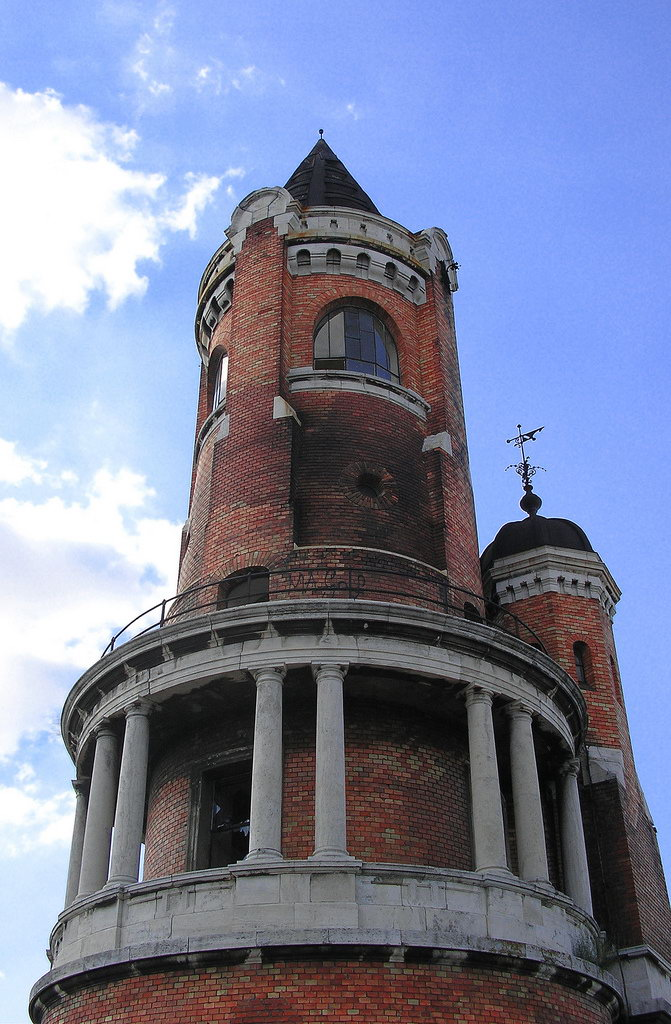
Millennium tower

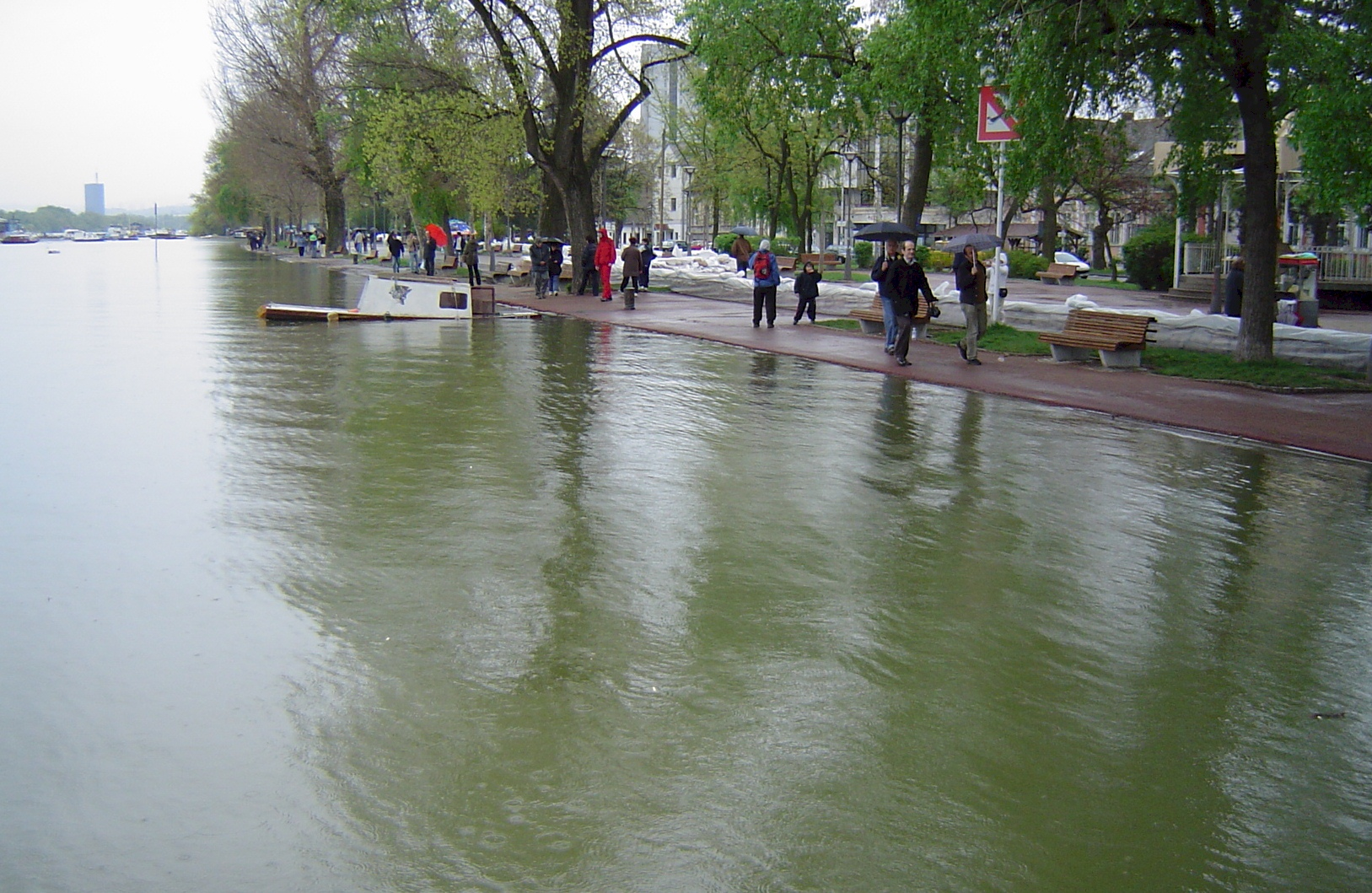
Danube at Zemun in April 2006

Dates	Events
1688	Habsburgs burn and plunder Zemun; they call it Semlin
1690	Ottomans retake Zemun
July 1, 1717	Eugene of Savoy conquers Zemun; it remained under the Habsburgs for the next 201 years
1728	First Zemun school is established by the friar order of Capuchins; Zemun and surrounding lands in Syrmia are given to Schönborn family
1730	A quarantine zone, so-called Contumaz is built (dismantled in 1842)
1739	Ottomans retake Belgrade; many Christians flee to Zemun
September 18, 1739	Treaty of Belgrade, between the Ottoman Empire and Habsburg Monarchy, is signed at Zemun bank of Sava
December 25, 1744	First Catholic mass is held in Zemun
1745	Zemun is part of the re-established Syrmia County in the Croatian Kingdom of Slavonia
1746	Zemun becomes part of Austrian Military Frontier
Autumn 1751	Zemun Community Magistrate, a local government institution, is formed; Marko Nikolić is appointed the first Town Mayor (officially: "Town Judge") in Zemun's history
1772	Census is held; Zemun has 3,829 inhabitants, 12 guilds, 2 taverns and 6 watermills
1776	First synagogue in Zemun is mentioned
1779	First brewery in Zemun is mentioned
1788	At the start of Austro-Turkish War, Austrian emperor Joseph II assembles troops at Zemun to conquer Belgrade; First street signs are put up
April 1789	First hospital in Zemun, and the oldest one in today's Serbia, is built
October 12, 1789	Dimitrije Davidović, the author of first Serbian Constitution and the establisher of first Serbian newspapers, is born in Zemun
1801	Zemun has 7,089 inhabitants (mostly Serbs, Germans, Greeks, Aromanians, Jews, etc.) and 1,464 families
October 18 to 20, 1817	Emperor Franz I visits Zemun; town's freshly established, German-populated suburb is named Franzthal in his honor
January 26, 1825	First library in Zemun, and the oldest one in today's Serbia, is established
April 1848	Along with other contemporary revolutions, citizens of Zemun forced the town government to give up their authority; after a brief period of anarchy, they formed the Town council; this lasted until August 1849. For most of the revolution, Zemun was the capital of Serbian Vojvodina
1848–1852	Representatives from Zemun were part of the Croatian Sabor
July 5, 1852	Emperor Franz Joseph I visits Zemun
1853	Telegraph service was established between Zemun, Petrovaradin and Kikinda
September 23, 1858	Zemun High School is officially established; initially, it has 21 students
May 29, 1867	Austrian Empire transforms into Austria-Hungary
January 1, 1871	Zemun is proclaimed Free Imperial Town; Community Magistrate is replaced by Town Government
April 1876	Eastern parts of Zemun are flooded by Danube; damage is estimated to 150,000 forints
1879 to 1886	In the place where Contumaz stood, Town Park (Gradski park) of 7.7 hectares is planted
1881	Zemun and the Croatian-Slavonian military frontier is incorporated into the Triune Kingdom of Croatia, Dalmatia and Slavonia
December 10, 1883	Railway track between Budapest and Zemun is finished; one year later, Zemun is also connected to Belgrade
1886 to 1889	Zemun quay, a several kilometres long levee, is built
spring 1895	Once more, Danube flooded Zemun; this time, the damage was estimated to 200,000 forints
1896	Millennium Tower is erected in Zemun, to mark 1000 years of Hungarian state; today, the tower is the most famous Zemun landmark
December 1900	Electric street lighting is installed and put to function

== 20th and 21st century ==
Dates	Events
1904	First cinema showing; Zemun's first movie theatre was opened in 1908
July 28, 1914	World War I begins with shelling of Belgrade (Serbia) from Zemun (Austria-Hungary); On September 10, Serbian army enters Zemun, but is forced to retreat three days later
October 29, 1918	Kingdom of Croatia, Dalmatia and Slavonia declares independence from Austria and Hungary and enters the State of Slovenes, Croats and Serbs with Zemun part of it.
November 5, 1918	Serbian army enters Zemun
November 25, 1918	Great National Assembly of Serbs, Bunjevci and other Slavs declared joining of the province of Banat, Bačka and Baranja with Kingdom of Serbia mentioning Syrmia, but was disputed by the National Council of the State of Slovenes, Croats and Serbs.
December 1, 1918	The State of Slovenes, Croats and Serbs (with Zemun part of it) entered a union with the Kingdom of Serbia to form Kingdom of Serbs, Croats and Slovenes
April 1919	The famous Simplon-Orient-Express train connecting Paris to Istanbul starts running through Zemun daily; the original Orient Express had been running through Zemun since 1885
1921	A census is held; Zemun has 18,528 inhabitants
March 25, 1927	A civil/military airfield, the first in Kingdom of S, C. and S., begins operation on the outskirts of Zemun; the first domestic commercial flight (Zemun–Zagreb) was on February 15, 1928
1928	Kingdom's Air Force Headquarters are situated in Zemun
January 6, 1929	Kingdom of S, C. and S. is renamed to Kingdom of Yugoslavia
1932	Faculty of Agriculture And Forestry is moved to Zemun
April 1, 1934	Zemun becomes a municipality of the City of Belgrade
1935	In January, Zemun gets connected to Belgrade by a bus line across the newly built King Alexander Bridge; on November 5, a tram line also connects Zemun to Terazije
April 6, 1941	Nazi Germany bombs Belgrade in World War II; Zemun remains almost intact but King Alexander Bridge is destroyed by the defenders
April 12, 1941	Axis forces enter Zemun; on October 10 it becomes part of Independent State of Croatia
December 1941	On Zemun bank of the Sava, Sajmište concentration camp (officially: Judenlager Semlin) is built; more than 10,000 people perish in it until September 1944, when it was dismantled
July 27, 1942	Nazis deport the remaining Zemun Jews to extermination camps of Jasenovac and Stara Gradiška
April to September 1944	Belgrade and Zemun are heavily bombed by Allied Forces
October 22, 1944	Partisans and Red Army enter Zemun; it becomes part of Democratic Federal Yugoslavia (since 1945, Federal People's Republic of Yugoslavia)
October 22, 1945	Once again, Zemun becomes a municipality of City of Belgrade
1952	A part of Zemun municipality is seceded to form Novi Beograd
September 9, 1952	In Yugoslavia's worst ship disaster, more than 90 people perish as passenger ship Niš sinks in a hailstorm on its regular route from Belgrade to Zemun
October 20, 1956	First trolleybus line connecting Belgrade and Zemun starts operating via Brotherhood and Unity Bridge; trolleybus lines to Zemun were abolished in 1973
April 28, 1962	A new, larger airport begins operation in Zemun municipal territory; the old airfield ceases operation in 1964
April 1963	FPRY is renamed to Socialist Federal Republic of Yugoslavia
1950s – 1980s	Along with Belgrade's population boom, the population of Zemun triples as many new neighbourhoods are built
April 27, 1992	After the breakup of SFRY, Serbia and Montenegro form Federal Republic of Yugoslavia
23 June 1995	The Grmeč factory explosion kills 11 workers.
mid-1990s	Some 40,000 refugees of Yugoslav wars settle in Zemun municipality
April 1999	Air Force headquarters is damaged and military barracks in Zemun are destroyed in NATO bombing of Yugoslavia
February 4, 2003	Federal Republic of Yugoslavia is renamed Serbia and Montenegro
March 12, 2003	Serbian Prime Minister Zoran Đinđić is assassinated in Belgrade; many of the conspirators belonged to Zemun Clan
November 24, 2003	A large area of Zemun municipality is seceded to form Surčin municipality
March 16, 2006	Belgrade is elected Southern European City of the Future
April 2006	The Danube rises to the very edge of Zemun quay, but doesn't flood it, except at its few lowest points
June 5, 2006	After the secession of Montenegro, Republic of Serbia proclaims independence
October 2011	Census, the last one to date, is held; town of Zemun has over 150,000 inhabitants and municipality – over 165,000
December 18, 2014	Pupin Bridge, Zemun's first ever permanent bridge across the Danube is opened for traffic

(Austria-Hungary)
(Kingdom of Yugoslavia)
(Independent State of Croatia)
(Democratic Federal Yugoslavia)
(Socialist Federal Republic of Yugoslavia)
(Federal Republic of Yugoslavia)
(Serbia)
│
1901
│
1911
│
1921
│
1931
│
1941
│
1951
│
1961
│
1971
│
1981
│
1991
│
2001
│
2011
│
2021

== See also ==
- Zemun
- Timeline of Belgrade history

== Sources ==
- Petar Marković - „Zemun od najstariji dana pa do danas“, Zemun, 1896; reprinted 2004, ISBN 86-84149-08-4
- „Hrvatska revija“ - „Hrvatska strana Zemuna“, 2004
- Statistical Office of Serbia - "Census in Serbia 2011 – First Results"
