= 2000 Pingxiang steel plant explosion =

Industrial disaster in Jiangxi, China

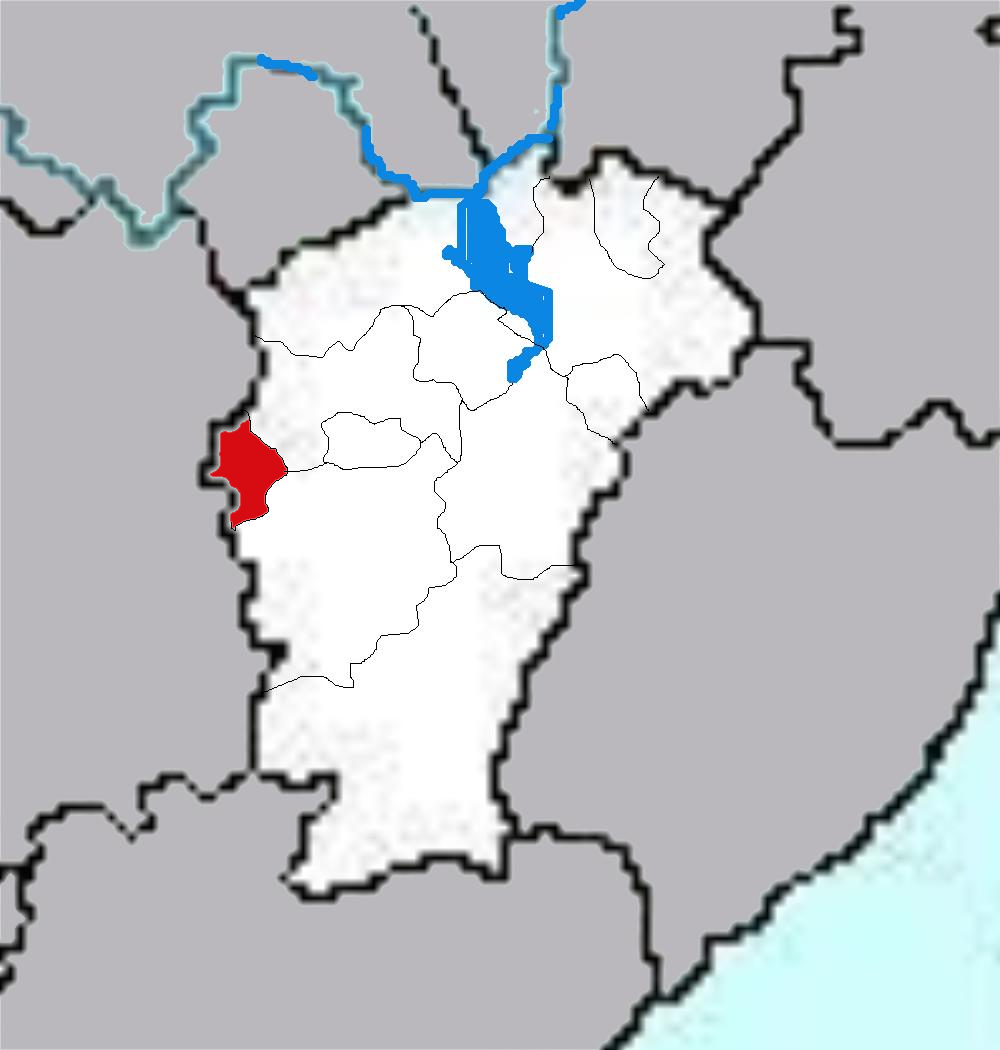
- The location of Pingxiang in Jiangxi, China
- Date: 2000
- Location: Pingxiang, Jiangxi, China
- Deaths: 19
- Injuries: 24

The Pingxiang steel plant explosion occurred on August 21, 2000, when an oxygen generator in a steel plant located in Pingxiang, Jiangxi, China, exploded. At least 19 steel workers were killed as a result of the incident.

== See also ==
- Qinghe Special Steel Corporation disaster
- List of industrial disasters
