= 2020 Dahej chemical plant explosion =

2020 chemical plant explosion in Dahej, India

- Date: 3 June 2020
- Location: Dahej, Gujarat, India
- Also known as: Dahej chemical factory blast
- Deaths: 5
- Injuries: 57

On 3 June 2020, the explosion occurred at the Yashashvi Rasayan Pvt. Ltd. chemical factory at Dahej in Gujarat, India, around 12:00 hours.

Five people were killed and 57 were injured in the explosion.

== See also ==
- 2020 Ahmedabad chemical factory blast
- Visakhapatnam gas leak
- List of industrial disasters
