= 1983 Newark explosion =

Industrial accident in Newark, New Jersey

Coordinates: 40°42′48″N 74°7′40″W

- Date: January 7, 1983
- Time: 12:15 am EST
- Location: Doremus Ave, Newark, New Jersey, United States
- Deaths: 1 dead
- Injuries: 24 injured

On January 7, 1983, at approximately 12:15 am, the city of Newark, New Jersey experienced an explosion due to a human error at the Texaco Farms fuel storage facilities. After an intense investigation, the Newark Fire Department concluded that there was no foul play; instead an accidental ''spillage or overfilling'' caused the explosion of three gasoline storage tanks at the facility. Further investigation by the company indicated that workers had failed to monitor a pipeline delivery of gasoline to a tank, violating Texaco operations manuals that called for checks of the gauge.

As a result of this failure, a vapor cloud formed, caused by the overflow of about 150,000 US gallons (570,000 L; 120,000 imp gal) of gasoline. Approximately 3,000,000 US gallons (11,000,000 L; 2,500,000 imp gal) of fuel spilled, and the flames rose up to 1,000 feet (300 m). The blast was felt up to 100 miles (160 km) away, in areas including White Plains, New York, and Southport, Connecticut.

The blast injured 24 people and killed one employee, and caused property damage to facilities nearby. Due to its size, the fire continued for three days until it was at a more manageable and less life-risking level.

== Texaco Farms ==
The Texaco Farms located on Doremus Avenue is an expanse of land on which a number of fuel oil storage tanks are located. Newark held roughly 40 tank farms, each holding about 3,142 million US gallons (1.189×10^{10} L; 2.616×10^{9} imp gal) of fuel. The tanks used in Texaco Farms did not have proper safety measures such as alarms that would indicate when a tank was reaching its capacity and would automatically shut down any further flow into the tank. Instead, as a part of company procedure, someone was to check the gauge. After the explosion, both the Newark Fire Department and Texaco USA investigated the incident. Christopher Kiersted, manager of public relations for Texaco USA in Houston, explained in an interview that the company’s investigation concluded that a number of employees failed to follow operating procedures.

== Effects ==
=== Blast radius ===
The blast was heard and felt through most of northern New Jersey and in several New York boroughs, including Manhattan, Queens, and Brooklyn. Residents in Mount Sinai, New York, 75 miles (121 km) away, called the police force, as well as residents of White Plains, Port Jefferson and many towns on the north shore of Long Island, Orangetown in Rockland county, Westchester, Nassau County, and Suffolk County. Additionally, police received reports from residents of Connecticut, including Stamford, Greenwich, Southport (which is 55 miles (89 km) east of Newark), and Preston (130 miles (210 km) away from the blast).

=== People ===
The explosion killed 1 employee and injured 24 people. William Van Zile was 40 years old and lived in North Arlington, New Jersey, when he died. Zile had been working at the Texaco Oil Tank Farm when, while walking with another employee, the full impact of the blast hit him, causing fatal burns. Twelve workers were at Oak Island Conrail Freight Yard, only a few hundred yards west of the explosion, when the tank exploded. All twelve workers were sent to St. James Hospital, although only three had to be treated for injuries. James Kandrach, 36, of Chatham, New Jersey, was admitted for deep lacerations on his scalp, while Peter O’ Donnell, 40, also from Chatham, was admitted for smoke inhalation and Bob Rose, 24 was treated for lacerations and a hole in the ear drum from the explosion. In total, 16 people were sent to St. James for treatment including the 12 workers from Oak Island Conrail Freight Yard. Five people were treated at Newark Beth Israel Hospital and later released. In Jersey City, about 3 1/2 miles (5.6 km) away, two people including a three-year-old boy went to Jersey City Medical Center for cuts from shattered windows and also released. Finally, one person was treated at University Hospital (UMDNJ, now Rutgers New Jersey Medical School). The Texaco Farms invited any customers with any damage to file a claim.

=== Investigation ===
The Texaco Oil Tank Farm’s Houston G. Ingram was the spokesman for Northeast Texaco, USA, which was the division of Texaco that operated the Newark Terminal. Ingram spoke and released information about the investigation that Texaco held for the explosion. While the Newark Fire Department's Director, John P. Caulfield, also released information from their investigation of the explosion, the two investigations aligned, stating that the explosion was caused by an overflow that would cause vapor to travel to an incinerator, ignite, and explode.

Many employees failed to follow shut off instructions for when the valve is overflowing. About a month after the explosion five employees were fired. The Newark Fire Company’s investigation stated that no one person could have been responsible for the fire. Two of the men who were fired, Robert J. Suter and Udell Evans, had both worked twenty-three years at the company. Suter was the shift supervisor at the time, and had left at 7pm, but was still fired even though the fire occurred later at 12:15am. As such, Suter believed he was being used as a scapegoat. The fire director stated, “they were aware of the overflow, and they did take precautions to shut it down.”

"The tank that overflowed had the capacity of 1.8 million US gallons (6,800,000 L; 1,500,000 imp gal) of gasoline. It was not equipped with an automatic shut off valve or an electronic device to detect overflow. Even if these workers wanted to shut off the tank and prevent the overflow, the tanks were not designed to do so."

== See also ==
- 2015 Tianjin explosions, a similar explosion in China
- List of industrial disasters
- Largest artificial non-nuclear explosions
- List of accidents and disasters by death toll
