= List of industrial disasters =

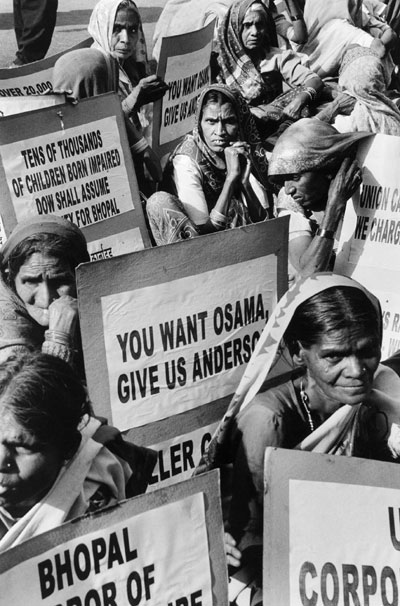
Victims of the 1984 Bhopal disaster march in September 2006, demanding the extradition of the American businessman Warren Anderson. It is considered the worst industrial disaster in history, killing 3,700 to 16,000 persons.

This article lists notable industrial disasters, disasters caused by industrial companies, either by accident, negligence or incompetence. They are a form of industrial accident where great damage, injury or loss of life is caused.

Other disasters can also be considered industrial disasters, if their causes are rooted in the products or processes of industry. For example, the Great Chicago Fire of 1871 was made more severe by the heavy concentration of lumber industry facilities, wood houses, and fuel and other chemicals in a small area.

The Convention on the Transboundary Effects of Industrial Accidents is designed to protect people and the environment from industrial accidents. The Convention aims to prevent accidents from occurring, to reduce their frequency and severity, and to mitigate their effects. The Convention addresses primarily industrial accidents in one country that affect the population and the environment of another country.

== Defense industry ==
- October 12, 1654: Delft Gunpowder Explosion, Delft, The Netherlands. A gunpowder depot in the center of Delft exploded, killed over 100 people, and destroyed a large part of the city center.
- August 31, 1794: Grenelle gunpowder explosion, Paris, France. 530–1,000 people killed in the explosion of Château de Grenelle's gunpowder depot.
- July 14, 1847: Faversham Guncotton Explosion. Faversham, United Kingdom. 18 killed during manufacture of guncotton.
- September 17, 1862: Allegheny Arsenal explosion, Lawrenceville, Pennsylvania. Three explosions killed 78 workers. The largest civilian disaster during the American Civil War.
- June 17, 1864: 1864 Washington Arsenal explosion in Washington, D.C. Exploded flares entered a nearby building which blew up when a barrel of gunpowder exploded, killing 21 women and injuring many others.
- May 25, 1865: Mobile magazine explosion, Mobile, Alabama. A warehouse containing 200 tons of powder and shells exploded, killing 300 and causing over $720,000 in property damage.
- August 11, 1871: Stowmarket Guncotton Explosion. Stowmarket, UK. During manufacture of guncotton, two explosions killed 28 and injured 70.
- April 2, 1916: Faversham Munitions Explosion. Faversham, UK. 200 tons of TNT caught fire, killing 115 people.
- December 6, 1917: The Halifax Explosion. Halifax, Canada. A ship loaded with about 9,000 tons of high explosives destined for France caught fire after a collision in Halifax harbour, and exploded. The explosion killed about 2,000 and injured about 9,000.
- July 1, 1918 National Shell Filling Factory, Chilwell. 134 workers were killed and 250 injured when eight tons of TNT detonated at a munitions factory at the village of Chilwell, now a suburb of Nottingham, UK.
- October 4, 1918: T. A. Gillespie Company Shell Loading Plant explosion. An ammunition plant in Sayreville, New Jersey, exploded, killing approximately 100 people, destroying 300 buildings and causing $18 million in damages.
- March 1, 1924: 1924 Nixon Nitration Works disaster. A plant for processing ammonium nitrate in Edison, New Jersey, exploded, killing 24 people, injuring 100 and destroying several buildings.
- July 10, 1926: Picatinny Arsenal in New Jersey. 600,000 lbs. of explosives were detonated by a lightning strike. 187 of 200 buildings in the arsenal were destroyed and debris was found as far as 20 miles away. Damage of nearly US$1,000,000,000 in 2022 dollars.
- April 14, 1944: Bombay docks explosion. A British freighter SS Fort Stikine carrying 1,400 tons of explosives and 240 tons of weapons (torpedoes and mines) caught fire due to improper storage, resulting in two massive explosions killing some 800–1,300 people. The explosion also led to fires in many parts of the city and the docks needed months of repair work to function again.
- July 17, 1944: Port Chicago Disaster. A munitions explosion that killed 320 people occurred at the Port Chicago Naval Magazine in Port Chicago, California.
- Nov 27, 1944: RAF Fauld Explosion. Explosion of 3,500–4,000 tonnes of ordnance in an underground munitions store killed 70 people.
- October 1957: The Windscale fire, the worst nuclear accident in the UK's history, released substantial amounts of radioactive contamination into the surrounding area at Windscale, Cumberland (now Sellafield, Cumbria). The incident caused about 100–240 cancer deaths.
- August 9, 1965: Searcy missile silo fire, Arkansas. 53 contract workers were killed during a fire at a Titan missile silo. The cause of the fire was determined to be a welding rod damaging a hydraulic hose carrying Aerozine 50 fuel. This allowed the hypergolic fuel vapors to spread throughout the silo, which were then ignited by an open flame.
- April 13, 1976: Lapua Cartridge Factory explosion. An explosion in a munitions factory in Lapua, Finland, killed 40 workers.
- May 5, 1983: "6 Martie" Ammunition Factory in Zărnești, Romania. An explosion in the production facilities inside the factory completely destroyed two buildings, killing 37 people and injuring more than 300.
- April 10, 1988: Ojhri Camp, Rawalpindi, Pakistan. A military storage center exploded, killing more than 90 people.
- June 23, 1995: Grmeč factory explosion in Zemun, FR Yugoslavia. 11 workers were killed and 10 severely injured during illegal secret production of rocket fuel.
- July 11, 2011: Evangelos Florakis Naval Base explosion, Cyprus. The disaster occurred when 98 containers of gunpowder exploded; 13 people were killed including the base captain, 3 commanders, twin brothers serving there as marines, and 6 firefighters. 62 people were injured and the explosion knocked out the island's power station for days.
- October 10, 2025: 2025 Tennessee manufacturing plant explosion. 16 workers were killed when a building exploded at a facility belonging to Accurate Energetic Systems, which manufactures explosives for the US Department of Defense.

== Energy industry ==
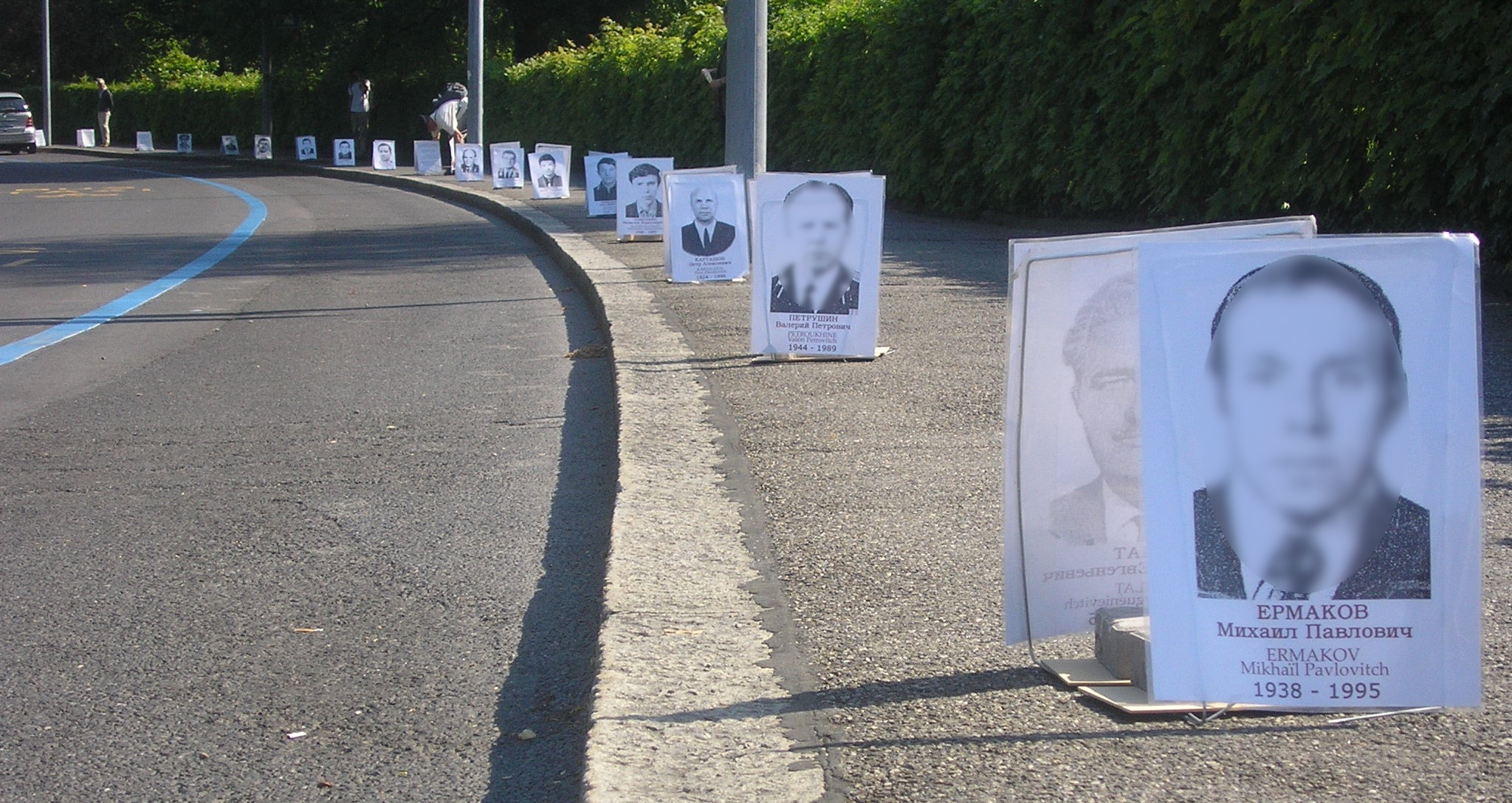
Deceased Liquidators' portraits used for an anti-nuclear power protest in Geneva.

- March 1928: The St. Francis Dam in the US state of California failed due to poor engineering and a lack of understanding the soil conditions. At least 431 people died in the subsequent flood, in what was one of the worst American civil engineering disasters of the 20th century and the third-greatest loss of life in California history.
- May 1962: The Centralia mine fire in the US state of Pennsylvania began when a surface fire accidentally ignited the mine's shallow coal vein, forcing the gradual evacuation of the Centralia borough. The fire burns today under the abandoned settlement.
- October 1963: The Vajont Dam overflow, caused by a massive landslide, destroyed several villages and towns and caused 1,917 deaths in northern Italy. The accident was anticipated by numerous warnings and signs of danger disregarded by the electrical company and government.
- March 4, 1965: The Natchitoches explosion: A 32-inch gas transmission pipeline north of Natchitoches, Louisiana, belonging to the Tennessee Gas Pipeline, exploded and burned from stress corrosion cracking, killing 17 people. At least 9 others were injured, and seven homes 450 feet (140 m) from the rupture were destroyed. The same pipeline had exploded on May 9, 1955, just 930 feet (280 m) from the 1965 failure.
- March 1967: The Torrey Canyon supertanker was shipwrecked off the west coast of Cornwall, England, causing an environmental disaster. This was the first major oil spill at sea.
- August 1975: The Banqiao Dam failed in the Henan Province of China due to extraordinarily heavy precipitation from the remnants of Typhoon Nina and poor construction quality of the dam, which was built during the Great Leap Forward. The flood immediately killed over 100,000 people, and another 150,000 died of subsequent epidemic diseases and famine, bringing the total death toll to around 250,000 and making it the worst technical disaster ever.
- March 16, 1978: The Amoco Cadiz, a VLCC owned by the company Amoco sank near the northwest coast of France, resulting in the spilling of 68,684,000 US gallons of crude oil (1,635,000 barrels). This is the largest oil spill from an oil tanker in history.
- January 8, 1979: The Whiddy Island disaster, also known as the Betelgeuse incident, occurred around 1:00 am, when the oil tanker Betelgeuse exploded in Bantry Bay, at the offshore jetty for the oil terminal at Whiddy Island, Ireland. The explosion and resulting fire claimed the lives of 50 people (42 French nationals, 7 Irish nationals, and 1 British national).
- March 28, 1979: Three Mile Island accident. Partial nuclear meltdown near Harrisburg, Pennsylvania. Mechanical failures in the non-nuclear secondary system, followed by a stuck-open pilot-operated relief valve in the primary system, allowed large amounts of reactor coolant to escape. Plant operators initially did not recognize the coolant loss, resulting in a partial meltdown. The reactor was brought under control only after up to 481 PBq (13 million curies) of radioactive gases released into the atmosphere.
- June 3, 1979: Ixtoc oil spill. The Ixtoc I exploratory oil well suffered a blowout resulting in the third-largest oil spill and the second-largest accidental spill in history.
- March 1980: The Alexander L. Kielland, a Norwegian semi-submersible drilling rig, capsized while working in the Ekofisk oil field, killing 123 people.
- November 20, 1980: A Texaco oil rig drilled into a salt mine transforming freshwater Lake Peigneur into a saltwater lake.
- February 15, 1982: Newfoundland, Canada. The mobile offshore oil rig Ocean Ranger was struck by a rogue wave off the coast of Newfoundland, Canada and sank with the loss of all 84 crew.
- December 19, 1982: The Tacoa disaster, an immense boilover from a fuel oil tank within the premises of a thermal power plant. It caused about 150 fatalities, including firefighters, media workers and bystanders.
- January 7, 1983: An explosion in Newark, New Jersey was felt as far away as 100–130 miles from the epicenter, but only claimed one life, and injured 22–24 people.
- July 23, 1984: Romeoville, Illinois, Union Oil refinery explosion killed 19 people.
- November 19, 1984: San Juanico Disaster. A series of boiling liquid expanding vapor explosions (BLEVEs) at a liquefied petroleum gas tank farm killed more than 500 and injured thousands in San Juan Ixhuatepec, Mexico.
- April 26, 1986: Chernobyl disaster. At the Chernobyl nuclear power plant in Pripyat, Soviet Union, (modern-day Ukraine) a test on reactor number four went out of control, resulting in a nuclear meltdown. The ensuing steam explosion and radiation killed up to 50 people with estimates of between 4,000 and several hundred thousand additional cancer deaths over time, although this has not yet been observed and was estimated based on the contested linear no-threshold model. Nuclear fallout was detected as far away as Canada. The Chernobyl Exclusion Zone, covering portions of Belarus and Ukraine surrounding Pripyat, remains contaminated and mostly uninhabited. Pripyat was evacuated and remains as a ghost town, although teeming with wildlife.
- May 5, 1988: Norco, Louisiana, Shell Oil refinery explosion. Hydrocarbon gas escaped from a corroded pipe in a catalytic cracker and was ignited. Louisiana State Police evacuated 2,800 residents from nearby neighborhoods. 7 workers were killed and 42 injured. The total cost arising from the Norco blast is estimated at US$706 million.
- July 6, 1988: Piper Alpha disaster. An explosion and resulting fire on a North Sea oil production platform killed 167 men. The total insured loss was about US$3.4 billion. To date it is the world's worst offshore oil disaster in lives lost and impact to industry.
- March 24, 1989: Exxon Valdez oil spill. The Exxon Valdez, an oil tanker bound for Long Beach, California, hit Prince William Sound's Bligh Reef, dumping an estimated minimum 10.8 million US gallons (40.9 million litres, or 250,000 barrels) of crude oil into the sea. It is considered one of the most devastating human-caused environmental disasters ever to occur. 100,000 to 250,000 seabirds died, at least 2,800 sea otters, approximately 12 river otters, 300 harbor seals, 247 bald eagles, and 22 orcas, and billions of salmon and herring eggs were destroyed. Population reduction was seen in various ocean animals, including stunted growth in pink salmon populations. Sea otters and ducks showed higher death rates in following years, partially because they ingested oil residues on their hair/feathers while grooming and consumed prey from contaminated soil.
- July 5, 1990: 1990 ARCO explosion. An explosion at a petrochemical plant in Channelview, Texas, killed 17 people and injured 5 others.
- April 22, 1992: 1992 Guadalajara explosions. A leak of gasoline into the sewer system caused 12 explosions in downtown Guadalajara, Mexico between 10:05 and 11:16 am, killing 206–252 people and injuring 1,800. Eight kilometers of streets were destroyed or seriously damaged.
- March 23, 2005: Texas City refinery explosion. An explosion occurred at a BP refinery in Texas City, Texas. It is the third largest refinery in the United States and one of the world's largest, processing 433,000 barrels of crude oil per day and accounting for three percent of the nation's gasoline supply. Over 100 were injured, and 15 were confirmed dead, including employees of Jacobs, Fluor and BP. BP has since accepted that its employees contributed to the accident. Several level indicators failed, leading to overfilling of a knockout drum, and light hydrocarbons concentrated at ground level throughout the area. A nearby running diesel truck set off the explosion.
- July 27, 2005: Mumbai High fire. A major fire struck ONGC's Mumbai High North offshore complex, located approximately 100 km off Mumbai, Maharashtra, India, when a support vessel collided with the production platform. The fire caused 22 fatalities and extensive material damage.
- December 11, 2005: Hertfordshire Oil Storage Terminal fire. A series of explosions at the Buncefield oil storage depot, described as the largest peacetime explosion in Europe, devastated the terminal and many surrounding properties. There were no fatalities. Total damages have been forecast as £750 million.
- December 19, 2007: T2 Laboratories explosion and fire. Runaway reactor for production of gasoline additives exploded in Jacksonville, Florida, killing four.
- December 22, 2008: Kingston Fossil Plant coal fly ash slurry spill. 1.1 billion gallons of coal ash were released when a dike ruptured at an ash storage pond at the Tennessee Valley Authority's Kingston Fossil Plant in Roane County, Tennessee.
- August 17, 2009: Sayano–Shushenskaya power station accident. 75 people were killed at a hydroelectric power station when a turbine failed. The failed turbine had been vibrating for a considerable time. Emergency doors to stop the incoming water took a long time to close, while a self-closing lock would have stopped the water in minutes.
- February 7, 2010: 2010 Connecticut power plant explosion. A large explosion occurred at a Kleen Energy Systems 620-megawatt, Siemens combined cycle gas- and oil- fired power plant in Middletown, Connecticut, US. Preliminary reports attributed the cause to a test of the plant's energy systems. The plant was still under construction and scheduled to start supplying energy in June 2010. The number of injuries was eventually established to be 27. Five people died in the explosion.
  Deepwater Horizon in flames after the explosion
- April 20, 2010: Deepwater Horizon oil spill in the Gulf of Mexico. 11 oil platform workers died in an explosion and fire that resulted in a massive oil spill in the Gulf of Mexico, considered the largest offshore spill in US history.
- March 11, 2011: As a result of the 2011 Tōhoku earthquake and tsunami,
  - Fukushima Daiichi nuclear accident in Japan. Regarded as the largest nuclear disaster since the Chernobyl disaster, there were no direct deaths but a few plant workers were severely injured or killed by the disaster conditions resulting from the earthquake.
  - Fujinuma Dam failure, Fukushima Prefecture, Japan. The dam failed 20–25 minutes after the earthquake as the nearly full reservoir overtopped the dam's crest. Eight people were killed.
  - Ichihara gas tank fire, Chiba Prefecture, Japan. A fire in natural gas containers at the Ichihara oil refinery. Six people were injured, and storage tanks were destroyed.
- February 24, 2012: Köprü Dam in Adana Province, Turkey. A hydroelectric dam whose diversion tunnel seal was breached. 97 million cubic meters of water flooded the area downstream of the dam. The accident and flood killed 10 workers.
- October 29, 2012: Hurricane Sandy caused a Consolidated Edison power plant to explode, causing a blackout in most of midtown Manhattan. The blue light emitted from the arc made places as far as Brooklyn glow. No person was killed or injured.
- July 6, 2013: Lac-Mégantic, Quebec, Canada. Lac-Mégantic derailment. 47 people were killed when there was a derailment of an oil shipment train. The oil shipment caught fire and exploded, destroying more than 30 buildings. It was the fourth-deadliest rail accident in Canadian history.
- June 29, 2017: Big Bend Power Station accident in Tampa, Florida. At Tampa Electric, at least five employees working for contractors tried to unplug a tank containing molten slag. Slag gushed from the tank, falling onto the workers below. The lava-like flow covered the floor six inches deep and 40 feet across, killing at least two workers and injuring several others.
- July 23, 2018: Laos dam collapse. Part of a hydroelectric dam system under construction collapsed in Champasak Province, Laos. The collapse lead to widespread destruction and homelessness. 40 people were confirmed dead, at least 98 more were missing, and 6,600 others were displaced.
- June 21, 2019: Philadelphia Refinery Explosion. An explosion at Philadelphia Energy Solutions' refinery destroyed the alkylation unit, where crude oil is converted to high octane gas, and led to the planned closure of the financially troubled plant. While the explosion and fire only led to a few minor injuries, it was catastrophic for the business.
- June 21^{st}, 2026: Tiruvallur ammonia gas leak. An ammonia gas leak at Tiruvallur district in Tamil Nadu, India killed 18 and injured 83. All the dead were women workers sleeping in a dormitory located above the processing facility.

== Food industry ==
- October 17, 1814: The London Beer Flood was an accident at Meux & Co's Horse Shoe Brewery, London, on October 17, 1814. It occurred when a 22-foot-tall (6.7 m) wooden vat of fermenting porter burst. The pressure of the escaping liquid dislodged the valve of another vessel and destroyed several large barrels: 128,000–323,000 imperial gallons (580,000–1,470,000 L; 154,000–388,000 US gal) of beer were released in total.
- June 18, 1875: The Dublin whiskey fire occurred on June 18, 1875 in the Liberties area of Dublin. It lasted one night but killed 13 people, and resulted in €6 million worth of damage in whiskey alone (adjusted for inflation). People drank the 6 inches (150 mm) deep river of whiskey that is said to have flowed as far as the Coombe. No fatality suffered during the fire was due to smoke inhalation, burns, or any other form of direct contact with the fire; all were attributed to alcohol poisoning.
- May 2, 1878: Great Mill Disaster. Six flour mills in Minneapolis were destroyed by a flour dust explosion and subsequent fire coming from the Washburn A Mill, killing 18. The mill was rebuilt with updated technology. The explosion led to new safety standards in the milling industry. A dust explosion is the rapid combustion of fine particles suspended in the air within an enclosed location. Dust explosions can occur where any dispersed powdered combustible material is present in high-enough concentrations in the atmosphere or other oxidizing gaseous medium, such as pure oxygen.
- August 9, 1919: The Port Colborne explosion at Port Colborne, Ontario was a dust explosion in the Dominion grain elevator on August 9, 1919. The blast killed 10 and seriously injured 16 more.

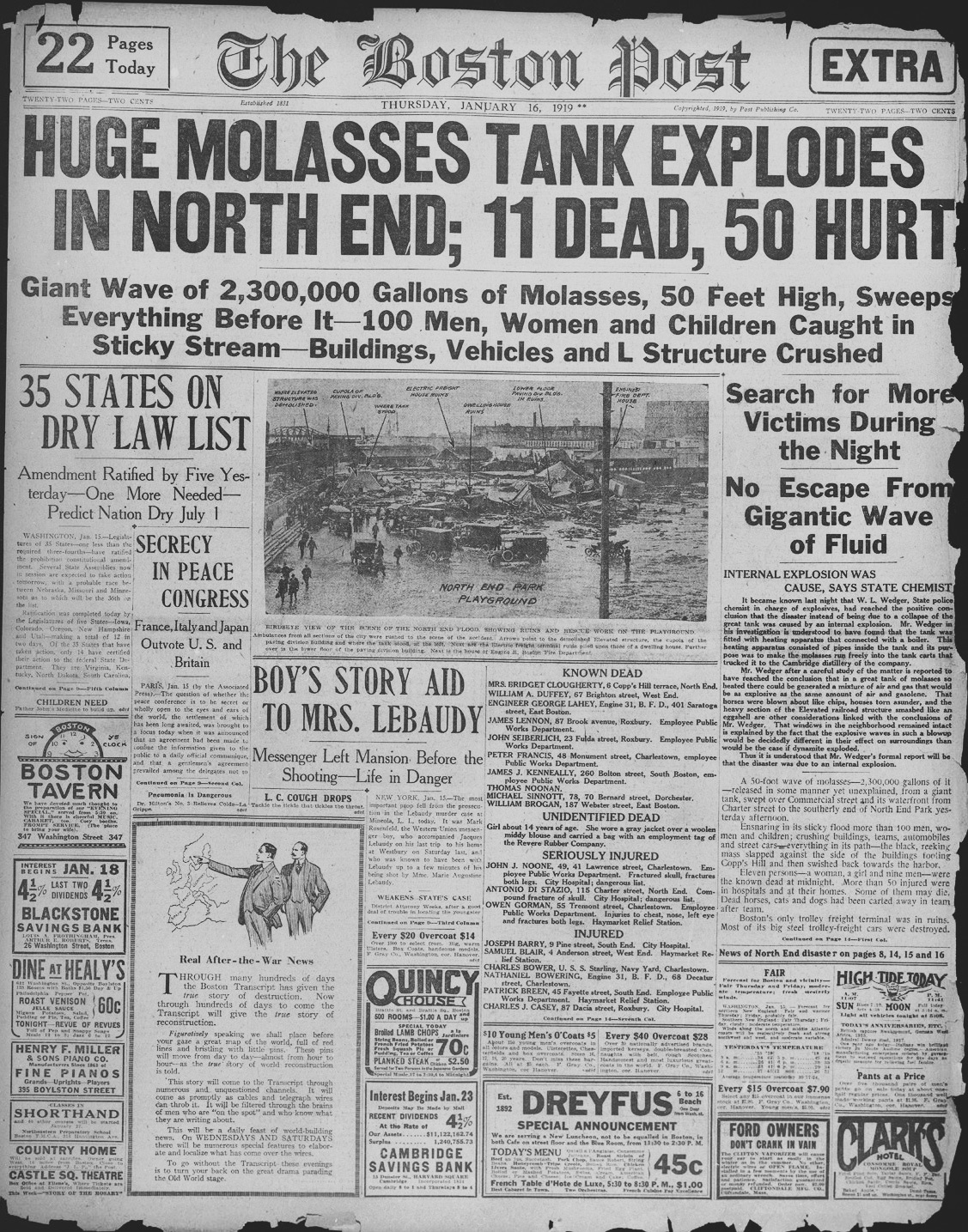
Coverage of the Great Molasses Flood from The Boston Post

- January 15, 1919: Great Molasses Flood. A large molasses tank in Boston, Massachusetts burst and a wave of molasses rushed through the streets at an estimated 35 mph (56 km/h), killing 21 and injuring 150. The event has entered local folklore, and residents claim that on a hot summer day, the area still smells of molasses.
- February 6, 1979: The Roland Mill, located in Bremen, West Germany, was destroyed by a flour dust explosion, killing 14 and injuring 17.
- September 3, 1991: Hamlet chicken processing plant fire in Hamlet, North Carolina, where locked doors trapped workers in a burning processing plant, causing 25 deaths.
- September 3, 1998: Grain elevator explosion in Haysville, Kansas. A series of dust explosions in a large grain storage facility resulted in the deaths of seven people.
- May 9, 2000: The Wild Turkey Distillery fire – On May 9, 2000, a fire destroyed an aging seven-story warehouse at the company in Anderson County, Kentucky. It contained more than 17,000 wooden barrels of whiskey. Burning whiskey flowed from the warehouse, setting the woods on fire. Firefighters saved Lawrenceburg's water treatment plant from destruction. However, an estimated 20% of the whiskey flowed into the Kentucky River. The river contamination required the temporary shutdown of the water treatment plant. Officials ordered water usage restrictions. Businesses and schools were closed because of the water shortage. The alcohol spill also depleted the oxygen in the river, killing an estimated 228,000 fish along a 66-mile stretch. The EPA and the Coast Guard's Gulf Strike Team aerated the river using equipment mounted on barges. The company paid $256,000 to the Kentucky Department of Fish and Wildlife in an effort to restore the fish population in the river.
- February 7, 2008: The 2008 Georgia sugar refinery explosion in Port Wentworth, Georgia, US. 14 people were killed and 42 injured when a dust explosion occurred at a sugar refinery owned by Imperial Sugar.
- March 12, 2008: Morin-Heights, Quebec, Canada. A roof collapse in the Gourmet du Village bakery warehouse killed three workers.
- June 9, 2009: The 2009 ConAgra Foods plant explosion, when a natural gas explosion at the ConAgra Foods Slim Jim production facility in Garner, North Carolina, US killed four people and triggered an ammonia leak.
- January 2013: 2013 Brunost blaze, 27 tonnes of goat cheese caught fire when the truck carrying it crashed in a tunnel in Tysfjord Municipality, Norway.
- September 2013: The Honolulu molasses spill – In September 2013, 1,400 tons of molasses spilled into Honolulu Harbor. The spill was discovered on September 9, 2013. It was caused by a faulty pipe, for which shipping company Matson Navigation Co. took responsibility. Molasses is an unregulated product, and neither Matson nor government officials had a contingency plan to respond to a molasses spill. Natural currents and weather were expected to eventually dilute and flush the molasses out of the harbor and a nearby lagoon.
- April 23, 2017: The Pepsi fruit juice flood was a flood of 176,000 barrels (28 million litres; 7.4 million US gallons) of fruit and vegetable juices into the streets of Lebedyan, Russia, and the Don River, caused by the collapse of a PepsiCo warehouse.
- January 28, 2021: The 2021 Georgia poultry plant accident in Gainesville, Georgia, US. Six people were killed by asphyxiation when a liquid nitrogen leak occurred at a poultry processing plant owned by Foundation Food Group.

== Manufacturing industry ==
- January 10, 1860: Pemberton Mill was a large factory in Lawrence, Massachusetts that collapsed without warning. An estimated 145 workers were killed and 166 injured.
- March 20, 1905: Grover Shoe Factory disaster. A boiler explosion, building collapse and fire killed 58 people and injured 150 in Brockton, Massachusetts.
- October 6, 1907: Standard Steel Car Company was a large pressed steel car company in Butler, Pennsylvania. A ladle containing 9,000 lbs. (4,800 kg) of molten steel exploded in the plant, killing 4 workers instantly, fatally wounding 20 others, and seriously injuring 10 more.
- March 25, 1911: Triangle Shirtwaist Factory fire in New York City. This was a major industrial disaster in the US, causing the death of over 100 garment workers who either died in the fire or jumped to their deaths. The fire led to legislation requiring improved factory safety standards and helped spur the growth of the International Ladies' Garment Workers' Union, which fought for better working conditions for sweatshop workers in that industry.
- February 20, 1947: O'Connor Plating Works disaster. A chemical explosion killed 17 people in Los Angeles.
- May 27, 1983: Benton fireworks disaster. An explosion at an illegal fireworks operation on a farm near Benton, Tennessee, killed 11, injured 1, and inflicted damage within a radius of several miles.
- November 23, 1984: MESIT factory collapse. A part of a factory in Uherské Hradiště, Czechoslovakia, collapsed, killing 18 workers and injuring 43. The accident was kept secret by the communist regime; however, the news broke the iron curtain and reached the Western media.
- December 3, 1984: The Bhopal disaster in India is one of the largest industrial disasters on record. A runaway reaction in a tank containing poisonous methyl isocyanate caused the pressure relief system to vent large amounts to the atmosphere at a Union Carbide India Limited plant. Estimates of the death toll range from 3,700 to 16,000. The disaster caused the region's human and animal populations severe, ongoing health problems.
- June 25, 1985: The Aerlex Fireworks plant explosion in Hallett, Oklahoma, killed 21 people after a chain-reaction occurred.
- May 4, 1988: PEPCON disaster, Henderson, Nevada. A massive fire and explosions at a chemical plant killed 2 people and injured over 300.
- May 10, 1993: Kader Toy Factory fire. A fire started in a poorly built factory in Thailand. Exit doors were locked and the stairwell collapsed. 188 workers were killed, mostly young women.
- May 13, 2000: Enschede fireworks disaster. A fire and explosion at a fireworks depot in Enschede, Netherlands, resulted in 24 deaths and another 947 were injured. About 1,500 homes were damaged or destroyed. The damage was estimated to be over US$300 million in insured losses.
- January 29, 2003: West Pharmaceutical Services explosion. The West Pharmaceutical Services syringe manufacturing facility was subject to a dust explosion which killed six people.
- November 3, 2004: Seest fireworks disaster. N. P. Johnsens Fyrværkerifabrik fireworks factory exploded in Seest, a suburb of Kolding, Denmark. 1 firefighter died; 7 from the rescue team as well as 17 locals were injured. In total 2,107 buildings were damaged by the explosion, with the cost of the damage estimated at €100 million.
- December 6, 2006: Falk Corporation Explosion. A gas leak triggered a large explosion and ensuing fire at a gear manufacturing facility in Milwaukee, Wisconsin. 3 were killed and 47 injured, with several of the buildings at the facility being leveled.
- April 18, 2007: Qinghe Special Steel Corporation disaster. A ladle holding molten steel separated from the overhead iron rail, fell, tipped, and killed 32 workers, injuring another 6.
- February 1, 2008: Istanbul fireworks explosion. An unlicensed fireworks factory exploded accidentally, leaving—by some reports—at least 22 people dead and at least 100 injured.
- September 11, 2012: Karachi, Pakistan, 289 people died in a fire at the Ali Enterprises garment factory, which made ready-to-wear clothing for Western export.
- November 24, 2012: Dhaka Tasreen Fashions fire. A seven-story factory fire outside of Dhaka, the capital of Bangladesh, killed at least 112 people, 12 from jumping out of windows to escape the blaze.
- April 24, 2013: Rana Plaza collapse. An eight-story factory building collapsed on the outskirts of Dhaka, the capital of Bangladesh, and killed 1,129 people. The building contained five garment factories manufacturing clothing for the Western market.
- October 26, 2017: Tangerang fireworks disaster. At around 8:30pm local time, a fireworks factory at Kosambi, Tangerang, exploded, shattering windows four kilometres away and igniting a massive fire inside the factory. A second explosion occurred three hours later. There were 103 workers inside the factory at the time of the explosion; 49 were killed and 46 were injured.
- August 2025: Enaex Brasil explosives factory, Paraná, Brazil. Nine workers killed, seven injured.

== Mining industry ==
- December 12, 1866: Oaks Colliery Explosion in Barnsley, West Riding of Yorkshire, UK. Caused by the explosion of firedamp. It was the worst mining accident in England, with a death toll of 361.
- September 6, 1869: Avondale Mine Disaster, Plymouth Township, Pennsylvania. A massive fire at the Avondale Colliery caused the death of 110 workers. It was the greatest mine disaster to that point in American history.
- February 16, 1883: Diamond Mine Disaster in Diamond, Illinois, US. 74 people died, including 6 children.
- June 28, 1896: Twin Shaft disaster, Pittston, Pennsylvania. A massive cave-in killed 58 coal miners at the Newton Colliery.
- March 10, 1906: Courrières mine disaster, Courrières, France. 1,099 people died, including children, in the worst mine accident in Europe.
- December 6, 1907: Monongah mining disaster, Monongah, West Virginia. 362 people officially died. The worst industrial accident in US history.
- October 14, 1913: Senghenydd Colliery Disaster, Senghenydd, Wales. The worst mining accident in the UK. 439 workers died.
- June 19, 1914: Hillcrest mine disaster, Hillcrest, Alberta, Canada. 189 workers died due to an explosion within the mine or from exposure to toxic fumes as a result of the same.
- December 15, 1914: The Mitsubishi Hōjō mine disaster, Kyushu, Japan. A gas explosion at the Hōjō (Hojyo) coal mine killed 687. It was the worst mining accident in Japan.
- September 10, 1918: Protection Island mining disaster. Hoisting cable frayed causing an elevator car carrying miners to plunge 100 m causing the death of 16 miners on Protection Island near Nanaimo British Columbia, Canada
- June 7, 1920: Anina mine disaster. Caused by the explosion of three tons of decaying dynamite stored in two rooms within the mine. More than 200 miners were killed.
- April 27, 1922: Lupeni mine disaster. A methane explosion occurred at the Aurelia Mine in Lupeni, Romania, killing 82 miners, and leaving 62 widows and 124 orphans.
- September 22, 1934: Gresford Disaster. An explosion and underground fire killed 261 men at Gresford Colliery, near Wrexham, UK.
- 1940s - 1966: Wittenoom Mine Disaster. Asbestos mining in the Pilbara, Western Australia, exposed workers and residents to deadly fibers, leading to widespread illness and contamination. More than 2,000 deaths were due to asbestos poisoning. The worst industrial accident in Australian history.
- April 26, 1942: Benxihu Colliery disaster, Benxi, Liaoning Province, in the Imperial Japanese puppet state of Manchukuo. 1,549 workers died, making this the worst coal mine accident ever in the world.
- August 8, 1956: Marcinelle mining disaster. An underground fire killed 262 workers, most of whom were Italian immigrants, in the Belgian town of Marcinelle.
- October 23, 1958: Springhill mining disaster, Springhill, Nova Scotia, Canada. A "bump," or underground earthquake caused by a collapse, killed 75 miners. The other 99 miners were rescued by a recovery effort. Previous disasters had occurred at the same mine in 1891 and 1956.
- January 22, 1959: Knox Mine Disaster, Jenkins Township, Pennsylvania. Illegally undermining the Susquehanna River resulted in a coal mine flood that killed 12.
- January 21, 1960: Coalbrook mining disaster at the Clydesdale Colliery near Sasolburg, Orange Free State, South Africa. 435 miners died. It was the worst mining accident in South Africa.
- May 9, 1960: Laobaidong mining disaster. A methane gas explosion in the Laobaidong coal mine at Datong in the Shanxi province of China killed 684.
- November 9, 1963: Mitsui Miike Coal Mine disaster. An explosion caused by the ignition of coal dust at the Miike coal mine in Kyushu, Japan. 458 people were killed by the explosion or by carbon monoxide poisoning. 839 others were injured.
- May 28, 1965: Dhanbad coal mine disaster, Jharkhand, India. Over 300 miners killed.
- May 1, 1966: Vratsa dam failure, Zgorigrad, People's Republic of Bulgaria. A copper tailings dam failed and flooded the city of Vratsa and the nearby village of Zgorigrad. 107–480 people were killed.
- October 21, 1966: Aberfan disaster, Aberfan, Wales. A catastrophic collapse of a colliery spoil-tip killed 116 children and 28 adults.
- October 30, 1971: Certej dam disaster, Certeju de Sus, Socialist Republic of Romania. A tailings dam failed due to overfilling. The flood destroyed six apartment buildings, a dormitory building and seven individual houses. 89 people were killed.
- June 6, 1972: Wankie coal mine disaster, Rhodesia (present-day Zimbabwe). 426 people were killed, making it the country's worst-ever mining disaster.
- November 29, 1980: Livezeni coal mine disaster, Petroșani, Socialist Republic of Romania. An explosion in the Livezeni Coal Mine killed 53 (including 15 military) and injured 27. It was the fourth-worst mining disaster in Romania.
- July 19, 1985: Val di Stava dam collapse, Stava, near Tesero, Italy. Two tailings dams, used for sedimenting the mud from the nearby Prestavel mine, failed. This resulted in one of Italy's worst disasters, killing 268 people, destroying 63 buildings and demolishing eight bridges.
- May 9, 1992: Westray mine disaster, Plymouth, Nova Scotia, Canada. A methane explosion killed all 26 miners. Canada's deadliest mining disaster since 1958.
- May 9, 1993: Nambija mine disaster, Nambija, Ecuador. Approximately 300 people were killed in a landslide.
- January 30, 2000: Baia Mare cyanide spill, Baia Mare, Romania. The accident, called the worst environmental disaster in Europe since Chernobyl, was a release of 100,000 tons of cyanide-contaminated water into the rivers Someş, Tisza and Danube by the Aurul mining company due to a reservoir breach. Although no human fatalities were reported, the leak killed up to 80 percent of aquatic life in some of the affected rivers.
- April 5, 2010: Upper Big Branch Mine disaster, West Virginia, US. An explosion occurred in Massey Energy's Upper Big Branch coal mine. 29 out of 31 miners at the site were killed.
- November 19, 2010: Pike River Mine disaster, New Zealand. At 3:45pm, the coal mine exploded. 29 men underground died immediately, or shortly afterwards, from the blast or from the toxic atmosphere. Two men in the stone drift, some distance from the mine workings, managed to escape. (Extract from Royal Commission of Inquiry Report on Pike River.)
- May 13, 2014: Soma mine disaster, Manisa Province, Turkey. An explosion occurred two kilometers below the surface, starting a fire, which caused the mine's elevator to stop working. This trapped several hundred miners, many of whom died of carbon monoxide poisoning. 787 workers were present during the disaster, and 301 of them died during the disaster.
- November 5, 2015: Mariana dam disaster, Minas Gerais, Brazil. An iron ore tailings dam suffered a catastrophic failure. The resultant flooding destroyed the village of Bento Rodrigues and killed 19 people.
- January 25, 2019: Brumadinho dam disaster, Minas Gerais, Brazil. An iron ore tailings dam suffered a catastrophic failure. At least 259 people died.
- June 27, 2019: Kolwezi copper and cobalt mine collapse, Lualaba province, Democratic Republic of the Congo. The mine was being worked by illegal artisanal miners, 43 of whom were killed.
- September 11, 2020: Kamituga gold mine landslides, South Kivu province, Democratic Republic of the Congo. More than 50 people died when three artisanal gold mining wells collapsed in landslides.
- November 2021: The Listvyazhnaya mine disaster took place in Listvyazhnaya, Russia. 40 men died in the accident.
- January 29, 2026: 2026 Rubaya mine collapse at the Rubaya mines in the Democratic Republic of the Congo. At least 400 killed.

== Other industrial disasters ==
- March 11, 1864: The Great Sheffield Flood. The Dale Dyke Dam, at Bradfield, South Yorkshire, collapsed when its reservoir was being filled for the first time. At least 240 people died, and 5,000 properties were flooded. Historian Peter Machan said: "In terms of Victorian England it was the greatest disaster in terms of loss of life, apart from maritime disasters."
- January 20, 1909: Chicago Crib Disaster. During construction of a water intake tunnel for the city of Chicago, a fire broke out on a temporary water crib used to access an intermediate point along the tunnel. The fire began in the dynamite magazine and burned the wooden dormitory that housed the tunnel workers. 46 workers survived the fire by jumping into the lake and climbing onto ice floes or the spoil heap near the crib. 29 men were burned beyond recognition, and approximately 60 men died. Most of the remainder drowned or froze to death in the lake and were not recovered.
- September 21, 1921: Oppau explosion, Germany. Occurred when a tower silo storing 4,500 tonnes of a mixture of ammonium sulfate and ammonium nitrate fertilizer exploded at a BASF plant in Oppau, now part of Ludwigshafen, Germany, killing 500–600 people and injuring about 2,000 more.
- 1927–1932: Hawks Nest Tunnel disaster, near Gauley Bridge, West Virginia, US. Over several years, as many as 1,000 out of 3,000 workers died from silicosis.
- 1932–1968: The Minamata disaster was caused by the dumping of mercury compounds in Minamata Bay, Japan. The Chisso Corporation, a fertilizer and later petrochemical company, was found responsible for polluting the bay for 37 years. It is estimated that over 3,000 people suffered various deformities, severe mercury poisoning symptoms or death from what became known as Minamata disease.
- April 16, 1947: Texas City disaster, Texas. At 9:15am an explosion occurred aboard the docked ship Grandcamp. The explosion, and subsequent fires and explosions, is referred to as the worst industrial disaster in America. At least 578 people died and 3,500 were injured as the blast shattered windows as far away as 25 miles (40 km). Large steel pieces were thrown over a mile from the dock. The origin of the explosion was fire in the ship's cargo. Detonation of 3,200 tons of ammonium nitrate fertilizer aboard the Grandcamp led to further explosions and fires. The fertilizer shipment was to aid struggling European farmers recovering from World War II.
- July 28, 1948: A chemical tank wagon explosion within the BASF's Ludwigshafen, Germany site caused 207 fatalities. 3,818 were injured, and 3,122 buildings were significantly affected.
- January 9, 1959: Vega de Tera disaster, Spain. Amidst heavy rain, the small Vega de Tera dam failed at about 1:00 am, killing 144 of 532 inhabitants in downriver Ribadelago (Zamora, Spain) minutes later. The dam was new (1956) but poorly built as usual in that period, when the Francoist regime was prioritizing economic development over construction quality. The town was partially destroyed and never recovered; after, survivors were moved out of the floodable area to a newly built nearby town (Ribadelago Nuevo, "New Ribadelago").
- February 3, 1971: The Thiokol-Woodbine Explosion at a Thiokol chemical plant in Georgia (US) killed 29 people and seriously injured 50.
- June 1, 1974: Flixborough disaster, England. An explosion at a chemical plant near the village of Flixborough killed 28 people and seriously injured another 36.
- 1972–1976: Dioxin is unknowingly released on the unpaved roads of Times Beach, Missouri, as part of a dust-abatement program, causing the evacuation and disincorporation of the 2,000-strong town starting 1983. It was the largest civilian exposure to dioxin in US history.
- July 10, 1976: Seveso disaster, in Seveso, Italy, in a small chemical manufacturing plant of ICMESA. Due to the release of dioxins into the atmosphere and through a large section of the Lombard Plain, 3,000 pets and farm animals died and, later, 70,000 animals were slaughtered to prevent dioxins from entering the food chain. In addition, 193 people in the affected area suffered from chloracne and other symptoms. The disaster lead to the Seveso Directive, which was issued by the European Community and imposed much harsher industrial regulations.
- April 27, 1978: Willow Island disaster. A cooling tower for a power plant under construction in Willow Island, West Virginia, collapsed, killing 51 construction workers. The cause was attributed to placing loads on recently poured concrete before it had cured sufficiently to withstand the loads. It is thought to be the largest construction accident in US history.
- October 12, 1978: Spyros disaster. The Greek tanker Spyros exploded at Jurong Shipyard in Singapore on October 12, 1978. It killed 76 people, and remains the worst accident, in terms of deaths, in Singapore's post-war history. It is also Singapore's worst industrial accident.
- February 24, 1984: Occurred in the night in Cubatao, Brazil, around 11:30pm a gasoline pipeline exploded in the favela of Vila Sao Jose killing at least 508 people, most of them children. The tragedy turned the eyes of the world to Cubatao and laid bare another problem: industrial pollution, since the 70s, gave the city the nickname "Death Valley."
- November 1, 1986: The Sandoz disaster in Schweizerhalle, Switzerland, released tons of toxic agrochemicals into the Rhine River.
- June 28, 1988: Auburn, Indiana. Improper mixing of chemicals at Bastian Plating Company killed four workers in the worst confined-space industrial accident in US history; a fifth victim died two days later.
- October 23, 1989: Phillips Disaster. An explosion and fire killed 23 and injured 314 in Pasadena, Texas, and registered 3.5 on the Richter magnitude scale.
- July 5, 1990: An explosion and fire occurred at the Arco Chemical Company complex in Channelview, Texas. 17 people were killed. 5 were permanent employees and the remaining 12 were contract labor employees. An area approximately the size of a city block was completely destroyed; no one in the area survived the explosion.
- May 1, 1991: Sterlington, Louisiana. An explosion at the IMC-operated Angus Chemical nitro-paraffin plant in Sterlington, Louisiana, killed 8 workers and injured 120 other people. There was severe damage to the surrounding community. The blasts were heard more than eight miles away.
- May 7, 1991: Sungai Buloh fireworks disaster. Around 3:45pm MYT, the Bright Sparklers Fireworks factory near Sungai Buloh, Selangor, Malaysia, caught fire and violently exploded, caused by experimentations with explosive chemicals in the factory's canteen. The disaster claimed 26 lives and injured over 100. Dubbed the Hiroshima of Sungai Buloh, the energy which emanated from the explosion was strong enough to destroy over 200 residential properties in the vicinity of the factory.
- August 21, 2000: Pingxiang steel plant explosion. An oxygen generator exploded in a steel plant in Pingxiang, Jiangxi, China. At least 19 steel workers were killed.
- September 21, 2001: Toulouse, France. An explosion at the AZF fertilizer factory killed 29, injured 2,500, and caused extensive structural damage to nearby neighbourhoods.
- October 19, 2009: Ottawa, Canada. A boiler explosion at the Cliff Central Heating and Cooling Plant killed one person, and three others suffered injuries.
- October 4, 2010: Alumina plant accident. Ajka, Kolontár, Devecser, and several other settlements, Hungary. The dam of Magyar Aluminium's red mud reservoir broke and the escaping highly toxic and alkaline (~pH 13) sludge flooded several settlements. There were nine victims, including a young girl, and hundreds of injuries (mostly chemical burns).
- January 20, 2012: Burns Lake, British Columbia, Canada. At a wood mill, 2 workers were killed and 20 others injured in a fire and explosion. A combustible dust environment led to the explosion and fire.
- November 8, 2012: Sherbrooke, Quebec, Canada. 2 people died and 19 were injured in an industrial processing plant belonging to Neptune Technologies & Bioressources, a manufacturer of health care products.
- April 17, 2013: Fertilizer plant explosion in West, Texas. An explosion occurred at the West Fertilizer Company storage and distribution facility in West, Texas, 18 miles (29 km) north of Waco, while emergency services personnel were responding to a fire at the facility. 15 people were killed, more than 160 were injured, and more than 150 buildings damaged or destroyed.
- June 20, 2013: Coteau-du-Lac, Quebec, Canada. Two women were killed in a fireworks warehouse explosion.
- July 31–August 1, 2014: 2014 Kaohsiung gas explosions. From the underground-installed gas pipelines of a petrochemical factory, a large-scale leakage (which had been occurring for more than three hours) led to a series of gas explosions in the streets of Kaohsiung, Taiwan at midnight between the two days. 32 people were killed and 321 others were injured.
- August 12, 2015: Binhai, Tianjin, China. Two explosions within 30 seconds of each other occurred at a container storage station at the Port of Tianjin in the Binhai New Area of Tianjin, China. 173 people died as a result.
- August 23, 2016: Chittagong, Bangladesh. An incident of gas leakage happened at a fertilizer company in the port city of Chittagong. The fertilizer company belongs to Chittagong Urea Fertiliser Limited (CUFL) located near the shore of Karnaphuli River. No deaths were reported but 25 people had fallen ill due to toxic ammonia inhalation. The investigation team found that tank was maintained by unskilled workers instead of skilled engineers which resulted in leakage.
- September 10, 2016: Gazipur, Bangladesh. A boiler explosion in a packaging industry in the town of Tongi, Gazipur, led to the death of 23 workers. The explosion was so powerful that it made part of the four-story building collapse. The explosion also triggered a fire which spread to surrounding areas.
- May 9, 2018: Patel Milmet Dam failure. An embankment dam in Nakuru County, Kenya, burst during heavy rains, killing at least 48 people.
- May 7, 2020: Visakhapatnam gas leak. A gas leakage accident at LG Polymers chemical plant in Gopala samudram, Vizag. The leakage had spread over a radius of about 3 km, affecting the nearby areas and villages. 11 were killed and more than 1,000 people were injured as of May 7, 2020.
- June 3, 2020: 2020 Dahej chemical plant explosion. 5 deaths and more than 50 people injured.
- August 4, 2020: 2020 Beirut explosions. A massive explosion of a large cache of ammonium nitrate at the Port of Beirut flattened much of the port and damaged buildings throughout the city. More than 200 people were killed and over 7,000 injured.
- November 4, 2020: Ahmedabad chemical factory blast resulted in 12 deaths and injuries to 9 people.
- January 6, 2022: Surat gas leak: At least 6 people died and 22 people became sick following gas leak from a tanker in an industrial area in India.
- June 4, 2022: 2022 Sitakunda fire. A fire and subsequent explosions at a container storage facility in Bangladesh's Chittagong District killed at least 33 people and injured more than 450 others.
- June 27, 2022: 2022 Aqaba toxic gas leak, at least 10 dead and more than 251 injured by ruptured tank containing 25 tons of chlorine in Port of Aqaba, Jordan.
- April 26, 2025: 2025 Port of Shahid Rajaee explosion.
- April 29, 2025: 2025 Isfahan explosion.

== See also ==
- Lists of disasters
- List of environmental disasters
- List of civilian nuclear accidents
- List of accidents and disasters by death toll
- List of disasters in Great Britain and Ireland
- Environmental racism
