= 2020 Ahmedabad chemical factory blast =

Industrial disaster in Ahmedabad, India

- Date: 4 November 2020
- Time: 11:22 a.m. IST
- Venue: Sahil Enterprises chemical boiler factory
- Location: Revabhai Nanu Kaka estate, Pirana, Gujarat, India; 22°59′30″N 72°34′13″E
- Deaths: 12
- Injuries: 9

On 4 November 2020, a blast at a chemical factory in Ahmedabad, Gujarat, India caused deaths of 12 people and injuries to nine others.

== Incident ==
A blast occurred at Sahil Enterprise, a chemical factory on Piplaj road in Pirana, Ahmedabad at 11:22 am IST. Kanika Texo Fab, a textile facility next to the factory, had around 30 people working when the blast occurred. The building collapsed and several people died and others injured due to the fallen debris. A total 12 people, including five women, died. Nine others, including four women, were admitted to the L G Hospital, six of whom were in critical condition.

== Rescue and compensation ==
The fire brigade arrived with 60 firefighters and 24 fire engines. The rescue operation lasted till 8:00 pm IST.

The Government of Gujarat had announced an ex gratia of ₹4 lakh (US$4,200) each to the families of those killed.

== Investigation ==
The Chief Minister of Gujarat Vijay Rupani had ordered the investigation. An inquiry commission comprising two members was formed for investigation. The FIR was filed by Gujarat Police against the owner of the chemical factory and two owners of the estate on 5 November 2020.

== See also ==
- 2020 Dahej chemical plant explosion
- Visakhapatnam gas leak
- List of industrial disasters
