= 2021 Georgia poultry plant accident =

Fatal liquid nitrogen leak

Coordinates: 34.26719°N 83.85867°W

- Date: January 28, 2021
- Time: 10:00 a.m. (EST)
- Location: Gainesville, Georgia, U.S.
- Deaths: 6
- Injuries: 10

The 2021 Georgia poultry plant accident was an industrial disaster that occurred on January 28, 2021, in Gainesville, Georgia, United States. Six people were killed by asphyxiation and at least ten were injured when a liquid nitrogen leak occurred inside a poultry processing plant owned by Foundation Food Group.

== Background ==
Gainesville has many poultry processing plants employing thousands of people, earning the city the nickname "poultry capital of the world". The plant where the accident occurred was owned by Prime Pak Foods until January 2021, when it merged into Foundation Food Group. The facility processes raw chicken for foodservice and commercial sale.

Refrigeration systems used in the factory relied on liquid nitrogen as a refrigerant. When released into open air, liquid nitrogen vaporizes into its gaseous state, and is nontoxic. However, the infiltration of large quantities of gaseous nitrogen displaces oxygen in the air, and can lead to death by asphyxiation after a period of time in the oxygen-deprived environment.

== Leakage and emergency response ==
2026 U.S. Chemical Safety Board video animation of the accident

The liquid nitrogen leak began around 8:45 a.m. EST. It was initially reported to have been an explosion, which was later found to be false. The release began while maintenance workers were troubleshooting operational issues with the freezer, which was designed and owned by Messer and leased to Foundation Food Group. Once released, the liquid nitrogen quickly vaporized, expanded, and accumulated inside a partially enclosed lower-level room that lacked mechanical ventilation. The two maintenance workers who were troubleshooting the freezer at the time of the release were fatally injured by asphyxiation due to the vaporized liquid nitrogen.

The uncontrolled liquid nitrogen release continued, and the two deceased workers went undetected for 30 to 60 minutes, until another worker went looking for them and saw a four- to five-foot-high vapor cloud filling the room. This worker reported the incident to management, which then initiated an evacuation. Local and county firefighters were notified by 10:12 a.m. of burn victims at the plant. They arrived at 10:18 a.m. to find evacuated workers, some injured, outside the building. The emergency shut off button was activated at 10:36 a.m., stopping the leak.

During the ensuing building-wide evacuation, at least 14 other FFG employees, including members of management, responded to the incident by either investigating the freezer room or attempting to rescue their coworkers. As a result, four additional FFG employees were fatally injured by asphyxiation, one of whom died at the hospital. Three other FFG employees were seriously injured, while seven received minor injuries. In addition, four firefighters reported respiratory issues and were taken to Northeast Georgia Medical Center. One of the firefighters was seriously injured. About 130 factory workers were bussed to a Free Chapel church campus in Gainesville and examined for injuries. About 1.5 miles of Memorial Park Drive/Road, where the factory and a nearby elementary school is located, were closed until 1:30 p.m.

== Investigation ==
Page 8 of the December 2023 USCSB report summarizing the incident.

Hall County Fire Department Division Chief Zach Brackett stated that firefighters, the U.S. Occupational Safety and Health Administration (OSHA), and the Georgia state fire marshal were investigating the cause of the leak. The U.S. Chemical Safety Board (USCSB) was also investigating.

OSHA's investigation determined that the leak occurred as a result of a freezer malfunction, which released liquid nitrogen that rapidly vaporized and displaced the oxygen in the confined space of the freezer room. The agency found that Foundation Food Group had failed to adequately train its employees on the hazards associated with liquid nitrogen in confined spaces, failed to implement a permit-required confined space program, and failed to implement an appropriate lockout–tagout procedure for the freezers, among other violations. Officials, including U.S. Labor Secretary Marty Walsh, called the six deaths "entirely avoidable."

The USCSB completed their investigation on December 11, 2023, and released their animation review on August 25, 2026. In their final report, they determined that the leak was caused by a single point of failure with the liquid nitrogen level monitor. Due to an inaccurate reading, the freezer continued to release liquid nitrogen past the overflow level. They also found that there was no atmospheric monitoring and alarm system, no training or equipment given to workers for a liquid nitrogen release event, and no documented process safety management policy. Messer leased the liquid nitrogen tanks and freezer to Foundation Food Group; the USCSB found that they continued to supply liquid nitrogen despite knowledge of safety issues at Foundation Food Group.

== See also ==
- Occupational Safety and Health Administration
- U.S. Chemical Safety and Hazard Investigation Board
- Inert gas asphyxiation
