= Qinghe Special Steel Corporation disaster =

2007 industrial disaster in China

- A view of the aftermath of the disaster
- Date: April 18, 2007
- Time: 7:45 am local time
- Location: Qinghe District, Tieling, Liaoning, China; 42°31′27″N 124°07′21″E
- Deaths: 32
- Injuries: 6

The Qinghe Special Steel Corporation disaster was an industrial disaster that occurred on April 18, 2007, in Qinghe District, Tieling, Liaoning, China. Thirty-two people were killed and six were injured when a ladle used to transport molten steel separated from an overhead rail in the Qinghe Special Steel Corporation factory.

An investigation by Chinese authorities found that the plant lacked many major safety features and was severely below regulation benchmarks, with the direct cause of the accident being attributed to inappropriate use of substandard equipment. The investigation also concluded that the various other safety failings at the facility were contributing factors. The report criticised safety standards throughout the Chinese steel industry.

Sun Huashan, then-deputy head of the State Administration of Work Safety, said that it was "the most serious accident to hit China's steel industry since 1949."

== Background ==
The Qinghe Special Steel Corporation, established in 1987, had originally been a state-owned enterprise and had been restructured into a private business. According to the State Administration of Work Safety, the plant had about 300 employees at the time of the accident, although the Xinhua News Agency gave the employment figure as 650. In 2006, the factory produced 70,000 tonnes (69,000 long tons; 77,000 short tons) of steel and had hoped to increase production to 120,000 tonnes (120,000 long tons; 130,000 short tons) in 2007.

The building where the disaster occurred was used by the Qinghe Special Steel Corporation as a steel processing plant. The ladle which failed carried molten steel from a blast furnace to other processes, and had a diameter of two metres and a capacity of 30 tonnes (30 long tons; 33 short tons) of liquid steel. It ran on a rail at a height of 3 metres (9.8 ft) above the factory floor.

== Event ==
At 7:45 am local time, the ladle in question separated from the overhead iron rail connecting it to the blast furnace while it was being positioned over a worktable in preparation to pour out its contents. All 30 tonnes (33 tons) of liquid steel, at a temperature of approximately 1,500 degrees Celsius (2,730 F), were spilled. This liquid steel then burst through the windows and door of an adjoining room 5 metres away where workers had gathered during a change of shifts, engulfing that room entirely.

When emergency services arrived, they were initially unable to provide assistance as the high temperature of the molten steel prevented them from entering the area. When they were able to access the area, they discovered 32 workers had been killed by the spill. Six others in the room survived and were rushed to the hospital with severe burns. According to doctors, five workers were initially listed as being in a stable condition, whereas the other was listed as critical. They were said to be at risk of contracting infections through their burns. However, an earlier statement on the website of the State Administration of Work Safety published conflicting information, saying that the 32 deceased represented everyone in the room at the time, and that only two people were injured – the operators of the ladle. The official Xinhua press agency also released a report stating that the ladle fell on workers below, but this was unclear as in to whether the workers were in fact crushed or whether this, too, conflicted with the other reports.

After retrieving the six survivors, rescuers then recovered the bodies of the 32 deceased.

== Reactions and survivor accounts ==
Sun Huashan, deputy head of the State Administration of Work Safety, held a press conference shortly after the disaster in which he stated, "It is the most serious accident to hit China's steel industry since 1949". There was a public outcry across China as news of the spill became known.

The survivors were interviewed for the media and by investigators about their experience. One gave the following account of the tragedy: "I was bending down to get some tools when I heard screaming. The ladle was falling... [The liquid] fell on to the ground and then spilled onto my body and burnt [my] clothes. I just ran." Another gave this description of being burned by the steel: "When the steel hit, it felt like being beaten by iron bars – my brain went blank. I would be dead if I had turned my head".

One survivor, Jiao Zhengyan, 38 and head of the company's ingot casting section, explained why the steel had been spilled instead of remaining in an upright ladle: "As the ladle was falling, it hit a flatbed and tilted. The molten steel immediately flowed into the nearby conference room."

== Investigation ==
The Chinese authorities immediately launched an investigation into the disaster which concluded a week later on April 23. The factory itself was sealed off for the course of the investigation, a common practice in China, but work continued in the site office.

The investigation concluded that the direct cause of the disaster was Qinghe using a standard hoist instead of one specifically designed for dangerous smelting work. Other contributing factors identified were lax safety measures and "chaotic" management. The official report also stated that "Equipment and materials inside the workshop were messy, the work space was narrow, and safety passages did not meet requirements."

The report further indicated that the accident highlighted poor working conditions and safety measures in the Chinese steel industry, stating, "Some firms cannot adapt to the demands of rapid expansion and ignore safety... Safety inspection is not in place, leading to multiple accidents... Work safety conditions in the metallurgy sector are extremely grim."

== Aftermath ==
The bodies of the deceased were too badly burned to be recognisable, so DNA testing was used for identification. Within 24 hours of the disaster, officials had arrested the plant's owner and three employees who were in charge of work safety issues, and had promised the families of the victims a minimum of 200,000 yuan (US$26,000) each in compensation. According to Xinhua, the positions of those arrested were the manager of the mill, an operator, a technician and a workshop supervisor. The same statement from the work safety administration that had issued the conflicting injury count stated that those responsible were "under control" but did not elaborate further.
