= Grmeč factory explosion =

1995 industrial disaster

- Date: June 23, 1995
- Time: 6:30 p.m. (CEST)
- Venue: "Grmeč" factory
- Type: Industrial disaster
- Cause: Rocket fuel explosion
- Deaths: 11
- Injuries: 10
- Accused: 5
- Convicted: 0
- Trial: 2000-2014
- Verdict: 2014
- Convictions: All acquitted

On the evening of 23 June 1995, a strong explosion killed 11 and severely wounded 10 workers in the "Grmeč" factory in Zemun, Serbia (then part of the Federal Republic of Yugoslavia). On the orders of the deputy head of the State Security Directorate (SDB) Radosav Lukić, the workers were secretly producing rocket fuel in an industrial plant nor registered, nor properly equipped for such dangerous operation. The plant where the explosion happened was intended for producing floor coverings and was not equipped for handling flammable and explosive materials. The operation was approved by president of Serbia Slobodan Milošević and head of the SDB Jovica Stanišić.

Both the pre-2000 Milošević era Government and the post-2000 democratic government of Serbia obstructed the investigation and tried to cover up the case. Government-affiliated media claimed the cause of the explosion was either "sabotage" or "diversion". No one was ever found guilty for any criminal offence although the operation was illegal and in breach of several safety standards.

== The disaster ==
=== Background ===
On 13 May 1995, Radosav Lukić, deputy head of the State Security Directorate (SDB) met Rajko Umčanin, CEO of Grmeč and Radoslav Čobanin, a high-ranking official of the Yugoslav Left and a director of a small private company "JPL sistems", and several others from both companies. Grmeč was a company located in Zemun and producing building insulation and floor covering. Lukić explained to those present at the meeting that it was decided that the rocket fuel should be produced in "Grmeč", considering that "Grmeč" has the appropriate double-roller machine, while "JPL sistems" is the only company with the recipe for ammonium perchlorate. Umčanin immediately agreed to the deal, without asking for any profit for Grmeč. Lukić explained that the production of the rocket fuel was of vital interest to the Serbian army efforts in the Bosnian War, which was a lie. The fuel was intended to be exported to Libya, which was then under international sanctions, just like Yugoslavia. Lukić did not explain why this operation was to be done through a private company, and not through the Military, and why a company not registered for the production of rocket fuel (JPL sistems) would by in charge. Two days later, on 15 May, a new meeting was organized in "Grmeč", where detailed plans of the operation were made, again in the presence of Lukić, Umčanin and Čobanin. The fuel was to be produced in secrecy, after the end of the working hours. The operation was approved by then-president of Serbia Slobodan Milošević, and SDB head Jovica Stanišić.

Friday 23 June 1995 was to be the first day of trial production. Grmeč was paid 6000 Yugoslav dinars. About 20 people were present in the floor covering plant during the trial, including the factory's technical director. The "JPL sistems" delivered around 100 kilograms of chemical components needed for production in large tin containers intended for food delivery. The whole operation was officially organized by "JPL sistems" with Grmeč as a subcontractor.

=== The explosion ===
Fatalities

1. Živorad Stefanović (42 years old)
2. Dragan Veljić (27)
3. Ljubiša Ivić (31)
4. Bora (or Borivoj) Stoisavljević (38)
5. Branko Jovanović (42)
6. Vojislav Mučibabić (44)
7. Zdravko Stančić (46)
8. Goran Maslaković (28)
9. Gojko Đukanović (48)
10. Petar Rot (48)
11. Ivica Bešić (44)

—

The plant was not designed for work with flammable or explosive materials, it was even lacking basic fire protection equipment. For that reason, firefighters were ordered to stand near the machine, ready in a case of fire. They were immediately killed by the explosion. The trial production started around 6 p.m. Half an hour later, at 6:30 p.m., a strong explosion was recorded in the plant, probably because of spontaneous ignition of the material.

No person present in the plant was left uninjured as the concrete roof collapsed. The explosion was so powerful that it left a crater more than a meter wide and thirty centimeters deep in the concrete floor. The explosion shook whole Zemun and broke windows on nearby buildings. The explosion was followed by a fire, but was quickly extinguished. The police promptly blocked the plant and whole neighborhood. Police and the SDB even prevented the inspectors from the Ministry of Labor from accessing the site. The wounded were transported either to the Zemun hospital or the Clinical Centre of Serbia.

Mayor Nebojša Čović visited the factory soon, but declined to disclose any information regarding the explosion. In the evening, the Ministry of Internal Affairs (MIA) issued a statement with the names of ten victims and 12 wounded (one person later died in the hospital, bringing the number of victims to 11). The MIA insisted that the cause of the explosion is not known and will be determined later. The investigative judge and public prosecutor claimed that the cause of the incident is "a reaction in chemical production that is currently unknown". The officials failed to disclose that one of the victims (Ivica Bešić) was not a Grmeč worker, but worked for "JPL sistems".

The same evening, prime minister Mirko Marjanović sent a letter of condolence to the victims' families in the name of the Government of Serbia. Government ministers Leposava Milićević and Branislav Ivković visited the plant in the evening. Later, letters of condolence were sent by Serbian president Slobodan Milošević, Yugoslavian president Zoran Lilić and federal prime minister Radoje Kontić. On 26 June, the federal government awarded financial assistance to the victims' families, 5000 dinars for every person killed and 2000 for every wounded. Financial assistance was also awarded by the municipality, the Grmeč company and the trade union. The material damage to the factory was assessed at 20 million dinars, as the plant building and equipment were heavily damaged. 27 June, the date of the funeral service was declared a day of mourning in the Municipality of Zemun.

== Aftermath ==
External videos
- Serbia-Chemical Factory Explosion Kills 10 People (AP report)

The official sources and government-affiliated media did not publicly acknowledge any military purposes of the exploded material. The causes of the explosion were claimed to be either "sabotage" or "diversion". The government did its best to cover up the case, so that it wouldn't be found out that multiple safety regulations were ignored.

After the incident, JPL sistems continued to work in the rocket fuel business. After liquidating JPL sistems, Radoslav Čobanin founded two new companies with the same personnel as JPL sistems. Both of Čobanin's new companies were directly involved in the production and delivery of rocket fuel for Saddam Hussein's Iraq and Muammar Gaddafi's Libya. Unčanin remained the CEO of Grmeč until the overthrow of Slobodan Milošević, after which he retired. Lukić retired in 2000 and committed suicide in 2010.

=== Investigation ===
The investigation was handled by an expert commission made up of personnel from the MIA, Security Institute (part of the SDB), and "JPL sistems". Basically, the same people responsible for the explosion were called to investigate it. Their report was confusing and contradictory. In the report, they claimed that there were no traces of any explosive material in the plant, but in another part of the report, they concluded that the cause of the explosion was ammonium perchlorate, which is an explosive material. Prosecutor's investigation only started three years after the incident. The public prosecutor Vladimir Vukčević requested the investigation be labeled a military secret "because of the martial law", although there was no martial law at the time.

Since the public prosecutor made no action, on 6 March 1996, family members of the victims filed a criminal complaint against Rajko Unčanin, CEO of Grmeč, and six others responsible for the explosion. In June 2000, the prosecutor Vukčević officially dropped all charges against them, although the evidence clearly pointed out that explosive materials were responsible for the incident. On 3 October 2000, district judge Života Đoinčević suspended the investigation against those responsible, claiming that "there is no criminal guilt since they acted on the orders of the President Slobodan Milošević and the head of the SDB Jovica Stanišić". On 28 December 2000, the Supreme Court vacated Đoinčević's decision, but the indictment against Unčanin and four others was filed only on 3 August 2003, more than eight years after the explosion.

=== Trial ===
The trial against Unčanin and four others finally started on 14 May 2004 in the Belgrade's District court. Beside Unčanin, defendants were Slobodan Komatina, Grmeč's technical director, Radosav Lukić, deputy head of the SDB, Vladica Božić, the person who brought the explosive materials to the plant, and Radislav Čobanin, director of "JPL sistems". The indictment charged them with "crime against public safety" and "causing danger" by organizing illegal production of explosive materials. Unčanin denied any guilt, claiming that he was unaware that the product was explosive, and shifted the blame to Vojislav Mučibabić, one of the executives who was killed in the explosion. The trial dragged on for years, being routinely postponed because of trivial reasons. Four judges changed during the trial.

In 2013, the District court acquitted all four defendants (Lukić was already dead by then), claiming that "it was impossible to determine the exact cause of explosion due to the lack of evidence." On 28 March 2014, the Appellate court upheld the verdict and all accused were acquitted.

In August 2007, Mihajlo Mučibabić, father of Vojislav Mučibabić, sued Republic of Serbia in the European Court of Human Rights, claiming violations of the human rights regarding his son's death. On 12 July 2016, the Court decided in Mučibabić's favor, citing that the "lack of diligence of the investigative authorities" and expressing "doubts about whether they acted in good faith". The court ordered Serbia to pay 12,000 euro in reparations and 3,000 euro in court costs to Mučibabić. Serbia was found in breach of the Article 2 of the European Convention on Human Rights (the right to life). Later, prosecutor Vukčević gave an interview in which he blamed Vojislav Mučibabić for the explosion, and declined to comment the involvement of the SDB, citing "state secrecy".

In 2011, the Constitutional Court of Serbia found that there were deficiencies in the investigation and that Mučibabić is entitled to compensation. Despite the decisions of the European Court and the Constitutional Court, no further effort was made to serve the justice in the Grmeč case and it slowly fell into obscurity.

== See also ==
- List of explosions
- List of industrial accidents
