= Air Force Command Building, Belgrade =

Air Force Command Building
- Команда ратног ваздухопловства Komanda ratnog vazduhoplovstva
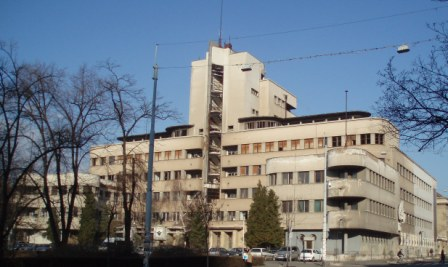
- Air Force and Air Defence HQ

- Location within Belgrade

General information
- Status: Cultural Heritage
- Location: Zemun, Belgrade, Serbia
- Coordinates: 44.8415°N 20.4132°E
- Current tenants: Air Force and Air Defence
- Completed: 1935; 91 years ago
- Owner: Government of Serbia
- Landlord: Serbian Armed Forces

Technical details
- Floor count: 4 (7 towers)

Design and construction
- Architect: Dragiša Brašovan

Air Force Headquarters (Serbian: Команда ратног ваздухопловства, romanized: Komanda ratnog vazduhoplovstva) is the monumental edifice, situated at 12 Aviatic Square in Zemun, Belgrade, the capital of Serbia.

The first medical commission for the pilots started its work in the Command Building in 1945, which was actually the precursor of the Air Force Medical Institute. On 15 February 1957, the Air Force Museum was founded in this building.

== Description ==
The Air Force Command Headquarters, designed by the eminent architect Dragiša Brašovan, was constructed in 1935, on the site of the former Military Command in Zemun. It represents one of the most original works of the architect Dragiša Brašovan, and an important work of the Yugoslav modern architecture in the period between the two world wars. According to the total volume, for a long time it was one of the largest buildings in Zemun. It was conceived as an independent block building, while at the same time forming the whole with the Zemun Military Command Building at 5 Glavna Street. It has a ground floor and four floors overlooked by a well-proportioned seven-storey tower whose asymmetrically shaped volume is accentuated by the central dominant. The symmetrical arrangement of the front facade is emphasized by the front side-wings encompassing the ground floor and the first two floors. Its side facade is characterized by the rhythm of the openings and the carefully and unobtrusively placed voluminous statue of Icarus, the work of the sculptor Zlata Markov (Žitište 1908 – Novi Sad 1986), whose mythological symbolism is associated with the meaning and the purpose of the building. The structure's quality is originality, visual expressiveness, inner dynamics and an affinity for details. The Air Force Command Building has considerable architectural, cultural and historical values.

The Air Force Command Building in Zemun represents one of the most successful works of the architect Dragiša Brašovan and one of the most significant buildings of the period of Modernism constructed within the Old Core of Zemun.

During the bombing on 5 April 1999, at 04:18 in the morning, the building was damaged in the NATO attack, with two missiles hitting the central segment from the Glavna Street and the tower from the courtyard side. In June 2000, a memorial plaque to the fallen members of the Air Force and Air Defence, during the air strikes in 1999 was set up in front of the right projection of the front facade. The reconstruction of the building was done after the original design in 2000-2001. The design of this edifice was presented in 2015 at the exhibition in Vienna, where the works of our local architects were displayed, in the style of modernism, the architectural movement which marked the existence of Yugoslavia in the 20th century.

== The Gallery ==
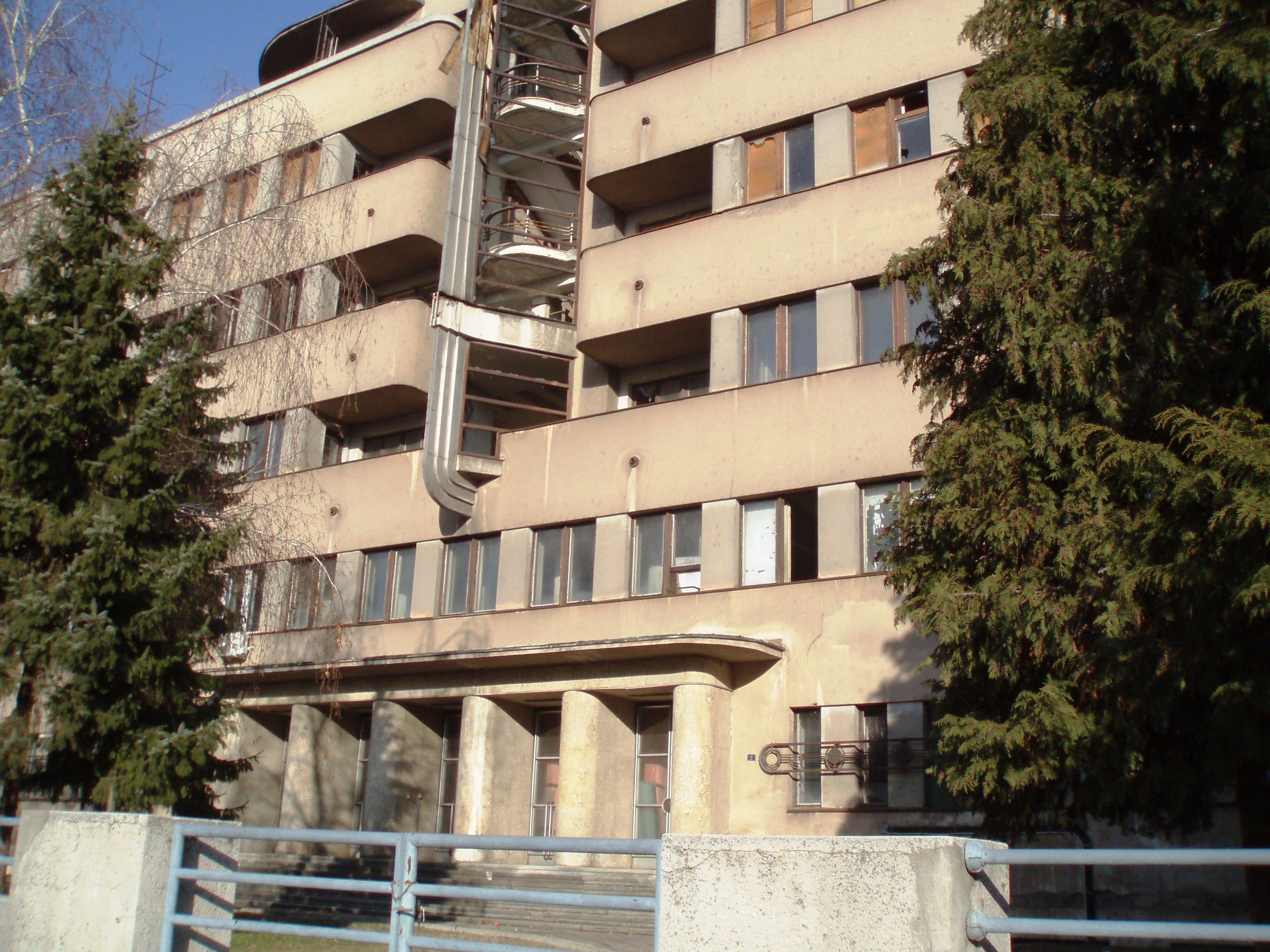
The main entrance

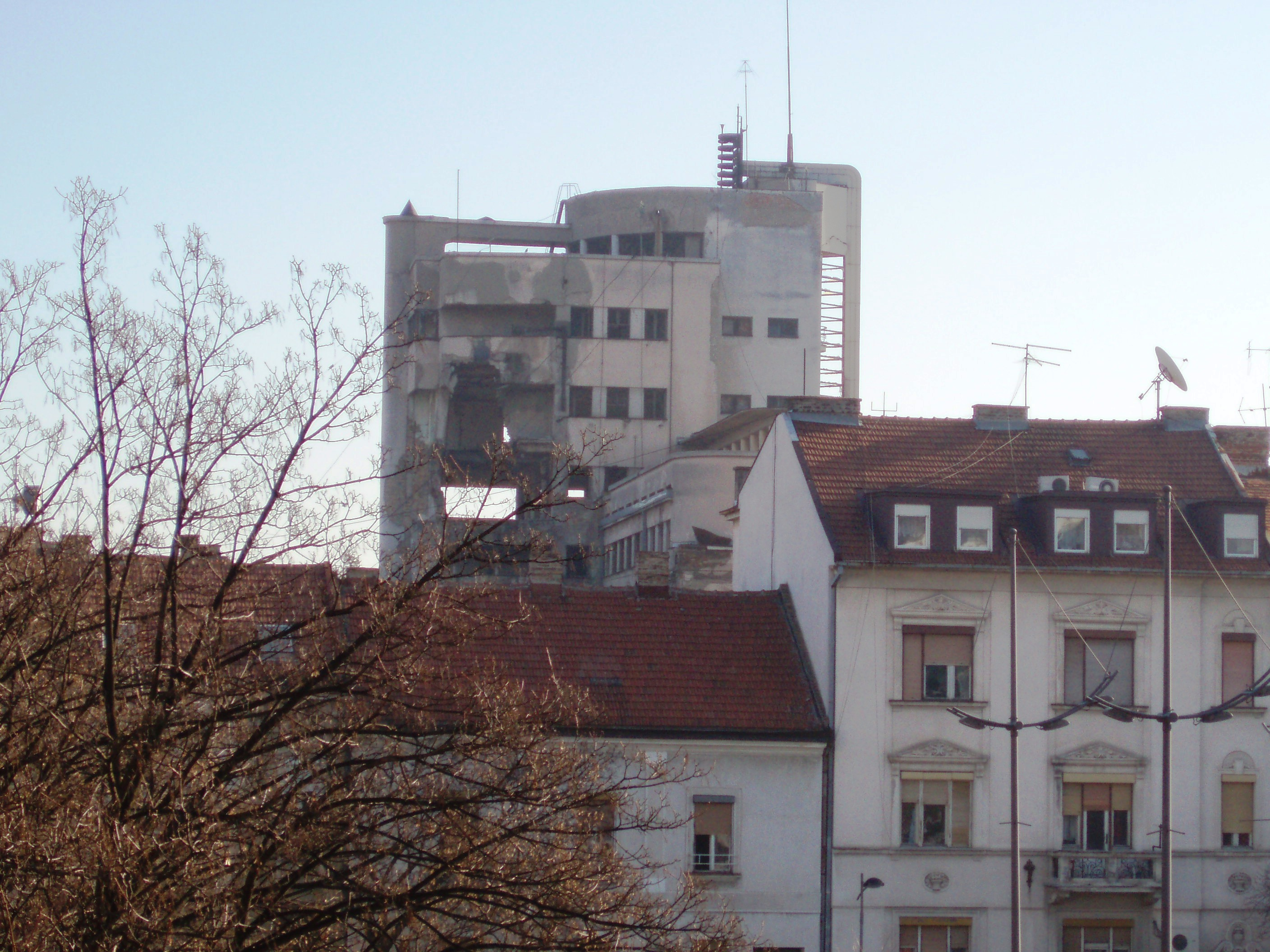
Damages from the NATO air strikes

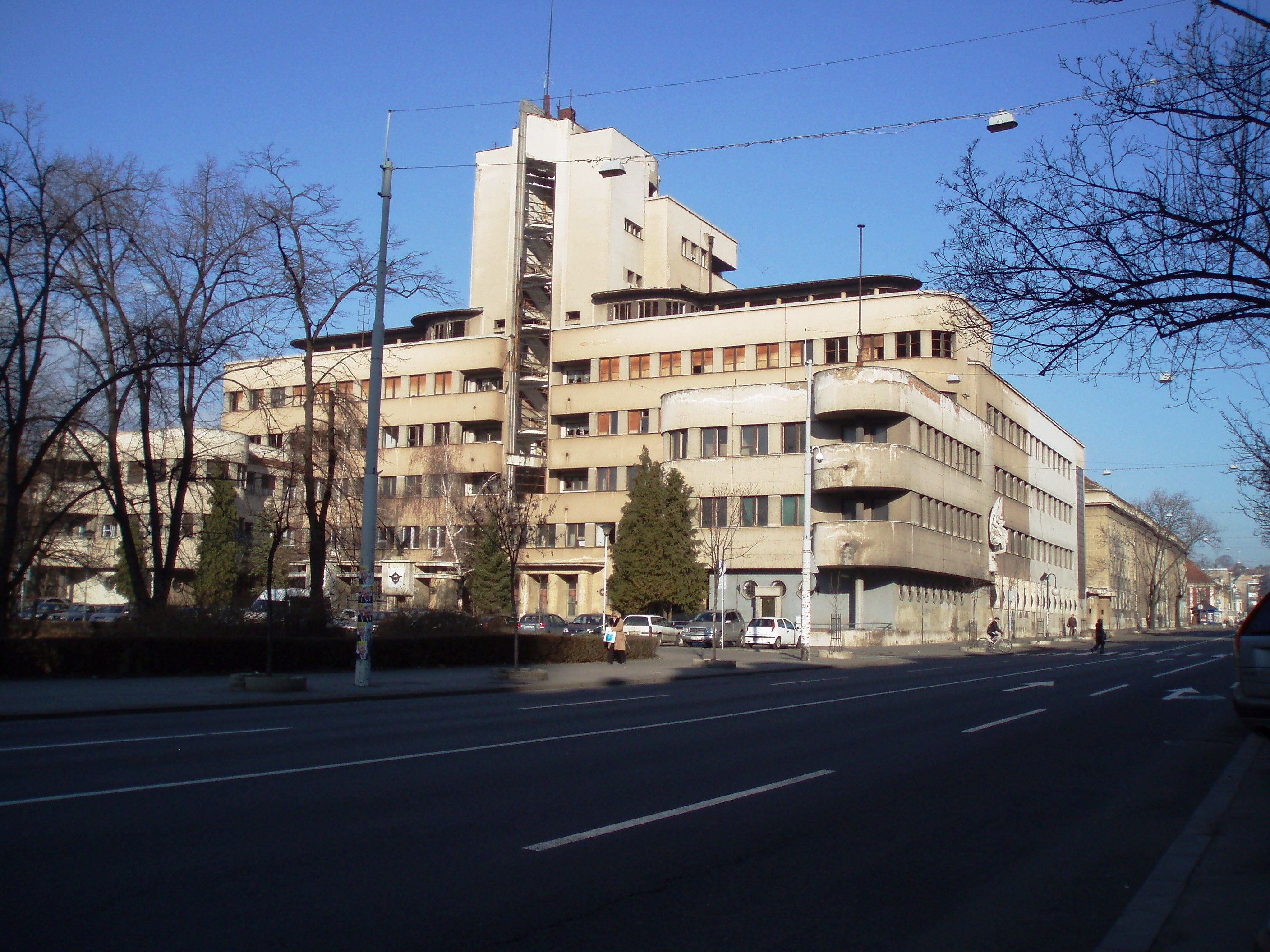
The Air Force Command Building

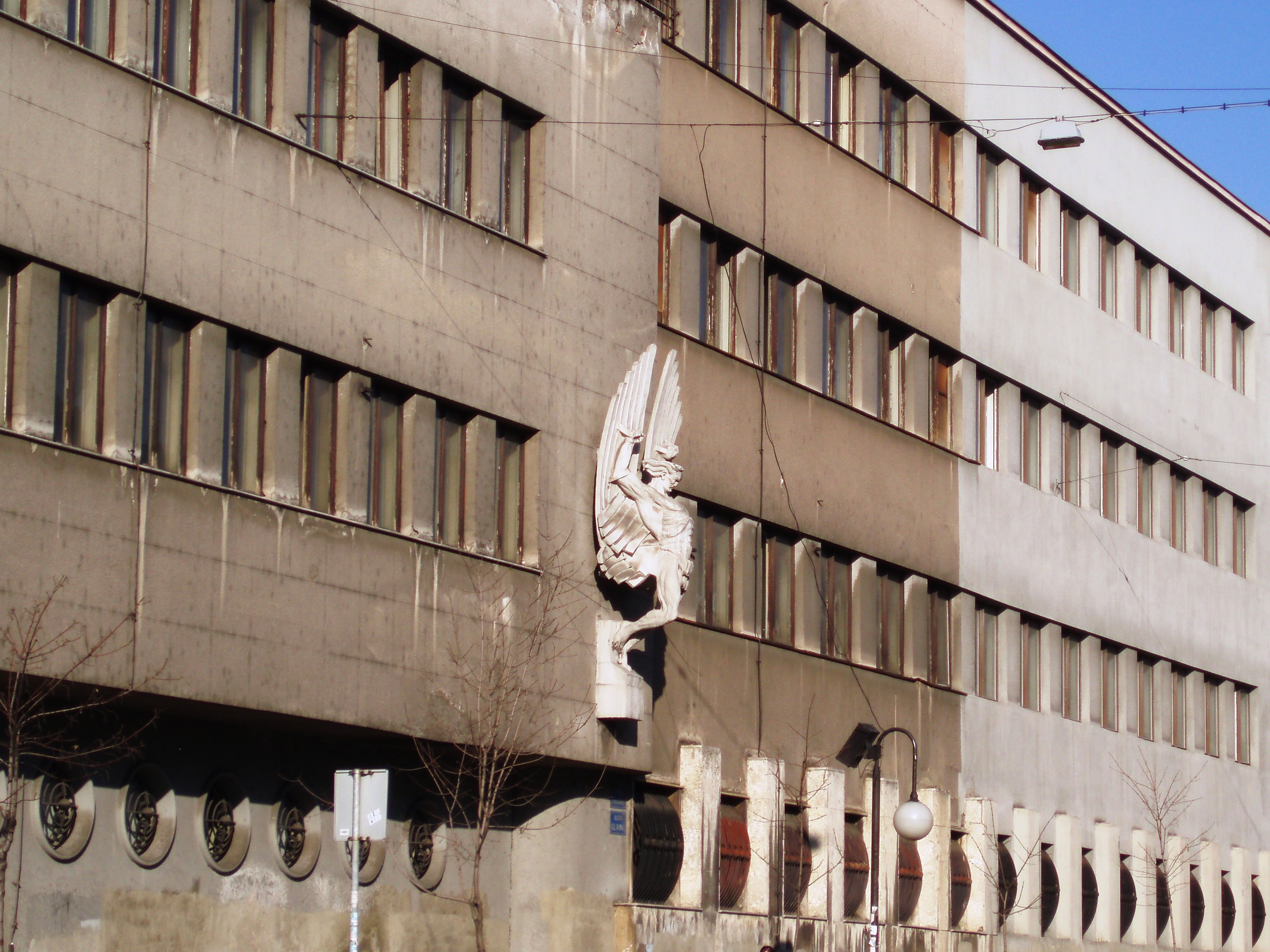
The view from the Glavna Street

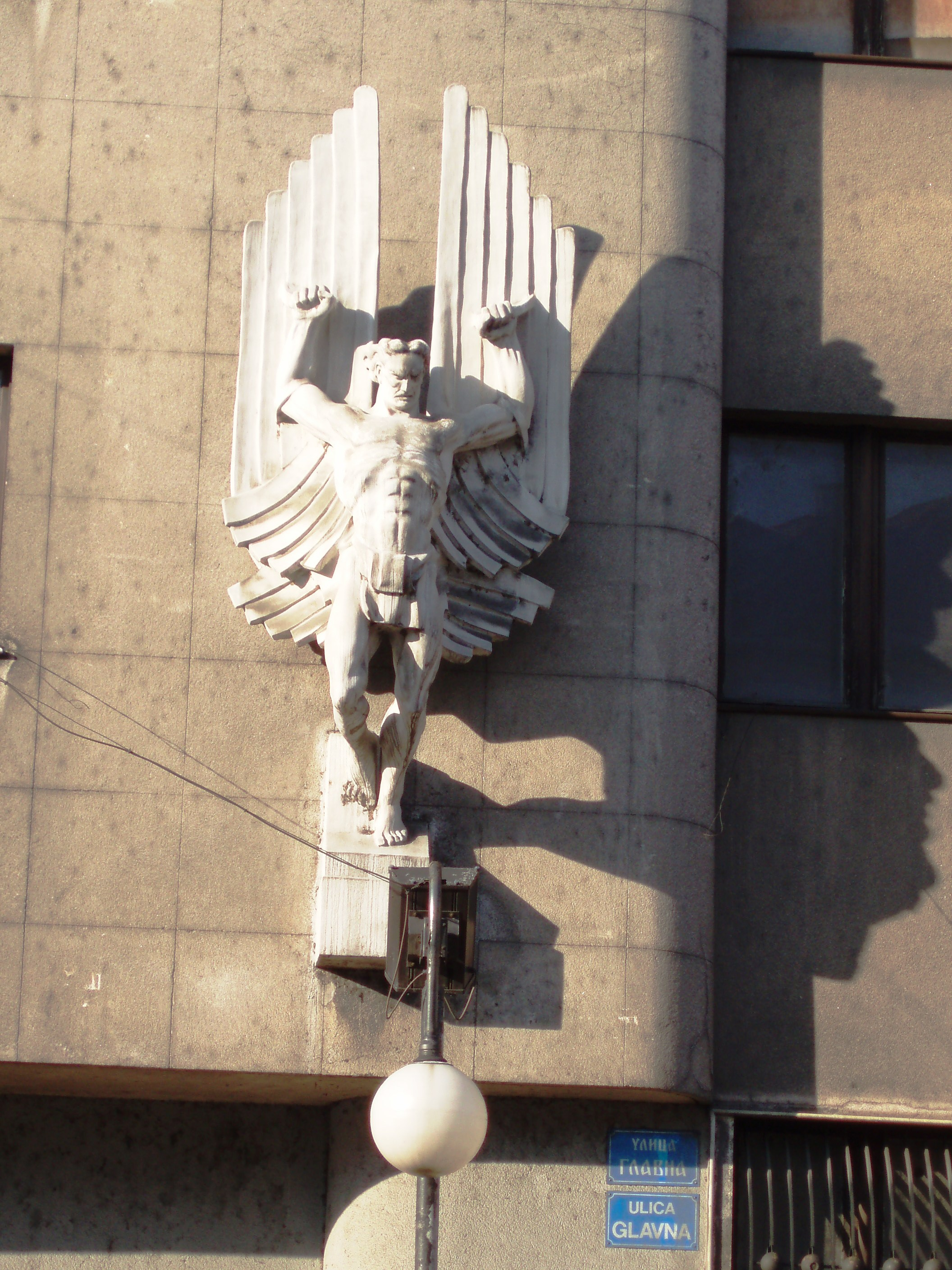
The Statue of Icarus on the Facade
