= 18th Cavalry (India) =

Indian Army regiment

- Active: 1842; 184 years ago 1921; 105 years ago (as 18th Cavalry)–present
- Country: India
- Allegiance: British India (1921-1947); Dominion of India (1947-1950); India (1950-)
- Branch: British Indian Army (1921-1947); Indian Army (1947-)
- Type: Cavalry
- Size: Regiment
- Part of: Indian Army Armoured Corps
- Mottos: साहस और सम्मान; Saahas Aur Samman (Courage and honour)
- Main battle tank: T-72
- Engagements: Gwalior campaign First Anglo-Sikh War; Third Ango-Burmese War; 1882 Anglo-Egyptian War; First World War; Second Mohmand Campaign; Second World War; Indo-Pakistani War of 1965; Indo-Pakistani War of 1971
- Battle honours: Punniar; Moodkee; Ferozeshah; Sobraon; Egypt 1882; Tel-El-Kebir; Punjab Frontier

Commanders
- Colonel of the Regiment: Lieutenant General Mohit Malhotra

The 18th Cavalry is an armoured regiment of the armoured corps of the Indian Army. The regiment was created in 1921 through the amalgamation of the 7th Hariana Lancers and 6th King Edward's Own Cavalry.

== Formation ==
The regiment was formed in 1921 by the amalgamation of the 6th King Edward's Own Cavalry and the 7th Hariana Lancers to form the 6th/7th Cavalry. This designation was quickly changed in 1922 to 18th King Edward's Own Cavalry.

These two regiments themselves had undergone many changes:

- 6th King Edward's Own Cavalry : 1842 – raised at Fatehgarh as 8th Regiment of Bengal Irregular Cavalry, 1861 – 6th Regiment of Bengal Cavalry, 1883 – 6th (The Prince of Wales's) Regiment of Bengal Cavalry, 1901 – 6th (Prince of Wales's) Bengal Cavalry, 1903 – 6th Prince of Wales's Cavalry, 1906 – 6th King Edward's Own Cavalry.
- 7th Hariana Lancers : 1846 – raised at Cawnpore and Meerut as 16th Regiment of Bengal Irregular Cavalry, 1847 – 17th Regiment Bengal Irregular Cavalry, 1861 – 7th Regiment of Bengal Cavalry, 1900 – 7th Regiment of Bengal Lancers, 1901 – 7th Bengal Lancers, 1903 – 7th Lancers, 1904 – 7th Hariana Lancers.

The composition of the regiment after the amalgamation in 1921 consisted of Kaimkhanis, Rajputana Rajputs, and Jats. The present class composition is of Jats from Uttar Pradesh, Haryana and Rajasthan; Rajputs from Uttar Pradesh, Madhya Pradesh, and Rajasthan and Hindustani Mussalmans from all over India, but mainly from Uttar Pradesh and West Bengal.

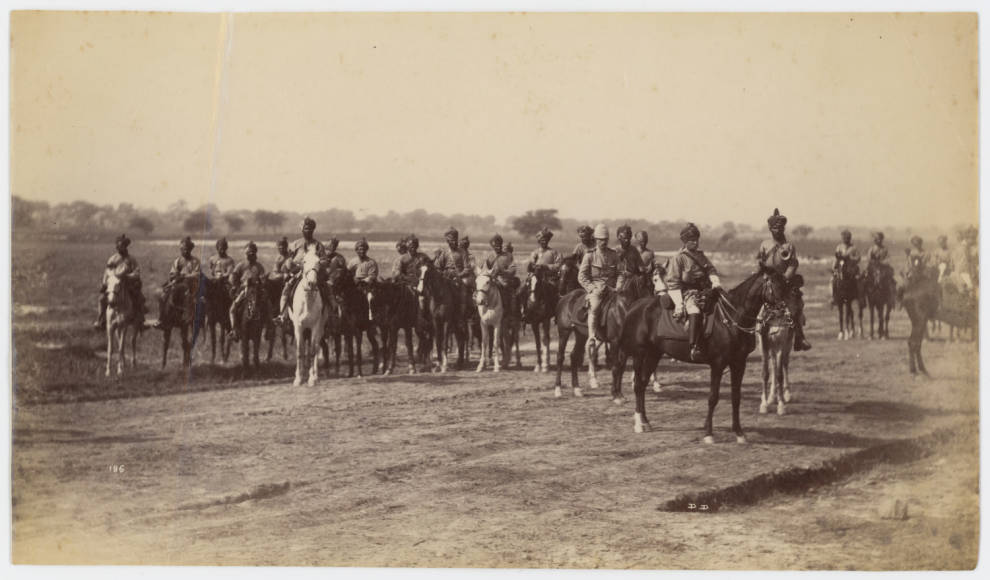
7th Bengal Cavalry (from DeGolyer Library, Southern Methodist University)

In 1936, the unit was renamed 18th King Edward VII's Own Cavalry when Edward VIII was expected to ascended the throne to make clear it was named for King Edward VII. In 1940 it became the second to last cavalry regiment to be mechanised, leaving only the 17th Queen Victoria's Own Poona Horse still mounted on horses (though it too would be mechanised a month later).

== Military operations between 1921 and 1939 ==
The regiment, while still mounted cavalry, took part in the August to September 1933 Mohmand and Bajaur operations and the July to October 1935 Loe-Agra and Mohmand operations. The 1935 operations was to suppress the Mohmands, north of the Khyber Pass, after their raiding on the plains and attacks on road construction parties. The campaign witnessed a night operation to capture the heights around the Nahakki Pass.

=== Second World War ===
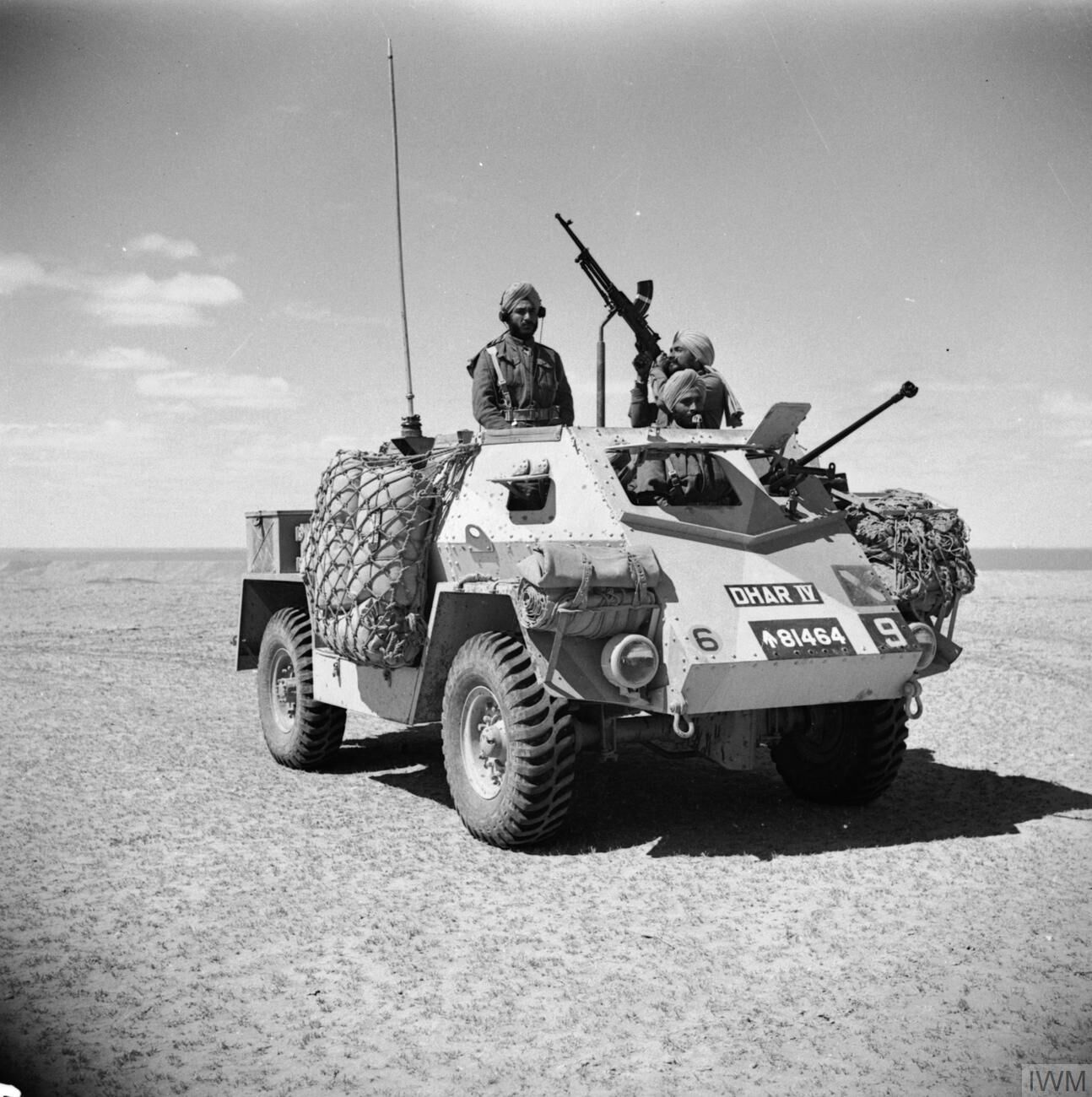
An Indian Pattern Carrier Mk IIA named 'Dhar IV', North Africa, 10 April 1942 of the type used by 3rd Indian Motor Brigade.

In December 1940, during the Second World War, the regiment was mechanised. It formed part of the 3rd Indian Motor Brigade, which was initially part of the 1st Indian Armoured Division.

The brigade was detached from the division, and dispatched to Egypt in late January 1941, along with its units including the 18th King Edward's Own Cavalry. The regiment then served in the Western Desert campaign. The regiment, and the brigade, were attached to a number of different formations that included the 2nd Armoured Division, the 7th Armoured Division, and the 9th Australian Division who they were with during the Siege of Tobruk. The regiment also supplied men for the Indian Long Range Squadron. The brigade was later overrun by the Italians during the Battle of Gazala, and took some days to reform. After the brigade re-formed, the regiment was equipped as follows: Cavalry Carrier - 2 x Reconnaissance Squadron, 1 x AT Squadron.

On 30 June, the brigade was ordered to hand over 50 per cent of its vehicles to the Eighth Army, and was dispersed; the regiment was allotted to the defence of the Nile Delta and guard duties. In August, the brigade re-formed and was allocated the regiment. It travelled overland to Sahneh, in Persia via Baghdad, and was placed under the command of the 31st Indian Armoured Division (formally the 1st Indian Armoured Division). In late November it then moved to Shaibah, 7 miles (11 kilometres) from Basra. From here the regiment returned to India in January 1943, and the brigade was reconstituted as the 43rd Indian Infantry Brigade (Lorried) at Shaibah at the end of January 1943. In the middle of the year, the regiment moved to Rawalpindi and commenced conversion to a light cruiser regiment, which was successfully completed by the end of the year. The regiment was split up after that, and elements were serving in different parts of India when the Japanese surrender came in August 1945.

18th King Edward's Own Cavalry won the following gallantry awards during the Second World War:

- Order of the British Empire — Major L.M. Murphy
- Distinguished Service Order — Major H.O.W. Fowler
- Military Cross — Captain J.M. Barlow, Captain J.W. Prentice, Second Lieutenant G Annesley Cooke
- Indian Order of Merit — Jemadar Jage Ram, Jemadar Aman Singh
- Indian Distinguished Service Medal — Risaldar Hasham Ali Khan, Squadron Daffadar Major Kanshi Ram, Lance Daffadar Bajid Khan, Sowar Jit Ram, Sowar Abhe Ram, Sowar Abdi Khan, Sowar Alim Khan
- Mentioned in despatches — 5

== Post Independence changes ==
When India was partitioned in 1947 and the Indian Army split between the new created states of India and Pakistan, the 18th King Edward's Own Cavalry was allocated to India.

When India became a republic in 1950, the regiment's title was changed to that of 18th Cavalry.

== Operations in independent India ==
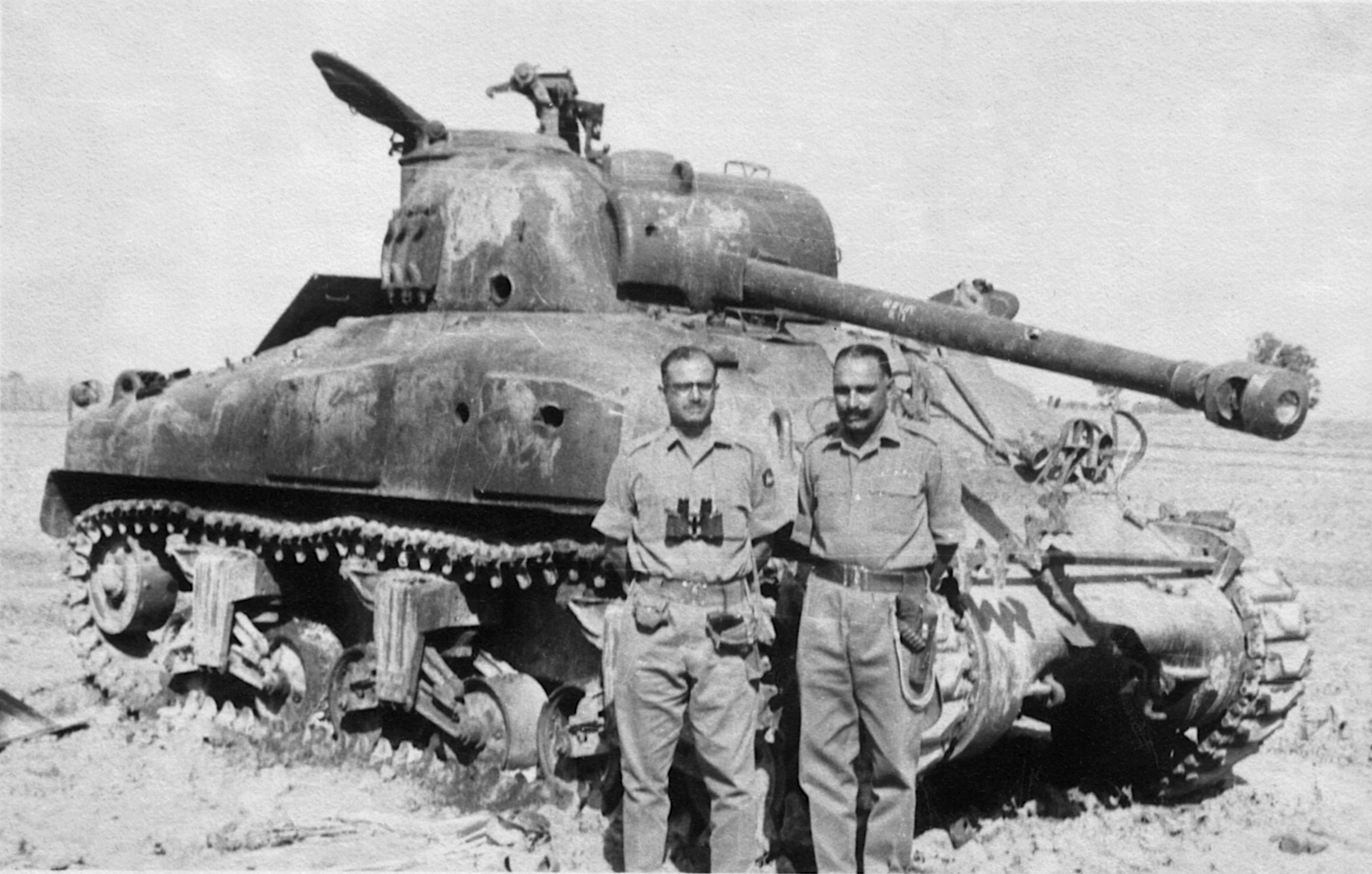
The then Commandant, Lieutenant Colonel Hari Singh Deora with a destroyed Pakistani Sherman tank during the 1965 Indo-Pakistani War.

=== Indo-Pakistani War of 1965 ===
During the Indo-Pakistani War of 1965, the regiment fought a series of isolated armour battles as part of the 1st Armoured Division in the approaches to Sialkot. They left behind 29 destroyed enemy tanks, and Naib Risaldar Mohd. Ayub Khan was awarded the Vir Chakra. Seven were mentioned in despatches.

=== Indo-Pakistani War of 1971 ===
During the Indo-Pakistani War of 1971, the regiment saw action in the Fazilka sector. Naib Risaldar Noor Mohammed Khan was awarded the Vir Chakra.

=== Other operations ===
The regiment has participated in Operation Vijay, Operation Parakram, and undertaken counter-insurgency operations in Jammu and Kashmir, where it was awarded the GOC-in-C (Northern Command) Unit Citation.

== Battle honours ==
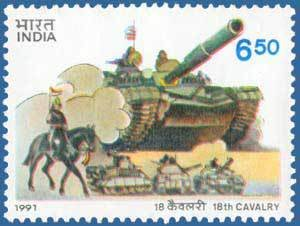
1991 postage stamp

The regiment was awarded the following battle honours:

Awarded to 6th King Edward's Own Cavalry

Punniar, Moodkee, Ferozeshah, Sobraon, Egypt 1882, Tel-el-Kebir, Punjab Frontier

Awarded to 7th Hariana Lancers

Punjaub, Burma 1885–87

First World War

Awarded in 1926 for services of predecessor regiments
Somme 1916, Morval, Cambrai 1917, France and Flanders 1914–18, Megiddo, Sharon, Damascus, Palestine 1918, Shaiba, Kut-al-Amara 1915, Ctesiphon, Tigris 1916, Mesopotamia 1915–16

Second World War

El Mechili, Defence of Tobruk, The Kennels, North Africa 1940–43

Independent India

Jammu and Kashmir 1965, Tilkapur-Muhadipur, Punjab 1965.

== President’s Standards ==
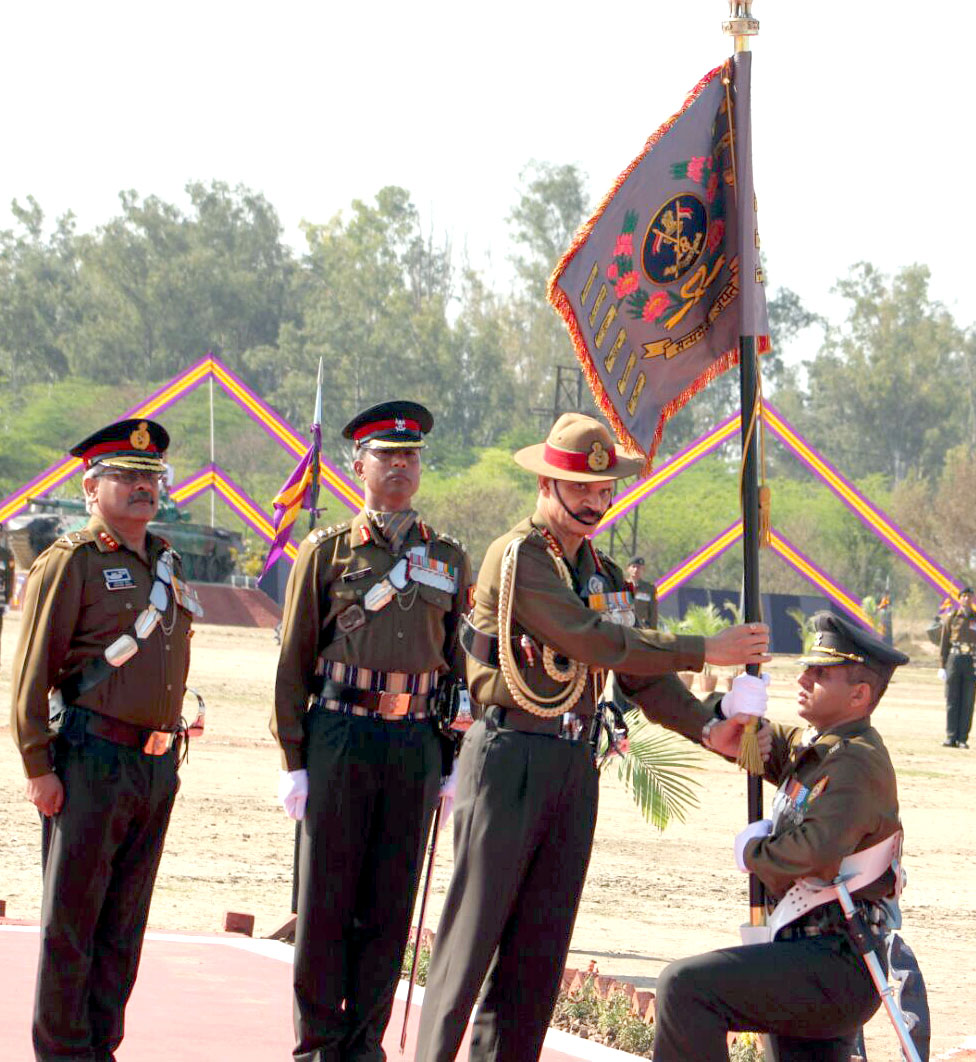
The Chief of Army Staff, General Dalbir Singh presenting the President's 'Standard' to 18 Cavalry, in Amritsar on 7 March 2016

The President of India, Neelam Sanjiva Reddy presented a guidon to the regiment at Amritsar on 26 March 1980.

On 7 March 2016, the regiment was presented the President's Standards at Amritsar by General Dalbir Singh, Chief of the Army Staff, on behalf of the President of India, Mr Pranab Mukherjee.

== Equipment ==
The regiment shed its horses and was converted to a motorised cavalry regiment equipped with anti-tank guns in 1940. This gave way to tanks in 1943 with the introduction of the Stuart tanks. They were succeeded by the Sherman tanks in 1946, the T-54s in 1966, and finally the T-72s in 1983.

== Regimental insignia ==
The current regimental insignia consists of crossed lances with pennons. Each of the pennons have scrolls with the words सत्यमेव (Satyameva) and जयते (Jayate). Satyameva Jayate translates to 'Truth alone triumphs'. The crossed lances are overlaid with the numeral '18' mounted by the Ashoka Lion Capital and a scroll at the base with the words 'Cavalry'.

The motto of the regiment is साहस और सम्मान (Saahas Aur Samman), which translates to 'Courage and honour'.

== Notable personnel ==
- Lieutenant General Gurdev Singh Kler
- Major General Jagatbir Singh
- Major General Gurcharan Singh Sandhu, PVSM
- Brigadier Hari Singh Deora, AVSM
- Risaldar Major (Hon. Captain) Mohammed Ayub Khan VrC served the regiment and was a two time member of the Lok Sabha and the Union minister of State for agriculture in the Government of India headed by P. V. Narasimha Rao.
