= 1935 in India =

- Centuries: 18th; 19th; 20th; 21st
- Decades: 1910s; 1920s; 1930s; 1940s; 1950s
- See also: List of years in India; Timeline of Indian history

Events in the year 1935 in India.

== Incumbents ==
- Emperor of India – George V
- Viceroy of India – The Earl of Willingdon

== Events ==
- National income - ₹25,298 million
- 31 May – The 7.7 M_{w} Quetta earthquake shook British India with a maximum Mercalli intensity of X (Extreme), killing 30,000–60,000.
- Dr. BR. Ambedkar ended all 3 temple entry movement in 1935.
- Government of India act

== Law ==
- 2 August – Government of India Bill, became law; it provided for development of a popular constitution.

== Births ==
- 2 January – Syed Jahangir, Bangladeshi painter (died 2018)
- 19 January – Soumitra Chatterjee, actor. (died 2020)
- 24 January – Shivabalayogi, Indian yogi (died 1994)
- 1 March – Ajoy Roy, Bangladeshi academic (died 2019)
- 5 March – Shamsuddin Qasemi, Bangladeshi Islamic scholar and politician (died 1996)
- 17 March – Muhammad Ashiq, Pakistani cyclist (died 2018)
- 7 April – S. P. Muthuraman, film director.
- 3 May – Sujatha, author, short story writer and playwright (died 2008).
- 25 May – Neela Ramgopal, Carnatic musician (died 2023)
- 7 June
  - Thomas Kailath, Indian-American engineer, author, and educator
  - Shyama, actress (died 2017)
- 21 June – Pratap Chauhan, cricketer
- 22 June – Vaman Kumar, cricketer
- 25 June – Udey Chand, wrestler and wrestling coach
- 30 June – Animesh Chakravorty, chemist
- 2 July
  - Guruvayur Dorai, percussionist
  - Amar Singh Sokhi, cyclist
- 10 July – P. K. Gurudasan, politician
- 18 July – Jayendra Saraswathi, Shankaracharya of Kanchi Kamakoti Peetham.
- 1 August – Mohinder Pratap Chand, writer and poet. (died 2020)
- 14 August – Radha Charan Gupta, historian of mathematics (died 2024)
- 23 September – Prem Chopra, actor.
- 30 September – Shamsur Rahman Faruqi, poet and literary critic (died 2020)
- 24 October – Mark Tully, journalist (died 2026)
- 13 November – P. Susheela, playback singer
- 24 November – Salim Khan, actor and scriptwriter.
- 28 November – S. P. Hinduja, businessman (died 2023)
- 8 December – Dharmendra, actor (died 2025).
- 11 December – Pranab Mukherjee, politician and minister. (died 2020)

=== Full date unknown ===
- Khalish Dehlavi, poet.
