= 1938 in India =

- Centuries: 18th; 19th; 20th; 21st
- Decades: 1910s; 1920s; 1930s; 1940s; 1950s
- See also: List of years in India; Timeline of Indian history

Events in the year 1938 in India. Indian independence – Government of India Act gives Indians a role in governing their provinces.

== Incumbents ==
- Emperor of India – George VI
- Viceroy of India – Victor Hope, 2nd Marquess of Linlithgow

== Events ==
- National income - ₹29,799 million
- Minor engagements on the North West Frontier throughout the year.

== Law ==
- December – Announcement that the Ottawa trade agreement would not be continued after 31 March 1939.
- Good Conduct Prisoners' Probational Release Act
- Insurance Act
- Manoeuvres, Field Firing and Artillery Practice Act
- Cutchi Memons Act

== Births ==
- 5 January – Sukumar Barua, Bangladeshi poet (died 2026)
- 7 January – B. Saroja Devi, actress (died 2025)
- 13 January
  - Shivkumar Sharma, musician. (died 2022)
  - Nabaneeta Dev Sen, novelist, children's author and poet (died 2019)
- 2 February – Qamruddin Ahmad Gorakhpuri, Islamic scholar (died 2024)
- 10 March – Ijaz Butt, Pakistani cricketer (died 2023)
- 18 March – Shashi Kapoor, Bollywood actor. (died 2017)
- 31 March – Sheila Dikshit, politician and Chief Minister of Delhi (died 2019)
- 9 April – Ahmad Kamal, Pakistani diplomat (died 2023)
- 23 April – S. Janaki, playback singer.
- 5 May – Chandrama Santha, politician (died 2021)
- 19 May – Girish Karnad, writer, playwright, actor and director. (died 2019)
- 10 June – Rahul Bajaj, businessman (died 2022)
- 12 June – Yesudasan, political cartoonist (died 2021)
- 1 July
  - Hariprasad Chaurasia, classical flutist
  - Durai Murugan, lawyer and politician
- 9 July – Sanjeev Kumar, actor (died 1985).
- 13 July – Thomas Savundaranayagam, Sri Lanka Tamil priest, former Roman Catholic Bishop of Jaffna
- 15 July – Pilot Baba, Indian Air Force fighter pilot, later guru (died 2024)
- 18 July – R. K. Krishna Kumar, business executive (died 2023).
- 19 July
  - Dom Moraes, poet, writer and columnist (died 2004)
  - Jayant Narlikar, astrophysicist (died 2025)
- 25 July – Sudhir Kakar, psychoanalyst and writer. (died 2024)
- 8 September – Poornachandra Tejaswi, writer and novelist (died 2007)
- 18 September – Amalendu Chakrabarti, Indian political cartoonist(died 2023)
- 24 September – Piloo Reporter, cricket umpire (died 2023)
- 2 October – Sajid Mir, Pakistani politician and Islamic scholar (died 2025)
- 13 October – Mahboob Shah, Pakistani cricket player and umpire
- 17 November – Shamim Hanafi, Urdu scholar (died 2021)
- 21 November – Helen, actress and dancer
- 11 December – T. S. R. Subramanian, politician (died 2018)

=== Full date unknown ===
- Shashi Deshpande, novelist.
- Manohar Singh, theatre director and actor. (died 2002)

== Deaths ==
- 16 January – Sharat Chandra Chatterji, novelist (born 1876).
- 21 April - Allama Muhammad Iqbal, Poet, politician (born 1877 )
- 14 November – Mahatma Hansraj, educationist, Arya Samaj leader (born 1864)
