= S. K. Chakravorty =

Major General S. K. Chakravorty AVSM, SC, SM**
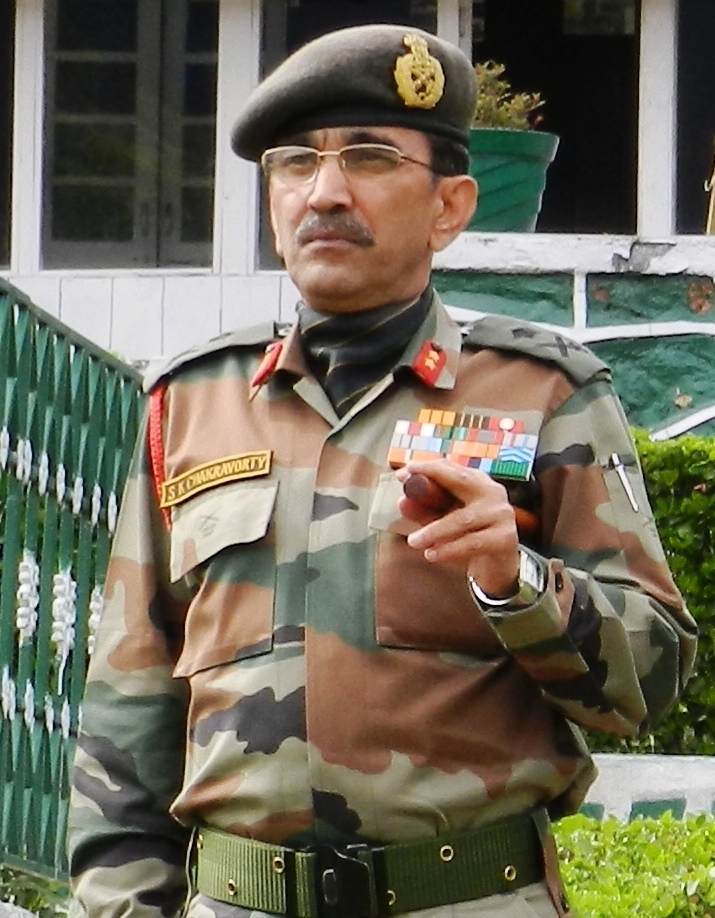
- Born: 1955 (age 70–71); Jhansi, Uttar Pradesh, India
- Military career
- Allegiance: India
- Branch: Indian Army
- Service years: June 1977 - July 2013
- Rank: Major general
- Unit: 18 Garhwal Rifles
- Commands: 28th Infantry Division; Inspector General (Operations) - National Security Guard (NSG); 69th Mountain Brigade; 18 Garhwal Rifles
- Conflicts: Kargil War, Operation Rakshak
- Awards: Ati Vishist Seva Medal; Shaurya Chakra; Sena Medal; Bar to Sena Medal

Major General Samir Kumar Chakravorty, AVSM, SC, SM & bar (born 1955) is a former General Officer of the Indian Army. He last served as the General officer commanding 28 Infantry Division. During the Kargil War in 1999, he commanded 18 Garhwal Rifles which received the Chief of the Army Staff’s unit citation and the Battle Honour Drass and the Theatre Honour Kargil for feats of gallant action.

== Early life and education ==
Chakravorty was born in Jhansi, Uttar Pradesh in 1955 and completed his schooling from Christ the King College, Jhansi. After graduating, he went on to join the Indian Military Academy and was commissioned in June 1977. He is an alumnus of the Defence Services Staff College and the National Defence College.

== Military career ==
Chakravorty has been presented with three gallantry awards and two distinguished service awards. During his 36 years of military career, some of his more prominent assignments included General Officer Commanding (GOC) of the 28 Infantry Division of the Indian Army (J&K), Inspector General - Operations (IG-Ops), National Security Guard (NSG) and Commanding Officer (CO) of the 18th battalion of the Garhwal rifles during Kargil war.

In 1985, he was awarded the Sena Medal (Gallantry) as Captain in the Scouts Battalion of the Garwhal Rifles for a rescue operation above 22,000 feet in Mana Sector, Jammu. Later, in 1993 as a Major, he was awarded the Chief Of Army Staff Commendation Card (COAS CC) for his service during Operation Ashwamedh – the only successful counter hijack operation in Amritsar that witnessed the successful rescue of all 141 hostages of the Indian Airline Boeing 737.

As Lieutenant Colonel, in 1996 he received the Shaurya Chakra – the third highest peacetime gallantry award in India – for acts of Gallantry in Jammu and Kashmir during Operation Rakshak.

He was awarded a second Sena Medal in 1999 (Bar to Sena) as the Commanding Officer of 18 Garhwal Rifles during Operation Vijay in Kargil (also known as the Kargil War). His battalion that fought the war was awarded six Vir Chakras, eleven Sena Medals, and 10 Chief Of Army Staff Commendation Cards (COAS CC). Over twenty days, 18 Garwhal Rifles launched three attacks – two at point 5100 and one at point 4700.

In 2011, Major General Chakravorty led Operation Ginger - a retaliatory strike against Pakistan along the Line of Control. The Operation was a direct response to surprise attack on an Indian army post in the Kupwara region that killed 6 soldiers. According to media reports, the strike resulted in at-least 13 Pakistani casualties. Later, in 2012, General Chakravorty received the Ati Vishist Seva Medal for distinguished service as the General Commanding Officer during Operation Rakshak for the Counter Insurgency and Counter Terrorist Operations in the Kupwara and Gurez sectors in the Kashmir region.

== Awards and decorations ==

	Ati Vishisht Seva Medal	Shaurya Chakra	
Sena Medal & Bar	Wound Medal (India)	Samanya Seva Medal	Operation Vijay Star
Operation Vijay Medal	Operation Parakram Medal	Sainya Seva Medal	High Altitude Medal
50th Anniversary of Independence Medal	30 Years Long Service Medal	20 Years Long Service Medal	9 Years Long Service Medal

== Personal life ==
Chakravorty is married to Bipasha Chakravorty, daughter of Colonel Bimalango Chatterjee who was killed in action in the Indo-Pakistani War of 1965. The couple has two daughters Ishani Chakravorty who is a fashion entrepreneur and Major Sarmishta Chakravorty who is presently serving as a doctor with the Indian Army.
