= 1939 in India =

- Centuries: 18th; 19th; 20th; 21st
- Decades: 1910s; 1920s; 1930s; 1940s; 1950s
- See also: List of years in India; Timeline of Indian history

Events in the year 1939 in India.

World War II breaks out and political dead lock in India

== Incumbents ==
- Emperor of India – George VI
- Viceroy of India – Victor Hope, 2nd Marquess of Linlithgow

== Events ==
- National income - ₹31,845 million

=== January - June ===
- 2 January – The Muslim League at Patna disapproves the Federation scheme which has already been disapproved by Congress.
- 29 January – Subhas Chandra Bose is reelected president of Congress at Bombay (a victory for opponents of Federation).
- 22 February – Thirteen right-wing members of the working committee, including Pandit Nehru, resign from Congress.
- 3 March – In Bombay, Mohandas Gandhi begins to fast in protest of the autocratic rule in India.
- 12 March – Congress at Tripuri passes a resolution of adherence to the party of Gandhi.
- 29 April – S. C. Bose resigns as president of Congress and is succeeded by Rajendra Prasad.
- 1 May – New Congress working committee announced.
- 3 May – S. C. Bose announces the formation of a new left bloc under his leadership.

=== July - December ===
- 3 September - Lord Linlithgow declares Emergency in British India.
- 8–14 September – Congress debates its attitude to the war; Gandhi calls upon the British to implement their declarations of faith in democracy.
- 18 September – The Muslim League declares that the Federal scheme, now suspended, should be altogether abandoned.
- 17 October – The Viceroy states the Allied objectives in the war and announces that at the end of the war the Government would consult the several communities, parties and interests in India.
- 27–31 October – Congress working committee resolved that the Viceroy's statement was wholly unsatisfactory and asked for a statement of war aims; the ministries of Bombay, Madras and Bihar resign.
- 3 November – Resignation of the ministry of the United Provinces.
- 5 November – Resignation of the ministry of Orissa; the Viceroy announces that the parties having met have failed to agree.
- 9 November – Resignation of the ministry of Central Provinces.
- 23 November – At Allahabad the Congress working committee reaffirms its demand for "recognition of India's independence".
- 2 December - Jinnah's call for observing 22nd as Day of Deliverance in favour of resignation and end of congress ministries in provinces.
- 27 December – The first contingent of Indian troops reaches France.

== Law ==
- 28 February – The budget is presented to the Legislative Assembly in which the duty on raw cotton is doubled.
- 13 March – The Chamber of Princes approves its own reorganization.
- 20 March – A new trade agreement with the UK till 31 March 1942 is signed after two years of negotiations.
- 15 April – The new tariff bill is rejected by the Central Legislature.
- 18 April – The Council of State passes the new tariff bill a second time.
- Registration Of Foreigners Act
- Portuguese Code of Civil Procedure
- Commercial Documents Evidence Act
- Dissolution of Muslim Marriages Act
- Limitation Act

== Births ==
- 11 March – Bani Basu, author, essayist, critic and poet.
- 19 May – Balu Mahendra, film director and cinematographer (d. 2014).
- 27 June – R. D. Burman, composer, singer (died 1994)
- 7 July – Satya Prakash Agarwal, politician
- 20 July – Walter Devaram, retired Indian Police Service officer
- 25 July – Mahendran, Indian film director, screenwriter and actor (d. 2019)
- 1 August – Jambuwantrao Dhote, Indian politician (d. 2017).
- 16 August – Kanchana, actress.
- 17 August – Farooq Feroze Khan, Pakistani air chief marshal (d. 2021)
- 15 September – Subramanian Swamy, Indian politician and economist.
- 29 October – Malay Roy Choudhury, poet and novelist (died 2023
- 22 November – Mulayam Singh Yadav, politician and former Chief Minister of Uttar Pradesh (died 2022)
- 14 December – Mythili Sivaraman, activist (died 2021)

=== Full date unknown ===
- Arun Joshi, novelist (died 1993).

== Deaths ==
- 6 February – Sayajirao Gaekwad III, Maharada of Baroda (b. 1863)
- 14 February – Samsa, playwright, poet and novelist (b. 1898)
- 8 September – Swami Abhedananda, mystic (b. 1866)
- 20 November – Dinesh Chandra Sen, Bengali writer and folklorist (b. 1866)
