= ILRS =

ILRS may refer to:

- Indian Long Range Squadron – unit of the British Indian Army during World War II
- International Laser Ranging Service – network of observation stations providing accurate measurement of satellite orbits
- International League of Religious Socialists – umbrella organization of religious socialist movements in political parties throughout the world
- International Lunar Research Station (ILRS) – planned lunar base currently being led by Roscosmos and the China National Space Administration
