= 1932 in India =

- Centuries: 18th; 19th; 20th; 21st
- Decades: 1910s; 1920s; 1930s; 1940s; 1950s
- See also: List of years in India; Timeline of Indian history

Events in the year 1932 in India.

== Incumbents ==
- Emperor of India – George V
- Viceroy of India – The Earl of Willingdon

== Events ==
- National income - ₹20,286 million
- Third civil disobedience campaign.
- 3 January – British arrest and intern Mohandas Gandhi and Vallabhbhai Patel.
- February – Terrorism in Bengal.
- 16 May – Massive riots between Hindus and Muslims in Bombay – thousands dead and injured.
- 25–28 June - Indian Cricket Team play their first ever Test match.
- 11 August – India wins the Gold Medal in Field Hockey at the Los Angeles Olympics.
- 17 August – Government award as to representation published.
- 20 September – Mohandas Gandhi begins a hunger strike in Poona prison.
- 24 September – Gandhi approves a compromise.
- 1 October - Port Haj Committee Act 1932 was passed which set up concept of embarkation points for Hajj.
- 8 October – Indian Air Force established.
- 15 October – J. R. D. Tata flew from Karachi to Madras via a de Havilland Puss Moth.

=== Undated ===
- Ahmedabad landing on a grass strip at Juhu paving the way for civil aviation in India.
- Gurjar Veer silent film is released.
- Poona Pact between Gandhi and Ambedkar

== Law ==
- Indian Partnership Act
- Criminal Law Amendment Act
- Tea District Emigrant Labour Act

== Births ==
- 1 January – Shamsul Islam, Bangladeshi politician (died 2018)
- 6 January – Kamleshwar, writer, screenwriter, critic and essayist (died 2007)
- 7 January – Obaid Siddiqui, neurogeneticist (died 2013)
- 5 February – Shankha Ghosh, poet and literary critic (died 2021)
- 13 February
  - V. Balakrishnan, writer and translator (died 2004)
  - Leela Devi, writer, translator, and teacher (died 1998)
- 1 May – S. M. Krishna, politician (died 2024)
- 18 May – D. Pandian, politician (died 2021)
- 1 June – Ashis Roy, marathon runner
- 7 June – M. S. Narasimhan, mathematician (died 2021)
- 12 June – E. Sreedharan, IES
- 22 June
  - Sharad Moreshwar Hardikar, orthopedic surgeon
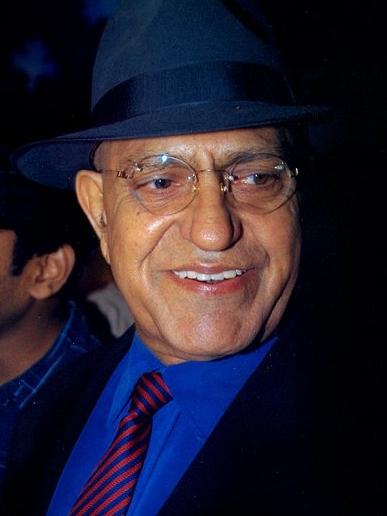
  - Amrish Puri
    Amrish Puri, actor (died 2005)
- 20 August
  - Chandrakant Bakshi, author (died 2006)
  - M. G. S. Narayanan, historian (died 2025)
- 17 September – Indarjit Singh, journalist and broadcaster
- 26 September – Manmohan Singh, politician, prime minister of India (died 2024)
- 27 September – Yash Chopra, director and producer (died 2012)
- 29 September
  - Hamid Dalwai, social reformer and writer (died 1977)
  - Mehmood, actor, director and producer (died 2004)
- 29 October – Ranjit Das, Bangladeshi football player and coach (died 2026)
- 5 December – Nadira, actress (died 2006)
- 13 December – Padmini, actress and dancer (died 2006)
- 21 December – U. R. Ananthamurthy, writer and critic (died 2014)
- 25 December – Raees Mohammad, cricketer (died 2022 in Pakistan)
- 28 December– Dhirubhai Ambani, businessman, founder of Reliance Group (died 2002 in India)
- Unknown
  - Abdul Gani Bhat, Kashmiri separatist leader (died 2025)
  - Saida Sherif, broadcaster, educationalist, humanitarian and poet (died 2023)
