= 1934 in India =

- Centuries: 18th; 19th; 20th; 21st
- Decades: 1910s; 1920s; 1930s; 1940s; 1950s
- See also: List of years in India; Timeline of Indian history

Events in the year 1934 in India.

== Incumbents ==
- Emperor of India – George V
- Viceroy of India – The Earl of Willingdon

== Events ==
- National income - ₹22,775 million
- 15 January – The 8.0 M_{w} Nepal–Bihar earthquake shakes the Himalayas with a maximum Mercalli intensity of XI (Extreme), leaving 6,000–10,700 dead.
- 25 February - Mahatma Gandhi visits Udupi.
- 7 April – Mahatma Gandhi suspended his campaign of civil disobedience.
- July – The Communist Party of India is declared unlawful.
- September – Gandhi is successful in forcing the hand of the caste Hindus in favour of the depressed classes in the scheme of representation.
- G. Edward Lewis discovers 'man-like ape' fossils in Northern India. They are named Ramapithecus and Sugrivapithecus, after Rama and Sugriva.
- Unsuccessful attempts on the life of Sir John Anderson, Governor of Bengal.
- Protection was granted to the steel industry till 31 March 1941 subject to preference for English steel under the Ottawa agreement.
- Formation of Congress Socialist Party

== Law ==
- 54-hour week passed.
- Reserve Bank of India Act passed
- The graduates of Dehra Dun Academy could, by a new law, get the Governor-General's commission in the army and the Navy.
- Sugarcane Act
- Indian Aircraft Act
- Petroleum Act
- Dock Labourers Act

== Births ==
- 7 January – Jamila Massey, actress and writer.
- 9 January – Mahendra Kapoor, playback singer (died 2008).
- 22 January
  - Vijay Anand, filmmaker, producer, screen writer, editor and actor (died 2004).
  - Sugathakumari, poet and activist (died 2020)
- 2 February – Haripal Kaushik, field hockey player and commentator (died 2018)
- 27 February – Manoj Das, writer (died 2021)
- 15 March – Kanshi Ram, politician and founder of Bahujan Samaj Party (died 2006).
- 21 March
  - Ved Mehta, writer (died 2021 in the United States)
  - Buta Singh, politician, Minister of Home Affairs (1986–1989), Governor of Bihar (2004–2006) and Chairman of NCSC (died 2021)
- 29 March – Shahryar Khan, Pakistani diplomat and politician (died 2024)
- 31 March – Kamala Surayya, poet and author (died 2009)
- 24 April – Jayakanthan, writer, essayist, journalist, pamphleteer, film-maker and critic (died 2015).
- 16 May – Leela Nambudiripad, children's writer (died 2021)
- 19 May – Ruskin Bond, children's writer.
- 24 May – M. S. Valiathan, cardiac surgeon (died 2024)
- 31 May – Bhagwatikumar Sharma, author and journalist (died 2018)
- 1 June – Mohan Kumar, Indian director (died 2017)
- 16 June – Kumari Kamala, dancer and actress
- 23 June – Virbhadra Singh, Chief Minister of Himachal Pradesh
- 12 July – May Routh, Indian-born British-American costume designer (died 2022)
- 21 July – Chandu Borde, cricketer.
- 8 August – Sudakshina Sarma, Ammamese singer (died 2023)
- 4 November – Vijaya Mehta, theatre and film director and actress.
- 5 November – Rashid Byramji, horse trainer (died 2022)
- 18 November – C. N. Balakrishnan, Indian politician (died 2018)
- 6 December – Savitri, actress and dancer (died 1981)

=== Full date unknown ===
- Kedarnath Singh, poet. (died 2018)
- J. P. S. Uberoi, sociologist (died 2024)

== Death ==
- C. Sankaran Nair, former Indian National Congress president (b.1857)
