= 1933 in India =

- Centuries: 18th; 19th; 20th; 21st
- Decades: 1910s; 1920s; 1930s; 1940s; 1950s
- See also: List of years in India; Timeline of Indian history

Events in the year 1933 in India.

== Incumbents ==
- Emperor of India – George V
- Viceroy of India – The Earl of Willingdon

== Events ==
- National income – ₹ 19,502 million
- January – Extensive prosecutions of Communists for treason.
- Pakistan Declaration published
- Indian National Congress meeting at Calcutta prevented by the police.
- 1 May – Gandhi released.
- 8 May – Mohandas Gandhi begins a 3-week hunger strike because of the mistreatment of the lower castes.
- 1 August – Rearrest of Gandhi; released on 24 August.
- Gandhi transfers charge of Congress to Nehru.
- 26 November – A 20 year old landlord from Pakur named Amarendra Chandra Pandey was killed using a Biological agent.

== Law ==
- Indian Wireless Telegraphy Act

== Births ==
- 8 January – Supriya Devi, Bengali actress (born in Burma, now Myanmar) (died 2018).
- 14 February – Madhubala, actress (died 1969).
- 18 February – Nimmi, actress. (died 2020).
- 4 April – Balan K. Nair, actor (died 2000).
- 28 June – V. Sasisekharan, molecular biologist.
- 15 July – M. T. Vasudevan Nair, writer and film director (died 2024).
- 20 July – Roddam Narasimha, scientist (died 2020).
- 1 August – Meena Kumari, actress and poet (died 1972).
- 13 August – Madhur Jaffrey, actress and writer.
- 31 August – Dhiru Parikh, poet, writer and critic (died 2021).
- 5 September – Laxminarayan Ramdas, admiral (died 2024).
- 27 September – Nagesh, comedian actor (died 2009).
- 16 October -- Vinodini Champaklal Shah, educator.
- 3 November – Amartya Sen, economist, philosopher and winner of the Nobel Memorial Prize in Economic Sciences in 1998.
- 8 December – Narenda Kumar, mountaineer and soldier (died 2020).

== Deaths ==
- 2 April – Ranjitsinhji, Indian cricketer and ruler of Nawanagar. (b. 1872)
- 27 September – Kamini Roy, poet and social worker (b. 1864)
