= 1936 in India =

- Centuries: 18th; 19th; 20th; 21st
- Decades: 1910s; 1920s; 1930s; 1940s; 1950s
- See also: List of years in India; Timeline of Indian history

Events in the year 1936 in India.

== Incumbents ==
- Emperor of India – George V (until 20 January), Edward VIII (until 11 December), George VI
- Viceroy of India – The Earl of Willingdon
- Viceroy of India – Victor Hope, 2nd Marquess of Linlithgow (from 18 April)

== Events ==
- National income – ₹ 28,912 million
- August 15 - India won the third consecutive hockey gold medal in the 1936 Summer Olympics (Berlin).
- 15–18 October – Religious riots in Bombay.
- 12 November - Temple Entry Proclamation in Travancore.
- 27 December - Indian National Congress conducts its first rural session in Faizpur, Jalgaon district.
- 28 December – Indian National Congress rejected new constitution.

== Law ==
- 3 March – Legislative Assembly passed a motion to terminate the Ottawa trade agreement.
- Payment of Wages Act
- Parsi Marriage and Divorce Act

== Births ==
- 8 January – Jyotindra Nath Dixit, diplomat and politician (died 2005).
- 12 January – Mufti Mohammad Sayeed, politician and former Chief Minister of Jammu and Kashmir. (died 2016).
- 24 January – Gulam Noon, Baron Noon, businessman (died 2015).
- 1 April
  - Tarun Gogoi, former Chief Minister of Assam (died 2020)
  - Abdul Qadeer Khan, Pakistani nuclear scientist born in Bhopal (died 2021)
- 29 April – Zubin Mehta, conductor
- 4 June – Nutan, actress (died 1991)
- 14 June – M. S. Gill, politician and bureaucrat (died 2023)
- July 1
  - Mihir Rakshit, economist
  - E. Ponnuswamy, politician
- 15 July – Prabhash Joshi, writer, editor and political analyst. (died 2009)
- 21 July – Rafi Usmani, Pakistani Muslim scholar. (died 2022)
- 3 August – Bannanje Govindacharya, Sanskrit scholar. (died 2020)
- 9 August – Satish Kumar, peace activist and editor.
- 13 August – Vyjayanthimala, award-winning actress and classical dancer.
- 8 September – Indu Jain, media executive and philanthropist (died 2021)
- 13 November – Suhail Zaheer Lari, Historian, author. (died 2020)
- 25 December – Ismail Merchant, film producer (died 2005).

=== Full date unknown ===
- Anand, writer.
- Narayanan Vaghul, banker and philanthropist (died 2024)

== Deaths ==
- 28 February – Kamala Nehru, activist and spouse of Jawaharlal Nehru (born 1899).
- 13 August – Bhikaiji Cama, independence campaigner (born 1861).
- 19 September – Vishnu Narayan Bhatkhande, Indian classical musician (born 1860).
- 8 October – Premchand, writer in Hindi-Urdu literature and freedom fighter (born 1880).
