= 1937 in India =

- Centuries: 18th; 19th; 20th; 21st
- Decades: 1910s; 1920s; 1930s; 1940s; 1950s
- See also: List of years in India; Timeline of Indian history

Events in the year 1937 in India.

== Incumbents ==
- Emperor of India – George VI
- Viceroy of India – Victor Hope, 2nd Marquess of Linlithgow

== Events ==
- National income – ₹ 31,708 million
- Provincial autonomy begins (1 April) with Congress winning an absolute majority in many states, viz Madras, the United Provinces, Bihar, Central Provinces and Orissa. In Bombay, they were in position to form ministry with the support of independents. Non-congress coalition ministries were established in Bengal, Punjab, Sindh, NWFP (Khan Saheb defeating Muslim League) and Assam. Of them, only Punjab and Bengal were non-congress ministries. The All India Congress Committee renounced the proposition of non-acceptance of office. However, the Congress ministries did not accept office in the majority provinces, until they were assured by the Viceroy non-usage of his special powers in day-to-day administration. Muslim league fared badly in these elections, failing to secure a majority even in Muslim majority states but it still demanded that the Congress should admit its representatives in all Provincial ministries. The league refused to regard Muslims in congress ministries as representatives of the Muslim community. Congress refused to accept same, hence widening their gap. Jinnah reiterated his 14 points and took the road to two nation theory.
- 20 February – Completion of election to legislative assemblies.
- 1 April – Provincial autonomy began; Burma and Aden are separated from India.
- 13 September – The new Viceroy's speech is boycotted by Congress.
- University of Kerala was set up.
- All India Football Federation was established

== Law ==
- 1 October – The Federal Court of India was established in India under the provisions of Government of India Act, 1935 with original, appellate and advisory jurisdictions.
- Bicameral legislature of Assam province came into existence
- Agricultural Produce (Grading and Marking) Act
- Muslim Personal Law (Shariat) Application Act
- Arya Marriage Validation Act

== Births ==
=== January to June ===
- 2 January – Chandrashekhara Kambara, poet, playwright, folklorist and film director.
- 4 February – Birju Maharaj, dancer (died 2022)
- 21 February – Sabitri Chatterjee, actress.
- 22 March – Hemendra Singh Panwar, conservationist.
- 1 April – Mohammad Hamid Ansari, politician, Vice President of India
- 26 April – Stan Swamy, Roman Catholic priest (died 2021)
- 26 May – Manorama, actress. (died 2015)
- 9 June
  - Bimal Kar, Bangladeshi footballer (died 2024)
  - Ramchandra Gandhi, philosopher, grandson of Mahatma Gandhi (died 2007).
- 13 June – Raj Reddy, computer scientist.
- 24 June – Anita Desai, novelist.

=== July to December ===
- 15 July – E. A. Siddiq, agricultural scientist (died 2026).
- 24 July – Manoj Kumar, actor and director (died 2025).
- 22 August – Maria Aurora Couto, writer and educator (died 2022).
- 19 September – Saroja Vaidyanathan, choreographer of Bharatanatyam (died 2023).
- 6 November – Yashwant Sinha, politician and minister.
- 8 November – Bharath Gopi, actor, director and producer (died 2008).
- 9 November – S. Abdul Rahman, Tamil poet (died 2017).
- 2 December – Manohar Joshi, politician, 12th Chief Minister of Maharashtra (died 2024).
- 28 December – Ratan Tata, businessman, Chairman of the Tata Group (died 2024).

=== Full date unknown ===
- Jasodhara Bagchi, feminist critic and activist. (died 2015)
- Sukri Bommagowda, folk singer. (died 2025)

== Deaths ==
- 23 November – Jagadish Chandra Bose, physicist, biologist, botanist, archaeologist and science fiction writer (born 1858).
