= 1941 in India =

- Centuries: 18th; 19th; 20th; 21st
- Decades: 1920s; 1930s; 1940s; 1950s; 1960s
- See also: List of years in India; Timeline of Indian history

Events in the year 1941 in India.

== Incumbents ==
- Emperor of India – George VI
- Viceroy of India – Victor Hope, 2nd Marquess of Linlithgow
- President of the Indian National Congress - Abul Kalam Azad

== Events ==
- National income - ₹44,085 million
- June 21 - Rajendra Prasad lays the foundation stone of Scindia Shipyard at Visakhapatnam.

== Law ==
- The Delhi Restriction of Uses of Land Act, 1941
- The Berar Laws Act, 1941

== Births ==
- 6 January – Serajul Alam Khan, Bangladeshi politician and philosopher (died 2023)
- 25 March – Udyavara Madhava Acharya, writer, poet and actor (died 2020)
- 10 April – Mani Shankar Aiyar, politician and Minister.
- 17 April – Bindu, actress.
- 12 May – Hafez Ahmadullah, Bangladeshi Islamic scholar and cleric (died 2025)
- 21 June – Aloysius Paul D'Souza, Bishop of the Roman Catholic Diocese of Mangalore
- 2 July – Ashalata Wabgaonkar, actress (died 2020).
- 5 July – Nitin Desai, Under Secretary General, United Nations, 1993–2003
- 15 July – Nikhil Kumar, politician.
- 17 July – Bharathiraja, filmmaker.
- 31 July – Amarsinh Chaudhary, politician and Chief Minister of Gujarat (died 2004).
- 4 September – Sushilkumar Shinde, politician and Minister, former Chief Minister of Maharashtra.

=== Full date unknown ===
- Nirmal Kumar Ganguly, medical scientist.
- T S Krishnamurthy, civil servant, Chief Election Commissioner.
- Yasmeen Lari, Architect

== Deaths ==
- 28 March – Kavasji Jamshedji Petigara, first Indian to become the Deputy Commissioner of Police of the Mumbai Police (born 1877).
- 18 June - Ayyankali, social reformer from Kerala famous for Villu vandi Samaram of 1893 (born 1863).
- 7 August – Rabindranath Tagore, poet, artist, playwright, novelist and composer (born 1861).
- 9 November – Ganganath Jha, scholar of Sanskrit, Indian philosophy and Buddhist philosophy (born 1872).

=== Full date unknown ===
- Binodini Dasi, actress and writer (born 1862).
