= 6th King Edward's Own Cavalry =

- Active: 31 January 1842 – 1921
- Country: British India
- Allegiance: British Crown
- Branch: British Indian Army
- Type: Cavalry
- Size: Regiment
- Engagements: Gwalior campaign First Anglo-Sikh War; Anglo-Egyptian War; First World War Western Front Sinai and Palestine Campaign
- Battle honours: See below

The 6th King Edward's Own Cavalry was a cavalry regiment in the Bengal Army (1842–1895) and the British Indian Army (1895–1921) until it was amalgamated with the 7th Hariana Lancers to form the 18th King Edward's Own Cavalry.

== History ==
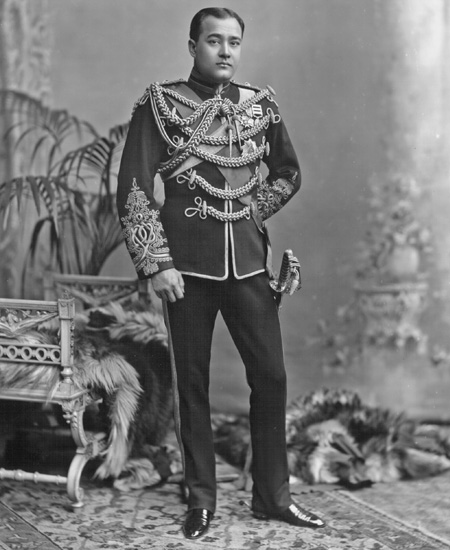
Shri Sir Nripendra Narayan, Maharaja of Cooch Behar (1862-1911); seen here in 1896 in the dismounted review order uniform of a Major of the 6th (Prince of Wales's) Bengal Cavalry

The 6th King Edward's Own Cavalry was raised at Fatehgarh in 1842 by Lt W H Ryves as the 8th Regiment of Bengal Irregular Cavalry.

Their first action was in 1843 during the Gwalior campaign in central India for which they earned the battle honour Punniar.

In 1845 they were involved in the First Anglo-Sikh War and participated in the Battle of Moodkee, the Battle of Ferozeshah and the Battle of Sobraon.

They were next in action in Egypt during the 1882 Anglo-Egyptian War where they were awarded the battle honours Egypt 1882 as a theatre honour and for the Battle of Tel-El-Kebir. It was while on service in Egypt that khaki was worn by all ranks for the first time.

During World War I they were part of the 2nd (Sialkot) Cavalry Brigade, 1st Indian Cavalry Division which arrived in France in November 1914. They were involved in the First Battle of Ypres and other actions on the Western Front but notably in the German Retreat to the Hindenburg Line and the Battle of Cambrai.

The brigade formation was:

- 17th (Duke of Cambridge's Own) Lancers
- 6th King Edward's Own Cavalry
- 19th Lancers (Fane's Horse)
- Brigade Signal Troop

They moved to Egypt in March 1918 and were transferred to 22nd Mounted Brigade. They took part in Allenby's campaign in Palestine.

The regiment then spent the period 1919–20 in West Asia on occupation duties. It returned to India in October 1920, landing at Bombay from where it took a train to Ferozepore which it reached on 15 October 1920.

In 1921, the regiment was amalgamated with the 7th Hariana Lancers to form the 6th/7th Cavalry. This was quickly changed in 1922 to 18th King Edward's Own Cavalry.

== Regimental titles ==
The regiment underwent a number of changed in title until amalgamation in 1921:

- 1842 – 8th Irregular Cavalry
- 1861 – 6th Regiment of Bengal Cavalry
- 1883 – 6th (The Prince of Wales's) Bengal Cavalry
- 1901 – 6th (Prince of Wales's) Bengal Cavalry
- 1903 – 6th Prince of Wales's Cavalry
- 1906 – 6th King Edward's Own Cavalry

== Battle honours ==
The regiment was awarded the following battle honours:

Punniar, Moodkee, Ferozeshah, Sobraon, Egypt 1882, Tel-el-Kebir, Punjab Frontier

Battle honours for the First World War were awarded in 1926 to the successor regiment. These included:

Somme 1916, Morval, Cambrai 1917, France and Flanders 1914–18, Megiddo, Sharon, Damascus, Palestine 1918

for the service of the 6th Cavalry.

== See also ==
- 7th Hariana Lancers
- 18th King Edward's Own Cavalry – successor regiment
- Bengal Army
- The Great Game

== Bibliography ==
- Becke, Archibald F. (1936). Order of Battle of Divisions Part 2A. The Territorial Force Mounted Divisions and the 1st-Line Territorial Force Divisions (42–56). London: HMSO. OCLC 4405016.
- Gaylor, John (1996). Sons of John Company: The Indian and Pakistan Armies 1903–1991 (2nd ed.). Tunbridge Wells: Parapress. ISBN 1-898594-41-4.
- Perry, F.W. (1993). Order of Battle of Divisions Part 5B. Indian Army Divisions. Newport: Ray Westlake Military Books. ISBN 1-871167-23-X.
