= Mohinder Pratap Chand =

Indian scholar (1935–2020)

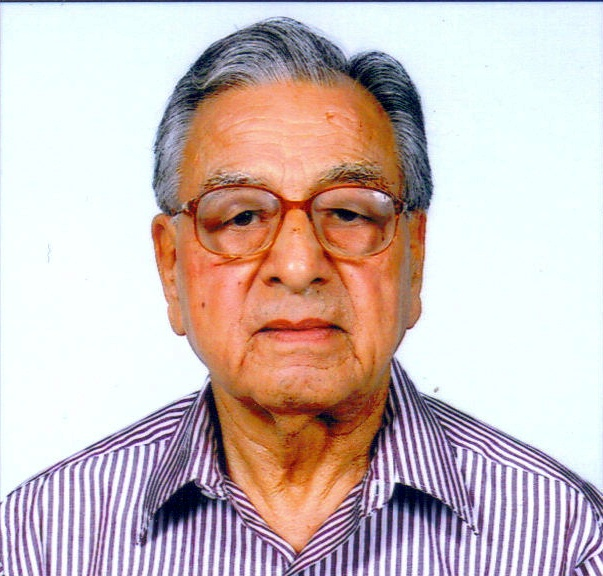
- Born: Mohinder Pratap Narang; 1 August 1935
- Died: 19 October 2020 (aged 85)
- Occupations: Urdu poet, librarian

Mohinder Pratap Chand (1 August 1935 – 19 October 2020) was an Urdu writer and poet of India who promoted Urdu language and literature in India.

== Career ==
In Kurukshetra University (India), he initiated the Bazm-e-Adab (a literary body) and introduced the study of Urdu in the University Curriculum where he taught Urdu as Teacher In-charge for 26 years. He was the author of over one dozen Urdu and Hindi books, both in poetry and prose, including children's literature in Urdu.

== Publications ==
- Harf-e-Raaz, Harf-e-Aashna and Aazar-e-Gham-e-Ishq (Anthologies of Urdu poems)
- Zakhm Aarzoo-on ke (Anthology of Urdu poems in Devnagri script)
- Urdu Text Book (Prescribed since 1986 in the school curriculum of 7th grade students of the Haryana state, India)
- ali Panipati ki Ghazlen (Devnagri script), Ed.
- Laava (A long Urdu poem by Qais Jalandhari'), Ed.
- Colon Classification: a programmed text (2 Editions in English and one in Hindi) – English ; – Hindi
- Desh Videsh Ki Kahaniyan (in Hindi), Doodh Ka Mulaya (in Hindi), Doodh ki Qimat (in Urdu) – Folktales of the world;
- 'Ujalon Ke Safeer' (a collection of research and critical articles)

== Awards and honors ==
– Honored by 'Adabi Sangam' (Kurukshetra, 1986) and 'Akhil Bharti Tarun Sangam' (Kurukshetra, 1997) for his overall contribution to Urdu and Hindi literature.

– Conferred with the prestigious 'SMH Burney Award' by Haryana Urdu Akademi (1995) for his overall contribution to the promotion of Urdu language and literature

– Honored with 'Naseem-e-Layyah Award' (2004) by the International Bazm-e-Ilm-o-fun, Layyah, Pakistan, for his contribution to Urdu Language and learning

– Conferred with 'Khwaja Altaf Hussain Hali Award' (2006) by the Haryana Waqf Board for promoting the cause of Urdu in the state of Haryana

– Honored with the Title of 'Mahtab-e-Sukhan' (2006) by Navrang Adabi Idara, Ludhiana, Punjab

– Conferred with the 'Bharat Excellence Award' for the year 2009 by the Friendship Forum of India, New Delhi, for his overall contribution to the fields of Education and Literature.

– Conferred with 'Abr Seemabi Award' for the year 2010, by Sahitya Sabha, Kaithal, Haryana, India, for his overall achievements in Urdu Language and Literature.
