= Tigris 1916 (Battle honour) =

British battle honour

Tigris 1916 was a battle honour awarded to units of the British and Imperial Armies that took part in the ultimately unsuccessful attempt to relieve the Siege of Kut in the Mesopotamian Campaign of the Great War. Battles included:

- Battle of Hanna
- Battle of Dujaila
