= Neela Ramgopal =

Indian Carnatic vocalist (1935–2023)

Vidushi Neela Ramgopal
- நீலா ராம்கோபால்
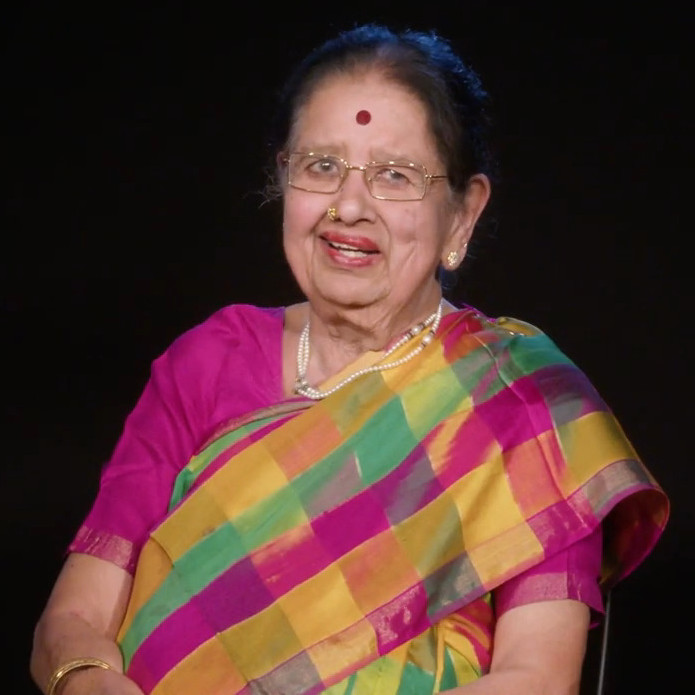
- Ramgopal in 2022
- Born: 25 May 1935; Kumbakonam, Madras Presidency, British India
- Died: 1 March 2023 (aged 87); Bengaluru, Karnataka, India
- Occupations: Singer; music teacher
- Awards: Sangeet Natak Akademi Award; Sangita Kala Acharya
- Musical career
- Genres: Carnatic music
- Instrument: Vocals
- Years active: 1965–2023

Neela Ramgopal (Note: Ramgopal was also referred to as Vidushi Neela Ramgopal with honorific title Vidushi for Carnatic music scholars.) (25 May 1935 – 1 March 2023) was an Indian Carnatic vocalist and Carnatic music teacher. Some of her works included Tamizh Inbam, Rama Upasana and Narayana Enniro. She was a recipient of awards, including the Sangeet Natak Akademi Award, the Sangita Kala Acharya Award by Madras Music Academy, and the Sangeetha Chudamani award from the Rama Seva Mandali.

== Biography ==
Neela Ramgopal was born on 25 May 1935, in Kumbakonam in Tamil Nadu into a Brahmin Iyer family. Her father was a landlord. The family migrated back to their village in Tyagarajapuram where she went to school in Thiruvidaimarudur. It was only at the age of 23, she started studying Carnatic music seriously. She started studying Carnatic music with lessons from Sadagopalachari in Kumbakonam and later under N. M. Narayanan, T. K. Rangachary and M. L. Vasanthakumari.

Ramgopal taught students from 1965, the year her very first independent public concert came in. During this time she performed regularly as a radio artist with the All India Radio rising to be an "A Top" grade artist. She published a book of 50 Tamil compositions in Kannada script. In addition, she also recorded audio CDs of krithis in all the 72 Melakartha Ragas. Some of her recorded albums includedTamizh Inbam, Rama Upasana and Narayana Enniro.

Ramgopal was noted to have trained over 700 students over her career. She was also noted to be an early adopter of technology offering her training lessons online. She received the Sangeet Natak Akademi Award, the Sangita Kala Acharya award from the Madras Music Academy and the Sangeetha Chudamani award from the Rama Seva Mandali.

== Personal life ==
Ramgopal moved to Bangalore in Karnataka after her wedding at 19, initially living in Basavanagudi before moving to J. P. Nagar. She had two children. She was known to have been a polyglot with works in Tamil, Kannada, and English, and was referred to as Neela Maami by her students.

Ramgopal died on 1 March 2023 in Bangalore. She had been diagnosed with cancer earlier. She was aged 87.

== Books ==
- Raghavan, Harini (8 November 2015). Neela Ramgopal – A Musical Journey. Nadasurabhi Cultural Association.

== Awards and honors ==
- Sangeet Natak Akademi Award 2016
- Gurukripa Award 2017
- Sangeetha Kala Acharya Award from the Madras Music Academy 2011
- Kanchana Shree title 2018 by the Kanchana Shree Lakshminarayana Music Academy Trust
- Best performer award from Sri Krishna Gana Sabha, Chennai
- Best performer award from Madras Music Academy
- Gana Prakeerthi award from the Nagarkoil Trust
- Sangeetha Kala Samragni award from the Ramakrishna Gaanasabha
- Sangeetha Chudamani award from Rama Seva Mandali
- Karnataka Kalasri award from the Karnataka state government Sangeetha Nrithya Academy
