= Syed Jahangir =

Bangladeshi painter (1935–2018)

- সৈয়দ জাহাঙ্গীর
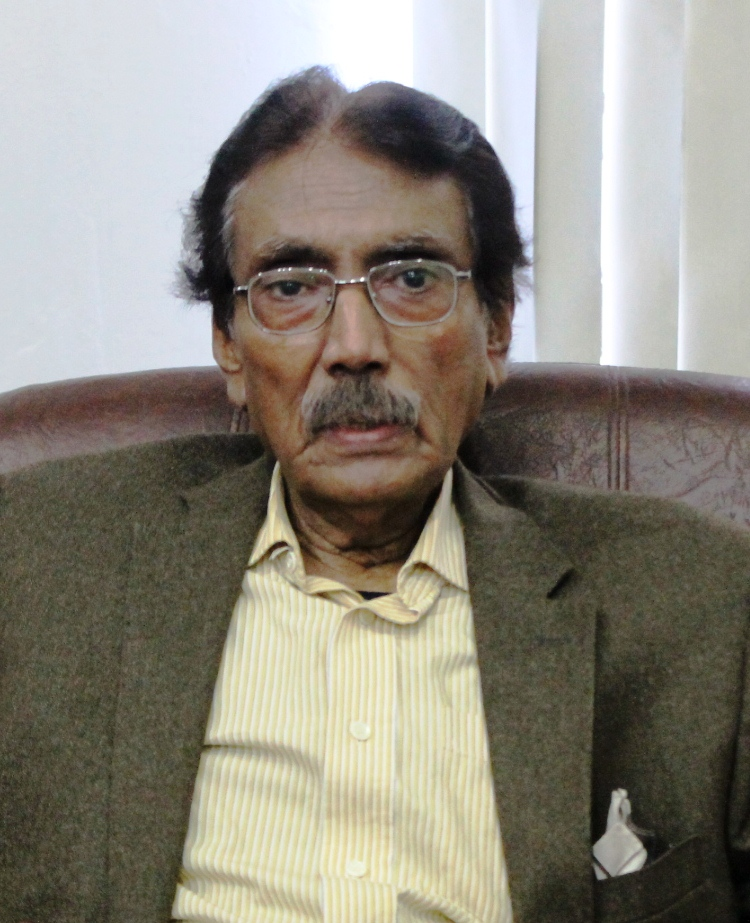
- Syed Jahangir, Dhaka (2016)
- Born: 2 January 1935; Satkhira, Bengal Presidency, British India
- Died: 29 December 2018 (aged 83); Dhaka, Bangladesh
- Website: www.syedjahangir.com

Syed Jahangir (2 January 1935 – 29 December 2018) was a Bangladeshi painter. He was awarded Ekushey Padak by the Government of Bangladesh in 1985. He served as the department head of the Arts Faculty at Shilpakala Academy in 1977. His notable paintings include Attmar Ujjibon, Ullas, Dhoni, Ojana-Oneshya and Osoni-Sangket.

== Early life and education ==
Jahangir was born in Satkhira on 2 January 1935. He graduated in Fine Arts from Government Art Institute of Arts and Crafts (now Faculty of Fine Arts, University of Dhaka). He painted for over 55 years including 9000 oils, watercolors and mixed medias. Through his career, Jahangir held 35 solo and 1 group exhibition. On 22 February 2007, one exhibition of Jahangir was held in Chitrak Gallery along with other painters such as Nitun Kundu, Samarjit Chowdhury, Rafiqun Nabi, Mahmudul Haque, Hamiduzzaman Khan and Hashem Khan.

== Awards ==
- 2011 Hamidur Rahman Award
- 2010 Lifetime Achievement Award by Berger Bangladesh
- 2005 Shashi Bhushan honourable award
- 2005 Sultan Smrity Gold Medal
- 2000 Michael Madhusudan Academy Award
- 1992 Bangladesh Charushilpi Sangsad Honour, Shilpacharya Zainul Abedin Birth Anniversary, Dhaka
- 1988 Satkhira Press Club Award
- 1985 Ekushey Padak
- 1975 Honorable mention Award at the National Art Exhibition, Dhaka
- 1958 Leaders' and Specialists' Exchange grant by the US Education Foundation
