= Gurjar Veer =

1932 film

- Directed by: Dhirubhai Desai
- Starring: Yashvant dave, Chandrika, Bhim and Himatlal
- Release date: 1932
- Country: India

Gurjar Veer is a 1932 silent black and white screen film directed by Dhirubhai Desai and was written by Jayant Bhatt. The movie was released under the Mehta Luhar production and with banner Sharda Film Co. productions in undivided British India. The photography director for the movie was Chaturbhai Patel. The film starred Yashvant Dave, Chandrika, Bhim and Himat-Lal.

== Cast ==
- Yashwant Dave
- Chandrika
- Bhim
- Himatlal
- Ghanshyam
- Dorothy

== See also ==
- History of film
