= Mihir Rakshit =

Indian economist

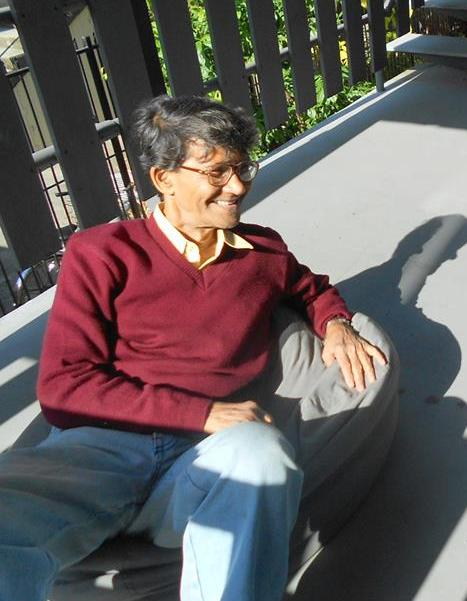
- Born: 1 July 1936 (age 90); Chittagong, Bengal Province, British India
- Education: Calcutta University; London School of Economics
- Occupations: Former Professor of Economics at Presidency College Calcutta and Former Editor in chief, icra bulletin: Money and Finance

Mihir Rakshit (born 1 July 1936) is an Indian economist, known for his work on fiscal, monetary and other policy, especially issues that concern developing economies. Originally from Chittagong, which is now in Bangladesh, he did his graduation from Presidency College, Calcutta, post-graduation from the University of Calcutta and his PhD from London School of Economics. He taught at the departments of Economics of The University of Calcutta, The University of Burdwan, Presidency College Calcutta, and Indian Statistical Institute Calcutta, as faculty. He also taught at Delhi School of Economics and Erasmus University Rotterdam, as visiting faculty. He served the Reserve Bank of India for two terms as a member of its Central Board of Directors. He was director of the open access quarterly journal Money and Finance published by ICRA Limited from 1997 to July 2016.

== Education and teaching career ==
As a student of economics in Presidency College, Calcutta. It was a College then, not an autonomous University. After this he got enrolled into Calcutta University as an MA Economics student and stood first in the MA examination.

Immediately upon completing the master's degree course, he went into teaching. He taught first at Calcutta University and then at The University of Burdwan, at Burdwan University as Head of Department of Economics. After teaching in Burdwan University for three years, he went to London, to do his PhD research at London School of Economics and Political Science. His PhD guides were Richard Lipsey and S. A. Ozga and the title of the thesis was Monetary Factors in the Theory of Growth.

While at Burdwan University, he wrote a textbook in Bengali, which became quite popular among college teachers of Economics of those times, as well as among aspirant young economists.

Rakshit joined Presidency College, Calcutta, as Professor of Economics in 1965 and was there for a long time, before joining Indian Statistical Institute Calcutta in 1992. During 1991-92, he was SBI Chair Professor of The National Institute of Public Finance and Policy (NIPFP). He had also taught at Delhi School of Economics as visiting faculty long back in nineteen seventies, and taught at Erasmus University Rotterdam in early nineties.

== Academic awards ==
=== Memorial Lectureship Medal ===
1996: Dr. Satyendranath Sen Memorial Lectureship Medal was conferred to Mihir Rakshit by The Asiatic Society.

=== Endowment awards ===
1997: UGC Swami Pranavananda Saraswati National Award, University Grants Commission of India

2016: Atul Chandra Gupta Distinguished Alumnus Award 2016, Presidency Alumni Association Calcutta.

=== Degrees awarded honoris causa ===
2005: Doctor of Science, University of Calcutta

2011: Doctor of Letters, University of Kalyani

== Publications ==
=== Books authored, edited and co-edited ===
==== Authored ====
- Arthaniti, Mulyatattwer Upakramanika (অর্থনীতি, মূল্যতত্ত্বের উপক্রমণিকা) (A. Mukherjee Pvt. Ltd, Calcutta, 1962)
- Arthaniti, Mulyatattwer Upakramanika (অর্থনীতি, মূল্যতত্ত্বের উপক্রমণিকা) Revised 2nd edition (A. Mukherjee, 1970)
- The Labour Surplus Economy: A Neo-Keynesian Approach (Humanities Press, 1983)
- Trade, Mercantile Capital and Economic Development (R.C. Dutt Lectures (Orient Blackswan, 1992)
- The East Asian Currency Crisis, (OUP, 2001)
- Macroeconomics of Post-Reform India (OUP, 2010)
- Money and Finance in the Indian Economy(OUP, 2010)

==== Edited ====
- Studies in the Macroeconomics of Developing Countries (OUP, 1989)

==== Co-edited ====
- With Manabendu Chattopadhyay and Pradeep Maiti, Planning and Economic Policy in India: Evaluation and Lessons for the Future (SAGE, 1996)
- With Amitava Bose and Anup Sinha, Issues in Economic Theory and Public Policy: Essays in Honour of Professor Tapas Majumdar (OUP, 1997)
- With M. Govinda Rao, Public Economics Theory and Policy: Essays in Honor of Amaresh Bagchi (SAGE, 2011)

=== Chapters in books ===
Uses and Abuses of Instruments for Resource Mobilization: The Indian Experience, in Robert E.B. Lucas and Gaustav F. Panpanek, The Indian Economy: Recent Development and Future Prospects (Westview Press, 1988)

Effective Demand in a Developing Economy: Approaches and Issues, in Mihir Rakshit (ed.), Studies in the Macroeconomics of Developing Countries (OUP, 1989)

The Analytical Framework of Keynes, in Krishna Bharadwaj and Sudipta Kaviraj (eds.), Perspectives on Capitalism Marx, Keynes, Schumpeter and Weber (SAGE,1989)

Underdevelopment of Commodity, Credit and Land Markets: Some Macroeconomic Implications, in Mihir Rakshit (ed.), Studies in the Macroeconomics of Developing Countries (OUP, 1989)

Aspects of Foreign Trade in a Developing Economy, in Ashok Guha (ed.), Economic liberalization, industrial structure, and growth in India (OUP, 1990)

Trade and Exchange Rate Policy with a Binding Foreign Exchange Constraint, in Pranab Bardhan, Mrinal Dutta-Choudhuri and T.N. Krishnan (eds.), Development and Change: Essays in Honour of K.N.Raj (OUP, 1993)

Issues in Structural Adjustment of the Indian Economy, in Edmar L. Bacha (ed.), Economics in a Changing World: Development, Trade and the Environment (Macmillan, 1994)

Development Economies: A Synoptic View, introductory chapter of Sukhomoy Chakravarty, Writings on Development (OUP, 1997)

Money, Credit and Government Finance in a Developing Economy, in A. Bose, M. Rakshit and A. Sinha (eds.), Issues in Economic Theory and Public Policy: Essays in Honour of Professor Tapas Majumdar (OUP, 1997)

On the Inflationary Impact of Budget Deficit, in Deena Khatkhate (ed.), Money & Finance: Issues, Institutions, Policies (Orient Longman, 1998)

Globalisation of Capital Market: Some Analytical and Policy Issues, in Servaas Storm and C. W. M Naastepad (eds.), Globalisation and Economic Development: Essays in Honour of J.George Waardenburg (Edward Elgar Publishing, 2001)

Some Macroeconomies of India's Reform Experience, in Kaushik Basu (ed.), Kaushik Basu (ed.), India's Emerging Economy: Performance and Prospects in the 1990s and Beyond (MIT Press, 2004)

Budget Deficit: Sustainability, Solvency and Optimality, in Amaresh Bagchi (ed.), Readings in Public Finance (OUP, 2005).

Some Macroeconomic Aspects of Foreign Trade: A Structuralist Perspective, in Sajal Lahiri and Pradip Maiti (eds), Economic Theory in a Changing World: Policymaking for Growth (OUP, 2005)

India's Macroeconomic Puzzles, in K L Krishna and A Vaidyanathan (eds.), Institutions and Markets in India's Development: Essays For K.N. Raj (OUP, 2007)

Budgetary Rules and Plan Financing: Revisiting the Fiscal Responsibility Act, in Public Economics Theory and Policy: Essays in Honor of Amaresh Bagchi (SAGE, 2010)

Research in Social Sciences: Availability and Utilization of Resources, in M. V. Nadkarni and R. S. Deshpande (eds.), Social Science Research in India: Institutions and Structure (Academic Foundation, 2012)

Financial Crisis and Liquidity Trap: Some Theoretical and Policy Perspectives, in S Mahendra Dev and P. G. Babu (eds.), Development in India Micro and Macro Perspectives (Springer, 2015)

India's Growth Cycles -- Resolving Some Theoretical and Empirical Issues, in Soumyen Sikdar (ed.), The Post-reform Indian Economy An Unfolding Story: In Memoriam Prof Amitava Bose (Orient Blackswan, 2023)

==== Articles published in journals ====
The journal Economic and Political Weekly has made available for its readers an author-specific catalogue of articles starting 1982. See https://www.epw.in/author/mihir-rakshit

==== Lighter essays and commentaries ====
On the Temptations of a Teacher https://ongshumali.com/en/on-the-temptations-of-a-teacher/
