= Pilot Baba =

Indian spiritual guru (1938–2024)

- Born: Kapil Adwait Singh; 15 July 1938; Sasaram, Shahabad district, Bihar Province, British India
- Died: 20 August 2024 (aged 86); Mumbai, Maharashtra, India
- Occupations: Spiritual guru; Writer; IAF pilot
- Website: pilotbaba.org

Wing Commander Kapil Singh (15 July 1938 – 20 August 2024), known as Pilot Baba, was an Indian spiritual guru and former wing commander in the Indian Air Force.

He served as a fighter pilot in the 1965 and 1971 Indo-Pakistani wars before retiring and taking up a public spiritual life. He later became known for demonstrations of prolonged samadhi and for claims of mystical experiences, including encounters with mythological figures. Pilot Baba died in 2024 at the age of 86.

== Early life and education ==
Pilot Baba was born in Sasaram in the present-day Rohtas district of Bihar. He completed his M.Sc. from Banaras Hindu University before joining the Indian Air Force as a pilot. Kapil Singh, as he was then known, was commissioned as a fighter pilot in 1957 and was classified as a Green Pilot during his early service.

== Spiritual journey ==
During the Sino-Indian War in 1962, Singh reported an apparition of [HARIBABA] that guided his plane to a safe landing after he lost all contact with his base. Ten years later, he became a guru under the moniker "Pilot Baba" following his retirement from the IAF. Pilot Baba was known for his claim to enter lengthy samadhi, or death-like bodily states, often under the ground. He also claimed that he could control and manipulate the elements. His samadhi demonstrations, including supposedly being buried underground or kept under water for long periods, led to fame and donations.

=== Ashrams ===
Pilot Baba set up ashrams in India, Nepal and Japan.

Ashrams in India:

- Sasaram
- Haridwar
- Nainital
- Uttarkashi

Ashrams in Nepal is located at:

- Bhaktapur, Ghyampe Danda

== Death ==
Pilot Baba died in Mumbai, Maharashtra on 20 August 2024, at the age of 86.

== Publications ==
Books written by Pilot Baba include:

- Kailash Mansarovar
- Pearls of Wisdom
- Discover Secrets of The Himalaya
- Antaryatra' The Inner Journey (2 volumes)
- Pilgrimage from You to Yourself
- Himalayan kah raha hai (2 volumes)

== Military decorations ==
Pilot Baba received Indian military honours during his service in the Indian Air Force that include the Shaurya Chakra, Vir Chakra, and the Vishisht Seva Medal.
