= 1940 in India =

- Centuries: 18th; 19th; 20th; 21st
- Decades: 1920s; 1930s; 1940s; 1950s; 1960s
- See also: List of years in India; Timeline of Indian history

Events in the year 1940 in India.

== Incumbents ==
- Emperor of India – George VI
- Viceroy of India – Victor Hope, 2nd Marquess of Linlithgow

== Events ==
- National income - ₹35,084 million
- 24 March Lahore Session of AIML where Pakistan Resolution was proposed by Bengal PM Fazlul Haq and duly passed, hence the Jinnah-Muslim League demanded a separate homeland for the Indian Muslims openly for the first time here.
- 8 Aug - Viceroy Lord Linlithgow's August Offer to seek support in war efforts which was rejected by the nationalist.
- Re-entry of Gandhiji in political scene with organisation of individual satyagraha (chose 1500 members) to speak and protest against army entry, against working in ammunition factories etc. to withdraw world war 2 support. First such satyagrahi to be arrested was Vinoba Bhave.
- Arrests by Govt including Netaji and Nehru. Latter was interned for 4 years for instigating peasants of UP.

== Law ==
- 19 November – The Central Legislative Assembly rejects the Finance Bill.
- 21 December – The Finance Bill is certified by the Viceroy.
- Drugs and Cosmetics Act

== Births ==
- 1 January – Asrani, actor.
- 6 January – Narendra Kohli, author (died 2021).
- 10 January - K. J. Yesudas, playback singer.
- 20 January – Krishnam Raju, actor (died 2022).
- 1 February – Ajmer Singh, athlete and educator (died 2010).
- 20 April - Kenneth Powell. Olympic sprinter (died 2022).
- 10 May - Ibrahim Sutar, social worker, poet and folk musician (died 2022).
- 15 June - Elvera Britto, hockey player (died 2022).
- 24 June - Murali Mohan, politician and member of parliament from Rajahmundry.
- 27 July – Bharati Mukherjee, writer (died 2017).
- 28 July – Anil R. Joshi, poet and essayist (died 2025).
- 1 August – Eunice de Souza, poet, literary critic and novelist (died 2017).
- 7 August – Vijay Raghunath Pandharipande, physicist (died 2006).
- 8 August – Dilip Sardesai, cricketer (died 2007).
- 13 August – M. K. Cheriyan, retired college principal.
- 20 August – Rajendra K. Pachauri, economist and environmental scientist. (died 2020).
- 5 September – Siddeshwar Swami, spiritual leader (died 2023).
- 20 October – Yamini Krishnamurthy, classical dancer (died 2024).
- 12 November – Amjad Khan, actor and director (died 1992).
- 7 December – Kumar Shahani, film director and screenwriter (died 2024).
- 12 December – Sharad Pawar, politician, chief minister of Maharashtra.

=== Full date unknown ===
- Sa. Kandasamy, novelist (died 2020).

== Deaths ==
- 20 November – Abul Muhasin Muhammad Sajjad, scholar, freedom fighter and founder of Muslim Independent Party (born 1880).
