= Ramanuja Devanathan =

Indian scholar

- ரா. தெவனாதன்
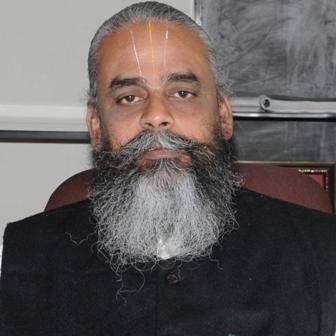
- Devanathan in 2015
- Born: 2 April 1959; Aheendrapuram (Cuddalore District) Tamil Nadu, India
- Died: 7 January 2017 (aged 57); Mumbai, India
- Occupations: Professor, Vice Chancellor, Researcher

Ramanuja Devanathan (2 April 1959 – 7 January 2017) was a renowned Sanskrit scholar from India. He was the head of the Rashtriya Sanskrit Sansthan at Jammu and the former Vice Chancellor of Jagadguru Ramanandacharya Rajasthan Sanskrit University, under Government of Rajasthan. He was the Registrar of Rashtriya Sanskrit Sansthan, New Delhi.

In 2013, Devanathan was the recipient of Maharana of Mewar Charitable Foundation (MMCF)'s 32nd annual award. He was also the editor of 2007 edition of English-Sanskrit Dictionary, originally written by Sir Monier Monier-Williams.

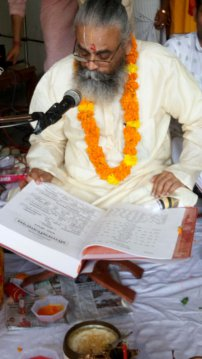
Devanathan reading Ramacharita Manas on Ramnavami at his college in 2016।

Devanathan died on 7 January 2017, in Mumbai while traveling on work.
