= Khalish Dehlavi =

Khalish Dehlavi, who was born Kanwar Krishan Singh Bhayana, is an Indian civil engineer and Urdu-language poet. who designed Sahar International Airport in Mumbai, and the Jawaharlal Nehru Stadium and Indian Election Commission headquarters in New Delhi.

He was born in 1935 in the state of Punjab, India.

He adopted the pen name "Khalish" and is known popularly as "Khalish Dehlavi".
