= Indian Long Range Squadron =

- Active: 1941–1945
- Branch: British Indian Army
- Role: Reconnaissance; Raiding
- Part of: Long Range Desert Group
- Engagements: World War II

The Indian Long Range Squadron or ILRS was a unit of the British Indian Army during World War II. It was formed by asking for volunteers from the 2nd Lancers, 11th Cavalry and the 18th Cavalry all part of the 3rd Indian Motor Brigade. It was originally formed to patrol the borders between the Soviet Union and Persia and Afghanistan. Their first known deployment was in January 1942, involving a very small party, which provided an escort to an Indian Office civil servant, the diplomat Sir Clarmont Skrine. The party traveled by road from Quetta in modern-day Pakistan through the ‘East Persian Corridor’, one of the many Allied supply routes to the Soviet Union through Persia, to take up his post as British consul-general in Mashhad, a large city in north-east Persia near the borders with Afghanistan and modern-day Turkmenistan.

The ILRS was trained by and performed some missions with, but was not a part of, the Long Range Desert Group (LRDG). With the end of the Battle of the Mareth Line on 29 March 1943, the ILRS was released from the LRDG by Field Marshal Montgomery as it was unlikely to find further scope for its activities in the country the Eighth Army was then entering (northern Tunisia).

Returning to India, the ILRS was deployed in May 1944 to Zahedan, a city in Persia located near the tripoint of the borders of Afghanistan, Baluchistan Province of British India and Persia, where it saw the war out patrolling the volatile border to discourage any Soviet infiltration into this oil-rich border region.

On VJ-Day, 2 September 1945 the ILRS was based at Multan (now in Pakistan) and in August 1946 it formed part of Force 401, a brigade strong formation sent to Basra, Iraq (the last Indian Army expeditionary force sent abroad) and the brigade returned to India in June-August 1947.

The end for the ILRS came on 4 August 1947, when the unit was disbanded at their Quetta (now Pakistan) depot by Major Samuel McCoy.

== Formation ==
The ILRS was formed on 25 December 1941, and comprised four patrols: 'J' (Jat), 'P' (Punjabi), 'M' (Muslim) and 'S' (Sikh). In December 1941, when 'J' and 'R' (Rajput) patrols were attached to the LRDG, their designations were changed to 'I1' and 'I2' to avoid confusion with the New Zealand 'R' Patrol. In October 1942, the other two Indian patrols, 'M' and 'S', were also attached to the LRDG and became 'I3' and 'I4' patrols.

The commander of the ILRS was Major Samuel Mcoy MBE, the patrol commanders were:

- 'J' Patrol Lieutenant James Edward Cantlay
- 'P' Patrol Captain Travers John Durrant Birdwood
- 'M' Patrol Captain Alan Browning Rand
- 'S' Patrol Lieutenant Gilbert William Nangle
