= Battle and theatre honours of the Indian Army =

Battle honours awarded to the Indian army

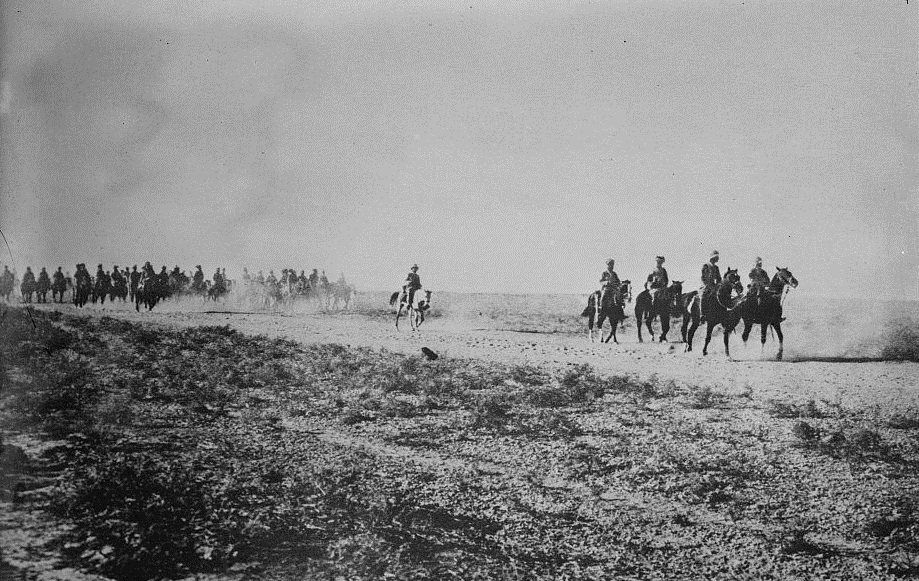
Indian cavalry near the Tigris River, during the First World War

The Indian Army has a distinguished history in which they won many battle and theatre honours. The practice of giving battle honours began with the East India Company who awarded these to the units of the native Indian corps in their presidency armies. The practice continued after the advent of the British Crown post-1857 when the armies of the East India Company became part of the British Indian Army and even after India's independence in 1947. The earliest conflict for which a battle honour was awarded was "Plassey" which was awarded in 1829 to the 1st Regiment, Bengal Native Infantry which served the East India Company in Bengal while the latest is "Kargil" in 1999 awarded to units of independent India's army for feats during the Kargil War.

== Pre-1914 battle honours ==
- Plassey
- Buxar
- Amboor
- Korah
- Guzerat
- Carnatic
- Sholinghur
- Mangalore
- Mysore
- Sedaseer
- Seringapatam
- Egypt
- Allyghur
- Delhi
- Assaye
- Leswarree
- Deig
- Cochin
- Bourbon
- Java
- Kirkee
- Seetabuldee
- Nagpore
- Maheidpoor
- Corygaum
- Nowah
- Persian Gulf
- Beni Boo Alli
- Assam
- Ava
- Kemmendine
- Arracan
- Burmah
- Bhurtpore
- Aden
- Afghanistan
- Ghuznee 1839
- Khelat
- Kahun
- Jellalabad
- Kelat-i-Ghilzie
- Candahar 1842
- Ghuznee 1842
- Cabool 1842
- Cutchee
- China
- Meeanee
- Hyderabad
- Maharajpoor
- Punniar
- Moodkee
- Ferozeshah
- Aliwal
- Sobraon
- Punjaub
- Chillianwalah
- Mooltan
- Goojerat
- Pegu
- Persia
- Reshire
- Bushire
- Koosh-ab
- Delhi 1857
- Lucknow
- Defence of Arrah
- Behar
- Central India
- China 1858–59
- Taku Forts
- Pekin 1860
- China 1860–62
- Abyssinia
- Afghanistan 1878–80
- Ali Masjid
- Peiwar Kotal
- Charasiah
- Kabul 1879
- Ahmed Khel
- Kandahar 1880
- Egypt 1882
- Tel-el-kebir
- Suakin
- Tofrek
- Burma 1885–1887
- Defence of Chitral
- Chitral
- Punjab Frontier
- Malakand
- Samana
- Tirah
- British East Africa
- Pekin 1900
- China 1900
- Somaliland 1901–04

== First World War ==
=== Europe & Gallipoli ===
Europe

- France and Flanders 1914–1918.
- La Bassee, 1914
- Armentieres 1914
- Messines 1914
- Ypres 1914–15
- Gheluvelt
- Festubert, 1914 (also 1914–15)
- Givenchy 1914
- Neuve Chappelle
- Ypres 1915
- St Julien
- Aubers
- Festubert, 1915
- Loos.
- Somme 1916
- Bazentin
- Delville Wood
- Flers-Courcelette
- Morval
- Cambrai 1917

Gallipoli

- Gallipoli 1915
- Helles
- Krithia
- Anzac
- Landing at Anzac
- Defence of Anzac
- Suvla
- Sari Bair
- Landing at Suvla
- Scimitar Hill
- Macedonia 1916–18

=== Egypt, Palestine, Mesopotamia, Arabia ===
Egypt & Palestine

- Damascus
- Egypt 1915–17
- El Mughar
- Gaza
- Jerusalem
- Megiddo
- Nablus
- Nebi Samwil
- Palestine 1917–18
- Sharon
- Suez Canal
- Tell' Asur

Mesopotamia

- Baghdad
- Basra
- Ctesiphon
- Defence of Kut al Amara
- Khan Baghdadi
- Kut al Amara 1915
- Kut al Amara 1917
- Mesopotamia 1914–18
- Shaiba
- Sharqat
- Tigris 1916

Arabia

- Aden

=== Central Asia, Persia, Afghanistan, India, China ===
Central Asia

- Merv

Persia

- Persia 1915–19

Afghanistan

- Afghanistan

India

- NW Frontier, India 1914–17
- Baluchistan 1915–16, 1918

China

- Tsingtao

=== East Africa ===
- East Africa 1914–18
- Kilimanjaro
- Beho Beho
- Narungombe
- Nyangao

== Second World War ==
=== North East Africa, Middle East ===
North East Africa

- Abyssinia 1940–41
- Ad Teclesan
- Agordat
- Amba Alagi
- Barentu
- Berbera
- British Somaliland
- Gallabat
- Keren
- Keren-Asmara Road
- Massawa

Middle East

- Iraq 1941

== Post-independence ==
=== Indo-Pakistani War of 1947 ===
The battle and theatre honours of the 1947 War are:

- Jammu and Kashmir 1947–48 (theatre honour)
- Gurais
- Jhangar
- Kargil
- Naoshera
- Punch
- Rajouri
- Skardu
- Srinagar
- Tithwal
- Uri
- Zoji La

=== Indo-Pakistani War of 1965 ===
The battle and theatre honours of the 1965 War are:

Jammu and Kashmir sector

- Jammu and Kashmir 1965 (theatre honour)
- Hajipir
- Jaurian Kalit
- Kalidhar
- OP Hill
- Raja Picquet-Chand Tekri
- Sanjoi Mirpur

Punjab sector

- Punjab 1965 (theatre honour)
- Assal Uttar
- Burki
- Buttur Dograndi
- Charwa
- Dograi
- Hussainiwala Bridge
- Maharajke
- Phillora
- Tilakpur-Muhadipur

Rajasthan sector

- Rajasthan 1965 (theatre honour)
- Gadra Road

=== Indo-Pakistani War of 1971 ===
East Pakistan Sector

- East Pakistan 1971 (theatre honour)
- Akhaura
- Belonia
- Bhaduria
- Bogra
- Chauddagram
- Darsana
- Ganga Sagar
- Hilli
- Jamalpur
- Khansama
- Kumarkhali
- Madhumati River
- Mian Bazaar
- Mynamati
- Poongli Bridge
- Shamsher Nagar
- Siramani
- Suadih
- Syamganj
- Sylhet

Jammu and Kashmir sector

- Jammu and Kashmir 1971 (theatre honour)
- Banwat
- Brachil Pass and Wali Malik
- Chhamb
- Defence of Punch
- Gutrian
- Laleali-Picquet 707
- Nangi Tekri
- Shingo River Valley
- Thanpir
- Turtok

Punjab theatre

- Punjab 1971 (theatre honour)
- Amritsar Airfield
- Basantar River
- Burj
- Chakri
- Dera Baba Nanak
- Fatehpur
- Harar Kalan
- Jarpal
- Malakpur
- Samba (VA/VP)
- Shehjra

Sindh theatre

- Sindh 1971 (theatre honour)
- Chachro
- Gadra City
- Khinsar
- Longanewala
- Parbat Ali

=== Kargil War, 1999 ===
- Kargil

== See also ==
- Repugnant battle honours of the Indian Army
- Awards and decorations of the Indian Armed Forces

== Footnotes ==
- Singh, Sarbans (1993). Battle Honours of the Indian Army 1757 – 1971. New Delhi: Vision Books. ISBN 81-7094-115-6.
