= 2017 in India =

- Centuries: 19th; 20th; 21st
- Decades: 1990s; 2000s; 2010s; 2020s
- See also: List of years in India; Timeline of Indian history

2017 in India highlights the national/Daily level events during the year.

== Incumbents ==
=== Government of India ===
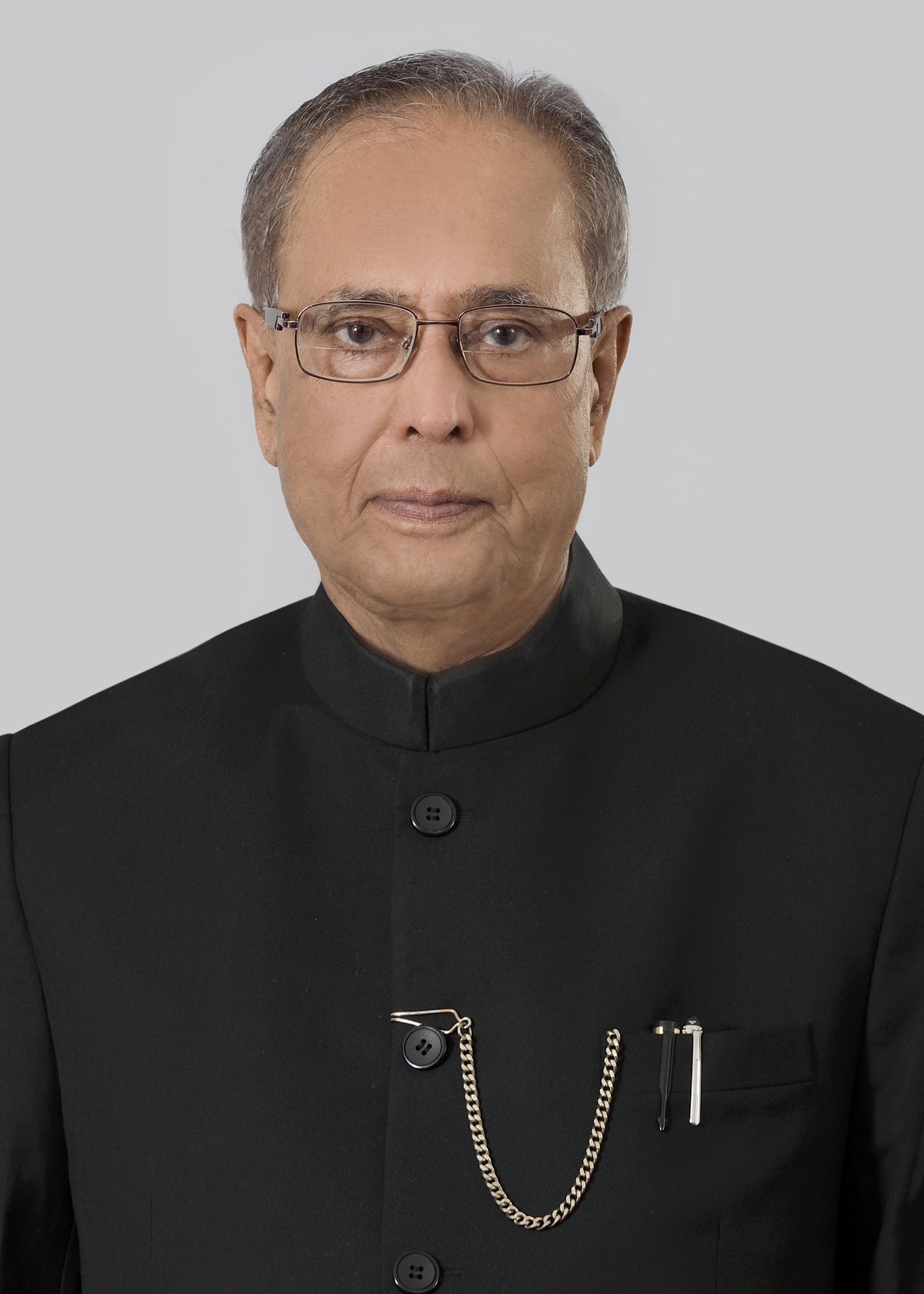
- Dr. Pranab Mukherjee, 13th President of India.
  President of India: Pranab Mukherjee (until July 24), Ram Nath Kovind (since July 25)
- Vice-President of India: Mohammad Hamid Ansari (until August 10), Venkaiah Naidu (since August 11)
- Prime Minister of India: Narendra Modi
- Chief Justice of India: T. S. Thakur (until January 3), Jagdish Singh Khehar (January 5 to August 27), Dipak Misra (since August 28)
- Speaker of the Lok Sabha: Sumitra Mahajan

=== State Governments ===
State	Governor	Chief Minister	Chief Justice
Andhra Pradesh	E. S. L. Narasimhan	N. Chandrababu Naidu	Ramesh Ranganathan (Hyderabad High Court)
Arunachal Pradesh	V. Shanmuganathan (until January 27) Padmanabha Acharya (January 27 to October 3) B. D. Mishra (since October 4)	Pema Khandu	Ajit Singh (Gauhati High Court)
Assam	Banwarilal Purohit (until October 10) Jagdish Mukhi (since October 11)	Sarbananda Sonowal	Ajit Singh (Gauhati High Court)
Bihar	Ram Nath Kovind (until June 20) Keshari Nath Tripathi (June 21 to October 3) Satya Pal Malik (since October 4)	Nitish Kumar	Rajendra Menon (Patna High Court)
Chhattisgarh	Balram Das Tandon	Raman Singh	Deepak Gupta (until February 16) T. B Radhakrishnan (since March 18)
Goa	Mridula Sinha	Manohar Parrikar	Manjula Chellur
Gujarat	Om Prakash Kohli	Vijay Rupani	R. Subhash Reddy
Haryana	Kaptan Singh Solanki	Manohar Lal Khattar	Shiavax Jal Vazifdar
Himachal Pradesh	Acharya Dev Vrat	Jai Ram Thakur	Sanjay Karol (Acting)
Jammu and Kashmir	Narinder Nath Vohra	Mehbooba Mufti	Badar Durrez Ahmed
Jharkhand	Draupadi Murmu	Raghubar Das	Dhirubhai N. Patel (Acting)
Karnataka	Vajubhai Vala	H. D. Kumaraswamy	H. G. Ramesh (Acting)
Kerala	P. Sathasivam	Pinarayi Vijayan	Antony Dominic (Acting)
Madhya Pradesh	Om Prakash Kohli(Additional charge)	Shivraj Singh Chouhan	Hemant Gupta
Maharashtra	C. Vidyasagar Rao	Devendra Fadnavis	Manjula Chellur
Manipur	Najma Heptulla	N. Biren Singh	N. Kotiswar Singh (Acting)
Meghalaya	Ganga Prasad	Mukul Sangma	Dinesh Maheshwari
Mizoram	Nirbhay Sharma	Lal Thanhawla	Ajit Singh
Nagaland	Padmanabha Acharya	T. R. Zeliang	Ajit Singh
Odisha	S. C. Jamir	Naveen Patnaik	Vineet Saran
Punjab	V. P. Singh Badnore	Amarinder Singh	Shiavax Jal Vazifdar
Rajasthan	Kalyan Singh	Vasundhara Raje	Pradeep Nandrajog
Sikkim	Shriniwas Patil	Pawan Kumar Chamling	Satish K. Agnihotri
Tamil Nadu	Banwarilal Purohit	Edappadi K. Palaniswami	Indira Banerjee
Telangana	E. S. L. Narasimhan(Additional charge)	K. Chandrashekar Rao	Ramesh Ranganathan (Acting)
Tripura	Tathagata Roy	Biplap kumar dev	Tinlianthang Vaiphei
Uttar Pradesh	Ram Naik	Yogi Adityanath	Dilip Babasaheb Bhosale
Uttarakhand	Krishan Kant Paul	Trivendra Singh Rawat	K. M. Joseph
West Bengal	Keshari Nath Tripathi	Mamata Banerjee	Jyotirmay Bhattacharya(Acting)

== Elections ==
=== President ===
- Presidential elections were held on 17 July 2017 and results were declared on 20 July. Ram Nath Kovind has been elected the President of India.

=== Vice president ===
- Vice presidential elections were held on 5 August 2017. Venkaiah Naidu has been elected the Vice President of India.

=== Rajya Sabha Elections ===
Rajya Sabha elections were held in India on 21 July and 8 August 2017 to elect ten members of the Rajya Sabha, replacing those who retired in July and August 2017. In addition to scheduled elections, unforeseen vacancies, caused by members' retirement or death, may also be filled via By-elections.

=== State ===
Schedule				Result	
Start date	End date	Election	Jurisdiction	Winning party	Result date
4 February 2017		2017 Punjab Legislative Assembly election	Punjab	Indian National Congress	11 March 2017
4 February 2017		2017 Goa Legislative Assembly election	Goa	Bharatiya Janata Party	11 March 2017
15 February 2017		2017 Uttarakhand Legislative Assembly election	Uttarakhand	Bharatiya Janata Party	11 March 2017
11 February 2017	8 March 2017	2017 Uttar Pradesh Legislative Assembly election	Uttar Pradesh	Bharatiya Janata Party	11 March 2017
4 March 2017	8 March 2017	2017 Manipur Legislative Assembly election	Manipur	Bharatiya Janata Party	11 March 2017
9 November 2017		2017 Himachal Pradesh Legislative Assembly election	Himachal Pradesh	Bharatiya Janata Party	18 December
9 December 2017	14 December 2017	2017 Gujarat Legislative Assembly election	Gujarat	Bharatiya Janata Party	18 December

== Events ==
- National income - ₹170,900,424 million

=== January - March ===
- January 2 - In a landmark 4:3 judgement, the Supreme Court of India held that an appeal for votes during elections on the basis of religion, caste, race, community or language, even that of the electorate, will amount to a ‘corrupt practice’ and call for disqualification of the candidate in any election
- January 2 - Nuclear-capable intercontinental ballistic missile Agni-IV Missile tested successfully off the coast of Odisha.
- January 7 – Heavy snowfall in Kashmir, Himachal Pradesh and Uttarakhand disrupt normal life. Many places record heaviest snowfall in over two decades.
- January 14 – 25 people are dead after a boat capsizes on river Ganga in Patna during Makar Sankranti celebrations.
- January 25 - United Arab Emirates delegation led by Shaikh Mohammad Bin Zayed Al Nahyan, crown prince of Abu Dhabi visited India to sign 14 agreements including strategic partnership, defense industries, transport, cyber security and shipping.
- January 25 - Avalanches hit Jammu and Kashmir. 20 persons including 15 military personnel are found dead.
- January 26 – Republic Day is celebrated across the country. Mohammed bin Zayed Al Nahyan attends the parade in New Delhi as the chief guest.
- January – 2017 pro-Jallikattu protests Hundreds joined and staged protest at Marina beach, Chennai and all over Tamil Nadu in support of conducting Jallikattu.
- February 1 – The annual budget for the union government is presented in the Lok Sabha by finance minister Arun Jaitley. The 92-year-old railway budget is discontinued and merged into the general budget.
- February 6 – One person is dead after a 5.8 magnitude earthquake hit Uttrakhand, North India.
- February 15 – Indian Space Research Organisation launches PSLV-C37, sending104 satellites from seven countries into orbit, the highest ever in the history of space exploration.
- February 17 – South Indian actress Bhavana assaulted by a group of criminals at Kochi allegedly under the instruction of Malayalam cinema actor Dileep.
- 6 March – Indian Navy's oldest serving aircraft carrier, INS Viraat is decommissioned after 30 years of service.
- 7 March – Nine people are injured after a planned low intensity explosion in Bhopal-Ujjain passenger train by ISIS. Uttar Pradesh Anti-Terrorism Squad neutralises one terrorist in Lucknow, 8 suspects arrested from Uttar Pradesh and Madhya Pradesh.
- 11 March – Election results of elections in five states declared by Election Commission.
- 11 March – 12 CRPF personnel killed in Naxal attack in Chhattisgarh.
- 14 March – Manohar Parrikar took oath as the new Chief Minister of Goa.
- 15 March – N. Biren Singh took oath as the new Chief Minister of Manipur.
- 16 March – Amarinder Singh took oath as the new Chief Minister of Punjab.
- 18 March – Yogi Adityanath took oath as the new Chief Minister of Uttar Pradesh.
- 26 March – Lucknow Metro North–south line is expected to be opened.

=== April - June ===
- 1 April – the Gujarat Assembly amended a bill further extending the punishment and fine for Cattle slaughter in India. The punishment was increased to a minimum of 10 years and a maximum of 'life term of a 14 years', and the fine was enhanced to the range of ₹1 lakh – ₹5 lakh.
- 9 April - Kashmir human shield incident
- 4 June - 2017 Unnao rape case.
- 6 June - Uttar Pradesh's Chief Minister Yogi Adityanath directed the state police to take action against cow slaughter and cattle smuggling under the National Security Act and the Gangster Act.
- 9 June – India became full member of Shanghai Cooperation Organisation.
- 16 June – Gorkhaland agitations in Darjeeling, West Bengal.
- 17 June – Kochi Metro inaugurated.
- 19 June – BJP announced Ramanath Kovind as its candidate for the presidential election
- 20 June – Presidential election.
- 23 June – ISRO puts 31 satellites including 29 satellites from others countries through PSLV C-38 successfully.

=== July ===
- 1 July – Goods and Services Tax (India) Act came into force in India. The India's biggest tax reform in 70 years of independence, was launched at midnight of 30 June 2017. It replaced many Indirect taxes.
- 10 July – 7 pilgrims killed, 16 injured during Amarnath Yatra in terror attack in Jammu and Kashmir's Anantnag.
- 11 July – Major landslide occurred in Arunachal Pradesh. 14 people died while many injured
- 12 July – 3 terrorist shot dead in Badgam
- 15 July – 3 terrorist of Jaish e Mohammad shot dead in Tral of Jammu & Kashmir by Indian military.
- 16 July – 16 Amarnath devotees killed in a bus accident in Jammu and Kashmir.
- 17 July – Indian presidential elections were held.
- July – Heavy rain due to Monsoon raised level of most of the rivers causing flood in many states. More than 200 died.
- 17 July – BJP led NDA declared Venkai Naidu as their candidate for vice-presidential election.
- 18 July – Congress protests against Madhur Bhandarkar's film Indu Sarkar based on 1975 emergency in India.
- 20 July – Ram Nath Kovind won the 2017 Indian presidential election with 65.65% votes against Meira Kumar, the presidential candidate of the opposition.
- 25 July – Ram Nath Kovind took oath as 14th President of India.
- 26 July – Nitish Kumar (JDU) resigns as Chief Minister of Bihar, breaking the coalition with RJD & Indian National Congress.
- 27 July – NDA (JDU + BJP) led government comes in Bihar. Nitish Kumar and Sushil Modi took oath as chief minister and vice chief minister of Bihar respectively.
- July – 2017 Gujarat flood resulting in more than 250 deaths.
- July – 2017 West Bengal floods; 70 died.

=== August ===
- 1 August – Lashkar-E-Taiba militant Abu Dujana Shot dead by Indian Army In Jammu and Kashmir
- 4 August – Indian National Congress Vice-President Rahul Gandhi's car attacked by mob in Banaskatha in Gujarat
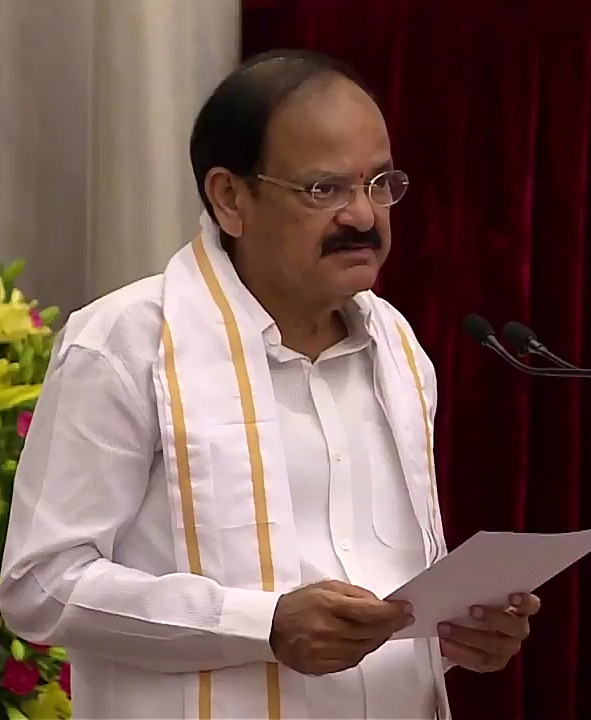
- Venkaiah Naidu was elected as the Vice President of India.
  5 August – Venkaiah Naidu won the Indian vice-presidential election with 67.89% votes against Gopalkrishna Gandhi the opposition candidate.
- 6 August – Bangladeshi terrorist arrested by Uttar Pradesh Police in Muzaffarnagar
- 7 August – Kerala High Court removed lifetime ban on cricketer S. Sreesanth
- 9 August – Maratha Kranti Morcha starts in Mumbai for the demand for reservation for the Maratha community in the state of Maharashtra
- 11 August – Venkaiah Naidu took oath as 13th Vice President of India.
- 13 August – 46 died in a landslide in Mandi district of Himachal Pradesh.
- 15 August – Nation celebrated 70th Independence Day.
- August – August 2017 Nepal and India floods; more than 450 died.
- 19 August – Kalinga Utkal Express from Puri to Haridwar derailed in Muzaffarnagar, Uttar Pradesh. 23 died, more than 100 injured.
- 22 August – Supreme Court bans instant triple talaq calling it unconstitutional. Instructed central government to pass law in parliament for triple talaq.
- 24 August - Reserve Bank of India introduces Rs. 200 bank notes in India to plug the gap in currency system by abiding to Renard series.
- 25 August – Gurmeet Ram Rahim Singh conviction in rape case leads to violence by Dera Sacha Sauda's followers in Punjab, Haryana. 38 died, 300 injured. Army out, curfew clamped in Punjab, Panchkula, Chandigarh.
- 28 August – CBI special court sentenced Gurmeet Ram Rahim Singh 20 years jail in a verdict of a rape case.
- 28 August – Dipak Misra sworn in as 45th chief justice of India.
- 28 August – India China agree to end border stand off in Doklam as both nations withdrew their armies from the disputed region.
- 28 August – Election commission declared by election result of four legislative seats of three states. AAP won Delhi's Bawana, BJP won Goa's Panji and Valpoi, TDP won Nandyal in Andhra Pradesh.
- 29 August – Nagpur–Mumbai Duronto Express derailed near Asangoan in the outskirts of Mumbai; No casualties reported.
- 29 August – Flood in the city of Mumbai. Lifeline came to still. The railway malfunctioned due to heavy rains. Mumbai-Pune Express highway closed.
- 30 August – 290 children have died at BRD Medical College in Gorakhpur due to lack of oxygen.
- 31 August - A three-story building collapsed in Mumbai, 32 died.
- 31 August - Switzerland president Doris Leuthard visited India for a bilateral talk.
- 31 August - ISRO launch of navigation satellite IRNSS 1H failed after heat shield does not detach.

=== September ===
- 1 September – Union Skill Development Minister Rajiv Pratap Rudy and Minister of State for Human Resource Development Mahendra Nath Pandey resigned ahead of a cabinet reshuffle.
- 1 September - Suicide of S. Anitha.
- 3 September -
  - Cabinet expansion conducted in Rashtrapati Bhavan, 9 new ministers took the oath. Nirmala Sitaraman and Mukhtar Abbas Naqvi got promoted to Cabinet Ministers.
  - Nirmala Sitharaman became defense minister of India.
- 5 September -
  - Narendra Modi on visit of China for 9th BRICS Summit and Myanmar for bilateral talk.
  - Lucknow Metro inaugurated.
  - Gauri Lankesh, senior journalist shot dead in Bangalore.
- 7 September – A goods train derailed near Khandala in Maharashtra.
- 11–12 September – Belarus President Alexander Lukashenko visited India for bilateral talk, signed 10 agreement including defense.
- 13–14 September – Japan prime minister Shinzo Abe visited Ahmadabad for bilateral talk, signed many agreement including Bullet Train project in India.
- 29 September – 22 killed, many injured when a stampede occurred on the Lower Parel and Prabhadevi stations in Mumbai

=== October - November ===
- 6 October –
  - FIFA U-17 World Cup kickoff.
  - Air force chopper crashed near Tawang, Arunachal Pradesh during training sortie.7 died.
- 10 October – BJP emerged as largest party in the Gram Panchayat Elections in Maharashtra for the first time followed by Congress.
- 11 October – Australia cricket team bus attacked by mob in Guwahati after the T20I match played between India and Australia. Two Arrested.
- 16 October – 6 Corporaters in Mumbai joined Shivsena leaving Raj's MNS.
- 1 November –
  - Ashish Nehra retired from International Cricket.
  - Shreyas Iyer made his T20I debut against New Zealand at New Delhi
  - 32 died in NTPC boiler explosion. More than 100 injured.
- 4 November – Mohammed Siraj made his T20I Debut against New Zealand at Rajkot
- 9 November – Legislative election will take place in Himachal Pradesh
- 18 November – Manushi Chhillar won the 6th Miss World crown for India in Sanya, China.
- 29 November – Inauguration of Hyderabad Metro.

=== December ===
- 1 December – Uttar Pradesh municipal corporation result declared by state election commission.
- 2 December – Cyclone Ockhi hits Tamil Nadu and Kerala causing many deaths.
- 3 December - A group of Hindutva activists desecerate Baba Budangiri durgah in Karnataka and instigate communal violence.
- 9–14 December – polling for Gujarat legislative assembly election take place.
- 7 December – Earthquake shakes Delhi, Uttar Pradesh, and the North India on a Richter Scale of 5.5.
- 7 December – Mani Shankar Aiyar removed from Congress.
- 10 December – Shreyas Iyer made his ODI debut against Sri Lanka at Dharamsala.
- 11 December – 5 soldiers missing as avalanche hits Gurez sector in Jammu & Kashmir.
- 13 December – Rohit Sharma scored third double century in ODIs against Sri Lanka.
- 13 December – Washington Sundar made his ODI debut against Sri Lanka at Mohali
- 16 December – Rahul Gandhi takes over as Congress president
- 18 December – The Bharatiya Janata Party wins majority of the seats in the recently concluded Gujarat and Himachal Pradesh assembly elections.

=== In the news ===
- Indian Economy is expected to surpass United Kingdom Economy in 2017 according to new International Monitory Fund report due to 20% drop in pound and Brexit. Thus India will become world's sixth strongest economy.
- GSAT-7A military communication, GSAT-9 multi brand communication, GSAT-11 geostationary communications satellites launched by ISRO.
- ISRO launched GSAT-17 and GSAT-19E communications satellites.
- Indian Air Force may get S-400 Triumph Missile System by 2017.
- Disputed detention of Kulbhushan Jadhav in Pakistan.
- Dangal become the first Indian film to gross over 2000 crore rupees in all languages worldwide.
- India China military stand off in Doklam over border dispute.
- India Military operation All Out in Kashmir. 205 militants shot down.
- Manushi Chhillar wins miss world 2017 and becomes the 6th Miss World from India.

== Sports ==
=== International events ===
- 2–8 January – Chennai Open scheduled in Chennai.
- 24–29 January – Syed Modi International Grand Prix Gold scheduled in Lucknow.
- 16–19 February – India Open Squash is scheduled in New Delhi.
- 19–26 February – India participated in 2017 Asian Winter Games.
- 28 March – 2 April – India Super Series was held in New Delhi.
- 18 June - Srikant Kidambi wins 2017 Indonesia Super Series Premier.
- 10–14 May – 2017 Asian Wrestling Championship held in New Delhi, India.
- 25 June - Srikant Kidambi wins 2017 Australian Super Series.
- 6–9 July – 2017 Asian Athletics Championship held in Bhubaneswar.
- 27 August – India beat Nepal by 2–1 in final of 2017 SAFF under −15 championship.
- 6–28 October – FIFA U-17 World Cup is scheduled. England wins the maiden title by beating Spain in final by 5–2.
- 22 October – India beat Malaysia by 2–1 in final of 2017 men's Hockey Asia Cup held in Dhaka, Bangladesh.
- 22 October – Srikant Kidambi wins 2017 Denmark Super Series Premier.
- 29 October - Srikant Kidambi wins 2017 French Super Series Premier
- 5 October – India won 2017 Hockey women's Asia cup held in Japan by beating China in final by 5–4 (1–1).
- 1 November – Indian cricket team registered their first T20I win against New Zealand at New Delhi
- 30 November – Mirabai Chanu wins gold in 2017 world weightlifting championship held in USA.
- 1–10 December – The 2016–17 Men's FIH Hockey World League Final took place in Bhubaneswar, India. India won bronze medal.

=== Domestic leagues ===
League	Duration	Participation	Seasons	Winner/s
Premier Badminton League	1 January – 14 January	6 Clubs	Season 3	Chennai Smashers
Pro Wrestling League	2 January – 19 January	6 Clubs	Season 2	Punjab Royals
I League	7 January – 29 April	10 Clubs	Season 10	Aizawl FC
Hockey India League	21 January – 26 February	6 Clubs	Season 5	Kalinga Lancers
Super Fight League	20 January – 25 February	8 Clubs	Season 1	Sher e Punjab
UBA Pro Basketball League	16 February – 16 March	8 Clubs	Season 4	Mumbai Challengers
Indian Premier League	5 April – 21 May	8 Clubs	Season 10	Mumbai Indians
Federation Cup	7 May – 21 May	8 Clubs	Season 38	Bengaluru FC
Tamil Nadu Premier League	July 22 – August 20, 2017	8 Clubs	Season 2	Chepauk Super Gillies
Karnataka Premier League	September 1–23, 2017	7 Clubs	Season 6	Belagavi Panthers
Pro Kabaddi League	28 July – 28 October	12 Clubs	Season 5	Patna Pirates
Duleep Trophy	3 September- 29 September	3 Clubs	Season 56	India Red
Super Boxing League	7 July – 12 August	8 Clubs	Season 1	Maratha Yodha
Premier Futsal League	15 September –	8 Clubs	Season 2	Mumbai Warriors
Ranji Trophy	October 6, 2017 – January 2, 2018	28 Clubs	Season 84	Vidharbha
Indian Super League	17 November – 4 March	10 clubs	Season 4	Chennayin FC
Premier Badminton League	23 December – 14 January	8 Clubs	Season 4	Hyderabad Hunters

== Publications ==
- “I Do What I Do” by Raghuram Rajan
- “Selection Day” by Aravind Adiga
- “The Ministry of Utmost Happiness” by Arundhati Roy

== Deaths ==
=== January ===
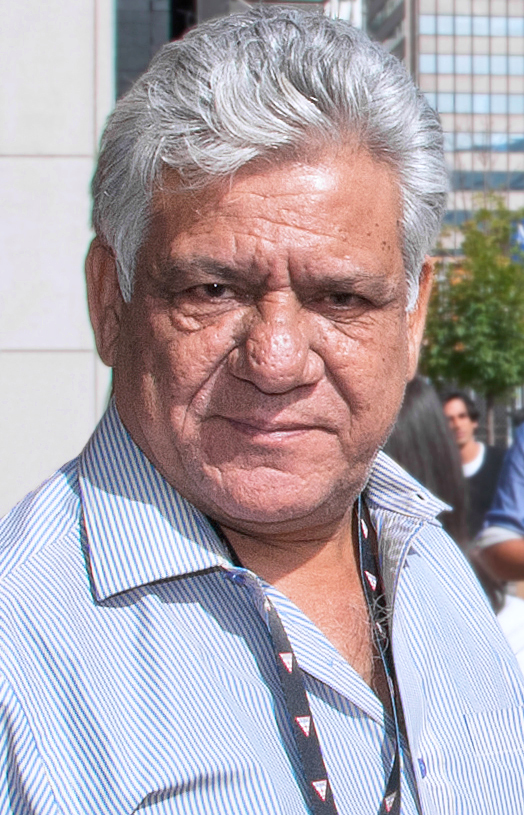
Om Puri

- 1 January – Abis Rizvi, 48, businessman, film producer (born 1968)
- 3 January – H. S. Mahadeva Prasad, 58, MLA, Minister of State in Karnataka (born 1958)
- 4 January – Abdul Halim Jaffer Khan, 89, sitar player (born 1927)
- 5 January – Gangmumei Kamei, 77, politician, former minister in Manipur (born 1939)
- 6 January – Om Puri, 66, actor, (born 1950)
- 7 January – Ramanuja Devanathan, 57, Sanskrit scholar (born 1959)
- 14 January – Surjit Singh Barnala, 91, former Union Minister, former Chief Minister of Punjab, former Governor of several states (born 1925)
- 14 January – C. V. Vishveshwara, 78, scientist, black hole physicist (born 1938)
- 18 January – Zohurul Hoque, 90, Islamic scholar (born 1926)
- 22 January – Naqsh Lyallpuri, 88, ghazal and film lyricist (born 1928)
- 26 January – Ramdas Agarwal, 79, former BJP Rajya Sabha MP from Rajasthan (born 1937)

=== February ===
- 1 February – E. Ahamed, 78, former Minister of State, MP from Kerala (born 1938)
- 1 February – Asim Basu, 81, theatre artiste, film art director (born 1935)
- 13 February – Salma Siddiqui, 85, novelist in Urdu (born 1931)
- 16 February – Krishnaraj Sriram, 43, first-class cricketer for Karnataka (born 1973)
- 17 February – Ved Prakash Sharma, 61, writer of novels and screenplays in Hindi (born 1955)
- 18 February – Jambuwantrao Dhote, 77, former MP and MLA from Maharashtra (born 1939)
- 20 February – Antony Mitradas, 103, film director in Tamil, Malayalam and Sinhalese (born 1913)
- 26 February – Mushi Santappa, 93, polymer chemist, leather technologist, former vice chancellor of Sri Venkateswara University and the University of Madras (born 1923)
- 28 February – Haji Abdul Salam, 68, Rajya Sabha MP from Manipur (born 1948)

=== March ===
- 1 March – Raajesh Johri, 64, poet, lyricist, ad film maker (born 1952)
- 1 March – Shiv K. Kumar, 95, English poet, playwright, novelist, short story writer (born 1921)
- 1 March – Taarak Mehta, 87, columnist, humorist, writer, playwright (born 1929)
- 6 March – Joachim Baxla, 66, four time MP from Alipurduars constituency, West Bengal (born 1955)
- 6 March – Rabi Ray, 90, former Union Minister and speaker of the Lok Sabha (born 1926)
- 7 March – Kalika Prasad Bhattacharya, 47, folk singer and researcher from Assam (born 1970)
- 11 March – Cheyyar Ravi, 54, film and television director (born 1962)

=== April ===
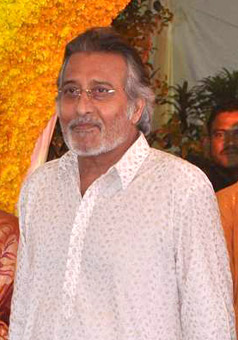
Vinod Khanna

- 14 April – Girish Chandra Saxena, 89, politician. (born 1928)
- 27 April – Vinod Khanna, 70, actor, former Minister of State (born 1946), Bladder Cancer.
- 29 April – Sonika Chauhan, 28, model, television actress.

=== May ===
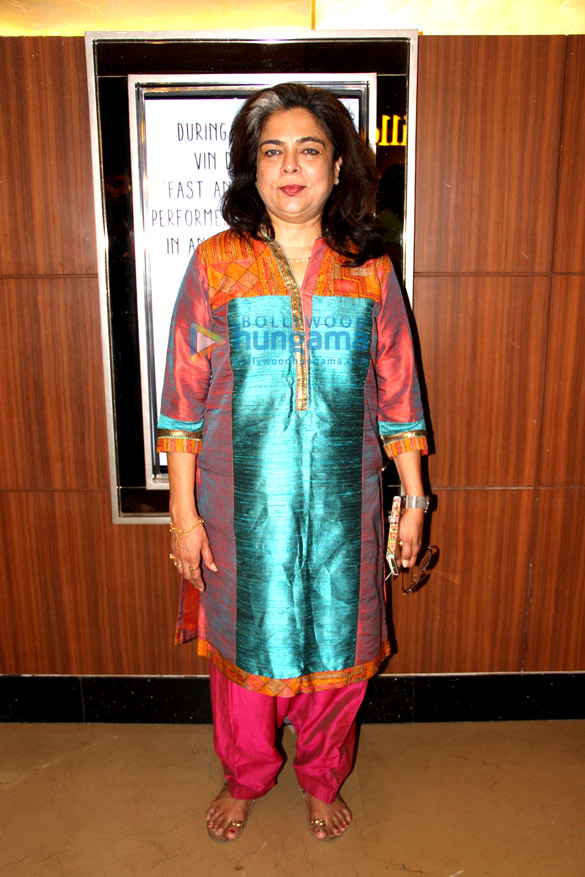
Reema Lagoo

- 11 May – Gabriel Chiramel, 103, priest, zoologist and author
- 17 May – Rima Lagoo, 59, actress (cardiac arrest)
- 18 May – Anil Dave, 60, cabinet minister, environmentalist (lung cancer)
- 26 May – K P S Gill, 82, IPS officer.

=== June ===
- 2 June 2017 – C. Narayana Reddy, writer and composer.

=== July ===
- 2 July – Madhukar Toradmal, 84, Marathi actor, professor, writer, play-translator
- 11 July – Mangesh Tendulkar, 83, Indian artist, cartoonist, humorist.
- 24 July – Yash Pal Singh, 90, scientist, educationist.
- 24 July – U R Rao, 84, space scientist.
- 28 July – Inder Kumar, 43, actor.
- 30 July – H. Sayeeduddin Dagar, 78, Indian Classical Vocalist.

=== August ===
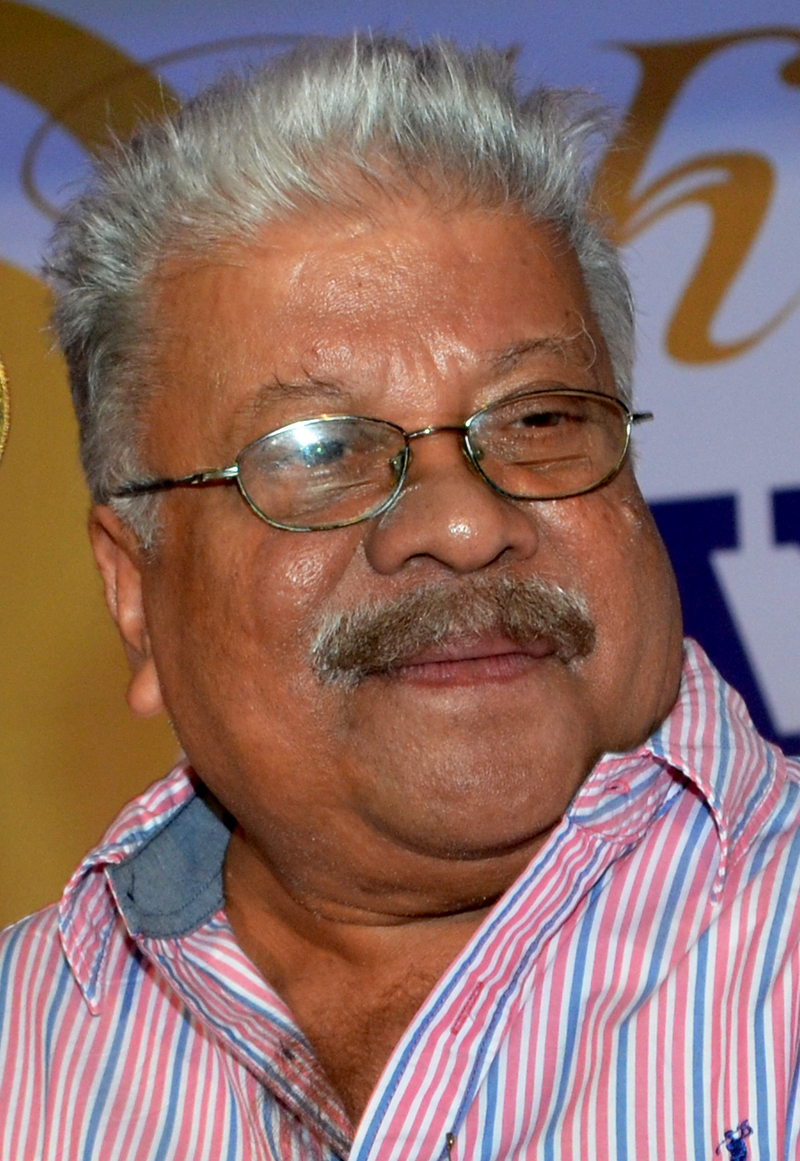
Punathil Kunjabdulla

- 1 August – Pushpa Mittra Bhargava, 89, scientist, administrator
- 2 August – Santosh Mohan Dev, 83, politician, former minister in UPA government.
- 9 August – Sanwar Lal Jat, 62, Member of Parliament from Ajmer, Rajasthan
- 14 August – Bhakti Yadav, 91, gynaecologist, Padma Shri recipient.

=== September ===
- 2 September – Shirish Pai, 88, social worker and poet, daughter of Pralhad Keshav Atre.
- 5 September – Gauri Lankesh, 55, journalist, homicide
- 16 September – Arjan Singh, 98, Air Force marshal
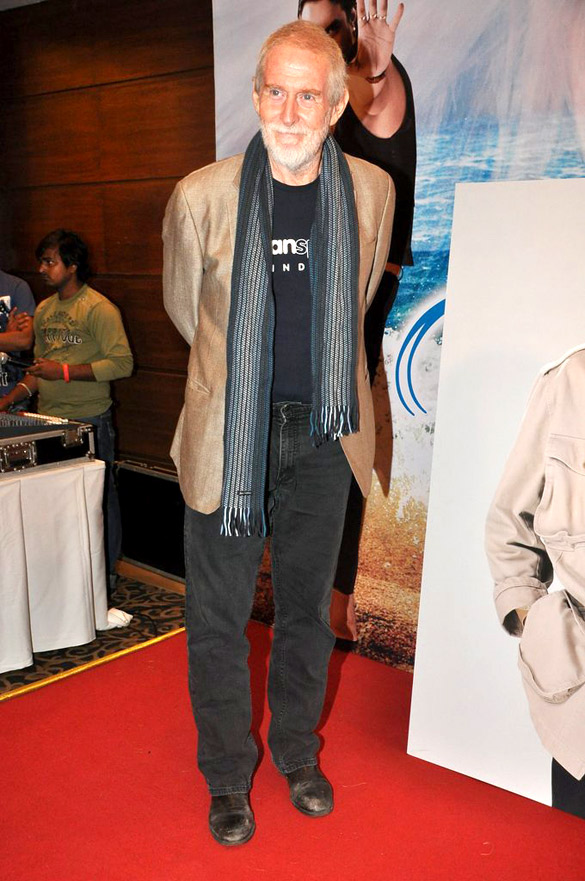
- Tom Alter
  29 September – Tom Alter, 67, Indo-American actor, Padma Shri Award winner.

=== October ===
- 7 October – Kundan Shah, 69, Indian film director.
- 24 October – Girija Devi, 68, classical singer.
- 27 October – Punathil Kunjabdulla, 77, Malayalam-language author (born 1940)
- 30 October – M. V. Sridhar, 51, cricketer

=== November ===
- 14 November – Shyama, 82, actress.
- 20 November – P R Dasmunsi, politician, former AIFF president.

=== December ===
- 4 December – Shashi Kapoor, 79, Indian actor.

== See also ==
List of Bollywood films of 2017

2017 in Indian Football
