= 2020 in India =

- Centuries: 19th; 20th; 21st
- Decades: 2000s; 2010s; 2020s
- See also: List of years in India; Timeline of Indian history

Events in the year 2020 in India.

== Incumbents ==
=== Government of India ===
Photo	Post	Name
	President of India	Ram Nath Kovind
	Vice-President of India Chairman of Rajya Sabha	Venkaiah Naidu
	Prime Minister of India	Narendra Modi
	Chief Justice of India	Sharad Arvind Bobde
	Speaker of the Lok Sabha	Om Birla
	Chief Election Commissioner of India	Sunil Arora
	Chief of Defence Staff	Bipin Rawat
	Lok Sabha	17th Lok Sabha

=== State Governments ===
State	Governor	Chief Minister	Party	Chief Justice
Andhra Pradesh	Biswabhusan Harichandan	Y.S. Jagan Mohan Reddy	YSRCP	C. Praveen Kumar (Acting)
Arunachal Pradesh	B. D. Mishra	Pema Khandu	BJP	Ajit Singh (Gauhati High Court)
Assam	Jagdish Mukhi	Sarbananda Sonowal	BJP	Ajit Singh (Gauhati High Court)
Bihar	Phagu Chauhan	Nitish Kumar	JD(U)	Rajendra Menon (Patna High Court)
Chhattisgarh	Anusuiya Uikey	Bhupesh Baghel	INC	T. B Radhakrishnan
Goa	Mridula Sinha	Pramod Sawant	BJP	Manjula Chellur
Gujarat	Acharya Devvrat	Vijay Rupani	BJP	R. Subhash Reddy
Haryana	Kaptan Singh Solanki	Manohar Lal Khattar	BJP	Ravi Shankar Jha
Himachal Pradesh	Acharya Dev Vrat	Jai Ram Thakur	BJP	Sanjay Karol (Acting)
Jammu and Kashmir	Manoj Sinha	President's rule		Badar Durrez Ahmed
Jharkhand	Draupadi Murmu	Hemant Soren	JMM	Dhirubhai N. Patel (Acting)
Karnataka	Vajubhai Vala	B.S. Yediyurappa	BJP	H. G. Ramesh (Acting)
Kerala	Arif Mohammad Khan	Pinarayi Vijayan	CPI(M)	Antony Dominic (Acting)
Madhya Pradesh	Lalji Tandon	Shivraj Singh Chouhan	BJP	Hemant Gupta
Maharashtra	Bhagat Singh Koshyari	Uddhav Thackeray	Shivsena	Dipankar Datta
Manipur	Najma Heptulla	N. Biren Singh	BJP	N. Kotiswar Singh (Acting)
Meghalaya	Ganga Prasad	Conrad Sangma	NPP	Biswanath Somadder
Mizoram	Nirbhay Sharma	Zoramthanga	MNF	Ajit Singh
Nagaland	Padmanabha Acharya	Neiphiu Rio	NDPP	Ajit Singh
Odisha	Ganeshi Lal	Naveen Patnaik	BJD	Vineet Saran
Punjab	V. P. Singh Badnore	Amarinder Singh	INC	Ravi Shankar Jha
Rajasthan	Kalyan Singh	Ashok Gehlot	INC	Pradeep Nandrajog
Sikkim	Shriniwas Patil	Prem Singh Tamang	SKM	Satish K. Agnihotri
Tamil Nadu	Banwarilal Purohit	Edappadi K. Palaniswami	AIADMK	Indira Banerjee
Telangana	Tamilisai Soundararajan (Additional charge)	K. Chandrashekar Rao	BRS	T. B Radhakrishnan (Telangana High Court)
Tripura	Tathagata Roy	Biplab Kumar Deb	BJP	Tinlianthang Vaiphei
Uttar Pradesh	Anandiben Patel	Yogi Adityanath	BJP	Dilip Babasaheb Bhosale
Uttarakhand	Krishan Kant Paul	Pushkar Singh Dhami	BJP	Ramesh Ranganathan
West Bengal	Jagdeep Dhankhar	Mamata Banerjee	AITC	Thottathil B. Radhakrishnan

== Events ==
- National income - ₹197,456,704 million
- 5 January – 2020 Jawaharlal Nehru University attack
- 11 January
- – Bombay High Court stayed a Sessions Court order by Sessions Judge Dinesh Eknath Kothalikar made on Nov 2019 which restored criminal case against Adani Enterprises, its chairman Gautam Adani and managing director Rajesh Adani for carrying out share rigging in connivance with Ketan Parekh in 1999 - 2001 period.
- - Jammu and Kashmir Police officer Davinder Singh arrested by National Investigation Agency for links with terrorists.
- 25 January - The 104th Constitutional Amendment which extends reservation for Scheduled Castes and Scheduled Tribes in Loksabha and Legislative assemblies came into effect. The amendment ends Anglo-Indian reserved seats in the Lok Sabha.
- 27 January – Agreement signed between the Government of India, the Assam Government and the Bodo groups to redraw and rename the Bodoland Territorial Area District (BTAD) in Assam.
- 30 January – The COVID-19 pandemic was confirmed to have spread to India on 30 January 2020 from China. The 1st case of COVID-19 was spotted in Kerala, India.
- 8 February – Polling for the Delhi Legislative Assembly elections was held.
- 11 February – 2020 Delhi Legislative Assembly election's results announced with Aam Aadmi Party securing 62 of 70 seats to claim an absolute majority in the elections.
- 23 – 29 February – At least 53 people were killed in communal riots in parts of Delhi.
- 24 – 25 February – U.S. President Donald Trump visited India for a two-day state visit, addressed a "Namaste (Welcome) Trump" event with Prime Minister Narendra Modi in Ahmedabad. Toured Mahatma Gandhi's Sabarmati Ashram and the Taj Mahal at Agra. Received a formal welcome from President Ram Nath Kovind at the Rashtrapati Bhavan Presidential Palace in New Delhi. Conducted a series of meetings with Prime minister Modi and other government officials, as well as Indian business executives.
- 20 March –
  - Kamal Nath resigned from the post of the Chief Minister of Madhya Pradesh, after a political crisis.
  - The four convicts of the 2012 Delhi gang rape and murder case were executed in Tihar Jail, Delhi.
- 22 March – Janata Curfew: India observed a 14-hour lockdown to prevent the spread of the COVID-19 pandemic.
- 23 March –
  - Shivraj Singh Chouhan took oath as the Chief Minister Of Madhya Pradesh
  - Maoist attack in Sukma kills 17 paramilitary personnel.
- 24 March – COVID-19 lockdown in India : Prime Minister, Narendra Modi announced a 21-day lockdown throughout India from midnight of 25 March to 14 April to prevent the spread of the COVID-19 pandemic.
- 31 March – Sudden spike in COVID-19 cases, with hundreds of cases linked with people who attended Tablighi Jamaat event in Delhi.
  - India remained under an extended lockdown throughout the month of April, to check the spread of the COVID-19 pandemic in the country.
  - Thousands of inter-state migrant workers were rendered jobless and penniless, causing them to walk thousands of kilometres from state to state due to lack of availability of transport because of the lockdown. Hundreds of people died due to exhaustion and hunger.
- 4 April –
  - An FIR was registered against an unknown person in Gujarat for placing an online advertisement to "sell" the Statue of Unity for ₹30,000 crore.
  - The last speaker of Akacari, a woman called Licho, dies in Shadipur, Port Blair, making the language extinct.
- 16 April – 2020 Palghar mob lynching.
- 18 April – Seven IITs have announced plans to boycott the Times Higher Education World University Rankings this year ostensibly because they are not convinced "about the parameters and transparency" of the ranking agency's process, according to a joint statement issued by the directors of the IITs at Mumbai, Delhi, Guwahati, Kanpur, Kharagpur, Madras (Chennai) and Roorkee.
- 5 May – Skirmishes began between India and China. Several Indian and Chinese soldiers are injured in a cross-border clash at the Nathu La crossing. About one hundred and fifty soldiers were involved in the face-off which included fistfights and stone-throwing.
- 6 May – Wanted terrorist Riyaz Naikoo of the terror group Hizb-ul-Mujahideen, killed in a gun battle with Indian security forces.
- 7 May – 13 people were killed from a gas leak at a chemical plant in Visakhapatnam, Andhra Pradesh.
- 8 May - 16 migrant laborers who were returning to their villages by foot due to COVID-19 lockdown in India killed by a goods train near Karmad in Aurangabad district, Maharashtra.
- 12 May - Prime Minister, Narendra Modi announces the Atmanirbhar Bharat Abhiyan in response to the COVID-19 pandemic.
- 20 May – Cyclone Amphan hit the eastern part of India and lead to flood like situation in many South-eastern states.
- 27 May –
  - A petroleum gas and oil leak occurred in Indian Oil's Baghjan Oilfield, in Assam.
  - A pregnant elephant died after eating a pineapple filled with firecrackers, in Palakkad, Kerala.
- 2–4 June – Cyclone Nisarga hit the western coast of India, causing damage in the state of Maharashtra.
- 5 June- The President of India promulgates three ordinances related to agriculture, which would be later proposed as a bill and consequently passed as an act.
- 14 June - Bollywood Star Sushant Singh Rajput found dead at his Bandra Residence in Mumbai.
- 15–16 June – 20 personnel of the Indian army including a commanding officer, are killed in action in the ongoing Skirmishes between India and China at LAC in the Galwan Valley of Ladakh.
- 17 June – India wins a two-year seat on the United Nations Security Council to begin 1 January 2021 during the 2020 Security Council Elections.
- 19 June–23 June – Death of P. Jayaraj and J. Bennix.
- 25 June – Indian Railways suspends all passenger train service (except Rajdhani and Migrant Special Trains) until 12 August 2020.
- 29 June – Indian Government bans 59 Chinese apps including TikTok, CamScanner, SHAREit and UC Browser due to the ongoing Sino-Indian Border tensions.
- 3 July – 8 Policemen of the Uttar Pradesh police are martyred in an encounter with the gang of the wanted criminal Vikas Dubey in Kanpur, Uttar Pradesh state.
- 3 July – Prime Minister, Narendra Modi makes a visit to Nimu Post near the Indo-China border in Ladakh along with Army Chief Manoj Mukund Naravane and CDS Bipin Rawat amid ongoing India-China border tensions.
- 5 July – CRPF convoy is attacked by terrorist which results in martyr of 1 CRPF soldier in Pulwama, Jammu and Kashmir.
- 5 July – Earthquake of magnitude 4.7 on Richter scale hits Kargill in Ladakh.
- 10 July – Wanted Criminal Vikas Dubey encountered.
- 17 July – Number of confirmed cases of COVID-19 reach 1 million.
- 18 July – 2020 Amshipora murders. Indian military personnel were responsible for the killing of three Kashmiri laborers, after claiming they were terrorists.
- 21 July – ongoing – Floods in Brahmaputra River in the state of Assam.
- 29 July – National Education Policy 2020 (NEP 2020), a new policy on education in India approved by the Union Cabinet.
- 29 July – 2020 Punjab alcohol poisoning. At least 121 people died after drinking toxic, illegally-made alcohol in Punjab.
- 5 August – Prime Minister, Narendra Modi performed Bhoomi Pujan and laid the foundation stone of the Ram Temple at Ayodhya.
- 7 August –
  - Air India Express Flight 1344 Crashed after overrunning the Runway at Calicut International Airport, Kerala. At least 19 people killed, including two pilots and 17 Passengers.
  - Heavy Landslide in Munnar, Idukki District, Kerala: 24 killed, 40 trapped; NDRF teams carry out rescue ops
- 9 August –
  - Fire at a COVID-19 facility in the city of Vijayawada, Andhra Pradesh, killed 11 people and left 22 injured.
  - Indian Farmers' Protest was started against three farm acts.
- 11 August –
  - Union Minister for Road Transport and Highways and Micro, Small and Medium Enterprises Nitin Gadkari, has unveiled a microwave device that can disinfect premises in just 30 seconds named 'Atulya'.
  - 3 killed and many arrested following the riots in Bangalore over a controversial Facebook post on Islam's prophet Muhammad by a nephew of Congress politician.
- 15 August – MS Dhoni announced his retirement from international cricket.
- 20 August – A major fire broke out in an underground hydroelectric power plant in Srisailam in the state of Telangana killing 9 people.
- 31 August - National Statistical Office releases data for the first quarter of Financial Year 2020–2021, with GDP in the given period contracting by 23.9% due to the COVID-19 pandemic lockdown in India.
- 3 September – 118 Chinese apps including PUBG Video Game app banned.
- 8 September - Narendra Modi inaugurates Rajasthan Patrika sponsored Patrika Gate circular park in Jaipur. Patrika Gate is the largest circular park on a traffic signal in Asia.
- 11 September – Retired Navy officer Madan Sharma beaten up for forwarding cartoon on Uddhav Thackeray; four arrested.
- 14 September –
  - Three Bills on agriculture reforms introduced in the Parliament to replace the ordinances issued during the lockdown on June 5.
  - 2020 Hathras gang rape and murder.
- 30 September - The court acquitted all the 32 accused of the Demolition of the Babri Masjid including L. K. Advani, Murli Manohar Joshi, Uma Bharti, Vinay Katiyar and several others in the case on account of inconclusive evidence. The special court judge said ""The demolition was not pre-planned."
- 5 Oct - Kerala based journalist Sidhique Kappan and three others arrested and jailed under Unlawful Activities (Prevention) Act by Uttar Pradesh Police on their way to Hathras.
- 10 Oct – Goa declared first 'Har Ghar Jal' State by the Jal Shakti Ministry.
- 14 Oct - Tata Group's Tanishq brand pulled down its advertisement that was released a week ago following social media uproar that alleged glorification of Love jihad.
- 28 Oct - First phase of polling for the Bihar Legislative Assembly election was held.
- 31 Oct – Uttar Pradesh Chief Minister, Yogi Adityanath announced that a law to curb 'Love Jihad' would be passed by his government.
- 3 Nov - Second phase of polling for the Bihar Legislative Assembly election was held.
- 7 Nov - Third phase of polling for the Bihar Legislative Assembly election was held.
- 10 Nov - 2020 Bihar Legislative Assembly election results announced with the National Democratic Alliance winning 125 out of 243 seats to secure simple majority in the elections.
- 24 Nov - The Uttar Pradesh state cabinet cleared the ordinance of the Uttar Pradesh Prohibition of Unlawful Religious Conversion Ordinance on 24 November 2020 following which it was approved and signed by state Governor Anandiben Patel on 28 November 2020.
- 27 Nov - A Mikoyan MiG-29K jet that took off from INS Vikramaditya crashed in Arabian Sea near Goa.
- 5 December - An idiopathic disease broke out in Eluru, Andhra Pradesh. On 20 December, AIIMS and NEERI Research Institute came to a conclusion that pesticides leaching into the water supply is the most likely reason.
- December - Madhya Pradesh government approved an anti conversion bill similar to the Uttar Pradesh one.
- 30 December -
  - The Assam government passed a law converting its 700 state-run Islamic schools into regular schools.
  - India's first metallic Monolith appears in Symphony Forest Park, Ahmedabad. The monolith was installed by the private company that is managing the park.
- Date unknown
  - Amandeep Drall, Indian golfer wins the fourth leg of the 2020 Hero Women's Pro Golf Tour

== Deaths ==
=== January ===
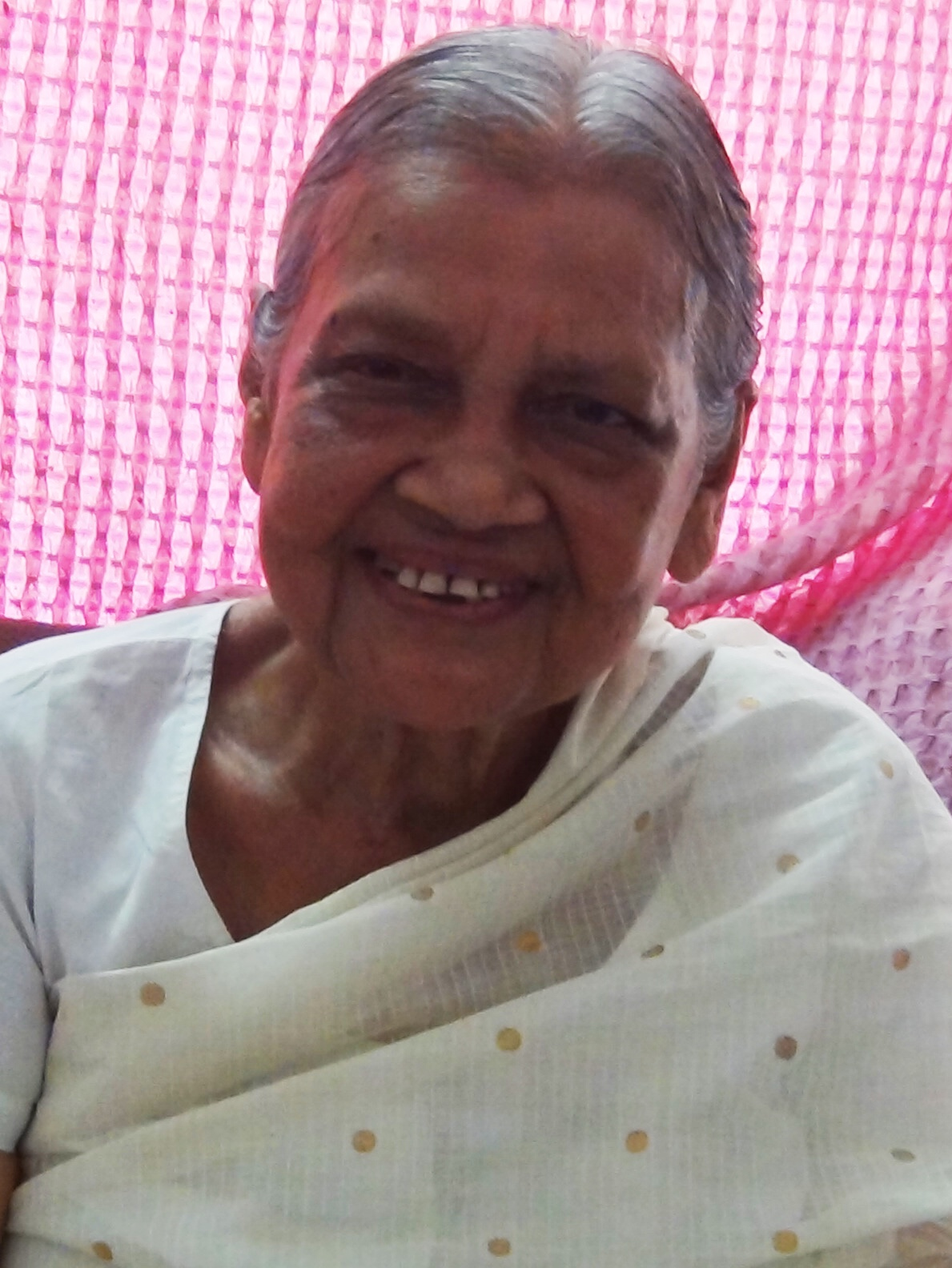
Sunanda Patnaik

- 2 January
  - Daitari Behera, politician (b. 1938).
  - D. P. Tripathi, politician (b. 1954).
- 3 January
  - M. Sakthivel Murugan, politician.
  - Rameshwar Prasad, politician (b. c. 1930s).
- 19 January
  - Sunanda Patnaik, Gwalior gharana classical singer (b. 1934).
  - Sher Bahadur Singh, 87, politician.
  - Man Sood, cricketer (b. 1939).
- 26 January – Maharaj Kishan Bhan, virologist and paediatrician (b. 1947).
- 30 January – Vidya Bal, Marathi writer (b. 1939)

=== February ===
- 9 February – P. Parameswaran, Politician and philosopher. (b. 1927).
- 13 February – Rajendra K. Pachauri, Scientist and Civil servant. (b. 1940).
- 18 February – Tapas Paul, Actor and Politician. (b. 1958).
- 22 February – Krishna Bose, Politician, Educator and Social Worker. (b. 1930)
- 28 February – Baidyanath Prasad Mahto, 72, Politician (b. 1947)

=== March ===
- 2 March – Virendra Singh Sirohi, 73, politician (b. 1946)
- 8 March – H. R. Bhardwaj, politician (b. 1937)
- 20 March – P. K. Banerjee, football player
- 22 March – Visu, 74, Indian film director, writer and actor (b. 1945).
- 25 March – Nimmi, 88, actress
- 27 March – Beni Prasad Verma, 79, politician (b. 1941)

=== April ===
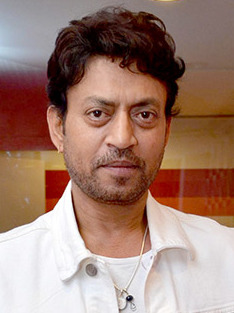
Irrfan Khan

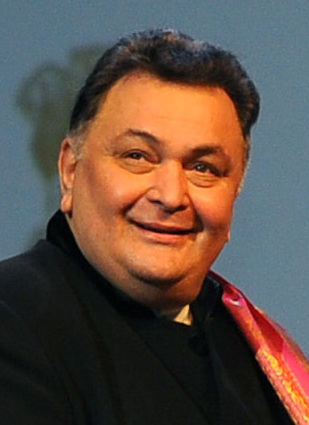
Rishi Kapoor

- 6 April
  - M. K. Arjunan, composer (b. 1936)
  - Bullet Prakash, actor (b. 1976)
- 29 April – Irrfan Khan, actor (b. 1967)
- 30 April – Rishi Kapoor, actor (b. 1952)
- 30 April – Chuni Goswami, footballer (b. 1938)

=== May ===
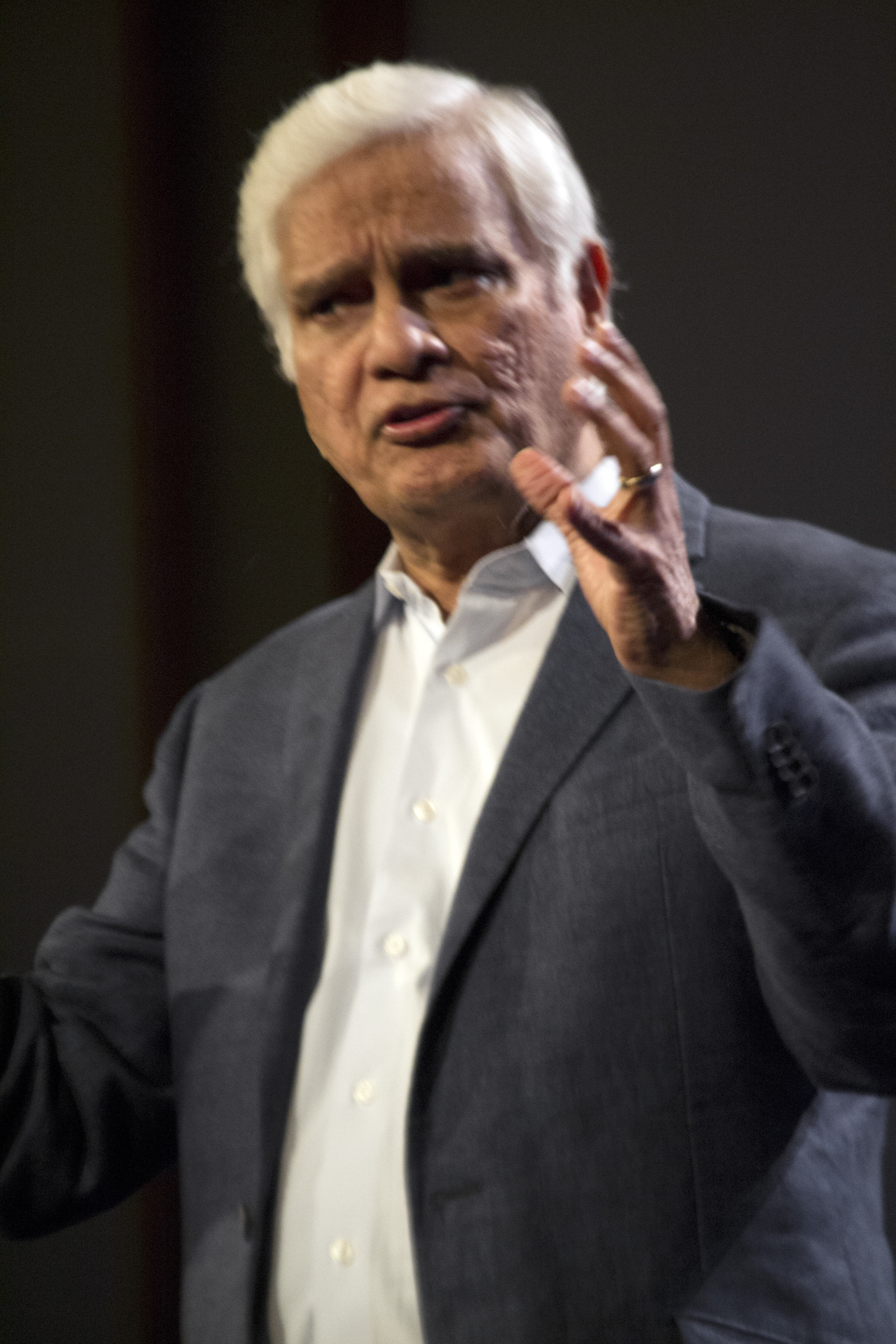
Ravi Zacharias

- 1 May – Mathew Anikuzhikattil, 77, Indian Syro-Malabar Catholic hierarch (b. 1942)
- 3 May – K. S. Nissar Ahmed, 84, Indian writer and poet (b. 1936)
- 6 May – Riyaz Naikoo, 35, Wanted terrorist killed in Army clash (b. 1985)
- 15 May – Shri Krishna Joshi, 84, Indian physicist (b. 1935)
- 17 May – Ratnakar Matkari, Marathi Play writer (b. 1938)
- 19 May
  - Ravi Zacharias, Indian-born Canadian-American Christian apologist (b. 1946)
  - Saeed Ahmad Palanpuri, Principal Darul Uloom Deoband
- 25 May – Balbir Singh Sr., 96, Hockey player (b. 1923)
- 27 May – Mujtaba Hussain, writer
- 28 May – M. P. Veerendra Kumar, 83, Politician (b. 1936)
- 29 May
  - Ajit Jogi, Politician (b. 1946)
  - Bhanwar Lal Sharma (politician), Politician
  - Bejan Daruwalla, Astrologer (b. 1931)
  - Yogesh, lyricist, writer (b. 1943)
- 31 May – Wajid Khan, musician

=== June ===
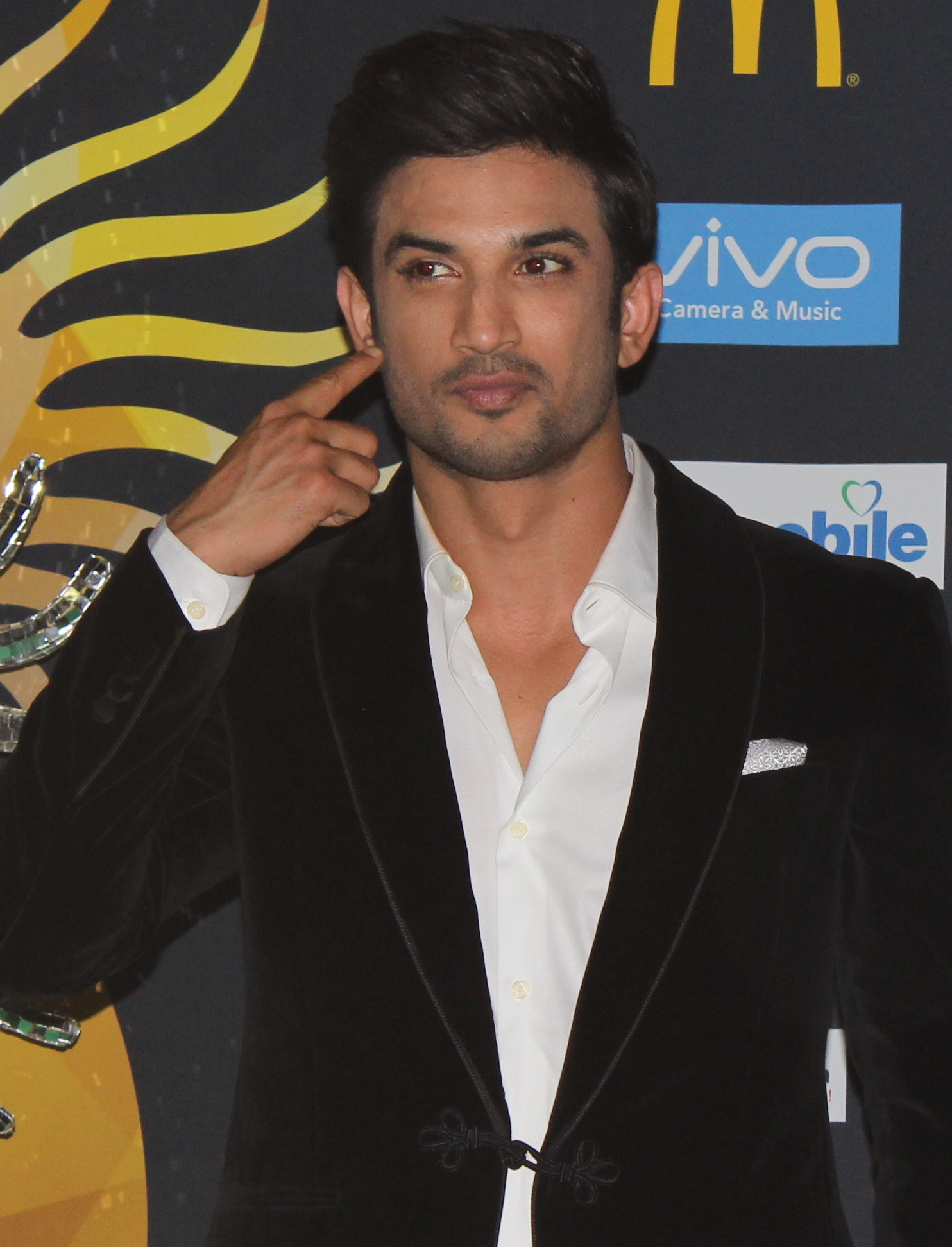
Sushant Singh Rajput

- 4 June – Basu Chatterjee, Filmmaker (b. 1930)
- 5 June – Ved Marwah, Civil Servant (b. 1934)
- 7 June – Chiranjeevi Sarja, 35, Film actor (b. 1984)
- 12 June – Parasnath Yadav, 71, Politician (b. 1949)
- 13 June – Vasant Raiji, 100, Cricketer (b. 1920)
- 14 June – Sushant Singh Rajput, 34, Film and television actor (b. 1986)
- 15 June – Col. Santosh Babu, 38, Indian Army Soldier martyred in 2020 China–India skirmishes near Ladakh (b. 1982)
- 16 June – Haribhau Jawale, Politician (b. 1953)
- 18 June – K.R. Sachidanandan, 48, Indian screenwriter, director, and film producer (b. 1972)
- 21 June – Rajinder Goel, 77, Cricketer (b. 1942)

=== July ===
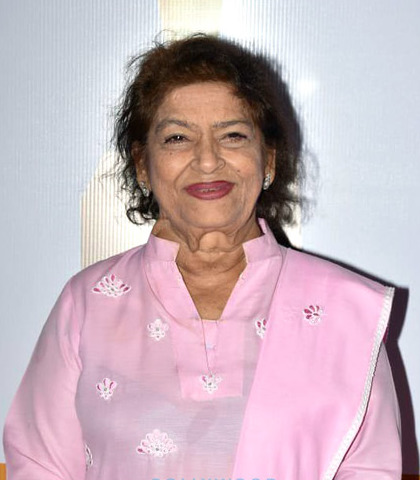
Saroj Khan

- 3 July – Saroj Khan, 71, Dance Choreographer (b. 1948)
- 8 July – Jagdeep, 81, Film Actor (b. 1939)
- 10 July – Vikas Dubey, 56, Gangster (b. 1964)
- 11 July – Jyotsna Bhatt, 79–80, Ceramist (b. 1940)
- 13 July – Debendra Nath Roy, 61, Politician (b. 1955)
- 16 July – Neela Satyanarayanan, 71, Civil servant (b. 1949)

=== August ===
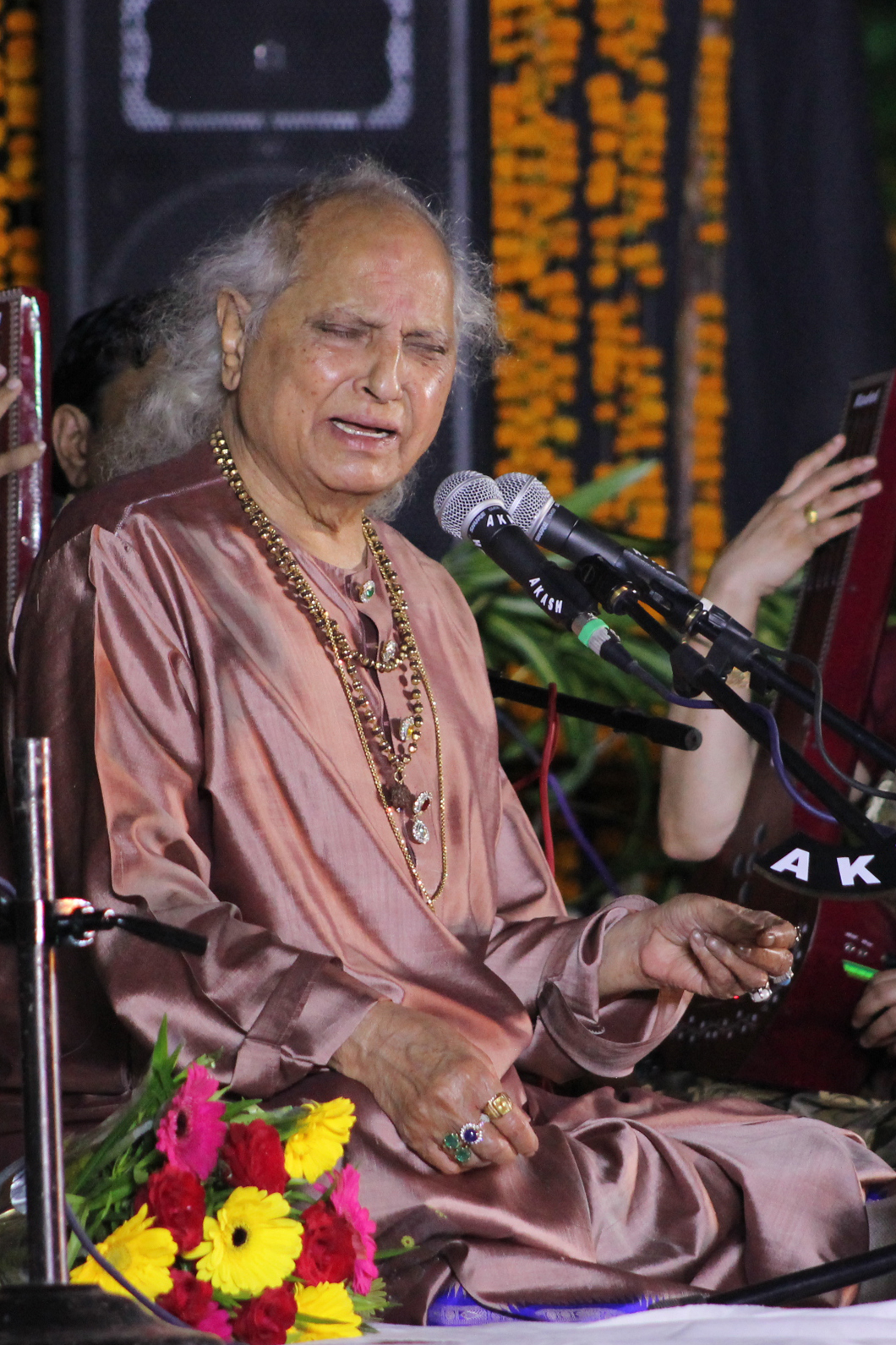
Jasraj

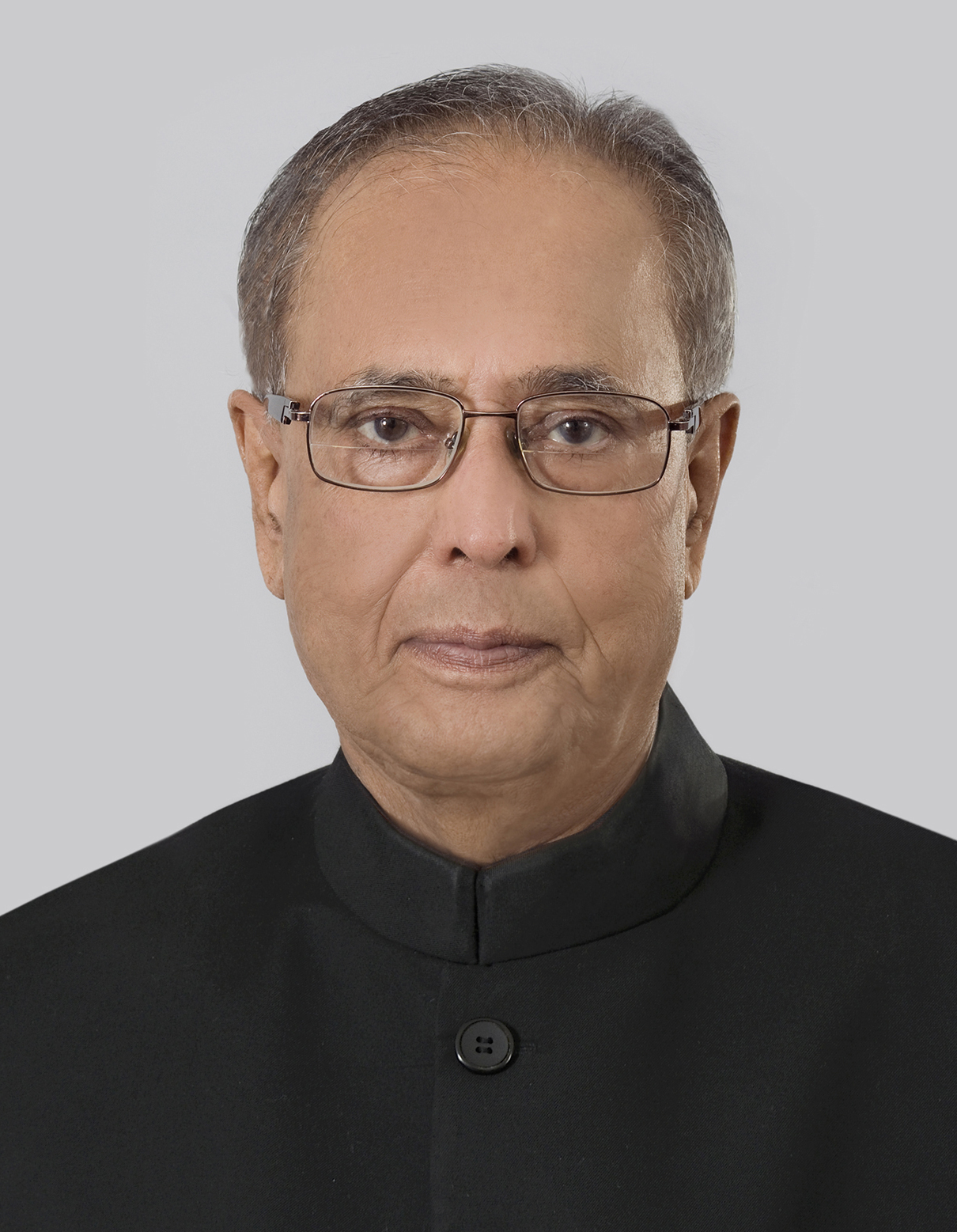
Pranab Mukherjee

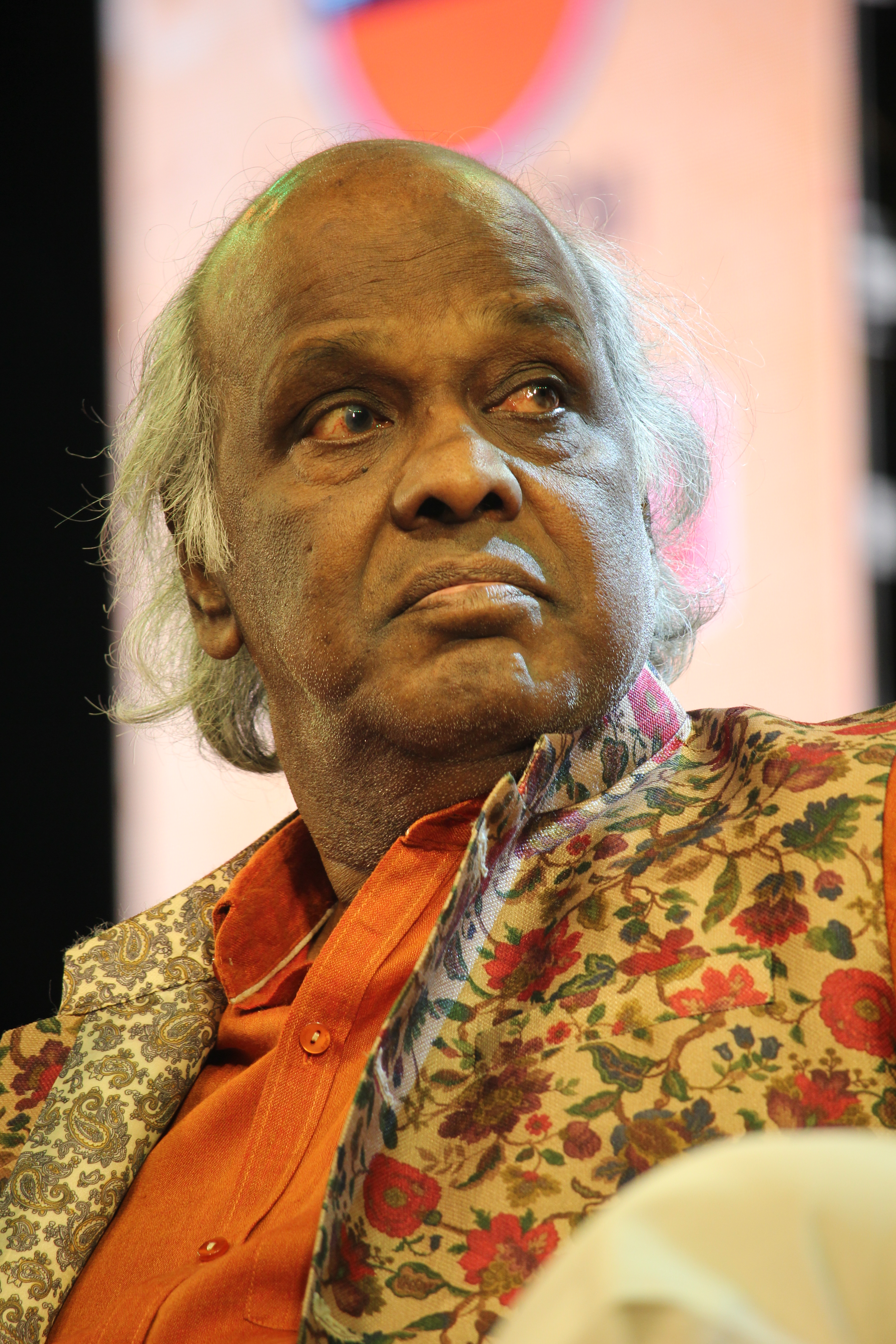
Rahat Indori

- 1 August – Amar Singh, 64, politician (b. 1956)
- 1 August – Pydikondala Manikyala Rao, 58, politician (b. 1961)
- 2 August – Kamal Rani Varun, politician, 62, (b. 1958).
- 5 August – Shivajirao Nilangekar Patil, Politician, Ex-CM of Maharashtra, 88, (b. 1931)
- 5 August – Samir Sharma, Television Actor, 44, (b. 1976)
- 5 August – Anil Rathod, Politician, 70, (b. 1950)
- 11 August – Rahat Indori, Poet and lyricist, 70, (b. 1950)
- 16 August
  - Chetan Chauhan, Cricketer and Politician, 73 (b. 1947)
  - B Ahmed Hajee Mohiudeen, conglomerate executive and philanthropist (b. 1933).
  - Vijay Mude, 77, Politician, (b. 1943)
- 17 August
  - Nishikant Kamat, Filmmaker & Actor, (b. 1970)
  - Jasraj, Classical singer, (b. 1930)
- 19 August – Gopalaswamy Kasturirangan, cricketer (b. 1930).
- 20 August
  - A. Rahman Khan, politician (born 1942–1943).
  - Janmejay Singh, politician (b. 1945).
- 23 August – A. B. Raj, film director (b. 1925).
- 31 August – Pranab Mukherjee, Former President. (b.1935).

=== September ===
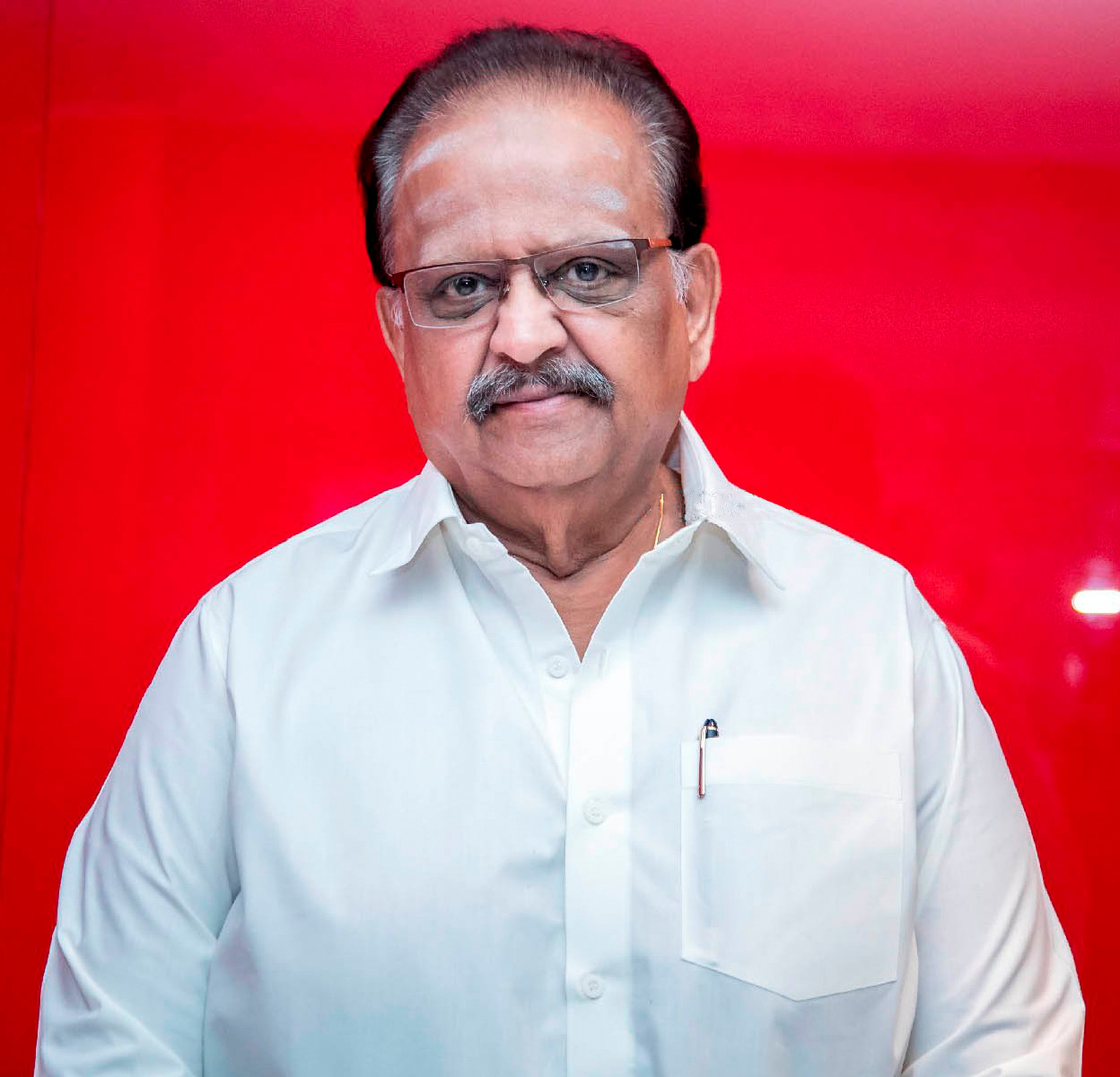
S. P. Balasubrahmanyam

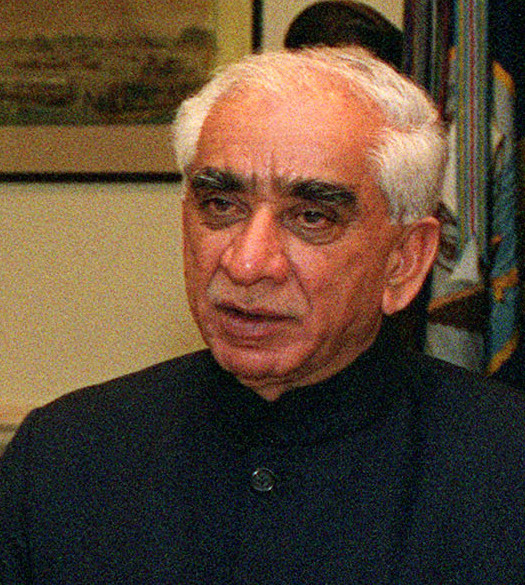
Jaswant Singh

- 2 September –
  - Shekhar Gawli, cricketer (b. 1975).
  - M. J. Appaji Gowda, politician, (b. 1949 or 1950).
  - Ramkrishna Baba Patil, politician (b. 1936).
- 5 September – Johnny Bakshi, film producer, director and actor (b. 1932).
- 6 September
  - Kesavananda Bharati, Hindu monk and civil rights activist (b. 1940).
  - Paul Chittilapilly, Syro-Malabar Catholic hierarch, Bishop of Kalyan and Thamarassery (b. 1934).
  - Nirvendra Kumar Mishra, politician (b. 1944/1945).
  - S. Mohinder, composer and music director (b. 1925).
- 8 September – Jaya Prakash Reddy, actor. (b. 1946)
- 10 September – Vadivel Balaji, actor and television personality (b. 1975)
- 12 September – Sudhangan, journalist, television presenter, editor and novelist (b. 1957)
- 25 September – S. P. Balasubrahmanyam, playback singer (b. 1946)
- 27 September — Jaswant Singh, former union cabinet minister (b. 1938)

=== October ===
- 8 October – Ram Vilas Paswan, politician (b. 1946)
- 12 October – C. M. Chang, politician (b. 1940)
- 25 October – Mahesh Kanodia, singer and politician (b. 1937)
- 27 October – Naresh Kanodia, film actor and musician (b. 1943)

=== November ===
- 15 November – Soumitra Chatterjee, film actor, director, playwright, writer, and poet (b. 1935)
- 23 November - Tarun Gogoi, Chief Minister of Assam

=== December ===
- 4 December – Narinder Singh Kapany, Indian-American physicist (b. 1926)
- 9 December – V. J. Chitra, actress, anchor (b. 1992)
- 23 December – Sugathakumari, poet, activist (b. 1934)
- 28 December - Dr. Mahinder Watsa, sexologist, coloumnist. (b. 1924)

== See also ==
=== Country overviews ===
- India
- History of India
- History of modern India
- Outline of India
- Government of India
- Politics of India
- Timeline of Indian history
- Years in India

=== Related timelines for current period ===
- 2020
- 2020 in politics and government
- 2020s
