= Srisailam hydroelectric power plant fire =

Fire in Andhra Pradesh, India

2020 Srisailam hydroelectric plant fire
- Date: 20 August 2020
- Location: Srisailam, Telangana, India
- Cause: Electrical short circuit in the power plant
- Deaths: 9

On 20 August 2020, a major fire broke out in late night hours in an underground hydroelectric power plant in Srisailam in the state of Telangana. The fire killed nine people, including five engineers and 15 employees who were inside the power plant escaped since the fire broke out. It was suspected that the fire broke out due to a short circuit situated at Srisailam's dam left bank. The fire was brought under control by the firefighters after several hours of struggle as of 21 August 2020 and the rescue operations were delayed for hours due to smoke. The bodies of nine workers were recovered during the rescue operations.

== Background ==
India has recorded numerous cases related to fire accidents in the history mainly due to lack of safety facilities and inadequate fire extinguishers. The Visakhapatnam gas leak, Vijayawada fire, the Delhi factory fire, and the Delhi hotel fire were the country's worst fire accidents in the recent times. India is currently the third worst affected country in the world due to the COVID-19 pandemic and the fire incident has posed further burden and humiliation to the healthcare sector impacted by the COVID-19 pandemic in India.

== Response ==
Chief minister of Telangana K. Chandrasekhar Rao ordered an immediate inquiry by the CID to probe regarding the incident. The state government has announced an ex-gratia of Rs 50 lakh for the kin of the engineers and Rs 20 lakh for the others. Andhra Pradesh chief minister Jagan Mohan Reddy who was scheduled to visit Srisailam for an aerial survey of a project apparently cancelled his visit and instead promised to offer assistance.

Indian Prime Minister Narendra Modi expressed his deep condolences regarding the tragic incident and tweeted that he was anguished by the terrible incident.
