= Delhi hotel fire =

Delhi hotel fire may refer to these hotel fires in Delhi, India:

- 2019 Delhi hotel fire
- 2026 Delhi hotel fire
