= 2019 Delhi fire =

2019 Delhi fire may refer to:

- 2019 Delhi hotel fire, in February
- 2019 Delhi factory fire, in December
