= Health in Gurdaspur district =

Overview of health in Gurdaspur district

Health in Gurdaspur refers to the state of complete physical, mental and social well-being of the people of Gurdaspur district, in Punjab, India. It involves wide range of factors like health indicators, nutrition, medical facilities, pollution levels and socio–economic factors. As of 2021, 23.5% of households in the district had a member covered under a health insurance or finance scheme.

== History ==
In 1901, riots were recorded in Punjab province in some plague-hit areas like Gurdaspur, along with Patiala and Sialkot, as some people refused compulsory hospitalisation and quarantine.

One of the worst ecological disasters in Punjab took place in May 2018, when an estimated 10,000 litres of molasses got spilled into Beas river from a sugar mill in Gurdaspur district. It contaminated a large part of irrigation canal system and killed tonnes of aquatic life. Districts of Faridkot, Muktsar and Fazilka were most severely affected. The contaminated canal water may have entered drinking water sources and intakes from canals for drinking water supply was shut down. This led to the rationing or severely curtailing the drinking water supply in the affected towns.

During the 2020 Punjab alcohol poisoning, at least 14 people died in Gurdaspur in August 7, due to the consumption of spurious liquor. The total death toll in Punjab was 121, with most of the victims from Taran Taran district.

The first COVID-19 case in Gurdaspur district was reported on April 14, 2020. A 60-year-old man in Bhaini Paswal village in Kahnuwan block was tested positive. He also became the first person to die because of COVID-19 in the district. He died on April 16, 2020, at Guru Nanak Dev Hospital in Amritsar. He was also the 14th recorded casualty of coronavirus in Punjab.

In October 2023, Gurdaspur district administration announced a new scheme under which the farmers who abstain from burning stubble will be recognized and will receive "vatavaran de rakhe" (protectors of environment) certificates. According to the Deputy Commissioner of Gurdaspur, these certificates will allow them to get priority in government offices and they will not have to wait in a queue. The villages who report zero stubble burning will also receive these certificates and will be given priority in government projects. This scheme was started to stop farmers from burning crop residue, which causes heavy air pollution.

== Children ==
As of 2019, there were 174,398 children below the age of 5 years in Gurdaspur district. In that same year, a total of 21,031 live births took place in the district, of which 20,758 were institutional births. According to the National Family Health Survey–5 (2019–20), 90.2% of the children between the ages of 12 and 23 months were fully vaccinated based on the information from the vaccination cards.

The table below shows the data from the district nutrition profile of children below the age of 5 years, in Gurdaspur, as of year 2020.

District nutrition profile of children under 5 years of age in Gurdaspur, year 2020
Indicators	Number of children (<5 years)	Percent (2020)
Stunted	43,739	25%
Wasted	16,481	9%
Severely wasted	7,883	5%
Underweight	26,648	15%
Overweight/obesity	11,353	7%
Anemia	1,09,852	70%
Total children	1,74,398	

== Women ==
In 2016, 88.5% women in Gurdaspur district gave birth in a health facility, which was the second lowest in the state. In 2016, 42.1% of the children up to 59 months of age received postnatal care within two days of their birth, which was fourth lowest in the state. In the same year, 83.7% of the women received postnatal care within two days of childbirth, which was fifth lowest in the state.

According to NFHS–5 (2019–20), 61.1% of mothers in the district had at least 4 antenatal care visits.

The table below shows the district nutrition profile of Gurdaspur of women between the ages of 15 and 49 years, as of year 2020.

District nutritional profile of Gurdaspur of women of 15–49 years, in 2020
Indicators	Number of women (15–49 years)	Percent (2020)
Underweight (BMI <18.5 kg/m^2)	81,803	11%
Overweight/obesity	3,01,906	41%
Hypertension	2,70,494	37%
Diabetes	1,11,229	15%
Anemia (non-preg)	4,09,457	56%
Anemia (preg)	10,904	43%
Total women (preg)	25,287	
Total women	7,35,639	

The table below shows the current use of family planning methods by currently married women between the ages of 15 and 49 years, in Gurdaspur district.

Family planning methods used by women between the ages of 15 and 49 years, in Gurdaspur district
Method	Total (2015–16)	Rural (2015–16)
Female sterilization	42.1%	44.7%
Male sterilization	0.4%	0.0%
IUD/PPIUD	4.1%	3.8%
Pill	1.8%	2.6%
Condom	20.1%	19.5%
Any modern method	68.5%	70.7%
Any method	74.5%	76.6%
Total unmet need	5.2%	5.5%
Unmet need for spacing	2.7%	2.8%

== Diseases ==
In the year 2017, Gurdaspur district recorded 12 malaria cases, which was tenth lowest in Punjab. As of July 2019, there were a recorded 3,267 people who were HIV positive. This was the positivity rate of 0.85% of the 383,963 who were tested for it. This rate was lower than the state average of 1.09%.

In 2016–17, a study was conducted on the students between the ages of 16 and 23 years, who were studying in various institutions of Batala city in the district. It found that 21.06% of males and 12.70% of females were obese, if the criteria of Body Mass Index (BMI) is used.

== Drug use ==
As of June 2024, about 90% of the drug addicts in the district use heroin. During the 2020 Punjab alcohol poisoning, 14 people died in Gurdaspur district after drinking spurious liquor.

In April 2024, alcohol that was meant to be sold in Gurdaspur and Bathinda was found in Bihar, where alcohol is illegal at that time. This brings to light the use of liquor vends in the district for liquor smuggling.

== Accidents ==
A total of 191 road accidents were recorded in 2022 in Gurdaspur district in which 161 persons died and 101 were injured. And a total of 242 vehicles were involved in accidents in that year in the district. The number of people killed 2022, which was 161, was higher than those killed in 2021, which was 156.

The table below shows the number of road accidents and people affected in Gurdaspur district by year.

Road accidents and people affected in Gurdaspur district by year
Year	Accidents	Killed	Injured	Vehicles Involved
2022	191	161	101	242
2021	178	156	79	234
2020	178	158	92	266
2019	227	162	109	308

== Pollution ==
A study was conducted in Gurdaspur district in which groundwater samples were collected from 25 locations in December 2019. It was found that Arsenic exceed the permissible limited in about 80% of the samples. The higher arsenic values may be associated with higher cancer risk.

== Health Facilities ==
As of 2018, the number of registered doctors in the Gurdaspur district were 1,642 and registered nurses were 6,118. Which means the average population served per doctor for that year was 1,058.

A report in June 2024, showed that drug addicts were being treated without the aid of a psychiatrist at the Red Cross de-addiction center at Gurdaspur, as the position of psychiatrist was empty at that time.

The table given below shows the population served per doctor in Gurdaspur district, by years.

Population served per doctor in Gurdaspur district by years
Year	Population	Year	Population
2018	1,058	2000	2,490
2012	1,671	1999	2,382
2010	1,845	1998	2,377
2008	2,091	1997	2,441
2007	2,108	1996	2,536
2006	1,973	1995	2,558
2005	2,228	1994	2,598
2004	2,408	1993	3,019
2003	2,478	1992	2,043
2002	2,452	1991	2,806
2001	2,547	1990	2,986

== See also ==
- Gurdaspur district
- Health in Punjab, India
- Women in Punjab, India
