= 2026 Delhi hotel fire =

2026 hotel fire in New Delhi, India

- Date: 3 June 2026
- Time: Approximately 9:45 a.m. IST
- Location: Malviya Nagar, New Delhi, India
- Type: Hotel fire
- Cause: Under investigation
- Deaths: 22
- Injuries: 40+

On 3 June 2026, a fire at the Flourish Stay bed-and-breakfast hotel in the Hauz Rani area of Malviya Nagar, New Delhi, India killed 22 people and injured more than 40 others. Several of the victims were foreign nationals who had traveled to Delhi for medical treatment.

== Fire ==
The fire broke out on the morning of 3 June 2026. It originated in a air fryer that caught fire in the ground-floor kitchen. Employees attempted to smother the fire with a wet blanket, after which the fire spread across the kitchen. They tried to put it out with a fire extinguisher, but the fire had already spread to the rest of the ground floor.

Local residents quickly attempted to rescue those trapped in the fire: a local blanket and cotton shop owner spread quilts and mattresses on the ground to cushion the fall of those jumping from the burning building, while others performed CPR on the victims.

The Delhi Fire Service deployed ten fire engines to the scene.

=== Casualties ===
The fire killed 22 people, including eight members of a single family. Among the deceased, five were from Nigeria, three from Kyrgyzstan, and one each from Mozambique, Uzbekistan, Bangladesh, Democratic Republic of the Congo, Liberia, and Iraq. The Indian victims were a family from Gurgaon and Rajasthan.

== Aftermath ==
Vice President C. P. Radhakrishnan expressed condolences to the families of the victims.

Canadian Foreign Minister Anita Anand and the UAE Ministry of Foreign Affairs offered their condolences.

== See also ==
- Uphaar Cinema fire
- 2019 Delhi hotel fire
- 2022 Delhi fire
- 2020 Vijayawada fire
