= 2020 Vijayawada fire =

Fire in Andhra Pradesh, India

- Date: 9 August 2020
- Location: Vijayawada, Andhra Pradesh, India; 16.5128°N 80.6231°E
- Cause: Electrical short-circuit in air conditioner
- Deaths: 11
- Injuries: 22

On 9 August 2020 at around 5 am IST, a major fire broke out at a COVID-19 facility located at the Hotel Swarna Palace in the city of Vijayawada, in the state of Andhra Pradesh. The fire killed 11 people and wounded a further 22. The hotel was being used as a temporary COVID-19 facility by the private hospital Ramesh Hospitals Vijayawada. An electrical short circuit was described as the ultimate reason for the incident. The fire was brought under control by the firefighters within 30 minutes. Survivors were transferred to another quarantine centre.

== Background ==
Fatal fires in India are common due to lack of safety facilities and inadequate fire extinguishers. The Visakhapatnam gas leak, the Delhi factory fire, and the Delhi hotel fire were the country's deadliest fires in the recent times. At the time, India was the second worst affected country in the world due to the COVID-19 pandemic and the fire further burdened the strained healthcare sector.

== Incident ==
The fire broke out on the first and second floors before spreading quickly to the third and fifth floors. Two patients screamed for help and jumped from the hotel terrace to escape from the blaze. Nine patients died due to suffocation caused by fire blaze and one reportedly died succumbing to burn injuries. There were a total of about 30 patients being treated for COVID-19 along with 10 hospital staff prior to the incident.

== Development ==
Ramesh Hospitals Vijayawada branch had Memorandum of understanding agreement with the Swarna Palace Hotel to run and maintain a COVID-19 centre on a lease basis. It was revealed that the COVID-19 centre was opened in the Swarna Palace on 9 August 2020 and on the same day itself a fire broke out due to electrical defects. A FIR was also filed against both the Ramesh Hospitals and the Swarna Palace for the possible acknowledgment regarding the electrical defects before establishing the COVID-19 centre. Vijayawada COVID-19 hotel facility was later blamed for violating fire safety norms and measures.

== Response ==
Andhra Pradesh CM YS Jagan Mohan Reddy announced a relief package compensation of five million rupees for the affected families. Indian Prime Minister Narendra Modi expressed his deep condolences regarding the tragic incident and tweeted that he was anguished by the terrible incident.
