= 2022 Surat gas leak =

Coordinates: 21.090°N 72.856°E

- Date: 6 January 2022
- Location: Sachin, Surat, Gujarat, India
- Type: gas leak
- Deaths: 6
- Injuries: 22-29

On 6 January 2022, at least six people died and 22 people became sick following gas leak from a tanker in an industrial area in Sachin, Surat, Gujarat, India.

== Incident and rescue ==
Around 4:25 am IST on 6 January 2022, the gas leaked from a tanker parked in Sachin GIDC, an industrial area. It was reported that the driver of the tanker was illegally dumping the chemical waste in the drain which resulted in the gas leak. The driver fled. The labourers sleeping in nearby textile mill and outside were affected. They fell unconscious following inhaling the leaked gas and were admitted in the New Civil Hospital in Surat. At least six people died and 22 people were hospitalised. Two stray dogs also died. The fire brigade sealed the tanker. The leaked chemical was identified as sodium hydrosulphite. The people from the area were evacuated as a precaution.

== Relief ==
The government of Gujarat paid an ex gratia of ₹4 lakh (US$4,200) while the textile mill owner where the labourers worked paid ₹2 lakh (US$2,100) to the next of kin of each person who died.

== Investigation ==
The initial investigation revealed that the chemical was purchased from Hikal Ltd, a pharma-chemical factory from Taloja in Maharashtra on pretext of selling it to another company and then was illegally dump in Surat by the accused. An FIR was also register against the managing director of the Hikal Ltd and other officials. Eleven people were arrested by state police. Later the case was transferred to the crime branch which had arrested 13 people by April 2022 and five people were absconding.

The National Green Tribunal (NGT) issued notice to the Gujarat Pollution Control Board. The NGT constituted nine member committee for investigation. The report from committee was accepted in March 2023.

== See also ==
- Visakhapatnam gas leak
- List of industrial disasters
