= CamScanner =

Mobile scanner app

CamScanner is a Chinese mobile app first released in 2010 that allows iOS and Android devices to be used as image scanners. It allows users to 'scan' documents (by taking a photo with the device's camera) and share the photo as either a JPEG or PDF. This app is available free of charge on the Google Play Store and the Apple App Store. The app is based on the freemium model, having an ad-supported free version and a premium version with additional features.

== History ==
On August 27, 2019, Russian cyber security company Kaspersky Lab discovered that recent versions of the Android app distributed an advertising library containing a Trojan Dropper, which was also included in some apps preinstalled on several Chinese mobiles. The advertising library decrypts a Zip archive which subsequently downloads additional files from servers controlled by hackers, allowing the hackers to control the device, including by showing intrusive advertising or charging paid subscriptions. Google took the app down after Kaspersky reported its findings. An updated version of the app with the advertising library removed was made available on the Google Play Store as of September 5, 2019. Kaspersky later acknowledged "We appreciate the willingness to cooperate that we've seen from CamScanner representatives, as well as the responsible attitude to user safety they demonstrated while eliminating the threat…The malicious modules were removed from the app immediately upon Kaspersky's warning, and Google Play has restored the app."

In June 2020, as tensions along the Line of Actual Control between China and India continued, the Government of India decided to ban 118 Chinese apps, including TikTok and CamScanner citing data and privacy issues.

On January 5, 2021, US President Donald Trump signed Executive Order 13971 banning Alipay, Tencent's QQ, QQ Wallet, WeChat Pay, CamScanner, Shareit, VMate and WPS Office to conduct US transactions. The Trump administration explained this act by saying that this move helps prevent personal information such as text, phone calls and photos collected from rivals. However, the Biden administration did not meet the February 2021 deadline for implementing the executive order, allowing these apps to operate in the US and revoked the previous executive order Executive Order 14034 of June 9, 2021.
