= Vidya Bal =

Indian writer (c.1937–2020)

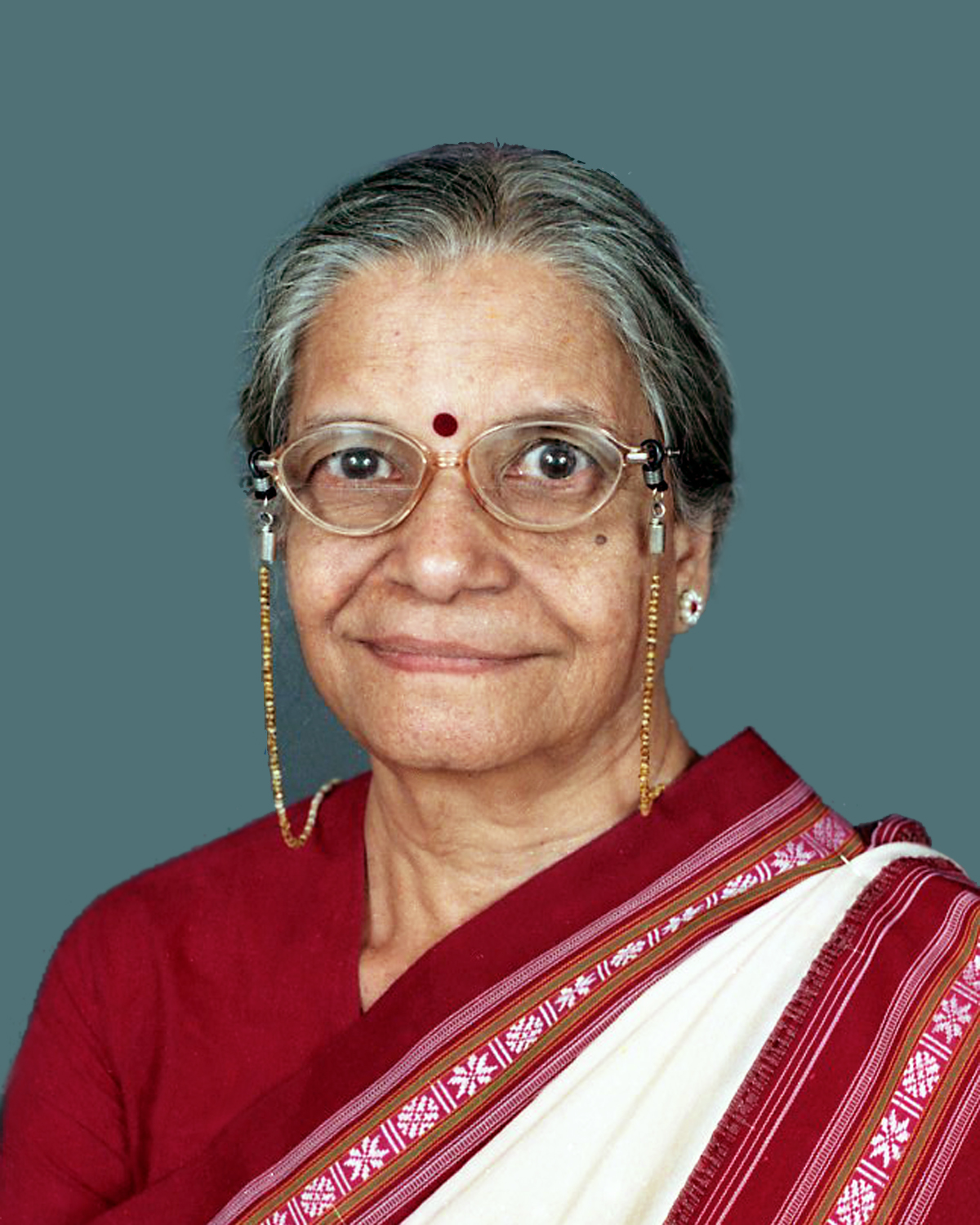
- Born: 12 January 1937
- Died: 30 January 2020 (aged 83); Pune, Maharashtra, India
- Occupations: Writer; Editor; Social activist
- Years active: 1964–2020
- Movement: Feminism in India

Vidya Bal (12 January 1937 – 30 January 2020) was a Marathi feminist writer and editor from Maharashtra, India. She was a social activist particularly in the area of equalization of the social status of women vis-à-vis men in India.

== Biography ==
She joined the editorial staff of monthly Stree (स्त्री) in 1964, and then worked from 1983 to 1986 as its full-time editor. After leaving the editorship of Stree, she founded monthly Miloon Saryajani (मिळून सार्‍याजणी) in 1989. Her notable works include the biography Kamlaki and novel Valvantatil Vat.

Vidya Bal fought a legal battle in the High Court of Maharashtra for women getting the right to enter various places of worship. The High Court decided in favour of her Petipa on 1 April 1899.

== Literary works ==
- Sanwad (संवाद)
- Katha Gaurichi (कथा गौरीची)
- Tumachya Majhyasathi (तुमच्या माझ्यासाठी)
- Aparajitanche Nihshwas (अपराजितांचे नि:श्वास)
- Shodh Swatahacha (शोध स्वत:चा)
- Kamalaki (कमलाकी) (Biography)
