= B. Ahmed Hajee Mohiudeen =

Indian businessman (1933–2020)

Bolar Ahmed Hajee Mohiudeen (18 June 1933 – 16 August 2020) was the Founder Chairman of B A Group, headquartered at Thumbay, Mangalore, Karnataka state, India. He died at the age of 87 on 16 August 2020 at Mangalore, India.

== Early life ==
Mohiudeen was born on 18 June 1933 to B. Mohiudeen Haji and Mariamma in a business family in Mangalore, Karnataka, India. His father was a prominent name in the maritime business. Mohiudeen graduated in commerce in 1954 and began his career soon after, as a small-scale industrialist in an undistinguished village called Thumbay in South Karnataka. He founded the B A Group, in 1957.

== Career ==
Mohiudeen was the chairman of the B A Group, which he founded in 1957. The company initially operated in the wood industry and later expanded into sectors including real estate, housing, education, healthcare, and international trade.

B A Industrial Training and Technical Centre is sponsored and managed by Mohiudeen Educational Trust, of which Mohiudeen was the chairman. The Trust also runs a Kannada and English Medium School, a Pre-University College a Nursery School, a Medium Primary School and Darul Uloom Mohiudeen Arabic College. There are more than 1,500 students in these institutions.

== Organization and community leaderships ==
Mohiudeen was the founder president of a number of institutions and trusts in Mangalore and surrounding areas. He was the president of the 80-year-old Badriya Educational Institutions at Mangalore. He was also the president of Nav Bharat Night High School, which was established before India's independence. He was one of the Trustees of Islamic Academy of Education, under Yenepoya Group, India.

He was a member of the Adult Education Society, Government of Karnataka. He was also a syndicate member of Mangalore University.

== Awards and recognitions ==
- Conferred with honorary doctorate for his outstanding contributions to community development, by Gulf Medical University (GMU), the leading private medical university of the Middle East region located in Ajman, UAE.
- Recipient of Lifetime Achievement Award from the former President of India, Dr. A.P.J. Abdul Kalam.
- Received Export Performance Award from Ramanath Rai, District in Charge Minister – Govt. of Karnataka.
- Felicitated by Tulu Koota, Kuwait for his efforts in uplifting the underprivileged.
