= Sunanda Patnaik =

Indian classical singer (1934–2020)

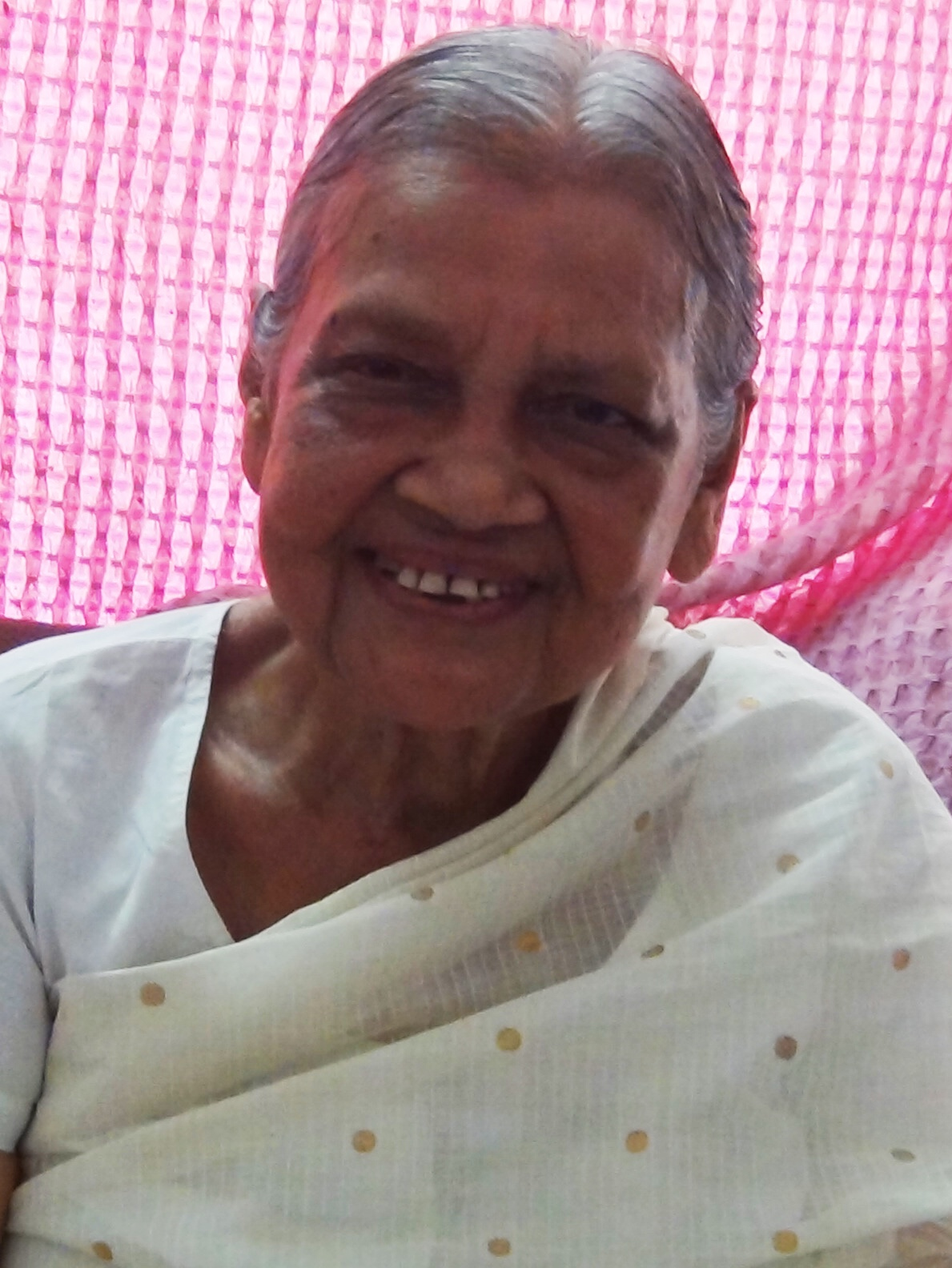
- Sunanda Patnaik while signing an autograph

Background information
- Born: 7 November 1934; Baramba
- Origin: Puri / Cuttack, Odisha, India
- Died: 19 January 2020 (aged 85) Kolkata, West Bengal, India
- Genres: Hindustani classical music
- Occupations: Singer, composer

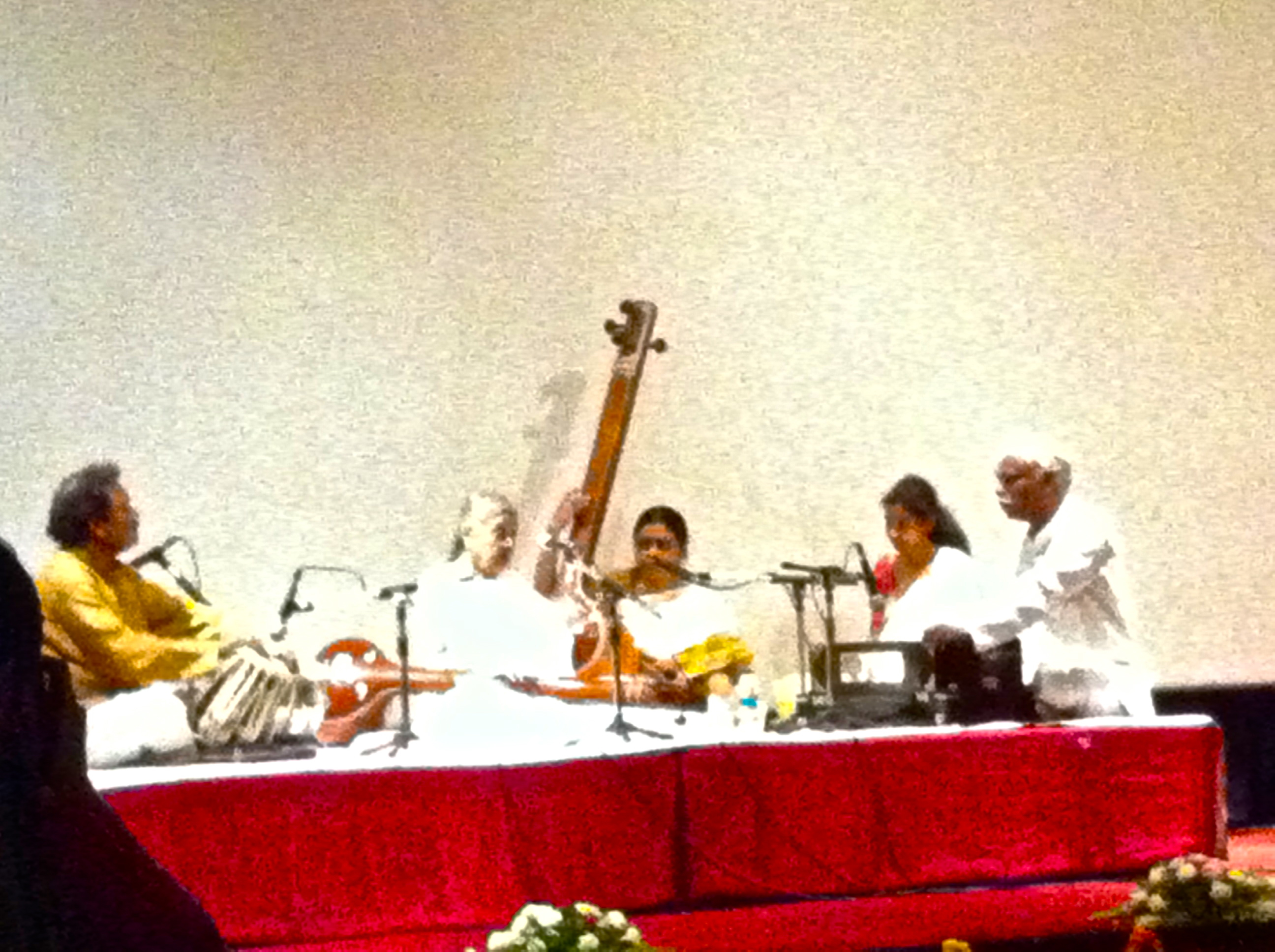
Sunanda Patnaik performing at New Delhi, May 2012

Sunanda Patnaik (7 November 1934 – 19 January 2020) was an Indian classical singer of Gwalior gharana from Odisha. Popularly known as "guruma", she was considered one of the grande dames of Hindustani music. She was the daughter of Odia poet Baikunthanath Patnaik. She started singing at All India Radio in Cuttack in 1948 at the age of 14. The then Odisha Governor Asaf Ali once heard her on Radio and was very impressed with her singing and she became a regular fixture at the Raj Bhavan whenever the Governor had guests. Once, President Rajendra Prasad heard her at Puri. He was very impressed with her singing and arranged her training under Pandit Vinayak Rao Pattavardhan at Pune with a scholarship. She was awarded the degree of Masters in Music by Pune School in 1956. She performed at All India Sadrang Sageet Sammelan in Calcutta in September 1957 where she received 13 gold coins. Since then she did many concerts in India and was known internationally. She was best known for her tarana that she sang at a high pace and was considered one of the best contemporary interpreters of Odissi music. She was staying at Kolkata since 1983.

== Awards ==
She received the Odisha Sangeet Natak Academy award in 1970 and 1971. She received Indian lifetime achievement award in 2009 and lifetime achievement award from The Orissa society of the Americas (OSA) in 2012. She was the recipient of Sangeet Natak Academy award (Tagore Academy Puraskar) for the year 2012. The degree of doctor of literature was conferred on her by the Utkal University in 1999 and the degree of doctor of music was conferred by the Akhil Bharatiya Gandharva Mahavidyalaya Mandal in 1975.

In October 2020, Odisha Government renamed the award conferred by the Odisha Sangeet Natak Akademy as ‘Sunanda Samman’ for excellence in classical music in her honour.

== In popular culture ==
Nilamadhaba is a National Film Award-winning documentary film about her. The film was directed by Sri Dilip Patnaik and produced by Films Division. It won the "Best Biographical documentary" for the year 2010 at the 58th National Film Awards in India.

== Bibliography ==
- A Discography of Hindustani and Karnatic Music

== Gallery ==
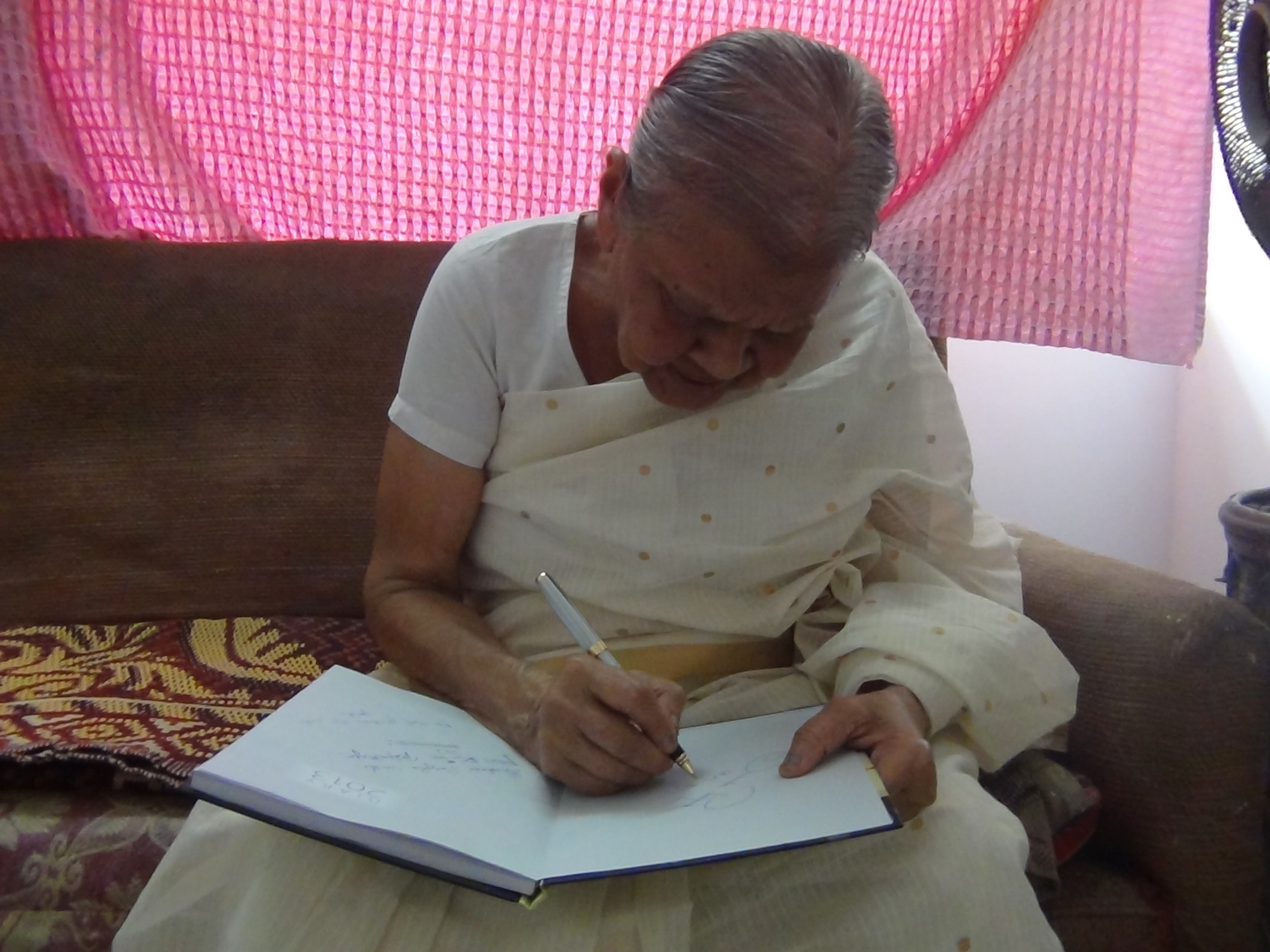
Sunanda Patnaik Signing autograph

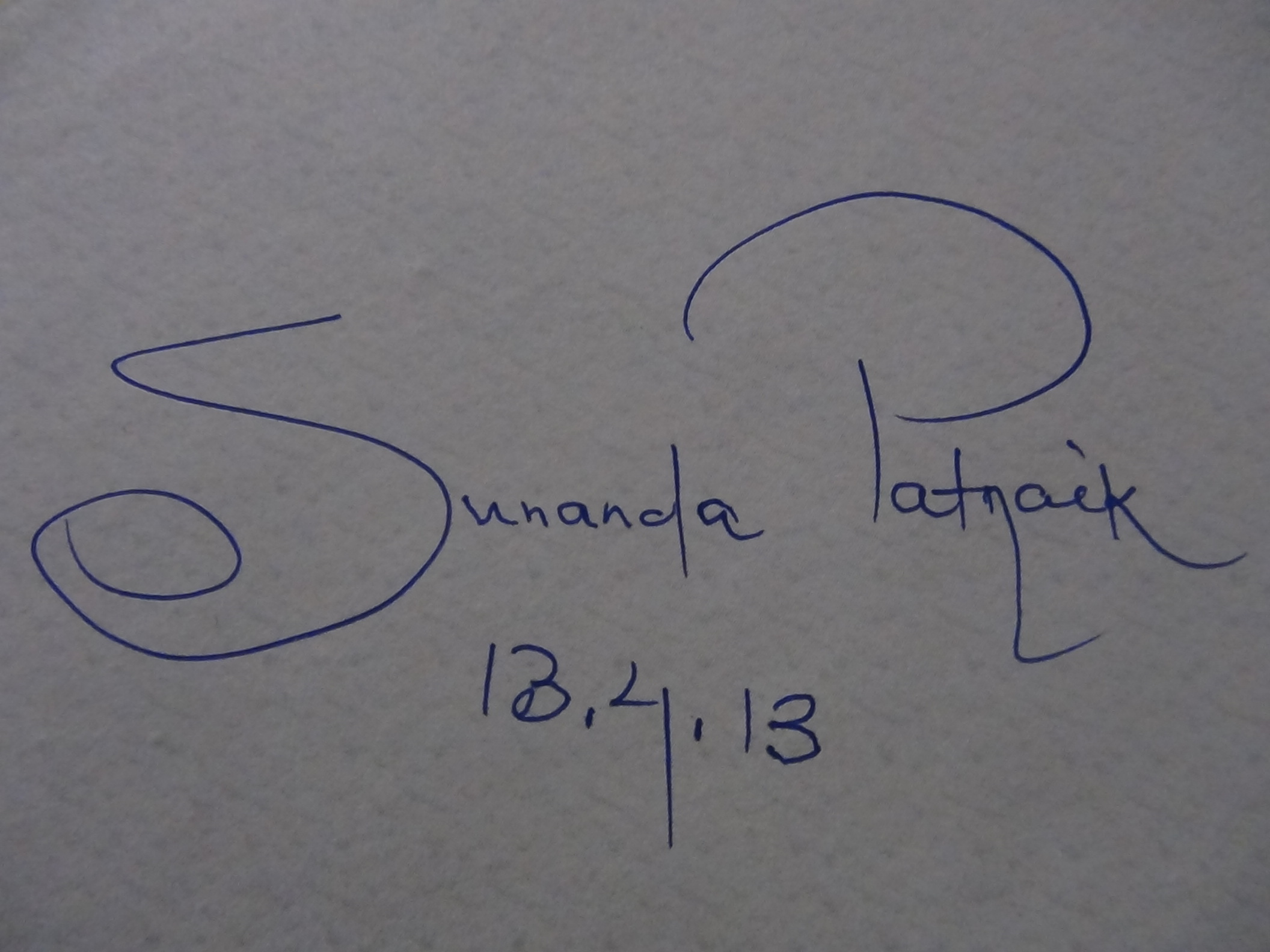
Sunanda Patnaik's signature
