= Ramesh Hospitals =

Hospital group in Andhra Pradesh, India

Ramesh Hospitals is a group of 3 tertiary care hospitals in the south Indian state Andhra Pradesh.
