= Neela Satyanarayanan =

Indian civil servant (1948–2020)

Neela Satyanarayanan (née Mandake) (pronounced [ni:la: sətjəna:ra:yənən]; 5 February 1948 – 16 July 2020) was an Indian author and civil servant. She was the first female State Election Commissioner in Maharashtra.

== Biography ==
Satyanarayanan was born on 5 February 1948 in Mumbai to Sushila and Vasudev Mandake. Her father was a police officer. She studied in Mumbai, Pune and Nashik, graduating from the Delhi School Board with a focus on Sanskrit. She entered the Indian Administrative Service after completing undergraduate and postgraduate degrees.

Satyanarayanan was diagnosed with COVID-19 during the COVID-19 pandemic in India in July 2020, and died at the age of 72, following complications in Mumbai, on 16 July 2020. Satyanarayanan has two children, one of whom was diagnosed with Down Syndrome, and has written about her experience of motherhood in a memoir titled, One Full, One Half.

== Career ==
Satyanarayanan was a member of the Indian Administrative Service, graduating in 1972 in the Maharashtra cadre. During her career as a civil servant, she held posts in the Home, Forest, and Social Welfare departments in the Maharashtra Government, and retired as the Additional Chief Secretary (Revenue) in 2009. She served as the Principal Secretary for the Shiv Sena-BJP coalition government led by Chief Minister Manohar Joshi from 1995 to 1999. She also served as the Director-General of Information and Public Relations for the Maharashtra government.

After her retirement from civil service, she was appointed as the State Election Commissioner in Maharashtra, succeeding Nand Lal, and held the position until July 2014. The 2012 local elections in Maharashtra were conducted during her tenure.

Following her retirement from civil service, Satyanarayanan lectured at the MIT Civil Services Training Institute in Pune on public administration.

== Writing and Publications ==
Satyanarayanan wrote extensively in Marathi, with seven novels and ten volumes of poetry published at the time of her death. She also wrote two memoirs.

=== Non-Fiction ===
In 2005 Satyanarayanan published a memoir titled एक पूर्ण अपूर्ण (One Full, One Half) focusing on her experience of raising a child with Down Syndrome while managing her career as a civil servant. It was translated into English and Hindi. A second memoir, जाळरेषा (Network) focused on her experiences in four decades of civil service, and Satyanarayanan donated the proceeds from the sale of this book to a non-profit organisation, founded by actor Nana Patekar, to support farmers in Maharashtra.

In addition to these, Satyanarayanan has published a number of works of non-fiction, including पुनर्भेट (Reunion) (essays and criticism) and सत्यकथा (True Legends), a religious text. Satyanarayanan drew from her work in multiple departments of the Government of Maharashtra to write several manuals, including पालकांच्या मार्गदर्शनासाठी केस स्टडीज (Case Studies for Parental Guidance), एक दिवस जीवनातला (A Day in the Life, 2015), a book on environmental conservation, drawing from her experience in the Department of Forestry of the Government of Maharashtra; क्रांतिज्योती (Krantijyoti), a guidebook for women in local government; and टाकीचे घाव (Tank Wound), an account of the conduct of local elections in Maharashtra.

Her contributions to Marathi newspapers and magazines, in the form of articles and regular columns, were also published in two compilations, आयुष्य जगताना (Living Life), and डेल्टा 15 (Delta 15).

=== Fiction ===
Satyanarayanan wrote and published four novels:

- तुझ्याविना (Without You)
- रात्र वणव्याची (The Night Has Ended)
- ऋण (Loan)
- तिढा (Bitter)

=== Poetry ===
Satyanarayanan has published several volumes of poetry:

- आकाश पेलताना (When The Sky Rises)
- अग्निपुष्प (Flower of Fire)
- अमृत बरसा (Rain of Nectar)
- असीम (Infinite)
- आषाढ मेघ (Season of Clouds)
- एक शहर था (There Was a City)
- मातीची मने (Hearts of Clay)
- ओळखीची वाट (Waiting for an Introduction)
- झुलते मनात गाणे (Songs in a Swinging Mind)

=== Other works ===
Satyanarayanan has also translated Smita Jaykar's book, आत्ता नाही तर केव्हा..? into English, as Before Tomorrow. She had penned 150 songs and composed music for several Marathi movies and two Bollywood movies. She was a recipient of several awards in the fields of literature and culture. The 2016 Marathi film, Babanchi Shala (Parents' School), starring Sayaji Shinde, was based on Satyanarayanan's life, and she directed the music for that film.

In 2017, Satyanarayanan composed a song in honor of the Mumbai Fire Brigade, at the request of the Chief Fire Officer. The song, 'Let's Go, Let's Go' was adopted by the Mumbai Fire Brigade at a special ceremony held at the Gateway of India.
