= Karmad =

Village in Gujarat, India

Karmad is a village and former petty Rajput princely state on Saurashtra peninsula in Gujarat, Western India.

== History ==
The non-salute princely state in Jhalawar prant was ruled by Jhala Rajput Chieftains. It comprised only the village.

In 1901 it has a population of 465, yielding a state revenue of 8,000 (1903–4, only from land), paying a 231 Rupees tribute to the British and Junagadh State.

== Sources and external links ==
- Imperial Gazetteer on dsal.uchicago.edu - Kathiawar
