= Rameshwar Prasad (Uttar Pradesh politician) =

Indian politician (c.1930s–2020)

Uttar Pradesh Legislative Assembly
- In office 1980–1985
- Preceded by: Deo Kumar
- Succeeded by: Dev Kumar Yadav
- Constituency: Baberu

Personal details
- Born: 1930s
- Died: 3 January 2020 Banda, Uttar Pradesh, India
- Party: Indian National Congress

Rameshwar Prasad (c. 1930s – 3 January 2020) was an Indian politician from Uttar Pradesh belonging to the Indian National Congress. He was a legislator of the Uttar Pradesh Legislative Assembly.

== Biography ==
Prasad was elected as a member of the Uttar Pradesh Legislative Assembly from Baberu in 1980 and served until 1985.

Prasad died on 3 January 2020 from kidney disease.
