= SHAREit =

Singaporean peer-to-peer file sharing platform

- Developer: Smart Media4U Technology Pte.Ltd
- Release: April 28, 2013; 13 years ago

Stable release(s)
- Android: 6.26.68_ww / February 6, 2026; 7 months ago
- iOS: 3.7.38 / April 24, 2022; 4 years ago
- Windows Desktop: 4.0.6.177
- Windows UWP: 1.7.18.0
- Operating system: Android, iOS, Windows 10 Mobile, Windows NT, macOS
- Size: 129.3 MB (iOS); 52 MB (Android)
- Available in: 45 languages including English, Hindi, Bangla, Indonesian, Arabic, Russian etc.
- Licence: Freeware
- Website: shareit.ushareit.com

SHAREit is a peer-to-peer file sharing, content streaming and gaming platform that supports online and offline sharing of files and contents. It allows users access to short format videos and a wide range of games, making it a multimedia entertainment app for users. It works on various smartphone platforms and Windows, allowing users to share files between devices directly. SHAREit was developed as part of Lenovo at its initial stage but was later spun off and operated under a separate Singapore based technology company Smart Technology Pte. Ltd.

== History ==
SHAREit was first released under Lenovo before its ownership was transferred to Smart Media4U Technology based in Singapore. At its initial release, the app was only a peer-to-peer file sharing facilitator. SHAREit later introduced entertainment features into the app, allowing users to watch videos by collaborating with entertainment providers such as Times Music. On 8 May 2018, SHAREit acquired South India OTT platform Fastfilmz app and appointed the founder Karam Malhotra as the partner and vice president of the company.

== Gaming ==
Following the upgrade of SHAREit from peer to peer file and content sharing app, a separate gaming center was introduced into the app allowing users to play HTML5 games and gaming videos.

== India ==
In 2017, Indian Defence Ministry raised security concerns against 42 popular apps including SHAREit, WeChat, Mi Store, Truecaller and ordered its armed forces to uninstall all such apps from phones and computers. SHAREit denied the allegation stating that its security metadata integration program with Google ensures that all apps transferred through SHAREit are screened by Google Play and certified malware free before allowing them to be shared between devices through SHAREit app.

In June 2020, Indian government announced the ban of 59 apps including SHAREit, TikTok, UC Browser, Weibo, Xender as tensions along the Line of Actual Control (LAC) in Ladakh sparked a fatal face-off between the Indian and Chinese armies.They have not removed the ban as of September 2026

== See also ==
- Utility software
