= 2019 Delhi factory fire =

Conflagration in India

2019 Delhi fire
- Date: 8 December 2019
- Time: 4:45–5:00 a.m. IST
- Venue: Luggage bag factory
- Location: Anaj Mandi area, Delhi, India; 28.6594°N 77.2046°E
- Deaths: 43
- Injuries: 56+

Location of the fire in Delhi

On 8 December 2019, a fire occurred at a factory building in Anaj Mandi area of Delhi, India. At least 43 people died and more than 56 were injured.

The fire started at a workshop that produced school bags and shoes. The Delhi Fire Service (DFS) received a call for help around 5:22 a.m. IST and reached the location within five minutes, but their entry to the building was prevented by the intensity of the fire and blockages to the entry points. Gas cutters had to be employed to remove the iron grilles. Thirty-five fire engines extinguished the fire with an estimated 150 firemen involved who were able to rescue 63 people. A team from the National Disaster Response Force was deployed to assist the fire department in the rescue work.

According to the police, most of the people who died were labourers who had been sleeping inside the factory. Doctors stated that deaths were due to asphyxiation caused by smoke inhalation and carbon monoxide poisoning. The cause of the fire is being investigated. A preliminary investigation and eye witness claims have suggested an electrical short circuit may have been the cause.

The factory was operating in a residential area and according to the local fire chief, the building lacked a proper fire license, and its use as a factory was illegal. The Delhi Police Crime Branch is investigating the case, and the owner of the building and his manager were arrested on the day of the fire. Arvind Kejriwal, chief minister of Delhi, announced a compensation of ₹10 lakh (equivalent to ₹12 lakh or US$12,000 in 2023) to the next of kin of each person that died and ₹1 lakh (equivalent to ₹1.2 lakh or US$1,200 in 2023) for the injured. Whereas, Narendra Modi, prime minister of India, also declared a compensation of ₹2 lakh (equivalent to ₹2.4 lakh or US$2,400 in 2023) lakhs rupees for dead and ₹50,000 (equivalent to ₹59,000 or US$610 in 2023) thousand rupees for the injured.

== Fire ==
The fire occurred at the 600 sq ft (56 m^{2}) plot of a luggage bag factory in the Anaj Mandi area of Central Delhi in the early morning of 8 December 2019. At least 100 people were sleeping inside the factory, of whom more than 60 were rescued. According to a report from The Hindu, the fire started in the second floor of the building and quickly spread to the third and fourth floor where the workers had been sleeping. The residents of the first two floors were able to escape, but those on the third and the fourth floors were trapped, since the fire blocked their exit and the windows had iron grilles over them.

One worker made a phone call to his family from the building and stated that they were trapped by the fire and there was no way to escape.

== Rescue ==
The Delhi Fire Service (DFS) received a call for help around 5:22 am IST (UTC+05:30). According to the first responders of the DFS, they had reached the location within five minutes, but their entry to the building was prevented by narrow passageways and the intensity of the fire. A total of thirty five fire engines reached the area and eventually doused the fire.

A firefighter stated that the entry from the terrace was blocked by the locked doors, and that the windows had iron grilles. Gas cutters were employed to remove the grilles. The lane leading to the main entrance was congested and could only allow the entry of one fire engine at a time. A second staircase in the building was blocked with stacks of raw materials for the factory.

An estimated 150 firemen were involved in the rescue operation and rescued 63 people.

A National Disaster Response Force team was deployed to assist the fire department in the rescue work. The NDRF team had searched the factory for any remaining trapped victims and swept the area with gas detectors. According to the NDRF deputy commander, the third and fourth floors were filled with smoke and the levels of hazardous carbon monoxide (CO) were found to be very high.

== Victims ==
Forty-three people died and more than 56 were injured. Two fire fighters were also injured in the incident. According to fire and police officials, the injured were shifted to Lady Hardinge Hospital, RML Hospital, LNJP Hospital, and Hindu Rao Hospital.

An LNJP Hospital official stated that thirty-four people were brought dead to the hospital, with smoke inhalation being the primary cause of the death. Some of the bodies were charred. He added that among the fifteen injured, nine were under observation.

According to the police, most of the dead were labourers who were sleeping inside the factory and died due to asphyxiation.

== Investigation ==
The state government ordered an investigation and a report be delivered within seven days. The cause of the fire is still unknown and is being investigated. According to eye witnesses and the preliminary police investigation, an electrical short circuit was the probable cause. A police official added that a large amount of plastic stored in the premises led to smoke after the fire started. The smoke caused asphyxiation and death among the residents.

The luggage bag factory was operating in a residential area. According to the local fire chief, the building lacked a proper fire licence and its use as a factory was illegal. The Delhi Police filed a case against the two owners of the factory and assigned it to the Crime Branch for investigation. The owner of the building and his manager were arrested on the same day under IPC sections 304 (culpable homicide not amounting to murder) and 285 (negligent conduct with respect to fire or combustible matter).

The government of Delhi stated that Ministry of Housing and Urban Affairs (MoHUA) of the Central Government of India had "minted false claims" about the Delhi factory fire to hide the "corruption and inefficiency of the municipal corporation". It also alleged that the MoHUA was defending the illegal factory. The Delhi Fire service had stated that the factory had no fire clearance or permits to operate and was illegal, and that safety equipment was unavailable.

== Aftermath ==
Prime Minister Narendra Modi tweeted about the incident, calling it "extremely horrific", and announced a compensation of ₹2 lakh (US$2,100) to next of kin of each person that died and ₹50,000 (US$520) for the injured. Arvind Kejriwal, the chief minister of state, reached on site to make overall assessment, and announced a compensation of ₹10 lakh (US$10,000) to next of kin of each person that died and ₹1 lakh (US$1,000) for the injured. Manoj Tiwari, Bharatiya Janta Party state president, announced a compensation of ₹5 lakh (US$5,200) to the next of kin of each person that died and ₹25,000 (US$260) to those who were injured.

Fireman Rajesh Shukla was praised by the state Home Minister Satyendra Jain for rescuing 11 people. Shukla was an early responder and entered the building to rescue people without waiting for backup to arrive. He suffered bone injuries and was admitted to LNJP Hospital for treatment.
