= 2020 Punjab alcohol poisoning =

Alcohol poisoning incident

- Date: 29 July 2020
- Location: Punjab, India
- Deaths: 121
- Arrests: 54

The 2020 Punjab alcohol poisoning was an incident in late July and early August 2020, where at least 100 people died after drinking illegally-made toxic alcohol in Punjab, India. Hundreds of raids were conducted in the three affected districts - Amritsar, Gurdaspur and Tarn Taran - along with several other places in and around the Rajpura and Shambhu border in Punjab. Forty people were arrested in relation to the incident. Seven excise officials, six policemen were also suspended over the incident.

== Background ==
=== Prevalence of alcohol in Punjab ===
Drinking in India has always existed since the Vedic age. According to a World Health Organisation (WHO) report, which revealed that more than 11% of Indians were binge drinkers. In Punjab, the number of people drinking far exceeds the average in India. It is surprising that more than half of Punjabi men drink alcohol and the state also houses the highest proportion of children consuming alcohol. The reasons why this phenomenon is so prevalent are that Punjabi's hold much pride and honour in their family name, they don't want to be seen as having a problem or as being weak, and alcohol is the one thing that helps them deal with everyday life.

=== Reasons for the making and drinking of toxic alcohol ===
The WHO reckons that "unrecorded" alcohol makes up more than half of all alcohol consumed in India. Locally brewed liquor, for example, is not recorded or taxed in some states. A survey by the International Alliance of Responsible Drinking in 2014 found a large number of drinkers preferring country liquor or homemade alcohol, often counterfeit and contraband.

One reason why illegal liquor is so popular is the huge unfulfilled demand for alcohol, which drives supply underground into an unregulated industry. India is the second biggest consumer of alcohol in the world, nearly one in every two bottles of whiskey brought around the world is sold there. Because of the difference in the prices of IMFL liquor and illegal liquor, to limit consumption, many state governments impose excessive taxes on alcohol sales. The state controls the alcohol industry in India, where the poor cannot afford licensed trademarks in government stores, but illegal liquor made in backstreet distilleries that sells for just 10 cents a litre, affordable even for the poorest.

== Investigation ==
The initial investigation revealed that the liquor contained methanol. A Ludhiana-based paint store owner, allegedly responsible for the toxic liquor deaths revealed that he supplied the three drums of methanol, which were used to make the illegal methanol-based alcohol.

== Response by the government ==
=== To criminals ===
According to The Indian Express, the property of the culprits will be confiscated and the Amarinder Singh government proposed the death penalty for manufacturers and suppliers of spurious liquor.

==== Rajeev Joshi ====
Rajeev Joshi was responsible for the case of alcohol poisoning in Punjab. He was procuring various types of alcohol and spirits from Punjab and Delhi and this time supplied the three drums of methanol, which were used to make the spurious methanol-based alcohol. He was arrested late on 3 August.

==== Ravinder Singh Anand ====
Ravinder Singh Anand of Moga had bought three cans of spurious liquor from the Ludhiana businessman. He was arrested before 3 August.

==== Jaswant Singh and Balwinder Kaur ====
Jaswant and Balwinder have been notorious for the production and sale of spurious liquor. Jaswant Singh died after consuming his own distillate. Balwinder Kaur was arrested before 4 August.

==== Harjit Singh and Shamsher Singh ====
Harjit Singh and Shamsher Singh are two key absconders of father-son duo from Pandori Golain in the hooch tragedy. They were arrested on 7 August.

==== Other criminals ====
The number of arrests in the case had gone up to 40 as of 4 August, and it had increased to 54 by 26 August.

=== To officials ===
The state government suspended seven excise officials and sic police officials before 1 August.

=== To victims ===
On 1 August, the government announced a compensation of ₹200,000 (₹2 lakh) for each of the families of the deceased.

On 7 August, Chief Minister Amarinder Singh announced an increase in the compensation from ₹2 lakh to ₹5 lakh to the kin of the deceased. He also announced a relief of ₹5 lakh to those who survived the tragedy but lost their eyesight.

Besides, Amarinder Singh handed over a cheque of ₹29,200,000 (₹2.92 crore) for 92 victim families of Tarn Taran to the deputy commissioner.

== Poisioning ==
In late July and early August 2020, 80 deaths were reported in Tarn Taran district alone, followed by 12 from Amritsar and 11 from Gurdaspur's Batala in Punjab, India due to toxic alcohol poisoning. The first deaths were reported in Amritsar district's Muchhal village on the night of 29 July 2020. By 31 July 2020, the Punjab state had reported 39 deaths. By 3 August, the death toll from poisoning linked to toxic liquor rose to 105.

The number of dead reached 121 on 7 August, which included 92 from Tarn Taran district, 15 from in Amritsar district and 14 from Gurdaspur district.

== Local and international criticisms ==
=== Local criticisms ===
Although the government had made a series of responses shortly, problems have not been solved from the root causes. There are some criticisms from the local congress and other parties. After a few days of this tragedy, two Congress Rajya Sabha MPs had condemned their party, and criticizing Amarinder Singh's responses was a "clear-cut failure". In addition, Bishop Agnelo Rufino Gracias is the auxiliary bishop emeritus of Bombay and apostolic administrator of Jalandhar Diocese. In a report in UCA News, He said, "It's a tragedy that could have easily been avoided without relevant authorities being alert. It is a manufactured tragedy". As we can see, the handling of the matter by the local government was highly controversial. Moreover, the opposite Aam Aadmi Party (AAP) had held several local protests, criticising the government's indifference to the plight of the people. And its malfeasance in causing the alcohol poisoning, of which most of the victims were the poor population.

=== International criticisms ===
Since 1992, an average of around 1,000 people have died from drinking alcohol illegally, which has caused much international concern. The Guardian UK reported in 2019 on a similar tragic incident in India, in which 200 people died. It also presented that the danger of that type of fake alcohol was the addition of formaldehyde to it by unscrupulous traders. Despite many reports on local and international news platforms, hopefully serving as a warning to the people, it did not prevent the disaster in Punjab 2020. In addition, Chinese Journalists analyzed the reasons for recurrence incidents. The Indian government passed a bill act in 2009 to prevent illegal alcohol. However, the situation still has not improved. The journalist pointed out two ways to solve this problem: for the Indian government to open up the alcohol license and lower taxes to reduce the price of wine.
