= Delhi Fire Service =

Government fire service in India

Delhi Fire Service दिल्ली अग्निशमन सेवा
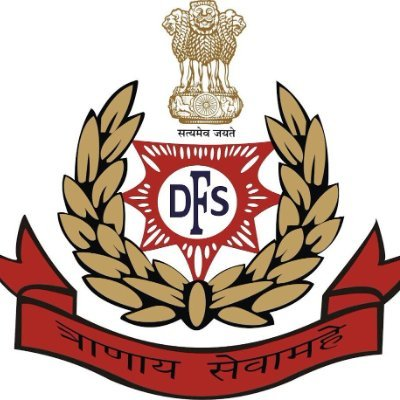

Agency overview
- Established: 1942
- Annual budget: ₹14,933.47 lacs
- Fire chief: Sh. Atul Garg
- Motto: We Serve to Save

Facilities and equipment
- Stations: 66
- Trucks: 198
- Rescues: 3

Delhi Fire Service (DFS) is the state-owned service that attends fire/rescue calls in the National Capital Territory of Delhi in India. The service consists of 66 fire stations and 3616 personnel (3280 firefighters, 289 mechanics), and attends to approximetal 30,000 fire and rescue calls on an average every year. The administrative control of The Delhi Fire Service rests with the Government of National Capital Territory of Delhi. The average number of fire/rescue calls attended by DFS is much more than any other metropolitan fire services in India.

== Zones ==
Delhi is divided into 3 zones with 2 geographical divisions within each:

- New Delhi Fire Zone - East Division and Central Divisions
- South Fire Zone - South Division and South West Divisions
- West Fire Zone - West Division and North West Divisions

== Command ==
- Director of Fire Services - 1
- Chief Fire Officer - 5
- Deputy Chief Fire Officers - 5
- Divisional Officers - 9
- Assistant Divisional Officers - 24

The department reports to Principal Secretary (Home)for the Government of NCT of Delhi.

== Ranks ==
Rank / Designation	Notes
Principal Director	Head of department; IAS cadre officer
Director	
Chief Fire Officer	Highest ranking uniformed employee.
Deputy Chief Fire Officer	
Divisional Officer	
Assistant Divisional Officer	
Station Officer	Officer incharge of a fire station
Sub-Officer / Sub-Officer (Driver)	
Leading Fireman	
Fireman / Fire Operator	

== Notable incidents ==
The Delhi Fire Service has responded to several major fire incidents in the city. In December 2019, a fire at a factory in Anaj Mandi killed 43 people, one of the deadliest fires in Delhi's history. In May 2022, a fire at a commercial building in Mundka killed 27 people. In June 2026, a fire at the Flourish Stay B&B hotel in Malviya Nagar killed 22 people, including several foreign nationals who were family members of patients at a nearby hospital. The building was reported to be operating with more rooms than its licensed capacity.
