= 2019 Delhi hotel fire =

Conflagration in India

Delhi hotel fire
- Date: 12 February 2019
- Venue: Hotel Arpit Palace
- Location: 28.646°N 77.190°E
- Cause: suspected short-circuit in an air conditioner
- Deaths: 17

A fire began at a budget hotel in Central Delhi, the Hotel Arpit Palace, in the Karol Bagh area of the city, at around 4:30 am on 12 February 2019, killing at least 17 people. The fire went through all floors of the hotel; people were seen jumping from it.

== Background ==
Poorly enforced regulations lead to thousands of deaths in fires across India every year. The city of Delhi has only around 1,700 firefighters. For comparison, New York City has eight times as many firefighters, but has less than half of Delhi's population. The Hotel Arpit Palace passed a fire safety check in December 2017.

== Fire ==
It was reported by the Chief Fire Officer of the Delhi Fire Services that the fire had broken out between 3 and 3:30 am, and that fire services were not alerted immediately. The first call to the police control room was received at 4:43 am. The fire quickly spread due to wooden panels on the walls and floor of the hotel, and caused heavy smoke in the hallways. Many guests attempted to avoid the smoke by staying in their rooms, but could not escape from the rooms as the windows were locked with a complicated latch system.

There were 60 guests staying in 35 of the 46 rooms of the hotel, and about a dozen staffers the night of the fire. At least 30 people were rescued by firefighters, but 17 succumbed to burns or asphyxiation, although three people; a woman from Myanmar, an IRS officer and a cook at the hotel jumped to escape, only the woman survived.

== Aftermath ==
The Delhi Police utilized 3D laser technology to recreate the scene of the hotel before the fire broke out in order to understand what led to the blaze and find violations by the hotel staff. They reviewed certificates issued to more than 1,500 hotels in India's tourist hubs in an effort to limit the number of casualties.

The First Information Report (FIR) listed six lapses inside the hotel, and highlighted that the business and the licensees and the management of the hotel had ignored the safety of its guests. Issues noted were no panic alarm on any of the floors or in the restaurants, only one emergency exit that was locked, and no proper signage to guide the guests to the emergency exit. It also noted that the extensive use of plastic and other inflammable material on the walls and partitions and a temporary structure erected on the roof led to quick spread of smoke and fire to quickly spread.

== See also ==
- 2026 Delhi hotel fire
