= Visakhapatnam gas leak =

2020 gas leak incident in Visakhapatnam, India

- Date: 7 May 2020
- Time: 3:00 a.m. IST (21:30 UTC+05:30)
- Location: R. R. Venkatapuram, Visakhapatnam district, Andhra Pradesh, India; 17°45′19″N 83°12′32″E
- Cause: Malfunction in the cooling system of styrene storage tanks (suspected)
- Deaths: 13
- Injuries: 1,000+

The Visakhapatnam gas leak, also referred to as the Vizag gas leak, was an industrial accident involving a styrene gas leak that occurred at the LG Polymers chemical plant in the R. R. Venkatapuram village of the Gopalapatnam neighbourhood, located at the outskirts of Visakhapatnam, Andhra Pradesh, India, during the early morning of 7 May 2020. The resulting vapour cloud spread over a radius of around 3.0 km (1.9 mi), affecting the nearby areas and villages. As per the National Disaster Response Force (NDRF), the death toll was 13, and more than 1,000 people became sick after being exposed to the gas.

Preliminary investigations concluded that the accident was likely the result of insufficient maintenance of units storing the styrene monomer, improper storage, and operation errors. The Government of Andhra Pradesh announced an ex gratia of ₹1 crore (US$100,000 or €92,000) for each family of the deceased, as well as funds for the injured. A budget of ₹30 crore (US$3.1 million or €2.7 million) was allocated for the compensation of all those affected.

== Background ==
The chemical plant of the R. R. Venkatapuram village was originally established in 1961 as Hindustan Polymers. In 1978, it was merged with McDowell Holdings, a subsidiary of United Breweries Group. In 1997, it was acquired by the South Korean company LG Chem, which renamed the company to LG Polymers India. LG Chem expanded its operations at the LG Polymers plant five times between 2006 and 2018. The plant manufactures polystyrene, co-polymer products, and engineering plastic compounds.

=== Lack of environment clearance ===
The South Korean parent company, LG Chem, said in its May 2019 affidavit, a part of an application for environment clearance, that the company did not have a legitimate environmental clearance issued by the Ministry of Environment, Forest and Climate Change (MoEFCC), after receiving an Environmental Impact Assessment (EIA), substantiating the produced quantity and for continuing operations. According to the EIA notification (amendment) of 2006 under the Environment Protection Act of 1986, LG Chemicals India, which is part of the petrochemical industry, falls into the category 'A' and should get clearance from the MoEFCC every time they expanded their plant or brought a change to their manufactured product after November 2006. LG Chem expanded its operations at LG Polymers plant five times between 2006 and 2018 without such clearance. According to the May 2019 affidavit, since 1997, it was instead operating with state permits required for starting a new business with renewals every five years.

However, LG Chem spokesperson Choi Sang-kyu told the Associated Press (AP) that the company had followed Indian laws and operated based on the officials' guidelines at the state and federal level. He said that the affidavit was a pledge of compliance with the law, rather than an admission of violating the law. After the 2006 notification, Choi said that the company consulted the ministry and was told that no clearance was required. However, Environment Secretary C. K. Mishra told the AP that the plant would have no requirement of clearance in 2006, but a clearance was imperative for any expansion or production change thereafter.

LG Polymers had never asked for a federal clearance until 2017, and as per the minutes of a meeting between the company and the Andhra Pradesh Pollution Control Board, the latter denied the former's request for producing engineering plastics at its plant. However, a member of the state pollution board said there was no information regarding any order by the state government to stop the plant's operation. In 2018, the company applied for an environmental clearance for the first time, to expand its manufacturing capacity of polystyrene, a plastic used to make bottles and lids. The Environment Ministry sent the application for a review citing that the company did not have a clearance for the chemicals it was already manufacturing. The company withdrew the application while applying for a retroactive clearance that the ministry offered to companies in 2018 as a one-time amnesty, which remained pending until the fatal leak occurred.

According to the AP, officials and legal experts like Mahesh Chandra Mehta, an environment lawyer, indicated that the plant seemed to be operating in a legal grey area, with the environmental clearance required under central regulations while the state executives are to look after the enforcement. However, to date there is no indication that the lack of environment clearance played a role in the disaster. Experts are also skeptical, as the plant operated for years without any clearance. Mehta also pointed out that many such industries are operating without a clearance, which shows how weak the environmental laws are in India that has to its credit several of the world's most polluted cities. Mehta also said that each time the company renewed that permit, the state pollution board, which has the power to enforce federal environmental law, would have been able to fine the company or deny a permit until it received federal clearance, which it never did. Dr. B. Sengupta, environmental scientist and former head of Central Pollution Control Board (CPCB), said that the state permits only consider pollution and do not consider the site safety. In contrast, federal clearance assesses risks concerning the handling and storage of hazardous materials, prevention of potential disasters, and mitigation in cases of disaster.

== Leakage and effects ==
=== Facilities and leakage ===
The plant was re-opened on 7 May 2020 following the nationwide lockdown implemented as a response to the COVID-19 pandemic. The plant stored 2,000 metric tons (1,968 long tons; 2,205 short tons) of styrene in tanks, which were left unattended. Styrene monomer must be stored between 20–22 °C (68–72 °F) because higher temperatures result in rapid vaporization. It is believed that a computer glitch in the factory's cooling system allowed temperatures in the storage tanks to exceed safe levels, causing the styrene to vaporize. Between 2:30 a.m. and 3:00 a.m., when maintenance activity was in progress, the gas leaked from the plant and spread to nearby villages.

=== Acute effects ===
The fumes spread over a radius of 3km (1.86 mi). Five villages (R. R. Venkatapuram including Ajanta Park Colony, Padmapuram, BC Colony, Gopalapatnam, and Kamparapalem) were the most affected areas. Hundreds of people were rushed to hospitals following widespread breathing difficulties and sensations of burning eyes. Many had been found lying on the ground, unconscious as a result of gas exposure. The initial estimate noted at least 11 deaths and 20–25 people in critical condition. By the next day, the death toll had risen to thirteen. More than 1,000 people were reportedly exposed to the gas.

Late at night on 7 May, police ordered the evacuation of people in a 2 km (1.2 mi) radius of the leak. However, police subsequently stated that this evacuation was precautionary and that there had not been a second leak.

== Probable leakage and removal of chemicals ==
Experts from the central government who inspected the plant said that it would have faced a catastrophe had the violation of safety norms at other storage facilities of the plant gone unnoticed for a few more days. They said those facilities were vulnerable to a leak of vapour on a larger scale and stored in a high-risk condition. An expert said polymerization was noticed in another storage.

According to Deccan Chronicle, two experts from the National Disaster Management Authority (NDMA), Dr. Anjan Ray, director of the Indian Institute of Petroleum, and Shantanu Geete, an industry expert, inspected the storage facilities of the plant, as well as the Vizag port. Dr. Ray, an expert in styrene, recommended that the government immediately remove the materials from the facility. On 11 May 2020, the Andhra Pradesh government directed the company to remove 13,000 metric tonnes (MT) of material out of the country. With the Ministry of Shipping's help, the state government arranged two vessels to carry the load, split into portions of 8,000 MT and 5,000 MT, to the company's headquarter in Seoul.

Mekapati Goutham Reddy, minister of industries of Andhra Pradesh, said that the preliminary conclusion from the experts' inspections was that the storage facilities were not designed to keep the material for a long duration. However, the plant personnel claimed that the material was emptied every 10 to 15 days and never stored more than the assigned period.

== Relief and rescue ==
Nearly 200-250 families were evacuated from villages in a five-kilometre (3.1 mi) radius around the plant. About 300 people were hospitalized, according to a media report. The Chief Minister of Andhra Pradesh, Y. S. Jaganmohan Reddy, announced an ex gratia of ₹1 crore (US$100,000) for each family of those killed as a result of the accident. He also announced ₹25,000 (US$260) for those who received primary treatment, ₹1 lakh (US$1,000) for those who received longer treatment, and ₹1 million (US$10,000) for those on ventilator support.

To prevent further dangerous polymerization and self-heating of the styrene, 500 kilograms (1,100 lb) of the polymerization inhibitor 4-tert-butylcatechol (PTBC) was airlifted by the Government of Andhra Pradesh and sent to the crippled factory. Additionally, the central government flew in a National Disaster Response Force (NDRF) specialized CBRN (chemical, biological, radiological, and nuclear) team from Pune to the site.

== Remedial measures by LG ==
LG Chemicals started support measures to eliminate all risk factors in the plant. In its effort, LG brought ACtify 2680, a green retarder, and ACtify 2673, a polymerisation inhibitor, from Dorf Ketal Chemicals, a Mumbai-based chemical company. To ensure the site's safety, LG said the retarder and inhibitor would be added into the tanks of the styrene stored at LG Polymers to prevent further polymerization and any future vapor leaks. The ACtify series retarder is a new green polymer retardant that displays thermal stability and protection during unscheduled shutdowns.

On 13 May 2020, the LG Chemicals informed media that an eight-member technical team, comprising experts from its Seoul headquarters' departments of production, environment, and safety were sent to investigate the incident and to rehabilitate the victims. LG Polymers India said the team would take prompt rehabilitation and real-time remedial measures. They would meet the victims and affected families to explain support measures in detail and hold meetings with the local State government officials.

== Investigation ==
According to the preliminary investigation, a gas valve malfunction is believed to have caused the leak. The leak was from one of two chemical tanks that had been left unattended since March 2020 due to the COVID-19 lockdown. The malfunctioning of the tank's refrigerating unit led to an increase in temperature, causing the liquid chemical, suspected to be styrene, to evaporate. However, experts have claimed that other chemicals may have also leaked, as styrene is unlikely to spread over 4 to 5 kilometres (2 1/2 to 3 mi) due to its chemical properties.

=== Legal actions ===
As part of the police investigation following the leak, a first information report (FIR) was filed against LG Polymers by the local police. The report allowed for possible charges under sections 278 (making the atmosphere noxious to health), 284 (negligent conduct with respect to poisonous substance), 285 (negligent conduct with respect to fire or combustible matter), 337 (causing hurt by act endangering life or personal safety of others), 338 (causing grievous hurt by act endangering life), and 304 (causing death by doing any rash or negligent act not amounting to culpable homicide) of the Indian Penal Code (IPC).

==== National Green Tribunal ====
A petition was filed in the National Green Tribunal (NGT), India's top environmental court, demanding an investigation into the incident by a high-level committee. A bench headed by the NGT chair, Justice Adarsh Kumar Goel, was formed, and the case was scheduled to be heard on 8 May 2020.

On 8 May, the bench ordered LG Polymers India to deposit an amount of ₹50 crore (US$5.2 million) as an initial amount with the District magistrate of Vishakapatnam to mitigate the damages caused due to the incident. It issued notices to the Andhra Pradesh Pollution Control Board (APPCB), the Central Pollution Control Board (CPCB) and the Union Ministry of Environment, Forest and Climate Change (MOEFCC), in which it sought the responses of the individual boards and the ministry. It also constituted a five-member fact-finding committee to probe the incident and to deliver a report to the bench. The committee would be supervised by former Andhra Pradesh High Court judge, B. Seshasayana Reddy.

The report of the high-level committee headed by the NGT chair issued on 28 May 2020, accessed and reviewed by The Associated Press, found that the storage tanks were outdated and lacked temperature sensors, allowing the styrene vaporization to go undetected. With factory workers and the overall company inexperienced in storing tanks of such dangerous chemicals, the report blamed the incident on "gross human failure" and a lack of basic safety norms.

==== Human Rights Commission ====
The same day as the incident, the National Human Rights Commission of India (NHRC) gave notice to the Andhra Pradesh Government and the central government that it considered the incident a gross violation of India's constitutional right to life. In their notice, the NHRC was seeking a detailed report from the Andhra Pradesh Government on rescue operations, medical treatment, and rehabilitation. It also asked the Union Ministry of Corporate Affairs to investigate any possible breaches of workplace health and safety law. Both reports are expected to be delivered within four weeks.

== See also ==
- 2020 Assam gas and oil leak
- 2022 Surat gas leak
- Bhopal disaster
- System accident

== Bibliography ==
- The Vizag gas leak is the most recent of human disasters with the potential to change our lives forever by The Business Insider
