= 2018 in India =

- Centuries: 19th; 20th; 21st
- Decades: 1990s; 2000s; 2010s; 2020s
- See also: List of years in India; Timeline of Indian history

Events in the year 2018 in the Republic of India.

== Government of India ==
=== Central government ===
Photo	Post	Name
	President of India	Ram Nath Kovind
	Vice-President of India Chairman of Rajya Sabha	Venkaiah Naidu
	Prime Minister of India	Narendra Modi
	Chief Justice of India	Ranjan Gogoi
	Speaker of the Lok Sabha	Sumitra Mahajan
	Chief Election Commissioner of India	Sunil Arora

=== State governments ===
State	Governor	Chief Minister	Chief Justice
Andhra Pradesh	E.S.L Narasimhan	Nara Chandra Babu Naidu	Ranganathan(Hyderabad High Court)
Arunachal Pradesh	B. D. Mishra	Pema Khandu	Ajit Singh (Gauhati High Court)
Assam	Jagdish Mukhi	Sarbananda Sonowal	Ajit Singh (Gauhati High Court)
Bihar	Lalji Tandon	Nitish Kumar	Rajendra Menon (Patna High Court)
Chhattisgarh	Anandiben Patel	Bhupesh Baghel	T. B Radhakrishnan
Goa	Mridula Sinha	Manohar Parrikar	Manjula Chellur
Gujarat	Om Prakash Kohli	Vijay Rupani	R. Subhash Reddy
Haryana	Kaptan Singh Solanki	Manohar Lal Khattar	Shiavax Jal Vazifdar
Himachal Pradesh	Acharya Dev Vrat	Jai Ram Thakur	Sanjay Karol (Acting)
Jammu and Kashmir	Satyapal Malik	president's rule	Badar Durrez Ahmed
Jharkhand	Draupadi Murmu	Raghubar Das	Dhirubhai N. Patel (Acting)
Karnataka	Vajubhai Vala	H.D.Kumaraswamy	H. G. Ramesh (Acting)
Kerala	P. Sathasivam	Pinarayi Vijayan	Antony Dominic (Acting)
Madhya Pradesh	Om Prakash Kohli (Additional charge)	Kamal Nath	Hemant Gupta
Maharashtra	Bhagat Singh	Devendra Fadnavis	Manjula Chellur
Manipur	Najma Heptulla	N. Biren Singh	N. Kotiswar Singh (Acting)
Meghalaya	Ganga Prasad	Mukul Sangma	Dinesh Maheshwari
Mizoram	Nirbhay Sharma	Zoramthanga	Ajit Singh
Nagaland	Padmanabha Acharya	Neiphiu Rio	Ajit Singh
Odisha	Ganeshi Lal	Naveen Patnaik	Vineet Saran
Punjab	V. P. Singh Badnore	Amarinder Singh	Shiavax Jal Vazifdar
Rajasthan	Kalyan Singh	Vasundhara Raje	Pradeep Nandrajog
Sikkim	Shriniwas Patil	Pawan Kumar Chamling	Satish K. Agnihotri
Tamil Nadu	Banwarilal Purohit	Edappadi K. Palaniswami	Indira Banerjee
Telangana	E. S. L. Narasimhan (Additional charge)	K. Chandrashekar Rao	Ramesh Ranganathan (Acting)
Tripura	Tathagata Roy	Biplab Kumar Deb	Tinlianthang Vaiphei
Uttar Pradesh	Ram Naik	Yogi Adityanath	Dilip Babasaheb Bhosale
Uttarakhand	Krishan Kant Paul	Trivendra Singh Rawat	K. M. Joseph
West Bengal	Keshari Nath Tripathi	Mamata Banerjee	Jyotirmay Bhattacharya (Acting)

== Elections ==
Following elections were scheduled to take place in various states of the country

- 2018 Meghalaya Legislative Assembly election
- 2018 Nagaland Legislative Assembly election
- 2018 Mizoram Legislative Assembly election
- 2018 Madhya Pradesh Legislative Assembly election
- 2018 Chhattisgarh Legislative Assembly election
- 2018 Rajasthan Legislative Assembly election
- 2018 Karnataka Legislative Assembly election
- 2018 Telangana Legislative Assembly election

== Events ==
- National income - ₹188,869,569 million

=== January - March ===
- January 1 -
  - Delhi was engulfed in the worst fog of the season, with visibility dropping to zero. Flight and train services were disrupted.
  - The state of Telangana started providing round-the-clock uninterrupted free power supply to 2.3 million agricultural consumers, becoming the first state in the country to do so.
  - One dead after clashes broke out between Dalits and Marathas in Maharashtra during the celebration of 1818 victory of British Indian troops over Baji Rao II at Koregaon Bhima village. Schools and colleges in Mumbai were shut after the violence spread to the city. Riot police were called in to control the violence. The flames of riots were spread all over Maharashtra, people violating public property and stone pelting. Army, Police Force was called out. Article 144 was imposed in many regions of the state. (2018 Bhima Koregaon violence)
- January 2 -
  - 290,000 doctors across the country participated in a strike for 12 hours to protest against the National Medical Commission Bill, which seeks to replace the Medical Council of India with National Medical Commission. The Strike was called off mid-way as the government agrees to send the bill to Parliamentary standing committee.
  - Finance Minister Arun Jaitley informed the Parliament that crypto-currencies like Bitcoin are not legal tender in the country, as they are not backed by the sovereign. The government has earlier cautioned people not to invest in crypto-currencies, terming them ponzi schemes.
- January 5 - Central Statistics Office estimates GDP Growth at 6.5% for the 2017–18 financial year, compared to 7.1% for the previous year. The estimates quote the effects of GST transition and agrarian distress for the slowest growth in four years and forecast growth to pick up in the next year.
- January 6 -
  - 4 policemen killed in an IED blast aimed at a patrol unit in Sopore, Jammu and Kashmir.
  - A CBI court sentenced RJD chief Lalu Prasad Yadav to three and half-year jail term, convicting 7 others in the Fodder Scam case in Bihar.
- January 6–11 people died in an avalanche in Kupwara district of Jammu and Kashmir.
- January 8 - Law minister Ravi Shankar Prasad states that the government was committed to freedom of the press, amid criticism of press censorship after UIDAI filed an FIR against a journalist of The Tribune for exposing illegal data access to Aadhaar database.
- January 9 - Supreme Court of India made playing the National Anthem of India in movie halls not mandatory, reversing its earlier order after the Indian Central Government opposed the move and formed a committee to form guidelines about the issue.
- January 10 - January 17-Kathua rape and murder case.
- January 12 -
  - Indian Space Research Organisation places 31 satellites in orbit through its launch vehicle Polar Satellite Launch Vehicle including a Cartosat-2 series satellite. The launch comes four months after the failure of a PSLV launch.
  - In an unprecedented move, four senior-most judges of Supreme Court of India expressed public displeasure over the functioning of the Chief Justice of India Dipak Misra and call for his impeachment.
- January 15 - Government of India abolishes Haj subsidy.
- January 19 - Bellandur Lake, a heavily polluted lake in Bangalore city caught fire and burned for nearly 30 hours.
- January 20 - India won 2018 Blind Cricket World Cup.
- January 21 - President suspended the membership of Vidhan Sabha of 20 MLAs of Delhi Government under the Office of Profit.
- January 26 -
  - Kasganj violence in Uttar Pradesh
  - Pakki encounter by Punjab Police
- February 3 - Attacks on Uttar Pradeshi and Bihari migrants in Maharashtra following clashes between workers of Maharashtra Navnirman Sena and Samajwadi Party at Dadar.
- March 5 - A statue of Vladimir Lenin knocked down in Belonia, Tripura following end of 25 year long Communist Party of India (Marxist) rule in the state.
- March 12 - Kisan Long March, Maharashtra reached Mumbai. Nearly 30,000 farmers under the aegis of All India Kisan Sabha marched to Mumbai for loan waiver and implementation of M. S. Swaminathan Commission recommendations.

=== April - June ===
- April 2 - April 2018 caste protests in India
- April 7 - 2018 Tamil Nadu protests for Kaveri water sharing
- April 11 - IRNSS-1I successfully launched from Satish Dhawan Space Centre.
- May 22 - Thoothukudi violence
- Indian WhatsApp lynchings
- June 8 - 2018 Karbi Anglong lynching taken place due to Fake news spread through WhatsApp.
- June 20 – Government report warns that in 21 cities groundwater will run out by the year 2020.

=== July - September ===
- July 1 - Burari deaths in Delhi.
- July 13 - Enforcement Directorate files its first charge sheet in 2013 Vyapam scam against alleged master mind Dr. Jagadish Sagar.
- July 20 - Prime Minister, Narendra Modi wins a no confidence motion in the Lok Sabha moved by the Telugu Desam Party over the non-allocation of enough funds to the state of Andhra Pradesh.
- August 10–20 – Heavy rainfall causes the 2018 Kerala floods. It was the worst flood to hit the state in a century.
- August 16 – Former prime minister Atal Bihari Vajpayee dies at 93. He was the first Indian prime minister who was not a member of the Indian National Congress party to have served a full five-year term in office.
- Sept 6 - A five judge bench of Supreme Court of India unanimously decriminalized Section 377 of Indian Penal Code which criminalize Homosexuality in Navtej Singh Johar v. Union of India case.
- Sept 14 - Infrastructure finance company IL&FS defaulted on payment obligations to lenders and failed to meet the commercial paper redemption obligations thereby triggering panic and liquidity crisis in the markets.
- Sept 28 -
  - Supreme Court of India allows entry of women to Sabarimala.
  - Attacks on Hindi-speaking migrants in Gujarat began following a rape at Himatnagar.

=== October - December ===
- October 10 – At least five people died and 30 were injured when a passenger train derailed in the north Indian state of Uttar Pradesh.
- October 19 - Amritsar train disaster
- October 25 to 27 – India Mobile Congress 2018, a 3 days event, was inaugurated by the Minister of State (independent charge) for Communications and Minister of State for Railways, Manoj Sinha, at Aerocity, New Delhi. The second edition of the iconic India Mobile Congress event saw the participation of 20 countries, 65000 visitors, 10000 delegates, 150 exhibitors, 300 international speakers and was supported by several ministries from the Government of India.
- October 31 - Prime Minister of India inaugurates world tallest statue, Statue of Unity at Gujarat.
- Nov 16 - Cyclone Gaja makes landfall near Nagapattinam.
- Nov 29 - Thousands of farmers under the leadership of All India Kisan Sangharsh Coordination Committee gather at Ramlila Maidan Delhi demanding Government of India debt relief and fair prices for their farm produce.
- Dec 9 - Kannur International Airport dedicated to the nation. It becomes the fourth International airport in Kerala.
- Dec 13 - 15 miners got trapped in a rat hole mine at East Jaintia Hills district.
- Dec 16 - In the 2018 Men's Hockey World Cup held at Odisha, Belgium emerged as champions.
- Dec 17 - Cyclone Phethai affects Coastal Andhra.
- Dec 21 - A special CBI court acquits all 22 accused in the Sohrabuddin Shaikh case.
- Dec 27 - At least 19 students die by suicide in Kota, Rajasthan in 2018.

== Sports ==
=== January ===
- Vidarbha beat Delhi by 9 wickets to win their maiden Ranji Trophy.
- Hyderabad Hunters defeat Bengaluru Blasters 4–3 to claim their maiden Premier Badminton League title.
- India national blind cricket team claimed the 2018 Blind Cricket World Cup title by defeating Pakistan in the finals by 2 wickets.
- Indian national cricket team won the ODI Series against South Africa in South Africa in first in History.

=== February ===
- India national under-19 cricket team won the 2018 Under-19 Cricket World Cup held in New Zealand beating Australia in the Final.

=== March ===
- Indian national cricket team won the 2018 Nidahas Trophy beating Bangladesh in Final.
- Chennaiyin FC became champions of Indian Super League for second time defeating Bengaluru FC in the final.
- Minerva Punjab FC became champions of I-League.

=== May ===
- Chennai Super Kings won the 2018 Indian Premier League beating Sunrisers Hyderabad in the Final.

=== June ===
- India hosts Afghanistan for their first-ever Test. India won by an innings and 62 runs.

=== July ===
- Indian national cricket team won T20I series against England in England for the first time in History

=== November ===
- 2018 Men's Hockey World Cup was scheduled to be held from November 28 to December 16 at Kalinga Stadium, Bhubaneswar.

=== December ===
India vs Australia test series 2018

In Men's Hockey World Cup 2018 Belgium won the tournament for the first time after defeating the Netherlands 3–2 in the final on a penalty shoot-out after a 0–0 draw. Defending champions Australia won the third place match by defeating England 8–1.[4]

== Publications ==
- “Republic of Caste” by Anand Teltumbde
- “The Billionaire Raj” by James Crabtree

== Deaths ==
=== January ===
- January 2 – Radha Viswanathan, vocalist and classical dancer, daughter of M. S. Subbulakshmi, 83
- January 4 – Ulhas Bapat, santoor player, 67
- January 6 – Kapil Mohan, entrepreneur, chairman and managing director of Mohan Meakin, 88
- January 6 – Baldev Raj, nuclear physicist, director of the Indira Gandhi Centre for Atomic Research, Kalpakkam, 70
- January 7 – Shrivallabh Vyas, Hindi film and television actor, 60
- January 7 – Saksham Yadav, former powerlifting world champion, 28
- January 12 – Doodhnath Singh, Hindi writer, critic and poet, 81
- January 14 – Satnam Singh Kainth, politician, former MLA from Banga Assembly Constituency, former MP from Phillaur, 56
- January 15 – Ava Mukherjee, film and television actress (Devdas, Detective Naani), 88
- January 15 – Buddhadev Das Gupta, sarod player, 84
- January 15 – Raghunath Jha, former Union minister of State for Heavy Industries and Public Enterprise in the First Manmohan Singh ministry, 78
- January 15 – Gnani Sankaran, journalist and writer in Tamil, 64
- January 16 – Geevarghese Divannasios Ottathengil, Indian Syro-Malankala Catholic prelate, Bishop of Bathery (1996–2010) and Puthur (2010–2017), 67
- January 18 – Kashinatha Hathwar, actor and director primarily in Kannada, 67
- January 18 – Chandi Lahiri, journalist, cartoonist at Anandabazar Patrika, 88
- January 19 – Sriniwas Tiwari, freedom fighter, Speaker of the Madhya Pradesh Legislative Assembly (1993–2003), 91
- January 20 – Hasmukh Patel, architect, 84
- January 26 – Supriya Devi, Bengali actress, 85
- January 30 – Chintaman Vanaga, politician and Member of Parliament from Palghar, 61

=== February ===
- February 11- Parbati Ghose, 85, Oriya film director
- February 24- Sridevi, Bollywood Actress, 54
- February 28 – Jagadguru Sri Jayendra Saraswathi Shankaracharya, 82, 69th Shankaracharya guru

=== March ===
- March 1 – Arabinda Muduli, 56, Indian musician and Bhajan singer
- March 2 – Khagendra Jamatia, 64, Indian politician
- March 4 – Javed Abidi, 53, Indian disability rights activist
- March 6 – Shammi, 87, actress
- March 6 – Indra Bahadur Rai, 91, Indian writer
- March 9 – Patangrao Kadam, 74, politician from Maharashtra, former Forest Minister in Maharashtra Government
- March 9 – Pyarelal Wadali, 75, Indian Sufi singer
- March 13 – Hamida Habibullah, 101, politician
- March 14 – Narendra Jha, 55, actor and singer
- March 19 – Kedarnath Singh, 83, poet
- March 27 – Gangadhar Pantawne, 81, writer

=== April ===
- April 2 – Bhai Vaidya, 89, veteran Socialist leader, former Home Minister of Maharashtra state
- April 3 – S. Madhavan, 84, politician
- April 4 – Raobail, 80, Indian cartoonist
- April 6 – Raj Kishore, 85, Indian actor
- April 7 – Munin Barua, 72, Indian film director
- April 12 – Naseem Mirza Changezi, 108, Indian independence activist
- April 14 – Ram Kumar, 94, Indian artist
- April 15 – Waqar Ahmad Shah, 74, Indian politician

=== May ===
- May 4 – BN Vijaya Kumar, 60, politician and MLA from Jayanagar, Karnataka
- May 6 – Arun Date, 84, Marathi singer
- May 11 – Anita Das, 66, Odia actress
- May 14 – E. C. George Sudarshan, 86, Indian theoretical physicist
- May 19 – Jivya Soma Mashe, 84, Indian Warli tribal artist
- May 31 – Pandurang Pundalik Fundkar, 67, Minister of Agriculture in Maharashtra government

=== June ===
- June 9 – Shantaram Naik, 72, politician, member of the Rajya Sabha (2005–2017)
- June 12
  - Ram Chander Bainda, 72, politician, member of the Lok Sabha
  - Bhaiyyu Maharaj, 50, spiritual guru
- June 14 – Shujaat Bukhari, 63, journalist (assassinated)

=== July ===
- July 9 – Kavi Kumar Azad, Actor in Tarak Mehta ka Ooltah Chashmah
- July 17 – Rita Bhaduri, 62, actress
- July 20 – Akhtar Raza Khan, 77, Indian Sunni Muslim scholar and mufti.
- July 19 – Gopal das neeraj, 93, Hindi poet

=== August ===
- August 7 – M. Karunanidhi, 94, former DMK chief and former chief minister of Tamil Nadu
- August 13 – Somnath Chatterjee, former MP and Speaker of Lok Sabha
- August 14 – Balram Das Tandon, Governor of Chhattisgarh, former Deputy Chief Minister of Punjab and former Member of the Bharatiya Jana Sangh
- August 14 – Chemmanam Chacko, 92, Malayalam poet
- August 15 – Ajit Wadekar, 77, cricketer
- August 16 – Atal Bihari Vajpayee, 93, former Prime Minister of India.
- August 22 – Gurudas Kamat, 63, politician, Minister of Communications and Information Technology in Government of India
- August 23 – Kuldip Nayar, 95, journalist, ex-High Commissioner of India to United Kingdom
- August 24 – Vijay Chavan, Marathi film and play actor

=== September ===
- September 17 – Captain Raju, 68, military officer and actor

=== October ===
- October 20 – N. D. Tiwari, 93, politician
- October 28 – Madan Lal Khurana, former Chief Minister of Delhi, Governor of Rajasthan

=== November ===
- November 12 – Ananth Kumar, 59, politician and minister
- November 27 – Mohammed Aziz, 64, playback singer

=== December ===
- December 17 – Brigadier Kuldeep Singh Chandpuri, 78, leader in Battle of Longewala, Maha Veer Chakra awardee.
- December 22- Danish Zehen, 24 contestant of ace of space Died in car accident
- December 24 – Dwijen Mukhopadhyay, 91, Bengali composer
- December 30 – Mrinal Sen, 95, Bengali filmmaker
- December 31 -
  - Kader Khan, 81, Indian actor
  - Simon Britto Rodrigues, 64, politician
