= India Mobile Congress 2018 =

International technology conference in India

- Genre: Digital technologies and Telecommunication
- Venue: Aerocity
- Locations: Aerocity, New Delhi
- Country: India
- Attendance: 65,000
- Organizer: COAI and DoT
- Website: www.indiamobilecongress.com

India Mobile Congress 2018 (IMC) was a technology event and international conference jointly organised by the Cellular Operators Association of India (COAI) and the Department of Telecommunications, Government of India. IMC 2018 was the second edition of the iconic India Mobile Congress event that is held annually in New Delhi, India. It was held at Aerocity, New Delhi from 25 October 2018 to 27 October 2018.

The main thrust area at IMC 2018 was the potential of 5G technology and its use cases. A number of companies presented their roadmaps for their readiness for deployment of 5G technology in India. The India Mobile Congress 2018 was awarded as "The Knowledge Hub" at Exhibition Excellence Awards 2019 held in Expo Center, Greater Noida in March 2019.

== Inauguration ==
The inauguration of IMC2018 took place on 25 October 2019, around 10am. The three-day international event was inaugurated by Manoj Sinha, Minister of State (Independent Charge) for Communications and Minister of State for Railways. A number of important industry stakeholders, ministers and experts attended the inaugural session, such as:

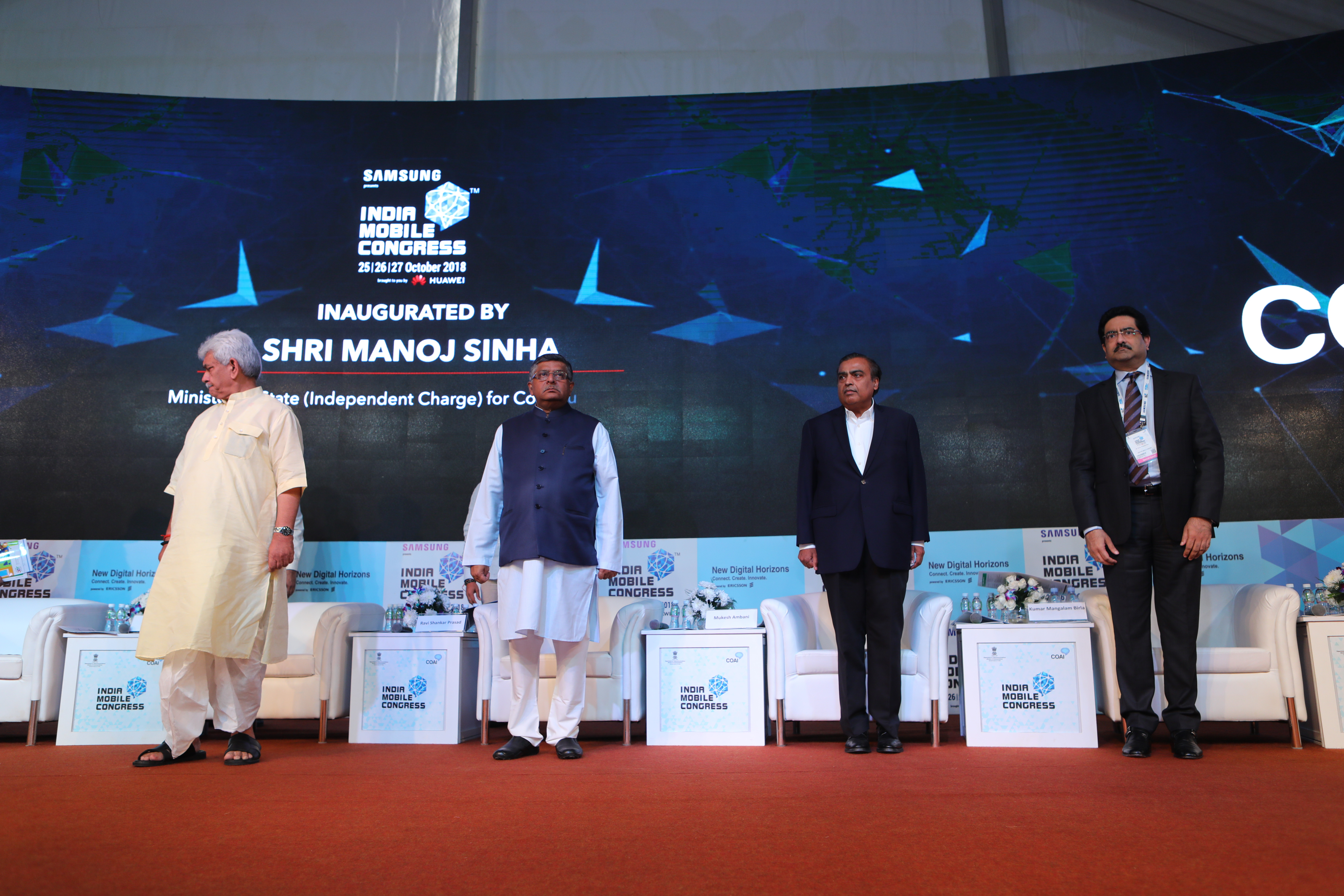
The who's who of the Indian Digital Communications Industry stand up for the National Anthem during the inaugural session.

=== Indian government officials ===
- Ravi Shankar Prasad, Minister of Electronics and Information Technology and Law & Justice
- Suresh Prabhu, Minister of Commerce & Industry and Civil Aviation
- Hardeep Singh Puri, Minister of State (Independent Charge) for Housing & Urban Affairs
- Aruna Sundararajan, Secretary (T) & Chairperson, Telecom Commission

=== International policy makers ===
- Tram Iv Tek, Minister of Posts & Telecommunications, Cambodia
- U Thant Sin Maung, Union Minister for Transportation & Communications, Myanmar;
- Bounsaleumsay Khennavong, Lao PDR; and
- H.E. Gokul Prasad Baskota, Minister for Communications and Information Technology, Nepal

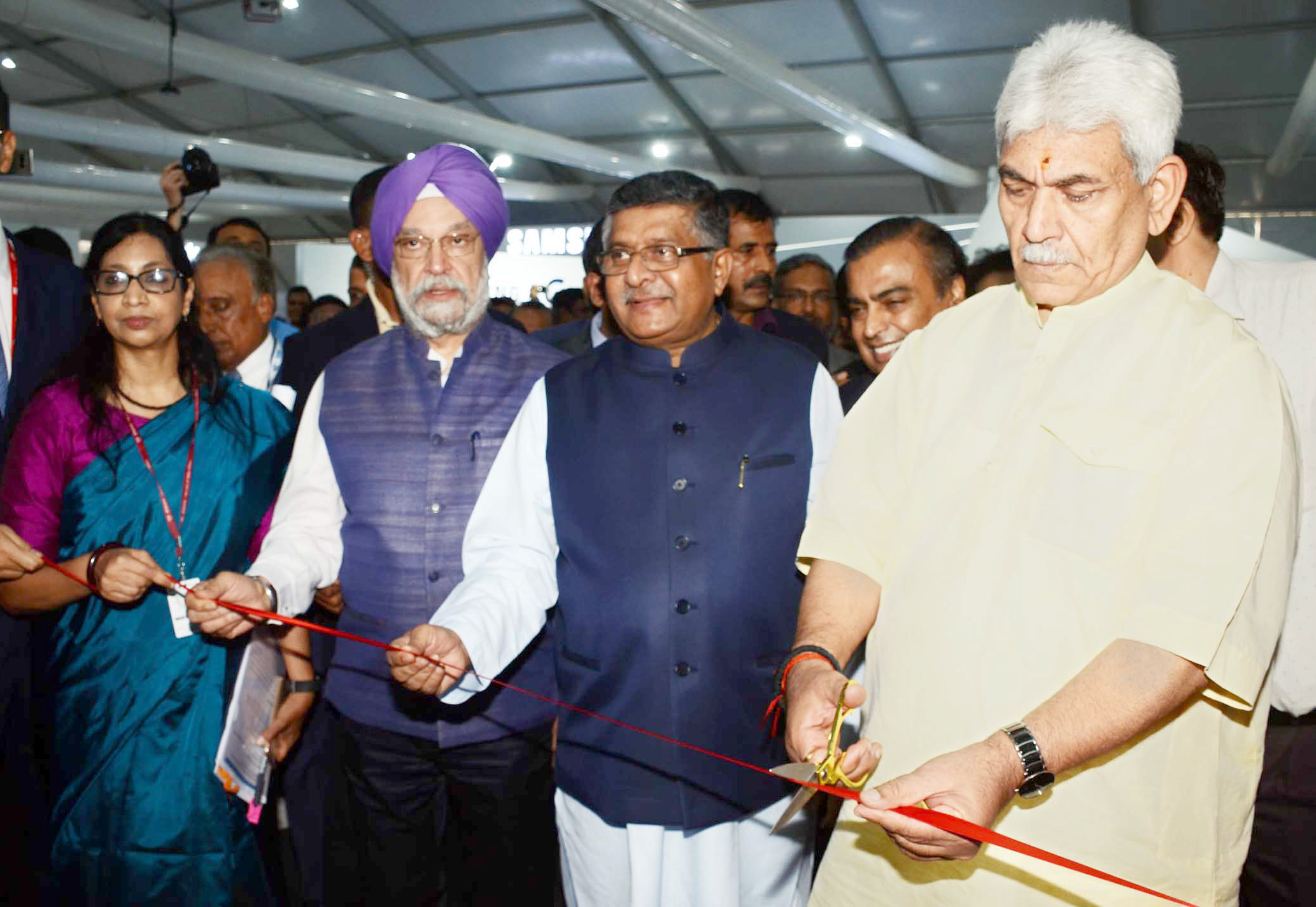
The Minister of State (Independent Charge) for Communications and the Minister of State for Railways, Manoj Sinha cutting the ribbon to inaugurate IMC 2018

=== Industry stakeholders ===
- Dr Youngky Kim, President and Head of Samsung Networks
- Vivek Badrinath, Regional CEO, Africa Middle East Asia Pacific, Vodafone Group
- Sunil Bharti Mittal, Founder and chairman, Bharti Enterprises
- Mukesh Ambani, chairman, Reliance Industries Limited
- Kumar Mangalam Birla, chairman, Aditya Birla Group

The crowd of over 5000 visitors for the inaugural ceremony included policy makers, ambassadors, opinion makers, change agents, bureaucrats and investors from over 20 countries.

== International conference ==
The high caliber three-day international conference is one of the main things that sets India Mobile Congress apart from other technology and telecom exhibitions in the region. IMC attracts the biggest and the most famous international speakers in the telecom and technology space and that makes it a popular choice for Indian and foreign delegates, including tech enthusiasts, young professionals, businessmen, industry leaders, analysts, media persons and students.

IMC 2019 also saw the presence of high-level ministerial delegations from several BIMSTEC and ASEAN countries. Ministers from the European Commission, Cambodia, Myanmar, Nepal, and Lao PDR led their respective delegations, and participated in plenary sessions that were focused on the specific needs, challenges, and opportunities applicable to member countries of these regional forums.

=== Theme ===
The theme for the 2018 edition of India Mobile Congress was "New Digital Horizons – Connect. Create. Innovate."

=== Sessions ===
Sessions	Sessions
The India Story (Stack 3.0) - Connect, Create, Innovate	Global CEO Conclave - Power of Content
The Evolving Regulatory Landscape in the New Digital Ecosystem-Regulatory Brief	Global CEO Conclave - Open Source Tech
Enabling Futuristic Networks - Reducing complexity to Redefine connectivity	Pro-Innovation Regulation and Privacy- Encouraging New Digital Business Models
Digital Identity - A revolution or a threat	The Emerging World of Analytics: Creating Business Solutions
Building Next-Gen Digital Infrastructure for the Masses	HealthTech - Age of Cyborgs
Gadgets of Tomorrow-Connected Intelligence	Value Creation through Digital Marketing
ASEAN & BIMSTEC Conclave	Artificial Intelligence: Innovation, Investments, Ethics and Responsibilities
Smart Cities: - Automating the way we live	Industry 4.0 : Building Factories of the Future
Enabling the IoT ecosystem - Shaping an Automated Society	Future of Enterprise - Serving the Millennials
Augmented & Virtual Reality - What does the future hold?	Special Plenary Session on 5G - Government Perspective
Make From India	Special Plenary Session on 5G - OEM Perspective
The Digital Natives - Transforming Technology and Content	Spectrum for Next Gen Technologies
Evolving network Models - Intelligent Transport	Driving Infinite Possibilities through Open Source Technology
RupeeTech ₹TECH - Is Cash still the King ?	Metrics for futuristic Networks
GuruGyan - Mentoring Session for Startups	Blockchaining Our Lives
Global CEO Conclave - Networks of Tomorrow	Cybersecurity as a Collective Responsibility - Defining the road ahead
Global CEO Conclave - Emerging Technologies	AgriTech : TechFARMERS

=== Top speakers ===
- Ajit Pai
- Andrus Ancip
- Johannes Gungl
- Kumar Mangalam Birla
- Mukesh Ambani
- R.S.Sharma
- Sunil Bharti Mittal
- Youngky Kim

== Exhibition ==
=== Event partners ===
There were a number of high-profile brands that partnered with IMC for the 2018 edition including Samsung, Huawei, Qualcomm, Tech Mahindra, Facebook, Google, and several others.

=== Top exhibitors ===
Accenture	Mavenir	Sterlite Technologies Limited
Anritsu India Pvt Ltd	Mediatek	TCIL (TEPC Pavilion)
BSNL	Mobiloitte Technologies India Pvt. Ltd.	TANLA
Canada Pavilion	NEC Technologies India Private Limited	Tata Communications + Semtech
C-DOT	Netcomm Labs Pvt. Ltd.	UK Pavilion
Commscope	Nokia	UNISOC
ECI Telecom	Qualcomm	UT Starcom
Ericsson	RED HAT India Pvt. Ltd.	Vodafone Idea Limited
Facebook	Reliance Jio	Western Digital
Huber+Suhner	Rosenberger Electronic Co.(India) Pvt. Ltd.	Z-com
Huawei Technologies	Samsung	Zoho Corporation Pvt. Ltd.
Intel	Savitri Telecom Private Limited	ZTE

=== List of start-ups ===
3Embed Software Technologies Pvt Ltd	Kratikal
Aarav Unmanned Systems	Linearized amplifier technologies and services Pvt.ltd.
Alef Mobitech Solutions Pvt. Ltd	Linearixed (IIT Roorkee)
Bigfix Gadget Care Llp	Lucideus
BYTEXFUSION (OPC) PRIVATE LIMITED	Market Entry and Retail Consulting
Cradlewise (Chigroo Labs Pvt. Ltd. )	MAYAKRISHNA SALES PVT LTD.
DEAZZLE SERVICES PRIVATE LIMITED	Nearex Technologies Pvt. Ltd.
DCIRRUS CLOUD COMPUTING SERVICES PVT LTD	o-hire
Gaia Smart Cities Solutions Pvt Ltd	RAIDLAYER WEBHOST PRIVATE LIMITED
Genietalk.ai	GenieTalk Private Limited
Goldbin	Sensworx Systems India Private Limited
Healthol	Shellios India
Heuro	TestRight Nanosystems Pvt. Ltd
Indovators	V-Cloakroom
Knowmadin India	

== Key highlights and announcements ==
A number of key announcements were made at the India Mobile Congress.

S. No.	Organization / Company	Announcement	Relevance for India
1.a.	Samsung & R Jio	5G Live Demo of the Skyship Drone	Applications in public safety & surveillance, agriculture monitoring and disaster response.
1.b..	Ericsson & R Jio	Demo of connected car on a 5G network	Environmental quality, reduce traffic collisions and fatality rates. Driver safety and data processing and management.
2.	Ericsson & Airtel	Drone flying on 5G. Surveillance and logistics	Autonomous drone applications in mission-critical applications, disaster management, emergency deliveries, medicine and remote surveillance.
3	Nokia	Manufacturing of Nokia 5G NR (New Radio)	Nokia's state-of-the-art manufacturing unit in Chennai will start large scale manufacturing of 5G New Radio enabling made in India for the World.
4.	Ericsson	Export of 5G ready equipment from India	Ericsson started exporting 5G ready telecom equipment from its manufacturing facility in Pune, to global markets. Its state-of-the-art facility will cater enabling made in India for the World
5.	BSNL, Airtel, JIo, Vodafone idea	One Million WiFi Hotspots across India	The telecom industry will install 1 million Wi-Fi hotspots in the next 12 months. Interoperability across different WiFi networks thereby enabling smooth experience for subscribers, as he or she will be able to use the data plan taken from any TSP for all the WiFi Hotspots deployed across India. Besides offering consumer delight, this industry initiative will create additional 3 lakh jobs.

== Awards and recognition ==
India Mobile Congress won the award for "The Knowledge Hub" at the Exhibition Excellence Awards 2019 held at Expo Center, Greater Noida on 23 March 2019.
