= 2013 Jhankar Saikia mob lynching =

Indian student killed over unpaid fare

- Location: 25.8465°N 93.4299°E; Diphu, Karbi Anglong district, Assam, India
- Date: June 25, 2013; 13 years ago
- Attack type: Lynching
- Deaths: 1
- Injuries: Haren Saikia
- Victim: Jhankar Saikia
- Perpetrator: est. 50 people
- Inquiry: CID, Assam Police
- Accused: 19 people
- Convictions: Life imprisonment
- Convicted: 12 people

2013 Jhankar Saikia Mob Lynching happened in Diphu town, Karbi Anglong district, Assam, in India on 25 June 2013 when Diphu College student Jhankar Saikia and his father, Haren Saikia, refused to pay an auto-rickshaw fare of Rs. 30, when the regular fare was Rs. 20, and were attacked by a mob as a result.

== Incident ==
In that incident, Diphu College student Jhankar Saikia and his father Haren Saikia were attacked by a group after they refused to pay the demanded fare of Rs. 30 to the auto-rickshaw driver they hired, where the regular fare was Rs. 20. Local eyewitnesses said to reporters that, at the time of the incident, there were policemen on duty, but the policemen didn't try to stop the mob. Jhankar died in hospital on 1 July.

== Case registered ==
After Jhankar's death, a case was registered (Case no 95 of 2013, Diphu police station) under Sections 294 (punishment for annoying others with obscene act, songs, reciting, or uttering any obscene song, ballad or words, in or near any public place), 325 (punishment for voluntarily causing grievous hurt), 307 (punishment for attempt to murder), 109 (punishment for abetment), 147 (punishment for rioting), 148 (punishment for rioting and armed with deadly weapon), 149 (punishment for unlawful assembly in prosecution of the common object), 337 (punishment for causing hurt by act endangering life or personal safety of others), 338 (punishment for causing hurt by act endangering life or personal safety of others), 302 (murder) and 34 (acts done by several persons in furtherance of common intention) of the Indian Penal Code.

== Delays ==
As the trial of the case was not started for 5 years, Jhankar's father started a Facebook campaign to demand justice and criticized the government for the delayed trial. Bhaskar Dev Konwar, an advocate, filed a Public Interest Litigation in the Gauhati High Court seeking an official inquiry into Jhankar's killing. Following this, the case was handed to the Criminal Investigation Department. The Gauhati High Court also issued notice to the Assam government for the delayed investigation.

== Trial ==
The trial commenced in 2018 with charges filed against 19 people.

== Sentencing ==
At the end of the trial, 12 of the accused were convicted and sentenced to life imprisonment, 2 had absconded, 1 was tried in juvenile court, and 4 were acquitted.

== See also ==
- 2018 Karbi Anglong lynching
- Lynching of Deben Dutta
