= Name and shame (campaign) =

British anti-paedophile campaign (2000)

- Date: 23–30 July 2000*
- Location: United Kingdom
- Caused by: Murder of Sarah Payne, sensationalistic journalism
- Result: Lynch-mob attacks in England and Scotland; 150-people riot in Plymouth, South England; 2 deaths by suicide; 2 vigilante murders

Casualties
- Deaths: 4
- Arrested: 24+
- * Date of the last published issue; mob violence continued afterwards

"Name and shame" (Note: Usually written in lowercase and between quotes.) was an anti-paedophile public shaming campaign launched by the British tabloid newspaper the News of the World in 2000. It resulted in several lynch-mob and firebomb attacks in England and Scotland, most having been directed at people wrongfully alleged to be paedophiles or child sex offenders.

The News of the World was owned by the press magnate Rupert Murdoch and edited by Rebekah Brooks. It published sensationalistic articles about indiscriminate types of sex offenders, in which their identities and home addresses would be exposed. The "name and shame" campaign was initially supported by deputy prime minister John Prescott and home secretary David Blunkett, although government authorities soon began to distance themselves. It was opposed by the liberal press, human rights groups and police agencies.

Having published a total of two issues in seven days, the campaign was cancelled in August amid criticism from government bodies. Vigilante mob attacks and marches carried on after its termination. Most of the anti-paedophile protestors were women and children. The campaign unsuccessfully called for laws allowing public access to sex offender registries in the UK, which subsequently remained mostly restricted.

== History ==
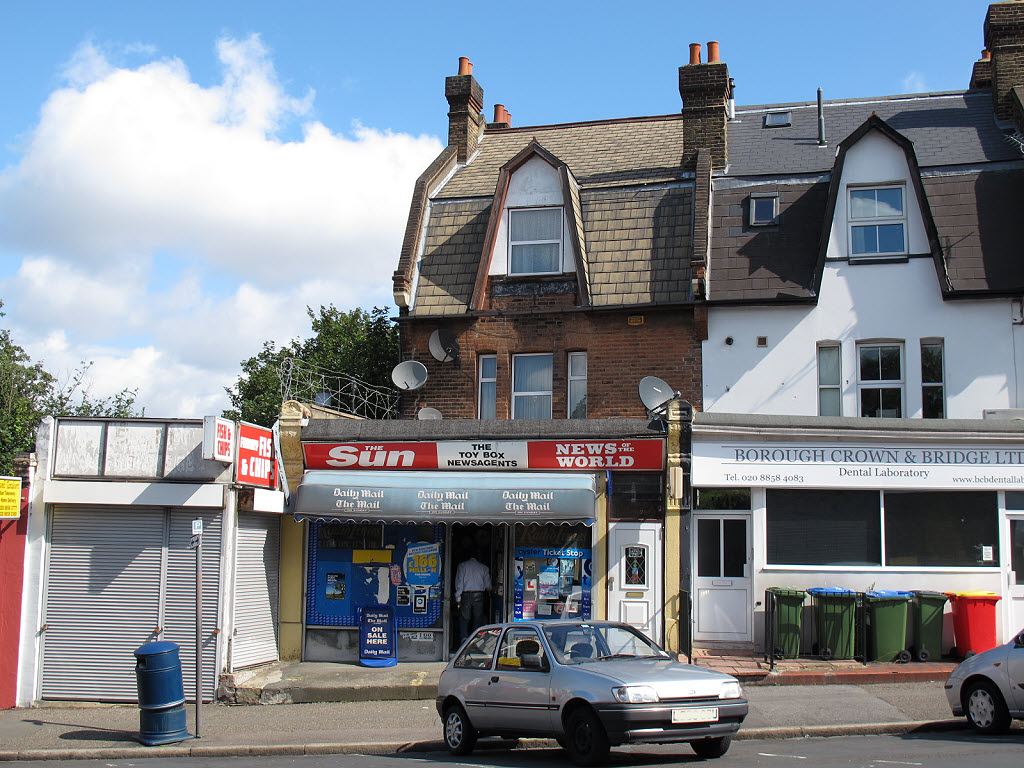
Newsagent shop selling News of the World newspapers in London, 2011

Following the abduction and killing of Sarah Payne in July 2000, News of the World began campaigning for laws that publicly disclosed personal details of people convicted of sex offences. After the government stated that it had no plans to implement such laws, the newspaper, edited by Rebekah Brooks, began publishing names of sex offenders itself in name and shame on 23 July 2000.

After the first issue was published, several lynch mobs and protestors gathered in several parts of the United Kingdom. A group of mothers from Hampshire organised nightly marches and held "vigils" near homes of people convicted of sex offenders. In Paulsgrove, a life-size doll was hanged while protestors chanted "we'll lynch the pervs". A Greater Manchester man had his home surrounded by a mob of 300 people, who shouted "paedophile, rapist, beast, pervert" at him and dragged a six-year-old child to his door while asking "do you want this one?". The Guardian reported some instances of people who had died by suicide after being targeted by such mobs. During those gatherings, several participants told newspapers that they would lynch suspected sex offenders if given the opportunity.

Another riot involving about 150 broke out in Plymouth, in which protestors attacked the police and destroyed property while carrying News of the World headlines. The riot lasted for three hours and resulted in one police officer being sent to the hospital, another having a brick hit his face, and a car being set on fire. In Portsmouth, 24 people were arrested during violent protests.

The second and final issue of name and shame was published on 30 July 2000. Mob attacks continued to occur until at least November. Although the campaign promised to publish personal details of 100,000 people, it only had published 81 names before being cancelled in August. The major campaign was Brooks' first as editor of News of the World.

== Victims ==
- A pediatrician from Gwent had her home vandalised after vigilantes took her job title for the word "paedophile".
- A retired sea captain was murdered by two vigilantes, who firebombed his home after he was wrongfully accused of being a sex offender. Both perpetrators were jailed for life.
- A Glasgow man was beaten to death by vigilantes who accused him of sex crimes.
- A group of sixty people threw paint at the house of, and verbally attacked, a Plymouth man who was wrongfully accused of child sex crimes.
- Two people suspected of sex crimes died by suicide amid civil unrest related to name and shame.
- A 66-year-old Guildford man had his neighbours receive letters falsely accusing him of sexual crimes. He was then provided with overnight protection by police, who distributed leaftlets stating his innocence.
- A 78-year-old Croydon man had his home address distributed to about 300 households near his home in leaflets that wrongfully accused him of sex crimes.
- A 55-year-old man had leaflets wrongfully accusing him of sex crimes distributed to about 500 households near his home.
- Several families from Portsmouth fled their homes due to violent protests in the area that lasted for five days. They were offered rehousing by the Portsmouth City Council.

== See also ==
- Doxing
- Indian WhatsApp lynchings
