= Indian WhatsApp lynchings =

Type of violence in India

- Type: Moral panic, mass hysteria, lynchings, mob violence
- Cause: Fake news spread via social media, especially WhatsApp
- Deaths: ≥ 23
- Arrests: ≥ 600

The Indian WhatsApp lynchings are a spate of mob-related violence and killings following the spread of rumours, primarily relating to child abduction and organ harvesting, via WhatsApp. The spate of lynchings commenced in May 2017 with the killing of seven men in Jharkhand, but did not become a matter of national attention until the beginning of the following year. Fake messages customised with locally specific details are circulated along with real videos attached to fake messages or claims.

In almost all of the lynching locations, no child abductions had been recorded in the previous three months.

The majority of the attacks have occurred deep within the interior regions of villages. The lynch mobs included men, women and children. In some cases the mobs were composed largely of illiterate or poorly educated men that were unemployed or working as day labourers as well as being under the influence of alcohol at the time of the attack. In at least some of the cases, prime instigators have used child-abduction fears to stir up violence and settle old scores.

== Responses ==
The Indian Government does not track public lynchings and there are no official statistics from the Indian Crime Records Bureau regarding their occurrence across India.

Media coverage over the killings and efforts to debunk fake news have also been concentrated in English- and Hindi-language media, with little attention given to local-language reporting.

On 4 July 2018, WhatsApp offered $50,000 in funding for researchers to develop technological and social ideas to prevent the spread of fake news.

On 10 July 2018, WhatsApp launched a newspaper advertising campaign warning against fake news and announced changes for Indian users of the platform that labels forwarded messages as such.

== Notable cases ==
=== 2018 Karbi Anglong lynching ===
The 2018 Karbi Anglong lynching occurred when two men who were visiting the Kangthilangso waterfall to search for ornamental fish stopped their vehicle to ask villagers for directions. A mob of inebriated villagers suspected them to be child abductors and attacked them with machetes, bamboo poles and wood. The two men succumbed to their injuries before they could be taken to a hospital. A video was circulated of the two men covered in blood and begging for mercy.

=== 2020 Palghar mob lynching ===
On 16 April 2020, a vigilante group lynched two Hindu Sadhus and their drivers in Gadchinchale Village, Palghar District, Maharashtra, India. The incident was fuelled by WhatsApp rumours about thieves operating in the area during the nationwide lockdown due to the COVID-19 pandemic. The vigilante group of villagers had mistaken the three passengers for thieves and killed them. The policemen who intervened were also attacked, with four policemen and a senior police officer getting injured.

By 20 April, more than 100 villagers had been arrested by the Maharashtra police on charges of murder of the three men. After the incident, rumours were spread to stoke religious tension. On 22 April, Maharashtra Home Minister Anil Deshmukh posted a complete list of people arrested, and said that none of the people arrested were Muslims. The government said that both the attackers and the victims were of the same religion.

== List of attacks and lynchings ==
Date	Victims	Location	State	Deaths	Injuries	Arrests	Circumstances
May 12, 2017	Two men	Jadugora, East Singhbhum district	Jharkhand	2			Two people in Jadugora were beaten to death and as many injured by a mob on suspicion of being child abductors.
May 17, 2017	Unidentified man	Shobhapur village, Kolhan	Jharkhand	1			One man was beaten to death on suspicion of being a child abductor.
May 17, 2017	Two unidentified men	Sosomoli village	Jharkhand	2			Two men were beaten to death on suspicion of being child abductors.
April 10, 2018	Rukmani (female, 65), Chandrasekaran (male, 34), Mohan Kumar (male, 34), Venkatesan (51), Gajendran	Athimur, Tiruvannamalai	Tamil Nadu	1	3	42	65 year old Rukmani and her family were travelling from Chennai to visit the family temple when they stopped to ask an elderly lady for directions. Whilst stopping, they gave chocolates to local children. The lady told the rest of the village that they must be child traffickers. A mob of 200 gathered, stripped the family and beat them, killing Rukmani, critically injuring the other three and overturning their vehicle. Police were present but unable to stop the violence until an ambulance arrived. Videos taken of the attack were circulated and used to identify perpetrators. Claims that 52 children in the district had been abducted were circulating on WhatsApp prior to the lynching. Police commenced an awareness campaign against fake news in the days following the attack.
April 29, 2018	1 man (30s)	Parasuramapatti, Gudiyatham, Vellore	Tamil Nadu	1			A 30 year old Hindi-speaking migrant worker was suspected of being a child-abductor and beaten to death. Police commence a public awareness campaign.
May 11, 2018	Ganesh (30s)	Tiruvaller, Chennai	Tamil Nadu	1		20	A mentally-ill man who had been seen roaming the streets for several months was attacked by 90 villagers who accused him of being a child kidnapper. They broke his nose, gouged out an eye, and hung him from a bridge near Pulicat Lake. The cause was fake videos and messages circulating via WhatsApp.
May 17, 2018	Uttam Kumar Verma (male), Ganesh Kumar Gupta (male), Vikas Verma (25), Gautam Verma (27), elderly woman (80s)	Nagadih	Jharkhand	4			Two brothers working for the Swachh Bharat campaign and a friend were beaten to death by tribals in front of their 80-year-old grandmother. Their older brother sustained injuries in the attack. Police failed to rescue them, with witnesses accusing them of standing and watching. WhatsApp rumours were blamed for the attack. Angry villagers torched two police vehicles. It was reported that the grandmother was also beaten and died later.
June 8, 2018	Bharat Sonavne (male), Shivaji Shinde (male), and 7 other men	Chandgaon, Vaijapur taluka	Maharashtra	2	7	400	Two men were beaten to death and seven others were injured, one of them critically, after a mob of villagers attacked them with wooden sticks after receiving social media messages about a gang of robbers in the area.
July 1, 2018	2 men, 2 women, 1 child	Malegaon	Maharashtra	0	4		A family of daily wage labourers were accused by a teenager of being child abductors and set upon by surrounding crowd. All five were rescued by police. The crowd attacked police and overturned a police vehicle. The four are critically injured in hospital. Cause believed to be fake videos originating in Karnataka.
July 1, 2018	Dadarao Bhosale, Bharat Bhosale, Aappa Ingole, Bharat Malve and Raju Bhosale	Rainpada village, Dhule district	Maharashtra	5			5 people belonging to the nomadic community Nath Panthi Davari Gosavi were lynched to death on the suspicion of being child traffickers. Rumours on social media suggested that child abductors were active in the area.
July 16, 2018	Mohammed Azam (28), Salham Eid Al Kubasi, Noor Mohammed, 1 other man	Bidar district	Karnataka	1	3	32	An IT worker named Mohammed Azam was visiting a relative with three friends when they saw some children in the village to whom they gave Qatari chocolates. Villagers, suspecting them to be child-snatchers, turned hostile. The group fled in their car, but residents called ahead to the village of Murki and blocked the road. The car flipped into a ditch and the men dragged them out of the vehicle and beat them with sticks and stones. By the time the police arrived, Azam was dead and the others had sustained critical injuries. Eight policemen were injured, two seriously.
July 19, 2018	1 woman (25)	Bhosh village, Morwa, Singrauli	Madhya Pradesh	1		14	Following the circulation of WhatsApp messages a group of tribal men suspected a homeless, mentally-disabled woman, attacking her with sticks, rods and a pick-axe. Her body was dumped in the jungle, but found shortly afterwards by the police.
April 18, 2020	Sushil Giri Maharaj (35), Nilesh Telgane (35), and Chikane Maharaj Kalpavrikshgiri (70)	Palghar	Maharashtra	3		110	See 2020 Palghar mob lynching. Three men who were driving to a funeral during coronavirus lockdown were lynched by the vigilante group on the suspicion of being thieves after rumours were floated in the area.

== See also ==
- Cow vigilante violence in India
- WhatsApp University
- Name and shame (campaign) – Public shaming campaign that resulted in similar incidents in the United Kingdom
