= Gangadhar Pantawane =

Indian Marathi language writer (1937–2018)

- Born: 28 June 1937; Nagpur, British India (now in Maharashtra, India)
- Died: 27 March 2018 (aged 80); Aurangabad, Maharashtra, India
- Education: D.C. Mission School, Nagpur; Rashtrasant Tukadoji Maharaj Nagpur University, Dr. Babasaheb Ambedkar Marathwada University
- Occupations: Writer, social activist
- Children: 2 daughters: Nandita and Nivedita
- Writing career
- Language: Marathi
- Genre: Ambedkarite movement
- Notable works: Dhammacharcha (1963); Mulyavedha (1972); Mooknayak (1978); Leni (1997)

Gangadhar Vithoba Pantawane (28 June 1937 – 27 March 2018) was an Indian Marathi language writer, reviewer and Ambedkarite thinker from the state of Maharashtra. He was the follower of B. R. Ambedkar. He is one of the pioneers of the Dalit literary movement in Maharashtra. In 2008, he was elected president of the first Marathi Vishwa Sahitya Sammelan that was held in the United States. His pioneering journal, Asmitadarsh, galvanised generations of Dalit writers and thinkers. In 2018, he was honored with the Padma Shri by the Government of India.

== Life and career ==
Gangadhar Pantawane was born on 28 June 1937 in the Pachpawali area of Nagpur city. His father Vithoba Pantawane was not well-educated but he was linked to Babasaheb Ambedkar's egalitarian movement. Their lives have been spent in poverty. Gangadhar completed his elementary education from D.C. Mission school and secondary education from Navyug Vidyalaya and Patwardhan High School, Nagpur. When Babasaheb Ambedkar had come to Nagpur in 1946, when he was 9 years old, he was very impressed by seeing them. For the second time when Babasaheb came to Nagpur, he got a chance to meet and talk to him. After matriculation examination in 1956, Gagangadhar Pantawane got BA and MA degree from Nagpur College. in 1987, he got PhD from Marathwada University (now Dr. Babasaheb Ambedkar Marathwada University. His PhD's thesis research is about on journalism of Ambedkar named "Patrakar Dr. Babasaheb Ambedkar" (English: Journalist Dr. Babasaheb Ambedkar). Before moving to Aurangabad in the early 1960s as a professor in Milind College, Aurangabad where he spent 15 years of service and then worked as a professor of Marathi at Dr. Babasaheb Ambedkar Marathwada University, Aurangabad for 20 years. He used to write articles and plays with studies, teachers and editorials. "Mrutyu Shala" (School of Death) is a drama written by him. He also organized the Asmitadarsh Sahitya Sammelan every year.

== Conversion ==
With the presence of 6,00,000 people Pantawane embraced Buddhism at the hands of Babasaheb Ambedkar at Deekshabhoomi, Nagpur on 14 October 1956.

== Death ==
Pantawane died on 27 March 2018 in city of Aurangabad due to illness.

== Writings ==
Pantawane, had written 16 books and edited 10 books in Marathi language. He was also a founder of journal called 'Asmitadarsh'.

=== Marathi books ===
- Ambedkari Janivanchi Aatmapratyayi Kavita (Goda publication)
- Sanity: Shod ani Samvadh (2002)
- Sahitya Nirmiti: Charcha ani Chikitsa
- Sahitya: Prakruti ani Pravruti (1999)
- Arth ani Anvayarth
- Chaitya Dalit Vaicharik Wangmay
- Dusrya Pidhiche Manogat
- Kille Panhala te Kille Vishalgad
- Dhamma Charchha
- Patrakar Dr. Babasaheb Ambedkar (1987)
- Mulyavedhleni (1972)
- Lokrang
- Wadlache Vanshaj
- Vidrohache Pani Petale Aahe (1976)
- Smrutishesh (Suvidya publication)
- Dalitanche Prabodhan (1978)
- Prabodhanachya Disha (1984)

=== Editing ===
- Dr. Babasaheb Ambedkar Yanche Nivdak Lekh
- Asmitadarsh
- Dalit-Gramin Marathi Shabdkosh
- Dalit Atmakatha
- Dalit Sahitya
- Charcha ani Chintan
- Lokrang
- Shtri Atmakatha
- Maharancha Sanskrutik Itihas

== Honours and awards ==
List of awards and honours won by Gangadhar Pantawane.

- Padma Shri, 2018
- Dr. Babasaheb Ambedkar Jivan Gaurav Award, 2016
- Maharshi Vittal Ramaji Shinde Award, 2006, Wai, Satara
- Phadakule Pursakar, 2018
- Aurangabad Bhushan Award, 2014, Rotary club of Aurangabad
