= Saksham Yadav =

Indian powerlifter

Personal information
- Nickname: Bablu
- Nationality: Indian
- Born: 7 October 1993 Nangloi, Delhi, India
- Died: 7 January 2018 (aged 25) Delhi-Panipat Highway
- Height: 175 cm (5 ft 9 in)
- Weight: 75 kg (165 lb)

Sport
- Country: India
- Sport: Powerlifting

Saksham Yadav (7 October 1993 – 7 January 2018) was a male Indian powerlifter and a former powerlifting world champion. He died on 7 January 2018 after suffering injuries received during a vehicle accident.

== Biography ==
Saksham Yadav was born to a middle-class family in outer Delhi, Nangloi on 7 October 1993. After completing his schooling, he enrolled in an Engineering Course but did not complete it, as he was more interested in bodybuilding and powerlifting. Due to his hard work and dedication, he went on to win numerous state and national powerlifting championships, and claimed a gold medal in the junior powerlifting world championship in Europe. He claimed world championship and best sportsperson trophy in the 2017 Powerlifting World Championships which was held in Moscow, Russia. His YouTube videos on powerlifting, deadlift and benchpress have been viewed by thousands. He loved dogs and always helped injured animals.

=== Death ===
At around 3:00 am on 7 January 2018, Saksham Yadav was travelling in a Maruti Suzuki Dzire car with five other powerlifters from Delhi where the accident occurred (in foggy conditions) at the Sindhu border (Delhi-Panipat highway): they intended to arrive in Panipat for training. Four of the powerlifters were killed almost immediately in the accident, while Saksham and Rohit were critically injured. They were admitted to the Raja Harish Chandra Hospital. Hours later, at around 6:38 pm, it was confirmed that Saksham Yadav had died due to cardiac arrest, and other causes were confirmed as grievous head injuries and severe internal bleeding.
