= Pakki encounter =

2018 shootout in Punjab, India

The Pakki encounter was a shootout between Punjab Police and members of the Jaipal Singh criminal gang in the Pakki village of Sri Ganganagar district in the western Indian state of Rajasthan, resulting in the deaths of fugitive Vicky Gounder along with Prema Lahoria and Sukhpreet Singh. Vicky and Prema died on the spot, while Sukhpreet was injured in the encounter and later died at Abohar civil hospital during treatment. During the encounter two police personnel were grievously wounded.

Harjinder Bhullar, aged 28, known by his nickname Vicky Gounder was the mastermind of the 2016 Nabha jailbreak and was wanted in fifteen cases of murder, kidnapping and robbery in states of Punjab, Haryana, Rajasthan and Uttar Pradesh and carried a bounty of 10 lakh rupees on his head.
