= 2020 Palghar mob lynching =

Indian group killing

- Gadchinchale (Maharashtra)
- Location: 20.0843517°N 73.0611882°E; Gadchinchale, Palghar District, Maharashtra, India
- Date: 16 April 2020
- Attack type: Lynching
- Weapons: Stones, axes, sticks
- Deaths: 3
- Accused: 115 villagers, 9 juveniles

On 16 April 2020, a vigilante group lynched two Hindu Sadhus and their driver in Gadchinchale Village, Palghar District, Maharashtra, India. The incident was fuelled by rumours of thieves operating in the area during the countrywide coronavirus lockdown. The vigilante group of villagers had mistaken the three passengers as thieves and killed them. Policemen who intervened were also attacked; four policemen and a senior police officer were injured.

As of 4 May 2020, 115 villagers had been arrested by the Maharashtra police on charges of murder. After the incident, rumours were spread to stoke religious tension. On 22 April, Maharashtra Home Minister, Anil Deshmukh posted a complete list of people arrested, stating that none of the arrested were Muslims. The government said that both the attackers and the victims were of same religion.

== Background ==
In the past, attacks and lynchings fuelled by rumours on WhatsApp have occurred in India, where the fast propagation of fake news has led to violent outcomes. Often the fake news involves rumours of child kidnapping or roaming bandits.

After rumours spread in the village about the possible activity of organ harvesting gangs and kidnappers in the area at night, the villagers formed a vigilante group. According to the Gadchinchale Sarpanch (village head) a rumour had been floating in the village from the messaging app WhatsApp, claiming a gang of child thieves harvesting organs was active in the area during the lock-down. India was under a countrywide lockdown due to the coronavirus pandemic at the time of the incident. The arrival of the vehicle at night caused the villagers to suspect that the passengers were members of the gang of child thieves.

== Incident ==
Two Juna Akhara Sadhus Chikne Maharaj Kalpavrukshagiri (70 years old) and Sushilgiri Maharaj (35 years old) along with their 30-year-old driver Nilesh Telgade were travelling to attend the funeral of their Guru Shri Mahant Ramgiri in Surat. Around 10 pm, as they were passing through Gadchinchale, 140 km north of Mumbai, a forest department sentry stopped their car at local checkpoint. While they were talking to the sentry the vigilante group accosted and attacked them with sticks and axes. The Indian Express reported that the victims were mistaken for being child thieves and organ harvesters.

According to reports published on 17 April, the police had tried to control the mob, but they were beaten when they tried to intervene. Four policemen and a senior police officer received injuries in the incident.

On 19 April, several bystander videos went viral. In one of the videos, a police officer is seen leading Kalpavrukshagiri out of a building. The mob begins attacking Kalpavrukshagiri who is seen begging for his life, while policemen try to control the situation. The attackers then take him away and kill him. In another video, the mob is seen breaking the windows of a police patrol vehicle. The vehicle is seen rolled over with shattered glass in yet another video.

== Arrests ==
According to the Maharashtra Home Minister Anil Deshmukh, 101 persons were arrested by the police within 8 hours of the offence. Nine juveniles were also among those and two police officers were suspended for alleged negligence on duty, until an inquiry is conducted in the case. The police said that all the accused were from the Vikramgad Taluka and Gadchnchale village in the Dahanu Taluka, of the Palghar district.

On 22 April, Home Minister Deshmukh posted a complete list of people arrested, and said that none of the people arrested were Muslims and the Bharatiya Janata Party (BJP)-led opposition in Maharashtra was trying to make the lynching a religious Hindu-Muslim issue. He stated the case was being investigated by the Maharashtra CID (Criminal Investigation Department). The government said that the attackers and the victims were of the same religion.

On the evening of 19 April, Chief Minister of the state Uddhav Thackeray issued the statement that culprits involved in this lynching will be brought to justice. He said that strict action should be taken against the accused, and transferred the case to the Criminal Investigation Department of Maharashtra State and Additional Director General Atulchandra Kulkarni. State home minister Anil Deshmukh announced a high-level inquiry to probe the lynching incident. Thackeray said that the authorities would proceed to a speedy trial and take tough action on the accused and were also investigating the people who had spread the rumours and hate messages online.

== Reactions ==
This incidence attracted nationwide outrage on 19 April, after the videos went viral on social media, and the Maharashtra Government received criticism.

Opposition leaders including former Chief Minister of Maharashtra Devendra Fadnavis, chief minister of Uttar Pradesh Yogi Adityanath, demanded a high level inquiry into the incident. On 20 April, Mahant Hari Giri, the Mahamandaleshwar of Juna Akhara demanded swift action against culprits and police responsible for the lynching.

Uddhav Thackeray urged Home Minister Amit Shah to take action against those who were stoking religious tension. Maharashtra State Congress general secretary Sachin Sawant accused the Bharatiya Janata Party (BJP) of "communal politics" over the lynching. "The village Divashi Gadchinchale is known as BJP bastion for the last ten years including the post of the village head. The current head is also from BJP. Most of the people arrested in the lynching incident are from BJP." The BJP denied the charges.

National Human Rights Commission of India sent a request to the Maharashtra police chief asking for a report with details of action taken against the accused and any relief provided to relatives of the victims, to be sent within four weeks.
