= Youngky Kim =

South Korean businessman (born 1962)

- Born: January 7, 1962 (age 64)
- Education: Bachelor's degree in electronic engineering Master's degree in electrical engineering Doctorate in communications engineering
- Alma mater: Kyunggi High School; Seoul National University; University of Southern California

Youngky Kim (born January 7, 1962) is the president of the Network Business at Samsung Electronics.

He graduated from Kyunggi High School in 1980 and Seoul National University in 1984 with a bachelor's degree in electronic engineering. He also received a master's degree in electrical engineering from the University of Southern California in 1985, and a doctorate in communications engineering from 1990.

He was named Fellow of the Institute of Electrical and Electronics Engineers (IEEE) in 2015 for leadership in mobile communication systems.
