= Naseem Mirza Changezi =

Indian independence activist (1910–2018)

- Born: 1910
- Died: April 12, 2018 (aged 108; disputed); Pahari Imli, Old Delhi, India
- Education: Zakir Husain Delhi College
- Occupation: Independence activist

Naseem Mirza Changezi (1910 – April 12, 2018) was an Indian independence activist. He was also believed to have been one of the oldest living individuals in India at the time of his death.

== Early life and education ==
Naseem Mirza Changezi traces his family's roots in Old Delhi from the times of Mughal emperor Shah Jahan. He was educated at the Anglo Arabic College, now called Zakir Husain Delhi College. Over the years, he collected a large number of books in Urdu and Persian.

He met revolutionary freedom fighter Bhagat Singh in 1929. Bhagat Singh told him of his intentions to bomb the Central Legislative Assembly and wanted his help in finding a safe house to hide in. Naseem later went into hiding in Gwalior after Bhagat Sigh carried out his mission.

== Personal life ==
In 2016, he was still living with his 90-year-old wife, Amna Khannum, and 60-year-old son, Mirza Sikander Beg Changezi, in the Old Delhi area. His youngest son, Mirza Tariq Beg, lives in Karachi, Pakistan. Changezi had seven daughters and two sons. Many of them still live in the Old Delhi area. He had 20 grandchildren.

In 2016, Naseem Mirza Changezi claimed to be 106 years old.

== Legacy ==
Naseem, in his lifetime, claimed to have seen many events in Indian and world history, World War I, Jallianwala Bagh massacre, Satyagraha (Nonviolent resistance), Khilafat movement, the making of New Delhi, Second world war, Quit India Movement and finally the independence of India. His life story has been covered by many newspapers and TV documentaries.

In March 2016, Chief Minister of Delhi, Arvind Kejriwal unveiled three busts of the famous martyrs at Delhi Legislative Assembly who gave their lives for the cause of Indian independence movement, Bhagat Singh, Shivaram Hari Rajguru and Sukhdev Thapar. Naseem Mirza Changezi was selected to address the gathering at the official ceremony. He remarked that martyr Bhagat Singh wanted all religions and sects in India to live together in unity.
