= India Mobile Congress =

Indian telecommunications forum

- Genre: Digital technologies and Telecommunication
- Venue: Pragati Maidan
- Locations: Pragati Maidan, New Delhi
- Country: India
- Inaugurated: 2017; 9 years ago
- Most recent: 8 October 2025
- Attendance: 100,000
- Organizer: COAI and DoT
- Website: www.indiamobilecongress.com

The India Mobile Congress (IMC) is a digital technologies' forum in Asia consisting of a three-day international conference and a technology exhibition. The event is envisioned to be the "leading platform for India's start-up and technology ecosystem." Within the telecommunications and technology industry, IMC is claimed to be the "largest digital technology forum in Asia." The event is organized jointly by the Cellular Operators Association of India (COAI) and the Department of Telecommunications (DoT) of the Government of India. The forum aims to be a platform for industry, businesses, regulators and policymakers to discuss and deliberate on critical issues affecting the growth of the telecom and technology sector. In its first two iterations, the IMC focused on transformative 5G technology and most of the booths showcased various use-cases and scenarios where 5G would play an important role; the exhibitors included service providers, OEMs and infrastructure providers.

== Organizers ==
India Mobile Congress is jointly organized by the Department of Telecommunications of the Government of India and the Cellular Operators Association of India.

=== Department of Telecommunications ===
The Department of Telecommunications is a department of the Ministry of Communications of the Government of India. The department was formed to ensure reliable, affordable and high-quality telecommunications services in the country that could facilitate accelerated and inclusive socio-economic development.

=== Cellular Operators Association of India ===
The Cellular Operators Association of India (COAI) is a registered non-governmental society, constituted in 1995, for the advancement of modern communication and successful proliferation of mobile networks throughout India. COAI is an official voice of the Indian telecom industry and aims to present an industry consensus to the Government on issues related to the Indian telecom industry.

== Past events ==
Starting in 2017, the India Mobile Congress has been held annually. It took place in India 27–29 September in 2017, 25–27 October in 2018, and 14–16 October in 2019; IMC 2020 and IMC 2021 were both held virtually 8–10 December.

=== India Mobile Congress 2017 ===
India Mobile Congress 2017 was held from 27 September 2017 to 29 September 2017 at Pragati Maidan, New Delhi. This was the first iteration of the globally recognized event and saw the participation of 2000 delegates, 32000 visitors, 152 speakers, 100 start-ups and 100 exhibitors. IMC 2017 was inaugurated by Manoj Sinha, Minister of State (Independent Charge) for Communications. Some of the notable speakers at the event included:

- Ravi Shankar Prasad, Minister of Electronics and Information Technology
- Dharmendra Pradhan, Minister for Skill Development and Entrepreneurship
- Vittorio Colao, CEO of Vodafone Group
- Mukesh Ambani, Chairman, Reliance Industries
- Sunil Bharti Mittal, Chairman, Bharti Enterprises
- Rajan Anandan, Google Vice President for South East Asia and India

India Mobile Congress 2017 was dubbed "the country's first and biggest ever, platform to bring together all stakeholders from Telecom, Internet & Mobility ecosystem along with Information and Communication Technology players, app developers, innovators and start-ups." Exhibitors included Telecom Service Providers, handset manufacturers, Internet giants, ISPs, Global technology players, AI & VR companies, Mobility leaders, Academia, Start-ups and app providers.

=== India Mobile Congress 2018 ===
India Mobile Congress 2018 was held on 25 October 2018 through 27 October 2018 at Aerocity, New Delhi. The event inaugurated by Manoj Sinha, Minister of State (Independent Charge) for Communications. The keynote address was delivered by Youngky Kim, President and Head of Networks Business at Samsung Electronics. The theme for IMC 2018 was "New Digital Horizons Connect, Create, Innovate".

The event venue was spread over 50,000 square meters of space and participants included:

- 50,000+ visitors
- 20 countries
- 5000+ international delegates
- 300 companies showcasing their latest products and innovations
- 10 supporting ministries

=== India Mobile Congress 2019 ===
India Mobile Congress 2019 was held on 14 October 2019 to 16 October 2019 at Aerocity, New Delhi. Jointly organized by the Department of Telecommunications and the Cellular Operators Association of India, with support from Ministry of Electronics and Information Technology. The theme for IMC 2019 was "Imagine: a new CONNECTED world; Intelligent. Immersive. Inventive." The event was inaugurated by Sh. Ravi Shankar Prasad. IMC 2019's participants included more than 50 countries and telecom giants, OEMs, system integrators, technology experts, industry analysts, government officials, young professionals, startups and students.

==== Technology and innovation ====
The focus area for IMC 2019 was 5G, with more than 50 5G demos (use cases) showcased over three days. A number of companies including Ericsson, Huawei, Airtel, Vodafone Idea, Jio, Nokia, Qualcomm and ZTE showcased unique 5G use cases. Apart from 5G, other focus areas included smart cities, internet of things (IoT) and logistics. Dubbed the biggest digital technology platform in Asia, IMC 2019 had 60,000 square meters of total event area and a footfall of 75,278 over three days, generating over 1.4 billion impressions recorded across various social media platforms.

==== Startups ====
More than 250 startups were a part of IMC 2019. To aid startups, the IMC collaborated with Accelerating Growth of New India's Innovations, Invest India, Startup India and Nalco to organize a Grand Innovation Challenge to recognize the best innovations by Indian startups. Notable speakers at the event included:

- Ravi Shankar Prasad, Minister of Electronics and Information Technology. Law & Justice, Government of India
- Kumar Mangalam Birla, Chairman of the Aditya Birla Group
- Malcolm Johnson, Deputy Secretary-General of ITU
- Jim Whitehurst, President and CEO of Red Hat
- Nunzio Mirtillo, Sr. Vice President & Head of Market Area South East Asia, Oceania & India for Ericsson
- Arun Kumar, Chairman and CEO of KPMG India

=== India Mobile Congress 2020 ===
IMC 2020 was a virtual event that had roughly 27,213 attendees, including national and international delegates, over 170 partners, exhibitors and start-ups and more than 196 thought leaders. Prime Minister of India Shri Narendra Modi performed the opening address. This event had more than 1.16 billion digital media impressions and 1.9 million video downloads over the span of three days.

=== India Mobile Congress 2021 ===
IMC 2021 was a virtual event that had roughly 23,118 attendees, again including national and international delegates, over 218 partners, exhibitors and start-ups and more than 226 thought leaders. This event had more than 1.06 billion digital media impressions and 1.42 million video downloads over the span of three days.

=== India Mobile Congress 2022 ===
India Mobile Congress (IMC) 2022, the largest digital event in India and Asia organized by the Department of Telecommunications (DoT) and Cellular Operators Association of India (COAI) was held from 1 to 4 October 2022 at New Delhi.. Recognizing the immense benefits of digital technology advancement, the 6th edition of IMC-2022 with the theme of "New Digital Universe" had the objective of promoting India as a communication leader globally.

Inaugurated by Honorable Prime Minister Shri Narendra Modi on Saturday 1 October 2022, at New Delhi, IMC 2022 brought together stakeholders across the ICT industry to debate, discuss, disseminate and demonstrate the endless potential of 5G. Aligned with Honorable Prime Minister’s vision of ensuring that benefits of digital technology to the remotest corner of India as envisioned in Antyodaya, the event focused on ideating how to democratize 5G in India across sectors like healthcare, education, agriculture, animal husbandry, industrial manufacturing, environment and worker safety apart from promoting Atmanirbharta in communication sector. The inauguration session was also attended by Shri Ashwini Vaishnaw, Honourable Minister for Communications, Electronics & Information Technology and Railways, Shri Devusinh Chauhan, Honorable Minister of State for Communications, Shri K Rajaraman, Secretary Department of Telecommunications along with other government officials. Mr. Mukesh Ambani, Chairman of Reliance Industries, Mr. Sunil Bharti Mittal, Chairman of Bharti enterprises, Kumar Mangalam Birla, Chairman of Aditya Birla Group, also participated in the inaugural session along with other industry stakeholders.

During the course of the four days, the event was also graced by Shri Piyush Goyal, Union Minister of Commerce and Industry, Shri Manush Mandaviya, Honourable Union Minister of Health and Family Welfare, Shri Prahlad Joshi, Union Minister of Parliamentary Affairs, Coal and Mines, Shri PK Mishra, Principal Secretary to the Prime Minister, Shri Rajeev Chandrasekhar Minister of State for Electronics & Information Technology and Skill Development & Entrepreneurship and Secretaries as well as senior officials from various departments of Government of India.

IMC 2022 was a technology event, held in person after a two year hiatus, which attracted over one lakh attendees: 77,000 visitors including students, more than 1,300 CXO’s, over 6900 government officials, over 1800 partners and exhibitors, over 1900 representatives from start-ups and MSMEs and more than 350 speakers.

The key highlights of the event:

- Inauguration of the event and launch of 5G by Honorable Prime Minister Shri Narendra Modi marking a momentous day in telecom history
- 5G brought to life by multiple 5G use-cases showcased to the Honorable Prime Minister including use cases relating to healthcare, edu-tech, agriculture, worker safety etc. during his visit at various pavilions in the exhibition
- Honourable Prime Minister launched C-DoTs indigenously designed and developed, 5G Non-standalone Core
- Demonstration of indigenously developed 5G radio and other equipments
- The Digital India Conference of State IT Ministers was also held for three consecutive days covering presentations by State IT Ministers highlighting their digital transformation initiatives and discussions on relevant topics such as new regulatory framework, emerging technologies, etc.
- Start-ups session hosted by Department of Telecom and chaired by Shri Ashwini Vaishnaw, Hon’ble Minister for Communications, Electronics & Information Technology and Railways. The session saw participation from more than 100 startups showcasing indigenously developed 4G/ 5G solutions.
- Launch of TSuM- Telecom Startup and MSME Mission
- Launch of TTDF- Telecom and Technology Development Fund
- Inauguration of the VoICE Atmanirbhar Pavilion, consisting of 22 member companies which demonstrated 19 product launches
- Shri Ashwini Vaishnaw, Honourable Minister for Communications, Electronics & Information Technology and Railways announced the setting up of 100 5G labs across the country. He also announced the Indian Government is working hard towards simplifying the license regime for all telecom players and suggested to convert minimum 12 of these labs into incubators to train students and promote research and development.
- Showcase of technology innovations across 239 exhibitors highlighting India’s prowess in indigenously developed 4G and 5G network stack.
- International Conference on "Towards 5G Advanced and 6G" which was organized by DoT and TSDSI where 34 research papers were presented made by researchers across the world on new pathways for 6G.
- India Global Connect-Buyers Sellers meet organized by TEPC (Telecom Equipment and Services Export Promotion Council) under Champion Sector Scheme of Department of Telecommunications, under which 80 or more companies participated and showcased their products and services.
- IEEE organized a certification program on 5G and IoT covering some of the topics on 5G Network Architecture, Network Slicing, RAN SPLIT, 5G Test Bed, 5G Use Cases and Challenges, Upcoming 6G wireless, superseding 5G and arriving possibly by 2030, IoT protocols in which participation was seen from academic researchers, students, independent technology enthusiasts and industry professionals.
- The event hosted top leaders of telecom and tech companies, policy makers, thought leaders, and academics who shared their point of view on the future of 5G development and the opportunity and challenges presented by country wide adoption of 5G. In all there were 80 knowledge sharing sessions with over 360 speakers participating at the event.
- The event witnessed the launch of IMC knowledge paper: 5G driving the next growth wave for Digital India in collaboration with its knowledge partner, KPMG in India.
- The event also dedicated time to recognize and felicitate the achievements of the industry in promoting innovation in the sector. The IMC awards provided recognition for path-breaking contributions by the awardees in promoting growth in the sector.

== See also ==
- Cellular Operators Association of India (COAI)
- Department of Telecommunications
