= Kasganj violence =

2018 sectarian violence in Uttar Pradesh, India

2018 Kasganj violence
- Date: 26 January 2018
- Location: Kasganj, Uttar Pradesh, India; 27.82°N 78.65°E
- Caused by: Clash between Hindu-Muslim during a Tiranga bike rally on Republic day, organized by ABVP
- Methods: Rioting, shooting, arson, violence
- Result: Conviction of 28 individuals including Salim as the primary accused in January 2025

Casualties
- Death: 1 death (Chandan Gupta), multiple injuries
- Injuries: 2
- Damage: Shops burnt, property vandalized
- Location of violence in Kasganj, India

Kasganj violence took place on 26 January 2018, in Kasganj, a district in Western Uttar Pradesh, when 22-year-old student of commerce named Chandan Gupta died by gunshot of an Islamist in a Muslim-majority locality of Kasganj during an "Tiranga bike rally" organised by Akhil Bharatiya Vidyarthi Parishad, the student wing of the ruling Bharatiya Janata Party in the state to mark the 69th Republic Day. In January 2025, a special court of the National Investigation Agency convicted 28 individuals in relation to the murder of Chandan Gupta. The convictions included charges of murder, attempted murder, rioting, and disrespecting the national flag.

== Background ==
On 26 January 2018, A Tiranga Yatra was organized by members of the local unit of the BJP-affiliated students' group, Akhil Bharatiya Vidyarthi Parishad (ABVP) to mark the 69th Republic Day. The clash came about after a group in Badu Nagar objected to nationalistic slogans being raised via bike-borne members of the Tiranga Yatra, which had started out from the Bilram Gate area. But as per police, the clash allegedly broke out when a member of the student rally was allegedly slapped by the other group. A 22 years old, Chandan Gupta, was shot dead, and another man named Noushad was admitted to a hospital in Aligarh district after being shot in the leg. Later, the shops were burnt and property was vandalized while returning from the cremation of Chandan Gupta by mobsters. The injured and dead were Chandan Gupta who was allegedly shot by a youth Saleem Javed.

== Aftermath ==
A special team was set up by the Uttar Pradesh Police. UP CM Yogi Adityanath condoled the loss of life in the Kasganj violence and urged people to maintain peace and harmony. The government shut down internet service in the district. On 28 January, 81 people were arrested.

Dr Puja Shakun Pande, state president of the Hindu Mahasabha, was held under preventive detention in her house.

Ram Naik has described the Kasganj communal clashes as a "blot" on the UP state.

Former UP CM and Bahujan Samaj Party chief Mayawati blamed the BJP government for the communal violence and criticed the Yogi Adityanath government in the state. Kalraj Mishra termed the incident 'very unfortunate'.

== Convictions ==
On 2 January 2024, a special National Investigation Agency (NIA) court in Lucknow convicted 28 individuals for the murder of Chandan Gupta during the violence, while acquitting two others for lack of conclusive evidence. The convicted included Salim, identified as the primary accused who shot Gupta, along with Wasim, Nasim, Jahid ‘Jagga’, and others allegedly involved in planning and executing the attack. Among them, Munazir Rafi was already serving a prison sentence for his role in the murder of lawyer Mohini Tomar in September 2024.

The remaining individuals, including Asiq Qureshi ‘Hitler’, Aslam Qureshi, Mohsin, Bablu, and Shamshad, surrendered before the court on the day of the verdict, while Salim surrendered a day later. All the accused had been out on bail before their conviction.

The court imposed multiple sections of the Indian Penal Code (IPC) on the convicted individuals, including Section 302 (murder), which mandates life imprisonment, and Section 307 (attempt to murder), which carries a 10-year sentence. Additional charges included rioting under Sections 147 (rioting) and 148 (rioting, armed with deadly weapon), wrongful restraint under Section 341, and criminal intimidation under Section 506. The Prevention of Insult to National Honour Act, 1971, was also invoked, penalizing the convicted under Section 124K for insulting the national flag.

Under the Arms Act, Salim received a seven-year sentence for using firearms, while Mohsin, Rahat, Wasim, Bablu, and others were sentenced to three years for illegal possession of arms. These sentences are set to run concurrently with the life imprisonment handed down under the IPC. The Supreme Court upheld the trial conducted by the NIA court, dismissing a petition challenging its jurisdiction.
