= Cellular Operators Association of India =

COAI
- Formation: 1995; 31 years ago
- Type: Non-governmental trade association
- Legal status: Active
- Purpose: Policy advocacy
- Headquarters: 14, Bhai Veer Singh Marg, Sector 4, Gole Market, New Delhi, India
- Region served: India
- Fields: Telecommunications
- Chairman: Ajai Puri
- Vice Chairman: Pramod K Mittal
- Director General: Dr. S.P. Kochhar
- Website: www.coai.com

The Cellular Operators Association of India (COAI) is an Indian non-governmental trade association and advocacy group focused mainly on telecommunications industry. COAI was constituted in 1995 as a registered, non-governmental society. As of 2017, COAI has been (jointly) organizing the India Mobile Congress with the Department of Telecommunications, Government of India.

== About COAI ==
Over the years COAI has emerged as the official voice for the Indian telecom industry and interacts directly with Ministries, Policy Makers, Regulators, Financial Institutions and Technical Bodies. It provides a forum for discussion and exchange of ideas between these bodies and the Service Providers, who share a common interest in the development of mobile telephony in the country. COAI collaborates with other Industry Associations such as CII, FICCI, ASSOCHAM, ISPAI, VSAT, IAMAI association etc., with the objective of presenting an industry consensus view to the Government on crucial issues relating to the growth and development of the Indian telecom Industry. Recently the COAI has set up the 5G India Forum (5GIF).

COAI expanded its membership base to include four other telecom companies, namely CISCO India, Huawei Technologies, Qualcomm and Alcatel Lucent as associate members.

== Members ==
The core members of the COAI are:

- Bharti Airtel
- Vodafone Idea Limited
- Reliance Jio Infocomm

The associate members of the COAI are:

- ACT Fibernet
- Apple India Pvt Ltd
- Amazon India
- Ciena
- Cisco
- Connect Broadband
- Ericsson
- ECI Telecom
- Facebook
- Google
- Huawei
- IBM India
- Indus Towers
- Juniper Networks
- Nokia
- Qualcomm
- Sterlite Technologies
- Tata Teleservices Ltd
- ZTE India

== Events ==
COAI organizes the India Mobile Congress in association with the Department of Telecommunications (DoT) on an annual basis in New Delhi, India. The event attracts international attention and participation. So far, the following events have been organized: India Mobile Congress 2017, India Mobile Congress 2018 and India Mobile Congress 2019.
