= Bhaiyyu Maharaj =

Indian spiritual guru (1968-2018)

- Born: Uday Singh Deshmukh; 29 April 1968; Shujalpur, Madhya Pradesh, India
- Died: 12 June 2018 (aged 50); Indore, Madhya Pradesh, India
- Cause of death: Self-inflicted gunshot to head
- Occupation: Spiritual guru

Bhaiyyu Maharaj (29 April 1968 – 12 June 2018), born Uday Singh Deshmukh, was a spiritual guru from Indore in the Indian state of Madhya Pradesh and Maharashtra.

== Personal life ==
Maharaj was born Uday Singh Deshmukh on 29 April 1968 in Shujalpur, Madhya Pradesh. He was born in a family of land owner agriculturists and worked in the past as a professional model.

His first wife Madhavi Deshmukh died in 2015 and they had a daughter Kuhoo Deshmukh. In 2017, he married Ayushi Sharma.

== Public life ==
Although Bhaiyyu was based in Indore, he was a popular leader in Maharashtra and Madhya Pradesh because of his spiritual and social works. A follower of Hindu deity Dattatreya, he was also called "Yuva Rashtra Sant".

His followers consisted of Maharashtra CM Devendra Fadnavis, Lata Mangeshkar et al. He was also reported to be a consultant to union ministers Sushil Kumar Shinde and Vilasrao Deshmukh.

During the Anti Corruption movement led by Anna Hazare for a Lokpal or corruption watchdog, he played the role of a mediator for the Congress government in preparing a draft of Lokpal bill, which was acceptable to both the parties.

In April 2018, he was offered Minister of State (MoS) post by BJP led Madhya Pradesh Government along with four more spiritual leaders, after being inducted as members of a committee set up for the conservation of the Narmada river. However, Bhaiyyu declined the offer and mentioned in an interview to have no inclination towards any particular party or community.

In 2018, Maharaj called for Narmada Ghotala Rath Yatra,(Narmada river scam procession), a public agitation with a purpose of exposing the BJP led Madhya Pradesh government's alleged corruption in the Narmada sand mining scams. The agitation was later called off.

== Death ==
On 12 June 2018, Maharaj shot himself in the head at his residence in Indore. He was taken to the Bombay Hospital in Indore where he died due to his injuries. His elder daughter Kuhu, performed the Antyesti (last rites).

Additional Director General of Police (ADG) had said that a case of probable domestic discord has come up but that they will investigate all angles of his death.

The Congress party has demanded a CBI probe into his death.
