= Gadchinchale =

Village in Maharashtra

- village
- Location in Maharashtra, India Gadchinchale (India)
- Coordinates: 20.0843517°N 73.0611882°E
- Country: India
- State: Maharashtra
- District: Palghar
- Taluka: Dahanu
- Elevation: 162 m (531 ft)

Population (2011)
  - Total: 1,208
- Time zone: UTC+5:30 (IST)
- ISO 3166 code: IN-MH
- 2011 census code: 551629

Gadchinchale is a village in the Palghar district of Maharashtra, India. It is located in the Dahanu taluka.

== Demographics ==
According to the 2011 census of India, Gadchinchale has 248 households. The effective literacy rate (i.e. the literacy rate of population excluding children aged 6 and below) is 30.42%.

Demographics (2011 Census)
	Total	Male	Female
Population	1208	572	636
Children aged below 6 years	248	119	129
Scheduled caste	1	0	1
Scheduled tribe	1198	567	631
Literates	292	171	121
Workers (all)	637	313	324
Main workers (total)	518	268	250
Main workers: Cultivators	428	229	199
Main workers: Agricultural labourers	39	16	23
Main workers: Household industry workers	7	3	4
Main workers: Other	44	20	24
Marginal workers (total)	119	45	74
Marginal workers: Cultivators	9	3	6
Marginal workers: Agricultural labourers	93	38	55
Marginal workers: Household industry workers	0	0	0
Marginal workers: Others	17	4	13
Non-workers	571	259	312

== See also ==
- 2020 Palghar mob lynching
