= 2018 Karbi Anglong lynching =

Mob lynching incident in Assam, India

- Location: Panijuri, Karbi Anglong, Assam
- Date: June 8, 2018; 8 years ago
- Attack type: Lynching
- Deaths: 2
- Victims: Nilotpal Das and Abhijit Nath
- Perpetrator: 250 people
- Accused: 28 people

The 2018 Karbi Anglong lynching was a violent incident of mob lynching that took place in Karbi Anglong, Assam, in India on 8 June 2018.

== Fake news ==
Fake news spread via WhatsApp have been named as the cause of the lynchings of Nilotpal Das and Abhijit Nath. The rumors said that child lifters were in the area.

== Incident ==
The incident took place in the backdrop of widespread public rumours over rising child trafficking and the spate of killings known as the Indian WhatsApp lynchings. A mob of about 250 people attacked two men under suspicion of child trafficking and beat the two to death in a case of mistaken identity.

== Arrests ==
As of 21 June 2018, 36 people had been arrested.
