= John Wingett Davies =

British company director

John Wingett Davies OBE (1908 – 11 September 1992) was a British company director in the fields of ship broking, aviation, and films, whose main interest was as an exhibitor in the world of cinema.

He was managing director of Davies Cinemas Ltd and chairman of British Cinematograph Theatres, Deputy Chairman of Davies and Newman, the parent company of Dan-Air, and President of the Cinema Exhibitors' Association.

== Life ==
The son of William Davies, a sea captain and ship-broker, the young Davies was born in London and educated at Marlborough College and Whitgift School, then became a broker in his father's firm, Davies and Newman. In July 1928, when the Davies family was living at Coopersale Hall, Epping, his younger sister, Letitia, married F. C. Chalklin, a research physicist of Hadlow, at St Clement Danes, Strand, London, and a year later his older sister Mary Frances married Geoffrey Gillam and went on to have three sons.

In 1931 Davies entered the cinema business and became a member of the London branch committee of the Cinema Exhibitors' Association, going on to be elected as its chairman and as a delegate to the General Council. In 1947, he was managing director of Davies Cinemas Ltd, with offices at 26–27, D'Arblay Street, London W1. In 1952 he was vice-president of the CEA and President in 1953–54. In 1974 he was Director of F.I.D.O.

After his father's death in 1936, Davies was a major shareholder in Davies and Newman and took a seat on the board. By 1971, he was deputy chairman, under the chairmanship of Frederick Newman. In that year, 1971, the Davies and Newman Group was floated on the London Stock Exchange, having become more important thanks to the success of its subsidiary Dan-Air.

Davies was also chairman of British Cinematograph Theatres Ltd, and in the 1977 New Year Honours he was appointed OBE for services to the Cinematograph Films Council. He retired in 1984 and died in September 1991, leaving an estate valued at £614,274. At the time of his death he was living at 45, Melbury Road, West Kensington, London W14.

== Private life ==
In 1931, Davies married Elizabeth Mary Mann, at Epping. Their son Richard William was born in 1933, a daughter, Diana Wingett, in 1938, and a second son, Michael John, in 1946.

Davies was a nephew of Sir Joseph Davies (1866–1954), a business man and Liberal politician, and acted as Executor of his uncle's will.
