= Pixley =

Pixley may refer to:

Placenames

- Pixley, California, USA
- Pixley, Kansas, USA
- Pixley, Herefordshire, England
- Pixley, Shropshire, England
- Pixley, Wyoming, USA
- Pixley (Green Acres), fictional place in USA

Surname

- Pixley (surname)

Given Name

- Pixley ka Isaka Seme (1881-1951), a founder and President of the African National Congress
