= Christ Church Cathedral School =

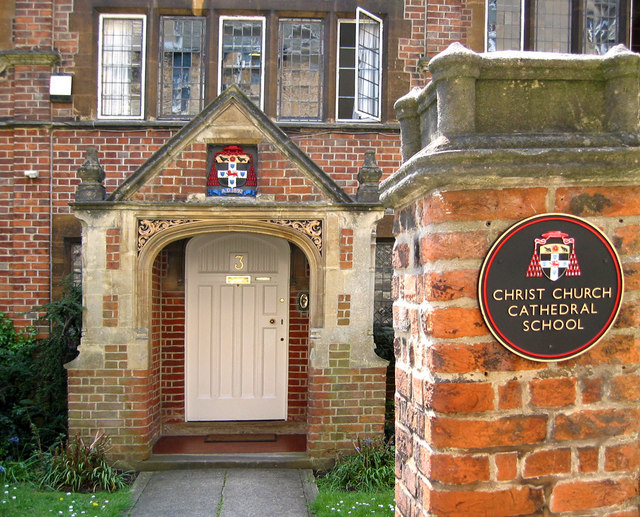

Location
- 3 Brewer Street; Oxford, OX1 1QW; England
- 51.7497°N 1.2578°W

Information
- Type: Private day and boarding school Choral foundation school Cathedral school
- Religious affiliation: Church of England
- Established: 1546; 480 years ago
- Founder: Henry VIII of England
- Local authority: Oxfordshire
- Department for Education URN: 123287 Tables
- Ofsted: Reports
- Chair of the Governors: Sarah Foot, Dean of Christ Church
- Headmaster: Richard Murray
- Gender: Boys
- Age: 3 to 13
- Enrolment: 160
- Website: http://www.christchurchcathedralschool.org.uk/

Location of Christ Church Cathedral School within central Oxford

Christ Church Cathedral School is an independent preparatory school for boys in Oxford, England. It is one of three choral foundation schools in the city and educates choristers of Christ Church Cathedral, and the Chapels of Worcester College and Pembroke College. It is a member of the IAPS and the Choir Schools Association.

== History ==
Now a Church of England School, it was originally housed within the College itself. Today its premises are located across from Christ Church at 3 Brewer Street and Cardinal Wolsey's house is still used for teaching.

In the 19th century, the Dean of Christ Church, Henry Liddell (father of Alice, who was immortalised in the books of Lewis Carroll) arranged for the building of a new choir school on its present site.

In 1938, Wilfrid Oldaker took over as headmaster, finding a school with only nineteen boarders, and set out to enlarge it, roughly trebling the school's size in five years. He was resisted in this by the Dean and Chapter, who did not want a larger prep school on their hands. Oldaker made other big changes, such as joining the IAPS, which meant preparing all boys for Common Entrance, appointing prefects, dividing the school into houses called Wolsey, Sayers, and Carroll, and introducing the teaching of Greek. In 1939, he launched a school magazine called The Cardinal's Hat. In 1945, Oldaker moved on to King's School, Canterbury, with Oxford seeing the move as being caused by the Dean and Chapter giving him little support in his development plans.

More recent developments include the opening of a Pre-Prep department and nursery, and the William Walton Centre which comprises several classrooms and teaching facilities. At this point, the school began to take admit non-chorister pupils as well. The school opened a pre-preparatory department in 1984 and a nursery in 1998.

== The school today ==
All pupils are boys, except a small number of girls in the nursery. The 14 boarders are choristers or probationary choristers for the Cathedral. The dormitories in which they sleep are named after distinguished former organists including Ley, Taverner, Armstrong and Harwood. All other pupils are day boys, among them eighteen choristers who sing in Worcester College Chapel. The school used to provide choristers for Exeter College but this ended when Exeter established a mixed choir. In addition to the focus on Music, there is also a distinguished tradition of Art, and the school contributes an annual exhibition to Oxford's Artweeks festival. In 2019, the school also started providing choristers for the Pembroke college choir.

Leavers typically move on to local schools such as Magdalen College School, Oxford, Abingdon School, St Edward's School, Oxford, Bloxham School and D'Overbroeck's College Leckford Place. There is also a tradition of choristers winning Music Scholarships to destinations further afield, which in recent years have included Radley College, Harrow School, Uppingham School, Eton College, Sherborne School and Wellington College.

== Notable headmasters ==
- Wilfrid Oldaker, 1938 to 1945

== Notable alumni ==
- Simon Carrington – conductor and founding member of the a cappella group King's Singers
- Joscelyn Godwin – musicologist
- Toby Jones – actor
- Jan Morris – author and historian
- Crispin Nash-Williams – mathematician
- Dorothy L. Sayers – novelist, was born at the school during her father's time as Headmaster
- Sir William Walton, OM – composer
- Eric Whelpton – writer and lecturer
- Roderick Williams – composer and singer
