= Wilfrid Oldaker =

Clergyman, classical scholar, author, schoolmaster (1901–1978)

Wilfrid Horace Oldaker (13 June 1901 – 28 September 1978) was a clergyman of the Church of England, classical scholar, author, schoolmaster, Chaplain at Clifton College, Precentor of Christ Church Cathedral, Oxford, headmaster of Christ Church Cathedral School, and head of the Junior School at King's School, Canterbury.

== Early life ==
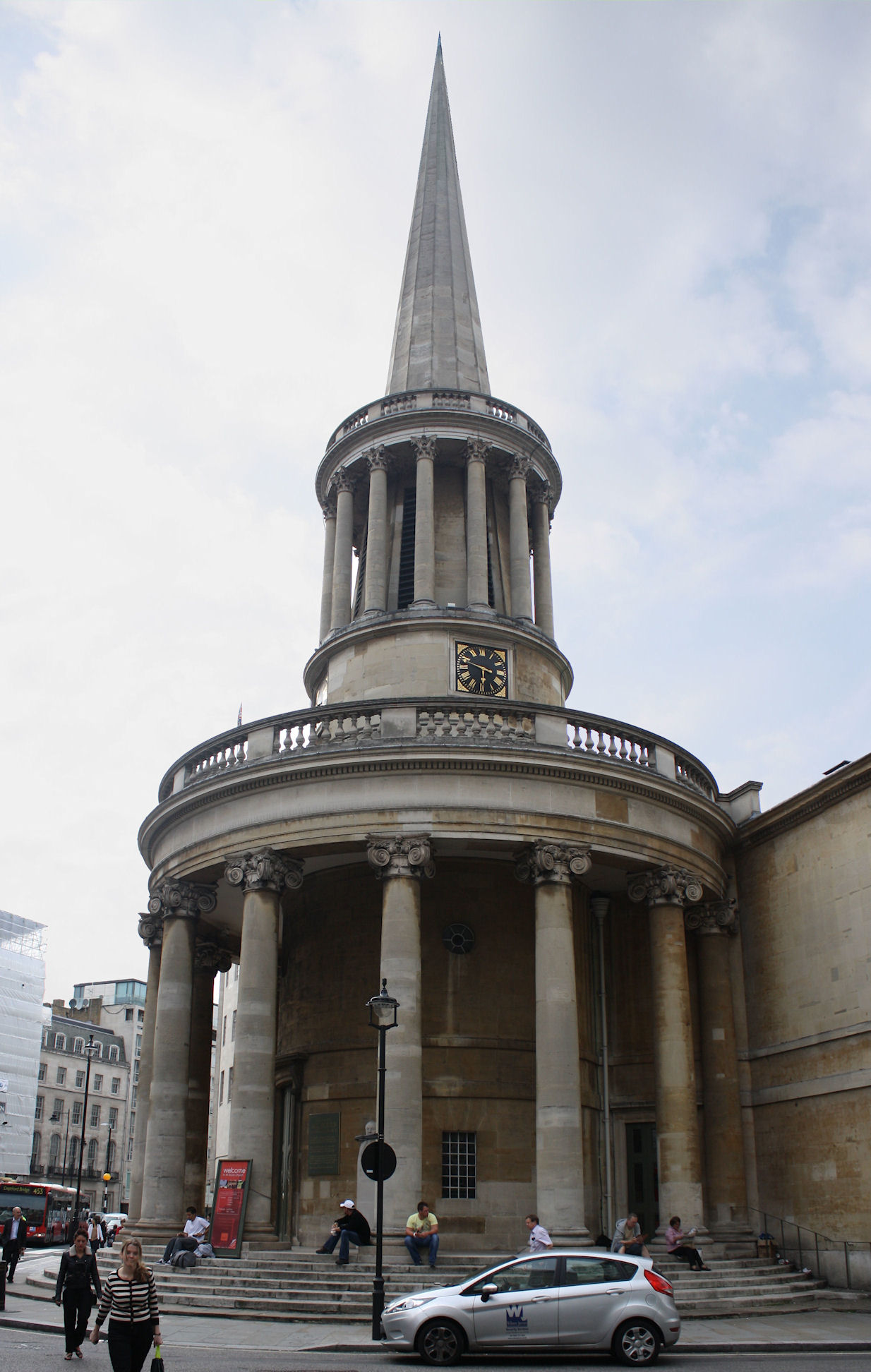
All Souls, Langham Place

Born in Wandsworth, the son of Horace Charles Oldaker by his marriage in 1899 to Winifred Chester Hughes, Oldaker had two sisters, Margaret Laetitia, born in 1903, and Nancy Blanche, born in 1908. He was educated at Dulwich College, where he gained a scholarship in 1914, for which he was prepared by the Rev. W. R. M. Leake of Dulwich, and then at Wadham College, Oxford, where he was again a scholar, graduating BA in 1924 and being promoted to MA in 1927. At Oxford, he was a Second Lieutenant in the Officers' Training Corps.

His father, born in Treville, Herefordshire, later lived in Thornton Avenue, Streatham, where Oldaker was briefly a curate. His father's parents were Thomas Allies Oldaker, an estate agent originally from Pershore, Worcestershire, and Letitia Capel Pulley, from Hackney. His grandmother was a sister of Sir Joseph Pulley, 1st Baronet (1822–1901), member of parliament for Hereford.

On 21 September 1929, at All Souls, Langham Place, Oldaker officiated at the wedding of his cousin Mary Frances Oldaker Davies, daughter of Captain William Davies, to Geoffrey Gillam, assisted by the Rev. Arthur Buxton.

== Early career ==
After the university, Oldaker became a schoolmaster. In 1924 he got his first job at Rossall School, and in December 1924 his Officers Training Corps commission was transferred to the Rossall School contingent. The next year, he migrated to Worksop College, where he taught from 1925 to 1929. In 1927 he was ordained as a deacon of the Church of England and licensed as a public preacher, and then the next year was ordained as a priest.

In 1926, Oldaker wrote from Worksop to the editor of The Gramophone, Compton Mackenzie, praising a music festival he had recently attended in Germany. In November of the same year he resigned his commission as a Second Lieutenant in the Worksop College Officers' Training Corps on the grounds of ill health, and until 1929 was active there instead as a scout leader. He left the school in 1929 to take up parish work, and in 1930 was acting Curate of St Leon with All Saints, Streatham, but in 1931 was appointed as Chaplain and assistant schoolmaster at Clifton College, where he remained until 1938.

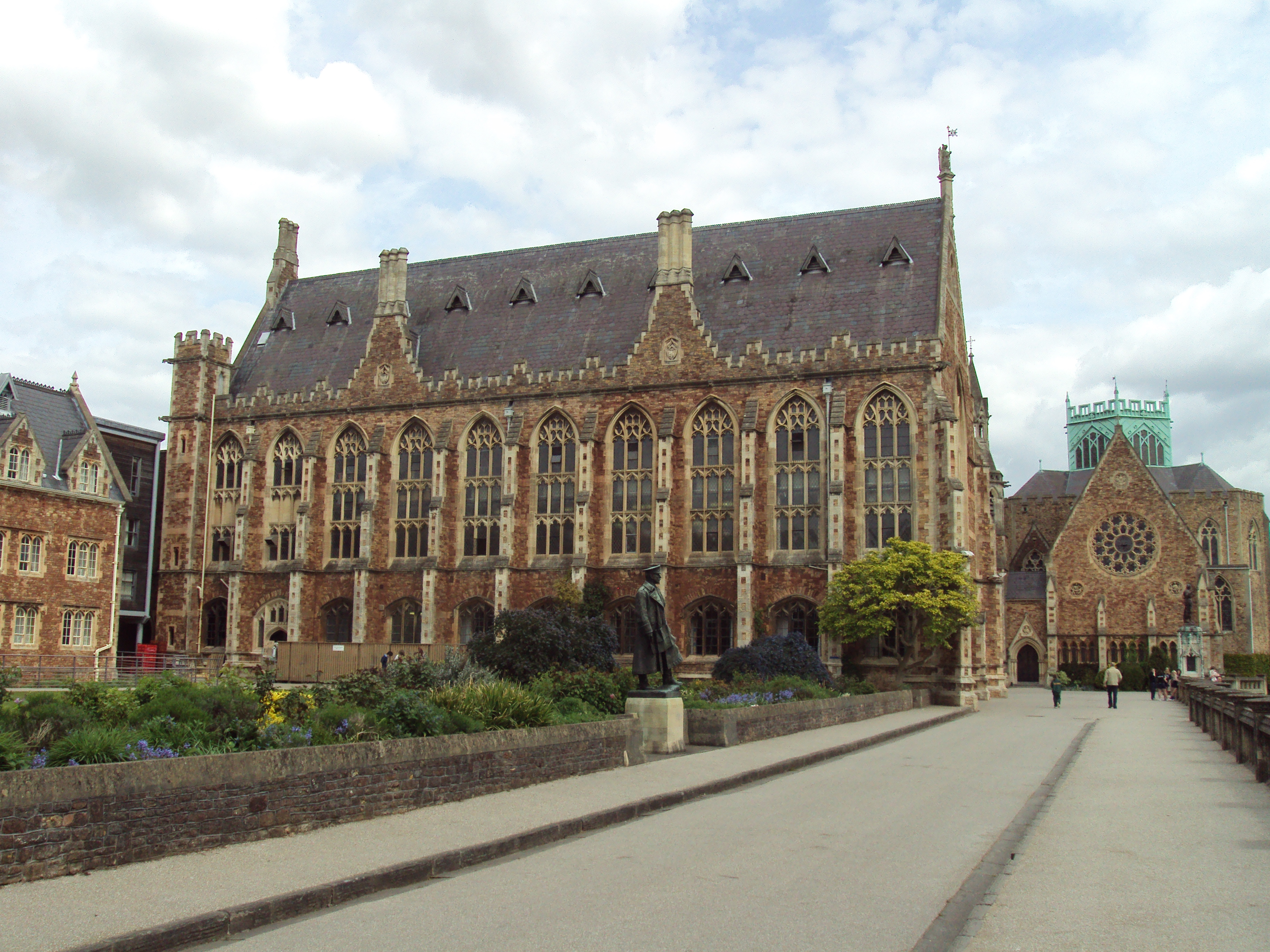
The Chapel at Clifton College

In October 1936, Oldaker gave a talk to the English Association on "Elizabethan Music, with special reference to the Songs in the Dramas". An article in The Musical Times in December 1937 noted a performance of the Bristol Bach Society, at St Mary's Church House, in which Oldaker had sung solo in "God's time is best" and had also played second flute in Bach's B minor Suite for flute and orchestra.

== Writer ==
Oldaker's first book was a study of The Birds of Aristophanes, printed in 1926 by the Cambridge University Press, including scenes from the play, with his introduction, notes, and a vocabulary.

In 1934, an article by Oldaker, "Greek Fables and Babrius", was published in the Classical Association's journal Greece & Rome, noting that "Probability is against Aesop having written down his own fables." In an article called "Public School Sermons" in July 1935, he recounted the story of a visiting preacher at Harrow School who told the boys that life was a game of cricket, in which there were three wickets, Honour, Truth, and Purity, with Temptation as the bowler. He adds "I do not know whether this is a warning against the use of sporting metaphors in the pulpit, or merely a warning that if used, they should be used correctly."

In 1937, Oldaker's second book, Martial: Selected Easy Epigrams, annotated some epigrams of Martial, with appendices, and was published by Martin Hopkinson & Co.

In "Translating Poetry (A Grumble in Five Languages)", February 1938, he sought to analyse the difficulties of literary translation, commenting that "Language varies from language in so many things besides words." In June 1938, Oldaker published an article on "Public School Religion", addressing two recent pamphlets, "The Parish Church and the Fifth Form", by Anon., and "Against the Shepherds", by "Colin Clout". Oldaker commented "It betrays no hostile spirit to say that the pamphlets are, from their very nature, self-revealing. The authors of both are obviously of much the same type. They are young and progressive... I should doubt whether they have either of them been to one of the larger boarding-schools as boys."

In 1938, while serving as Chaplain at Clifton College, he published Old Testament Prophecy: a School Certificate Course. In 1944, the Society for Promoting Christian Knowledge published his The Background of the Life of Jesus, and in 1953 came a new edition of his Scenes from the Birds of Aristophanes.

== Headmaster ==
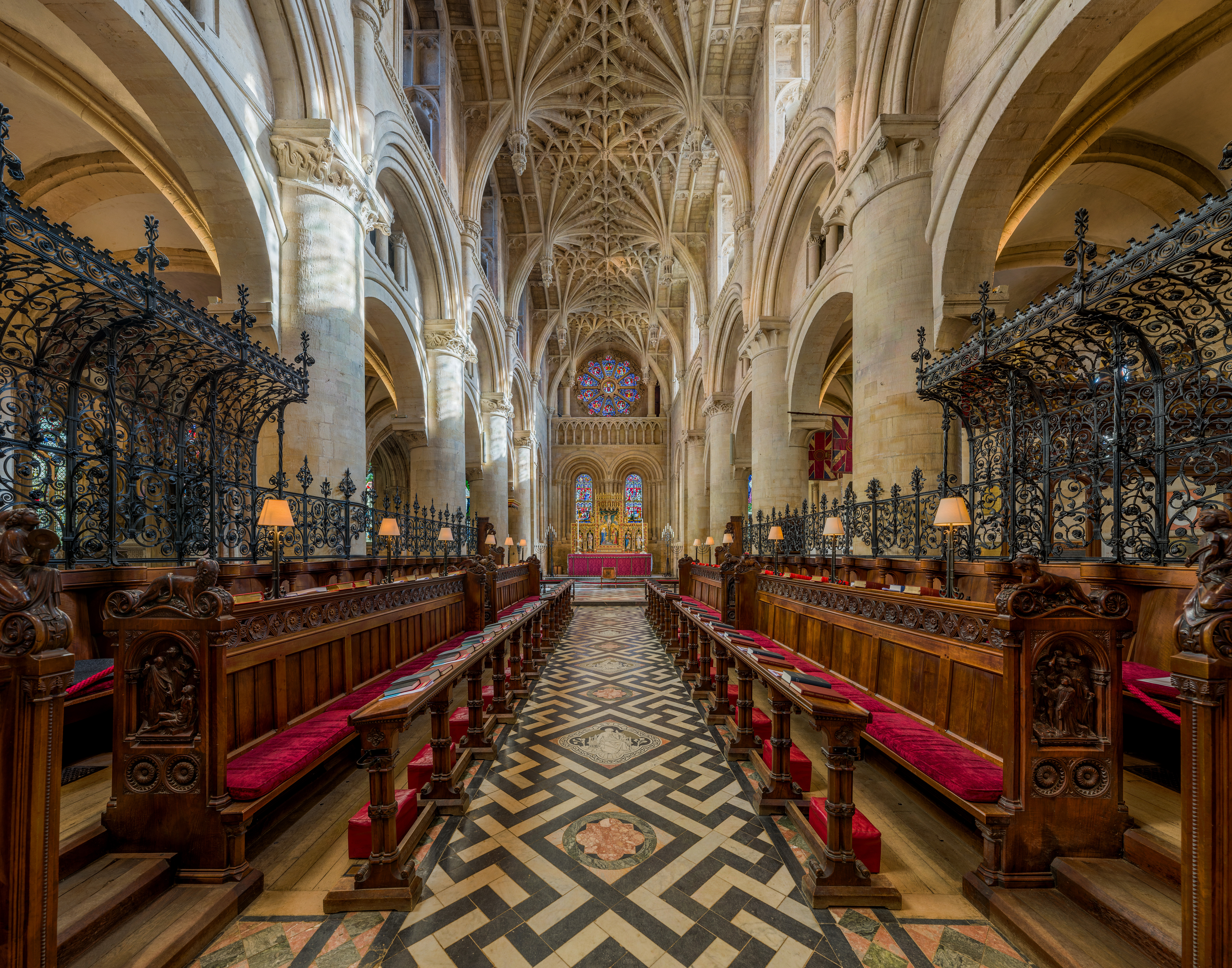
The choir of Christ Church Cathedral, Oxford

In 1938, Oldaker was appointed as Precentor of Christ Church, Oxford, a role which included serving as Master of the Christ Church Cathedral Choir School. He arrived there in September, quickly gaining the nickname of "Pip", believed to have been inspired by the name of a Daily Mail cartoon strip called "Pip, Squeak, and Wilfred", in which Pip was a dog.

He made big changes at his new school, joining the Incorporated Association of Preparatory Schools, which meant that all boys had to be prepared for the Common Entrance Examination. He began to appoint boys as prefects, which was new, and he also divided the school into houses, called Wolsey, Aldridge, and Carroll. He introduced the teaching of Ancient Greek and changed the name of the school slightly, insisting that the word "Choir" was not needed. In December 1939 he launched a school magazine called The Cardinal's Hat, including news of old boys. The greatest change he made was trebling the size of the school. On his arrival, the number of boarders was only nineteen, but a year later it was thirty-four, and by 1943 there were sixty-eight boys altogether. Oldaker was resisted in this enlargement by the Dean and Chapter, who did not want a larger prep school on their hands, but he was able to make use of the time-honoured prerogative of the Master of the school to be allowed to take private pupils, in addition to the Cathedral choristers.

In 1941 Oldaker was the Orator for an annual lecture to the Curators and staff of the Bodleian Library, bringing with him the choristers. The lecture was then devoted in alternate years to the honouring of Sir Thomas Bodley and the encouragement of Hebrew studies, and Oldaker took on both.

Oldaker married Margaret J. Dickson in Oxford in 1941.

One of the boys Oldaker taught at the Cathedral School was Crispin Nash-Williams, whose biographer has said that he was a formative influence on Nash-Williams.

In 1945, Oldaker moved on to King's School, Canterbury, accepting an invitation from Canon John Shirley to take charge of the junior school, Milner Court, at Sturry. One reason for the move was believed in Oxford to be that the Dean and Chapter of Christ Church were giving him little support in his ambitious development plans.

In 1946 Oldaker wrote to Country Life from Sturry about the tithe barn there, which was 160 feet long, asking "And can anyone tell us where the largest tithe barn is?" The editor replied that this was "the gigantic barn at Abbotsbury, 276 ft. long."

While at Sturry, Oldaker and his wife lived in the manor house until moving into a cottage in the grounds, so that the main house could be used to expand the school. A history by D. E. Edwards comments that Oldaker achieved a lot while there, concentrating on the academic and musical sides of his school, while not neglecting games. In 1956, he retired from the world of education, to become a parish priest in Devon.

== Later life ==
Oldaker was Curate of Elton, Bury, from 1961 to 1963, when he moved to 58, Velwell Road, Exeter.

He died in September 1978, when his address was given as Copper Beech, New Road, Cranbrook, Kent, leaving an estate valued at £9,053. His widow survived him until 1992.

== Publications ==
- Wilfrid H. Oldaker, Scenes from the Birds of Aristophanes, with Introduction, Notes, Vocabulary, and Appendices (Cambridge University Press, 1926; new edition, 1953)
- W. H. Oldaker, "Greek Fables and Babrius" in Greece & Rome, Vol. 3, Issue 8 (Classical Association, February 1934), pp. 85–93
- W. H. Oldaker, "Translating Poetry (A Grumble in Five Languages)" in Greece & Rome, Vol. 7, No. 20 (February 1938), pp. 86–100
- Wilfrid Horace Oldaker, Martial: Selected Easy Epigrams; with Introduction, Notes, Appendices, and Vocabulary (London: Martin Hopkinson & Co., 1937)
- W. H. Oldaker, Old Testament Prophecy: a School Certificate Course Part 1 (London: Martin Hopkinson & Co., 1938)
- W. H. Oldaker, Old Testament Prophecy: a School Certificate Course Part 2 (London: Martin Hopkinson & Co., 1938)
- W. H. Oldaker, The Background of the Life of Jesus (SPCK 1944)
- W. H. Oldaker, "Delius and the Lost Chord" in Delius Society Newsletter no. 41 (1973), 21–22
