= William Davies (master mariner) =

British sea captain, businessman

Captain William Davies MBE (1862 – 27 March 1936) was a British sea captain and business man, a founding partner in the City of London shipping company Davies and Newman and Chairman of the London General Shipowners Society.

His Petroleum Tables (1903), a standard reference work for tanker officers, went into several editions and was still the best-known book on its subject in the 1930s. During the First World War, Davies worked with the Admiralty on tanker transportation and was rewarded with the Order of the British Empire.

== Early life ==
Born in Bristol, Davies was the son of Thomas Seth Davies, master mariner, originally from Pembrokeshire, Wales, and his wife Julia. In 1871, the family was living in Fremantle Square, Cotham, and Davies and his younger brother Joseph were at school.

In June 1885, Davies's father died at sea.

== Career ==
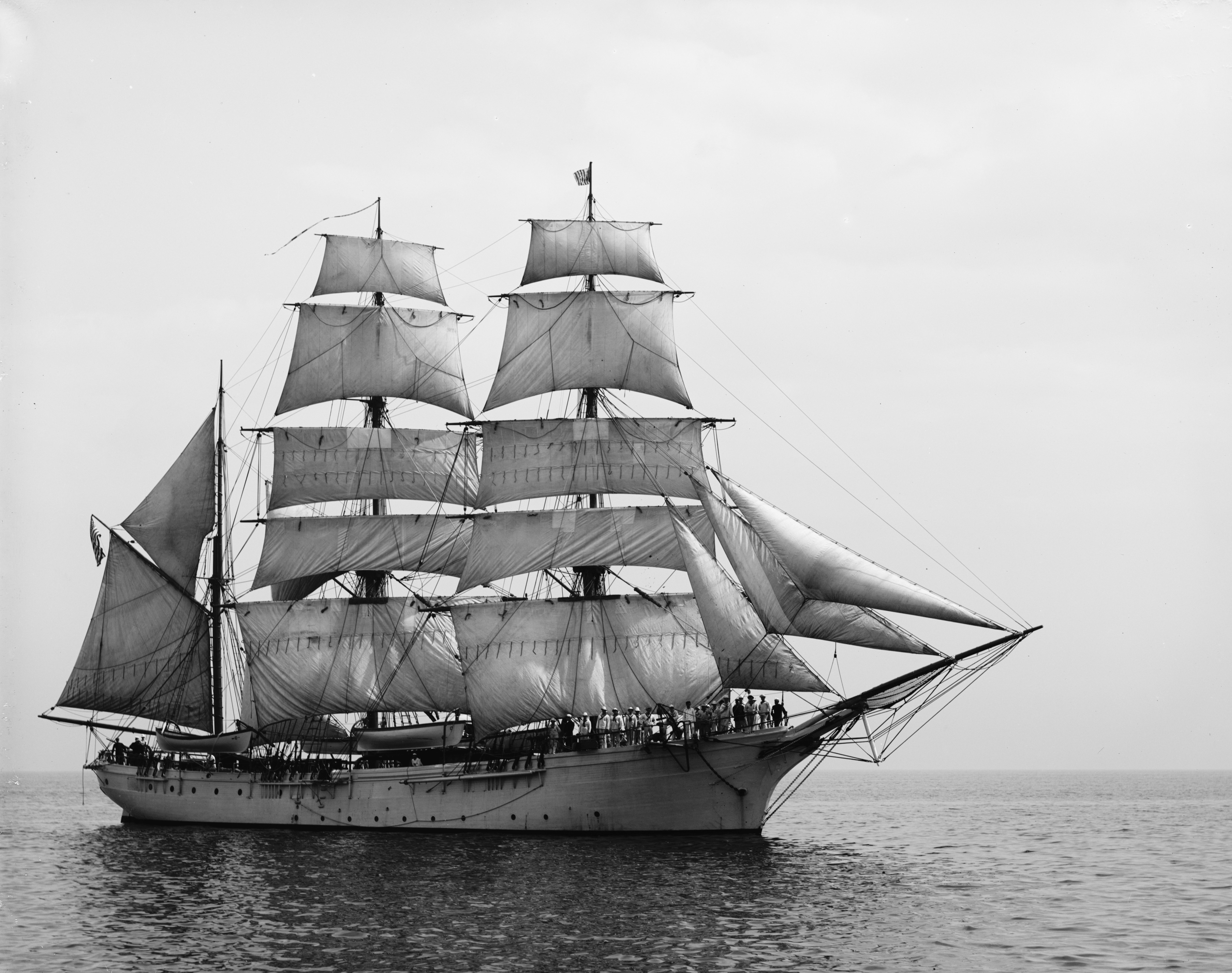
A barque in 1878

Davies went to sea in 1875, shipping as a boy in a Welsh barque. He got his Master's Certificate in 1885 and his Extra Master's Certificate in 1887, bringing with it the title of master mariner. He quickly specialized in the new business of moving bulk oil across the Atlantic and around the world, which led to his observations on the expansion of oils in tankers. In 1903 he published his work, with other seafaring information, for the use of his fellow tanker officers.

By 1902, Davies was Marine Superintendent of the City of London shipping firm of Lane and MacAndrew.

Davies's book Petroleum Tables went into many editions. In 1915, The Petroleum World commented on it "We draw special attention to Capt. William Davies's Petroleum Tables, which is now stocked at the offices of The Petroleum World. This is the standard book for computations and conversions." It remained the best-known publication on the subject until the 1930s.

During the First World War, Davies worked closely with the Admiralty on tanker transportation, taking charge of all tanker movements at Le Havre. For this service, he was appointed as a Member of the Order of the British Empire.

In 1922, Davies went into partnership with a City of London tanker broker, Frank Newman, in a privately held shipping company called Davies and Newman, to carry on business as shipbrokers, oilbrokers, and tanker managers. They took over the interests of Lane and MacAndrew, of which Newman had been a director, which had become insolvent, and soon became a major force in the world of petroleum, while also operating in other areas of shipping.

In 1934, Davies was Chairman of the London General Shipowners Society, and in October 1934 he was a speaker at celebrations to mark the centenary of Lloyd's Register of Shipping. At the time of his death, he was also a member of the Tanker Pool Committee and had been connected with the bulk oil trade for almost fifty years.

== Private life ==
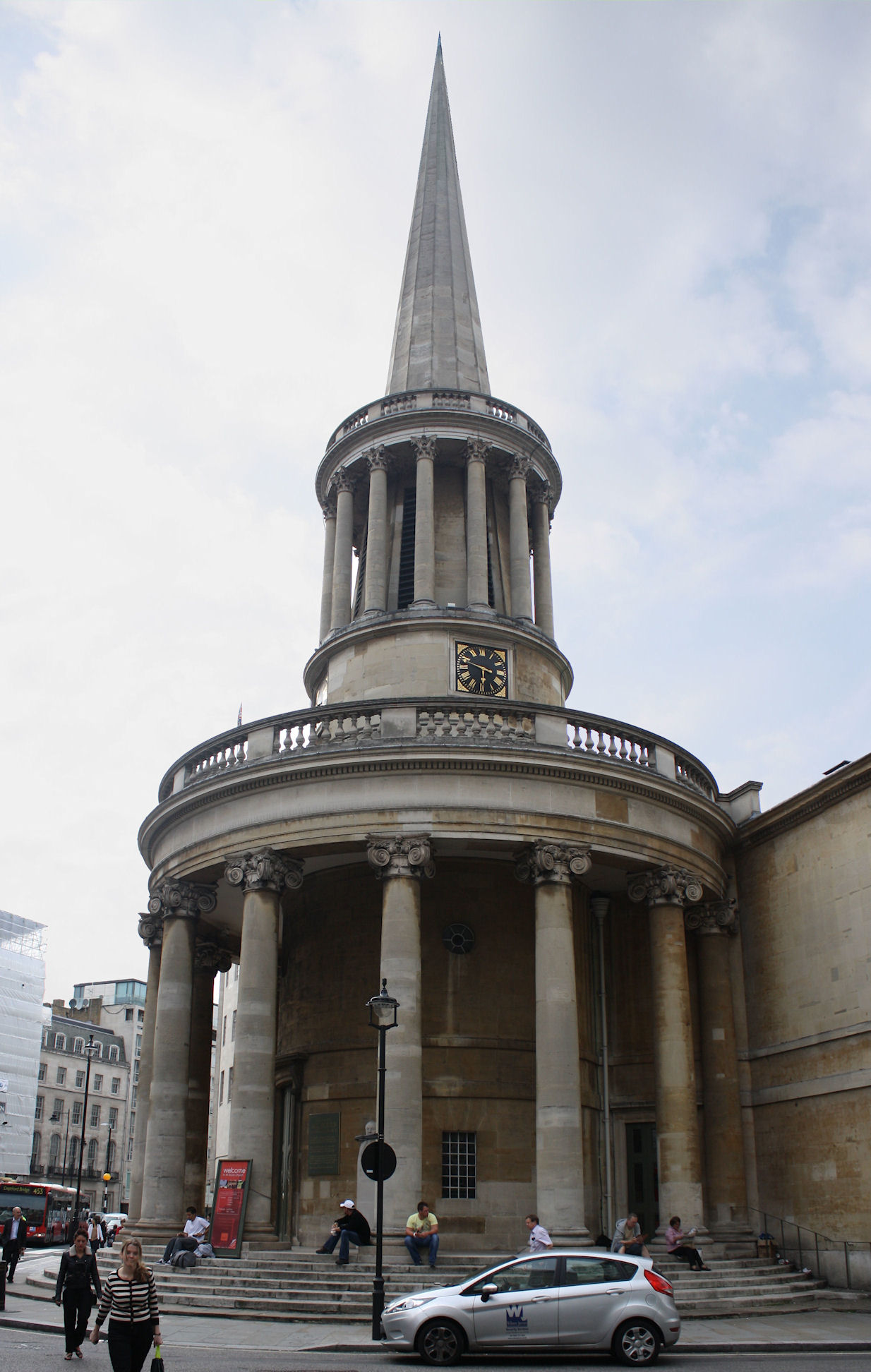
All Souls, Langham Place

In 1898, Davies married Mamie Souders, who died in October 1900 in Philadelphia, Pennsylvania.

In April 1902, at St John the Divine, Balham, Davies married secondly Emma Maud Oldaker, born in 1874, the daughter of Thomas A. Oldaker, an estate agent, by his marriage to Letitia Capel Pulley, a sister of Sir Joseph Pulley. They had three children, Mary Frances Oldaker Davies, born in 1903, Letitia Pulley Davies, born in 1905, and finally a son, John Wingett Davies, born in 1908, who later succeeded his father as a director of Davies and Newman and was Frederick Newman's deputy chairman at Dan-Air, a subsidiary of the shipping company.

On 2 July 1928, when the Davies family was living at Coopersale Hall, near Epping, their younger daughter, Letitia, married Dr Francis Cecil Chalklin, a research physicist, of Hadlow, at St Clement Danes, Strand, London. The two were working together in the Physics Laboratory at University College, London.

On 21 September 1929 the Davieses' older daughter, Mary, was married at All Souls Church, Langham Place, Marylebone, to Geoffrey Gillam, a young physician, by the Rev. Arthur Buxton, assisted by the bride's cousin, the Rev. Wilfrid Oldaker, with Captain Davies giving away the bride; there was a wedding reception at the nearby Langham Hotel. The Gillams went on to have three sons.

Davies died at the Beacon Hotel, Hindhead, Surrey, in 1936, aged 73, leaving a widow and an estate valued at £78,242, equivalent to £4,780,993 in 2025. His widow survived him until December 1951, ending her life living in a hotel at Caterham, Surrey.

== Publications ==
- William Davies, Petroleum Tables; being some useful Tables used for Ascertaining the Weights and Measures of Petroleum Cargoes, and a Table of Distances (London: Goodman, Burnham, and Company, 1903)
- William Davies Petroleum Tables (Dunn, Collins & Co., 1912, 5th edition)
