= Dan-Air Engineering =

Arm of Dan Air Services Limited

Dan Air Engineering
- Company type: Maintenance, Repair and Overhaul (MRO)
- Industry: Aviation
- Founded: 1954
- Fate: 1991 (sold to FLS Aerospace)
- Headquarters: Lasham Airfield
- Number of locations: Lasham Airfield (1954–1991); Manchester Airport (1976–1991); Gatwick Airport (1989–1991)
- Products: MRo, aircraft conversions, modifications
- Number of employees: 1,600+ (1989)
- Parent: Davies and Newman (1954–1971); Davies and Newman Holdings plc (Note: Davies and Newman Holdings Ltd prior to implementation of UK Companies Act 1980) (1971–1991)

Dan Air Engineering Limited was the maintenance arm of Dan Air Services Limited, itself a subsidiary of Davies and Newman, one of Britain's foremost wholly privately owned, independent (Note: independent from government-owned corporations) ship broking and airline companies during the 1970s and 80s.

Dan-Air Engineering was established in 1954 at Lasham Airfield to maintain the fledgling airline's rapidly growing fleet as well as to cater to the maintenance requirements of third parties.

The organisation embarked on a major expansion during the 1970s, following the introduction of several new aircraft types into its sister airline's fleet. This led to the opening of a new maintenance base at Manchester.

Further expansion followed in the 1980s, leading to the opening of a new widebody-capable maintenance facility at Gatwick, its sister airline's main operating base.

Following its sister airline's adoption of a new corporate strategy at the beginning of the 1990s, which resulted in a simpler, less maintenance-intensive fleet mix, Dan-Air Engineering was put up for sale as its capacity exceeded the sister airline's maintenance requirements by 45%.

FLS Aerospace acquired Dan-Air Engineering on 28 February 1991 for £27.5 million.

== History ==
Dan-Air's growing and varied fleet necessitated the development of a comprehensive 'in-house' maintenance capability from the start. This led to the establishment of sister company Dan-Air Engineering in 1954, the airline's second year of operation.

=== A new maintenance base ===
Following Dan-Air's acquisition of three Avro Yorks in 1954, the airline selected Lasham Airfield, a former Royal Air Force World War II airfield near the northeast Hampshire town of Basingstoke, as its maintenance base due to the ample availability of hangar space. (Meredith Air Transport, whose operation at Southend Dan-Air had taken over at the time of its formation, lacked adequate maintenance facilities at that airport. When the fledgling airline moved its operating base to Blackbushe in 1955, it continued to face a shortage of adequate maintenance facilities as Airwork, Britavia, Eagle, Silver City and Westminster Airways, whose presence at the airport predated Dan-Air's, had already occupied most of the available hangar space. Blackbushe's lack of space resulted from its earlier use as a military airfield where no provision had been made for future commercial operations. The airport's biggest drawback was its location on both sides of the A30 along the Hampshire-Surrey county border, with the terminal and apron to the north and the maintenance area to the south, and taxiways as well as one of the runways crossing it. This arrangement necessitated frequent closures of the busy road on account of aircraft moving across it, thereby preventing the efficient use of both road and airport as well as ruling out the latter's expansion.)

At the time, Lasham Airfield was in excellent condition, featuring a newly resurfaced runway and a large, empty hangar. (The Air Ministry had decided to upgrade the airfield following the end of the Berlin Airlift in preparation for further Cold War tensions.)

Eventually, Davies and Newman, the parent company of both the airline and its new engineering offshoot, managed to negotiate a 21-year lease of the airfield's maintenance facilities with the Air Ministry.

=== Major expansion in the 1970s and early to mid-1980s ===
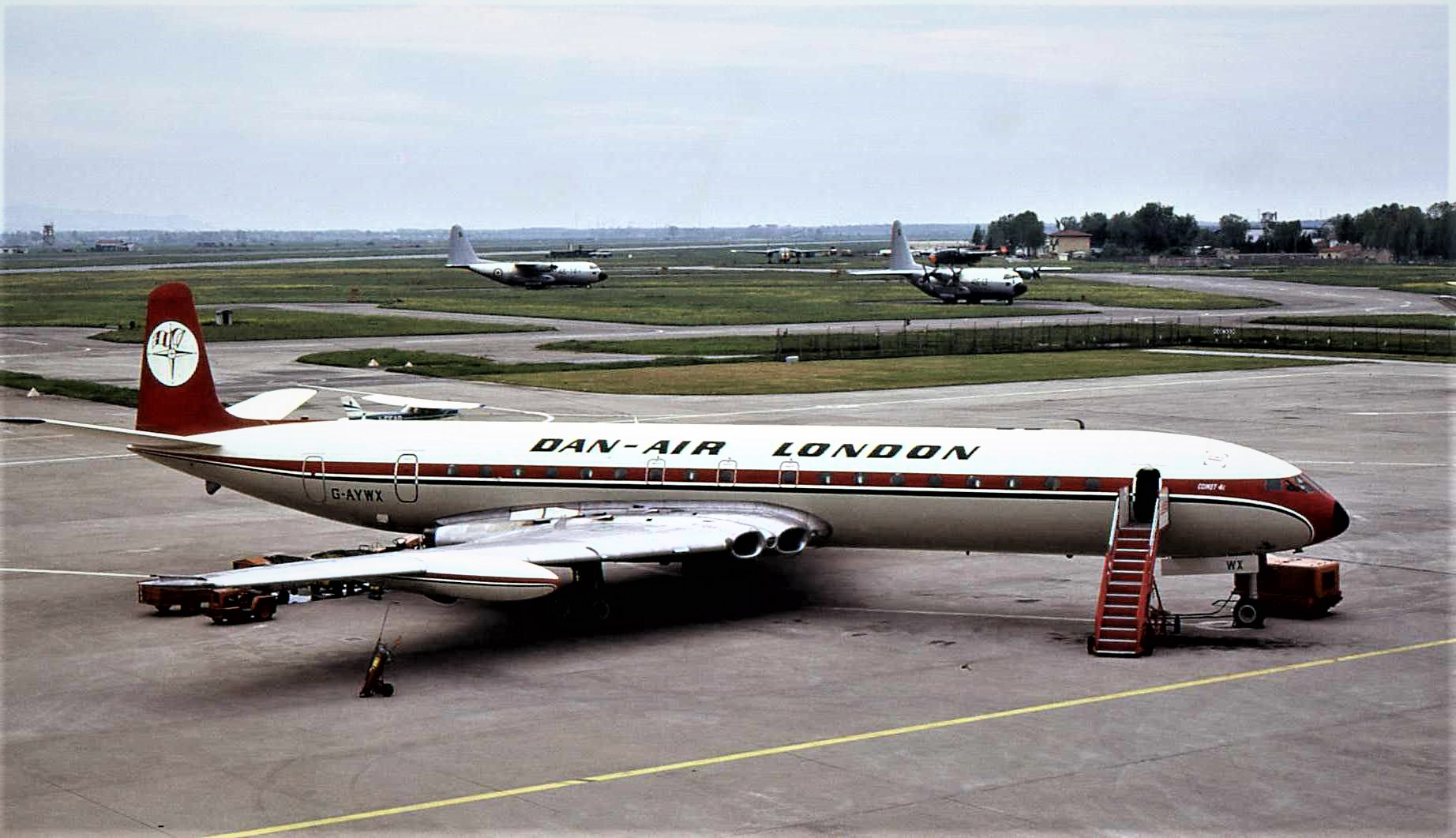
A de Havilland Comet 4C sister airline Dan-Air acquired from Kuwait Airways in 1971, seen here in 1974.

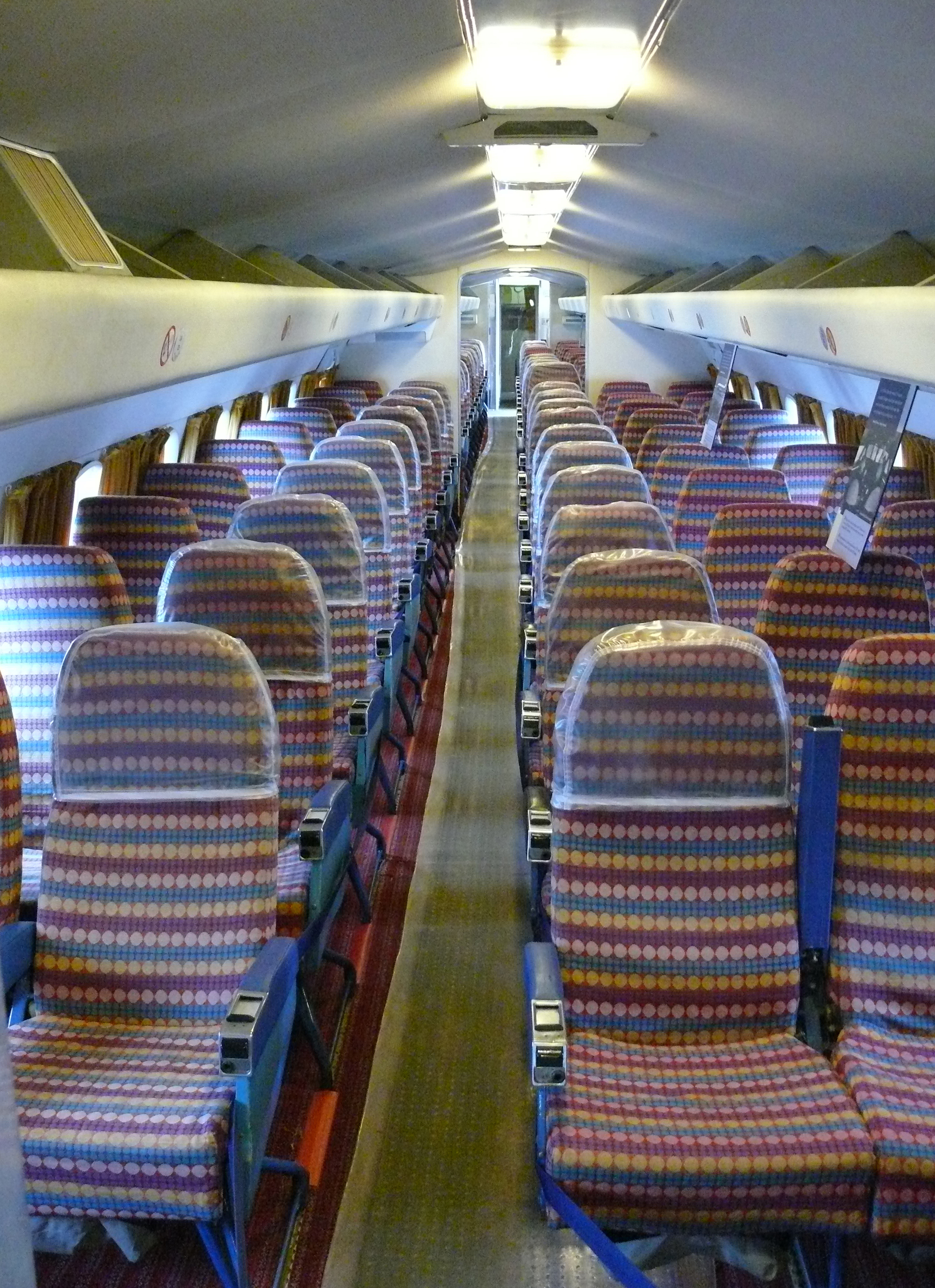
The interior of sister airline Dan-Air's Comet 4C G-BDIX, seen here on display at the National Museum of Flight, East Fortune, Scotland.

Dan-Air Engineering's first phase of major expansion occurred at Lasham, following sister company Dan-Air's purchase of a pair of de Havilland Comet series 4 jetliners from British Overseas Airways Corporation (BOAC) in 1966. These aircraft were ferried from BOAC's Heathrow base to Lasham during the early summer of that year for a six-month conversion by Dan-Air Engineering from a 74-seat, low-density, two-class long-haul scheduled configuration into a 106-seat, high-density, single-class short- to medium-haul inclusive tour (IT) layout. This conversion involved structurally "reinforcing" the aircraft — including strengthening the cabin floor and the wing roots – as they were expected to perform many more takeoffs and landings after entering service with Dan-Air (compared with their original role at BOAC). It also involved replacing internal doors with curtains as a weight-saving measure. Subsequently, acquired, larger Comet series 4B and 4C aircraft underwent similar structural modifications to enable them to carry up to 119 passengers before entering service with sister airline Dan-Air.

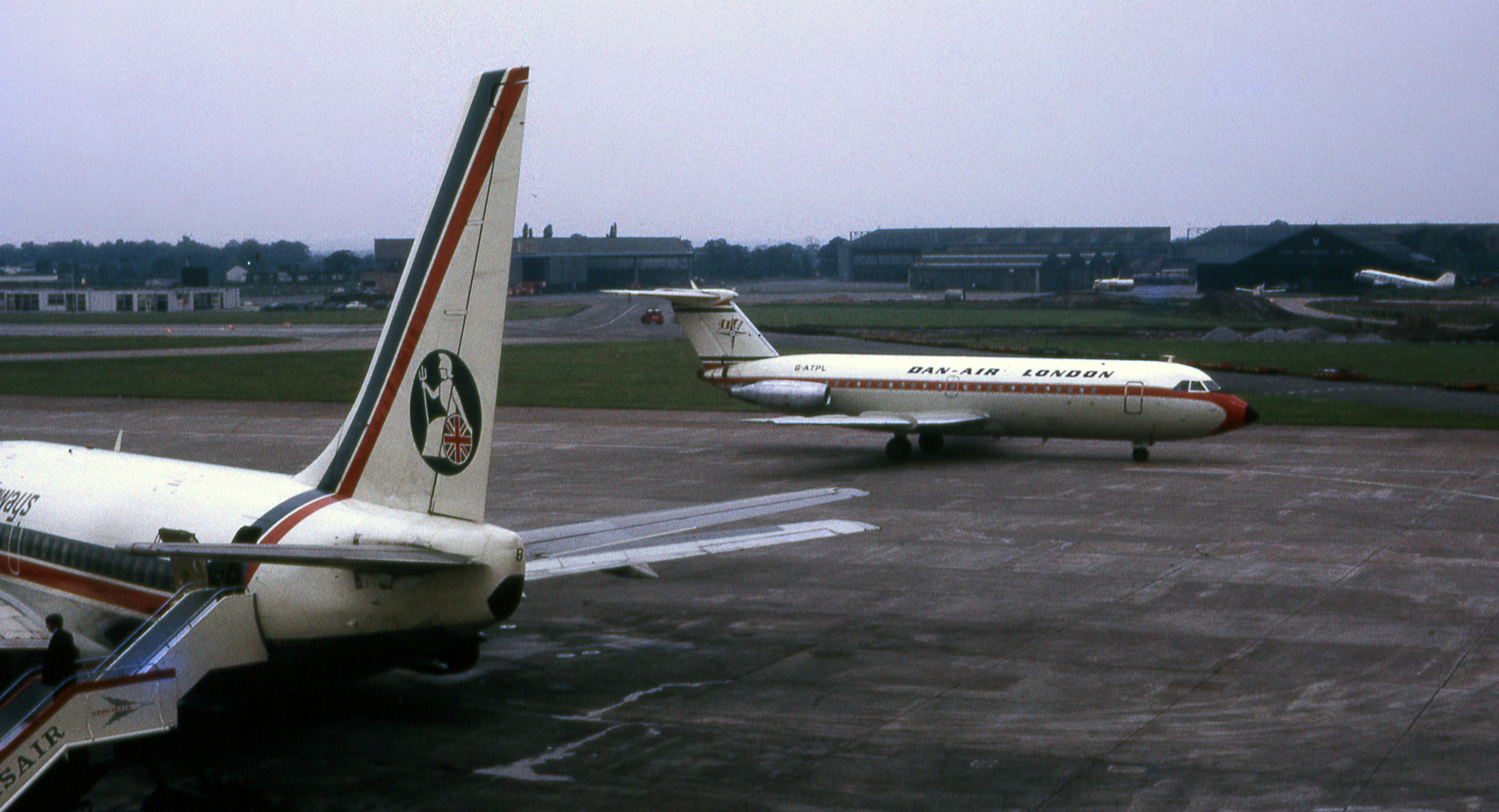
One of two BAC One-Eleven 300s sister airline Dan-Air acquired in 1969 following British Eagle's bankruptcy, seen here passing behind a Britannia Airways Boeing 737-200 at Manchester Airport in 1972.

Dan-Air's acquisition of its first two BAC One-Elevens from American Airlines in 1969 necessitated a major modification programme at Lasham before these aircraft could join the UK civil aircraft register as these were 400 series models that had been built to comply with US airworthiness requirements, which differed in several important aspects from the UK's airworthiness requirements.

The introduction of Dan-Air's first American-built jet aircraft, an ex-Pan Am Boeing 707 320 series "Intercontinental", in 1971 eventually led to Dan-Air Engineering being granted "FAA Repair Station" status. This meant that it could perform maintenance, repair and overhaul (MRO) tasks on aircraft that were on the US civil aircraft register and/or were governed by US airworthiness standards.

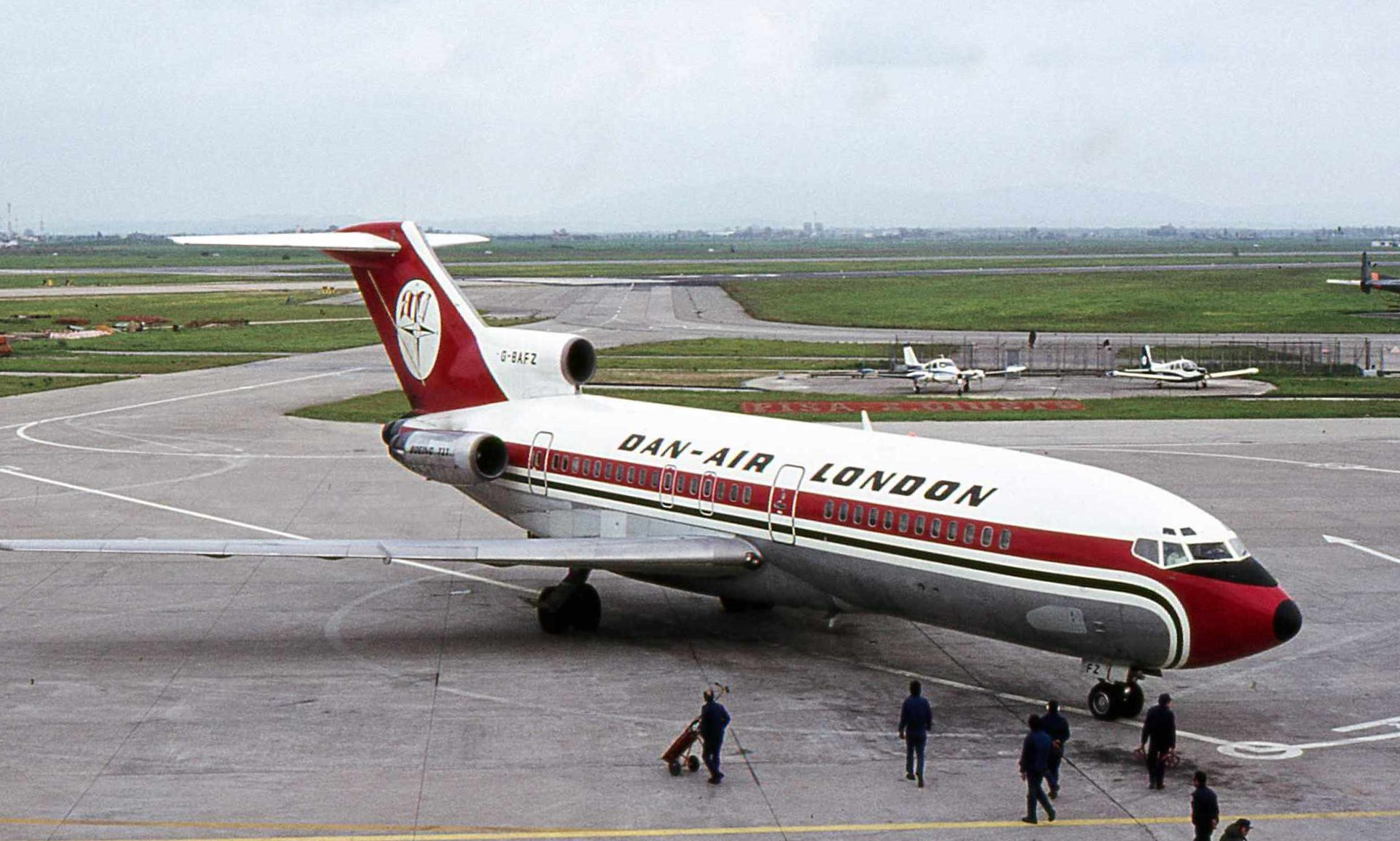
One of three Boeing 727-100s sister airline Dan-Air acquired from Japan Airlines in 1972, seen here in 1974 (note the additional emergency door at the rear of the fuselage).

Dan-Air's decision to become the first British operator of the Boeing 727 resulted in the purchase of three 100 series examples from Japan Airlines (JAL) in 1972. As these aircraft lacked high frequency (HF) radios, they needed to be flown across the Pacific with two intermediate 24-hour stops at Wake Island and Honolulu (where the aircraft refuelled and waited for the overflight of the next scheduled Tokyo – Los Angeles Boeing 747 service to provide navigational assistance for the next stage of the onward journey until Los Angeles was reached). (Note: JAL crews ferried each aircraft from Tokyo via Wake Island, Honolulu and Los Angeles to Seattle Boeing Field) After reaching the US, they underwent an extensive modification programme at Boeing's Wichita plant in Kansas to comply with British Civil Airworthiness Requirements (BCAR). These modifications entailed the installation of two additional emergency doors each side of the rear fuselage and a full stall-protection system, including a stick pusher. Following their arrival in the UK at Dan-Air Engineering's Lasham base, (Note: via Gatwick) each aircraft was fitted with new galleys manufactured by Dan-Air Engineering together with 150 seats. The aircraft were also repainted at Lasham prior to their entry into service with Dan-Air in 1973.

By the mid-1970s, Dan-Air Engineering's workforce had expanded to more than 800, the vast majority of whom were based at Lasham.

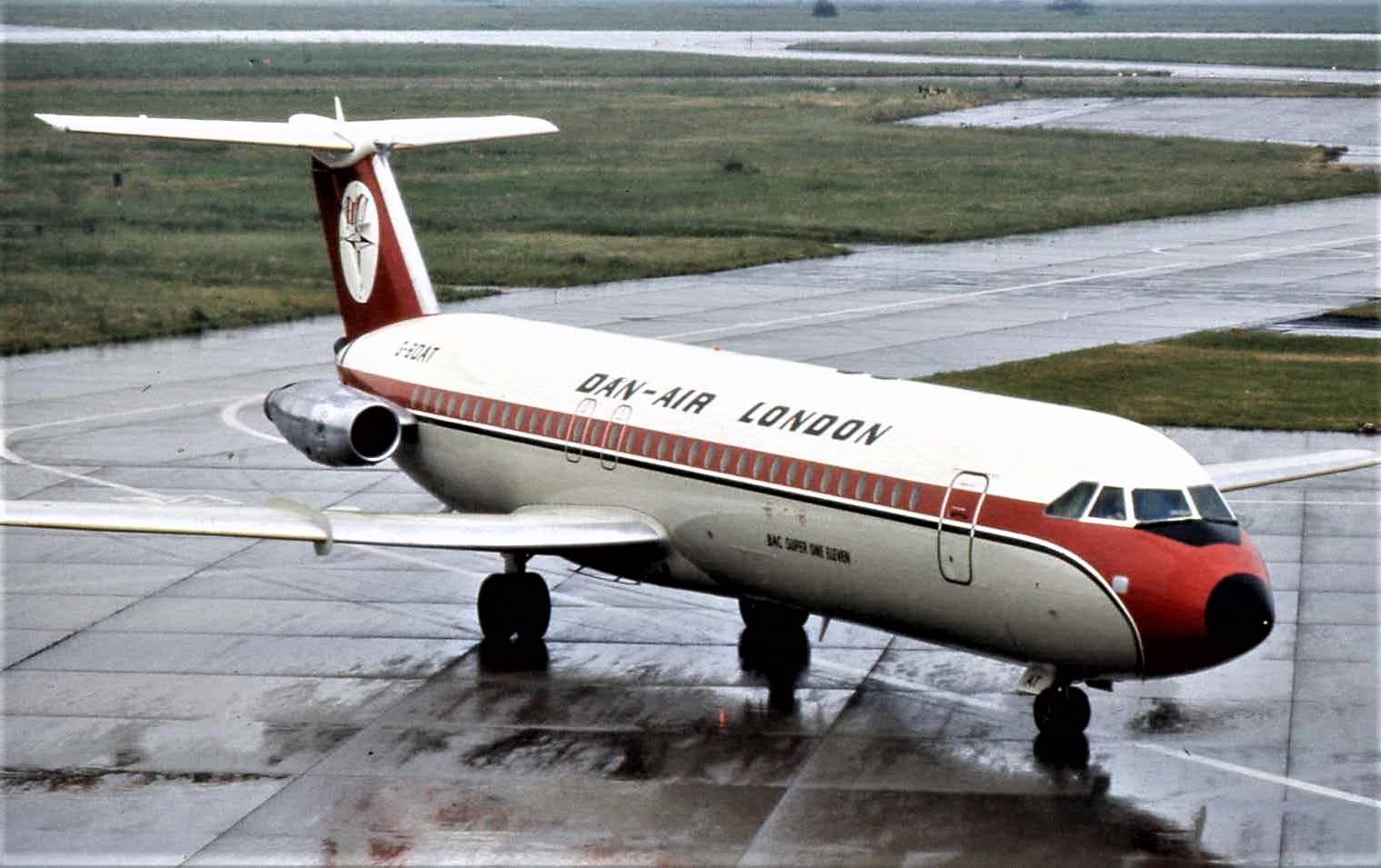
One of four BAC One-Eleven 500s sister airline Dan-Air acquired in 1974 following Court Line's bankruptcy, seen here at Pisa Airport in 1975.

The continuing, rapid expansion of the Dan-Air fleet during the 1970s as well as growing third-party work during that period resulted in the opening of Dan-Air Engineering's second maintenance base at Manchester Airport in 1976. The new Manchester base took over Lasham's maintenance of Dan-Air's One-Eleven and Hawker Siddeley 748 fleets. It also developed third-party de Havilland Canada Dash 7 and McDonnell Douglas MD-80 maintenance capabilities, as a result of which Lasham began to specialise in the maintenance of all Boeing narrow-bodied aircraft types.

Eventually, Dan-Air Engineering became the second biggest employer at Manchester Airport (after the airport authority).

Dan-Air had its entire 17-strong One-Eleven fleet hush-kitted at Dan-Air Engineering's Manchester base by the end of 1985.

By the late-1980s, Dan-Air Engineering's total workforce had almost doubled to 1,500. (This was in addition to Dan-Air's 3,000-strong workforce at the time, resulting in a total employee strength of 4,500 for the entire Davies and Newman group during that period.)

=== Further expansion in the late 1980s ===
On 28 February 1989 Dan-Air Engineering opened its third base at London Gatwick, its sister airline Dan-Air's main operating base since 1960. At that time Dan-Air Engineering maintained over 100 aircraft, including Dan-Air's 50-strong fleet. The new Gatwick maintenance base featured Dan-Air Engineering's first and only widebody-capable hangar (located at the airport's northwest side). Princess Alexandra conducted the official opening ceremony for Dan-Air Engineering's new hangar at Gatwick Airport on 18 April 1989. The Gatwick hangar could handle all Western-built widebodied aircraft — including the Boeing 747, then the world's largest widebodied airliner in commercial airline service.

Davies and Newman's decision to establish a new, widebody-capable maintenance facility operated by maintenance subsidiary Dan-Air Engineering at airline subsidiary Dan-Air's Gatwick base was taken in response to the following events:

- Gatwick had experienced rapid growth since the late-1970s, with an increasing number of movements at the airport accounted for by widebodied aircraft, including those operated by US carriers on transatlantic scheduled services.
- The collapse of Laker Airways, Gatwick's largest resident operator of widebodied equipment since the early-70s, during the early part of the 1980s had led to the concentration of all widebody-capable hangarage and associated maintenance capabilities in the hands of British Caledonian. British Caledonian was the airport's largest resident operator and its leading scheduled airline, which also happened to be the main transatlantic competitor of most of the Gatwick-based US carriers. The result was a shortage of independently owned/operated, widebody-capable maintenance facilities at Gatwick. (The unease of these US carriers at having to rely on widebody-capable maintenance facilities controlled by their main transatlantic competitor for their Gatwick operations grew when British Airways, a far bigger as well as operationally and financially stronger airline than British Caledonian, inherited these facilities as a result of its takeover of that airline during the latter part of the 1980s.)

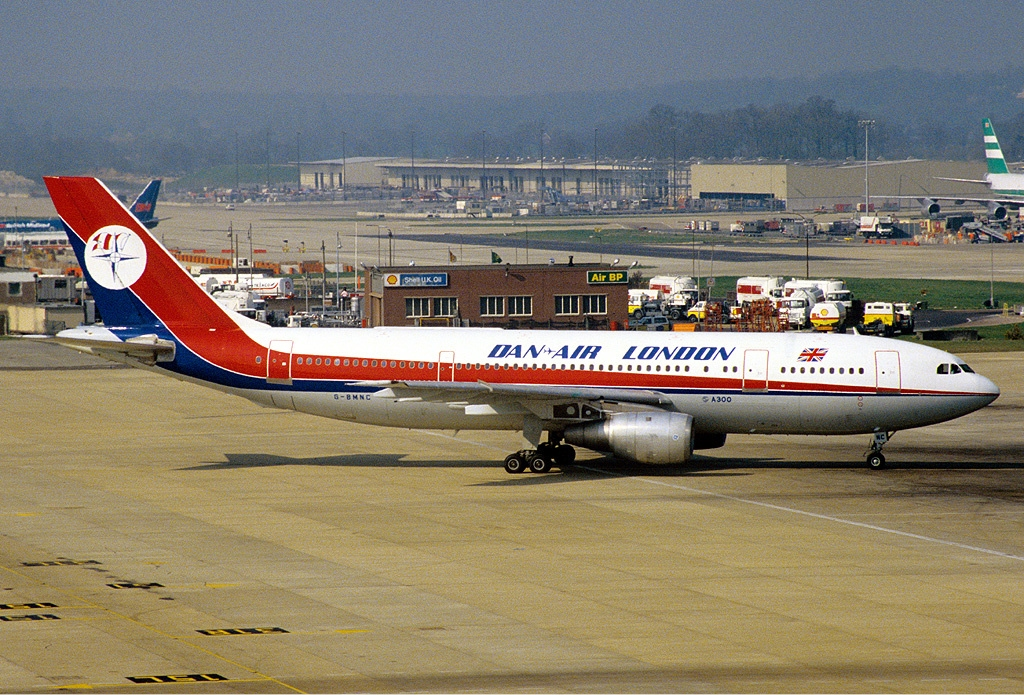
One of three Airbus A300 B4 series sister airline Dan-Air acquired from Hapag-Lloyd in 1986 and 1988 respectively. G-BMNC (ex-D-AMAX), the aircraft seen here taxiing towards its stand at London Gatwick in March 1990, entered service with Dan-Air in August 1988.

- Since the beginning of the 1980s Dan-Air itself had been looking at introducing aircraft that were more advanced and had a greater seating capacity than the Boeing 727-200 Advanced, the largest contemporary aircraft in the airline's fleet, to combat rising jet fuel prices and to make the best use of Gatwick's increasingly scarce early morning peak time slots. This led to the evaluation of the Boeing 757 and several other state-of-the-art, high-capacity narrow- and widebodied aircraft types. That evaluation process resulted in the introduction of a 336-seat ex-Hapag-Lloyd Airbus A300 B4 series widebodied aircraft into Dan-Air's fleet in 1986. This in turn necessitated putting in place the maintenance infrastructure to support the operation of the airline's first widebodied type at Gatwick.
- Gatwick's increasingly tight slot situation from the second half of the 1980s made frequent ferry flights to/from Lasham and Manchester to maintain Dan-Air's large, Gatwick-based narrow-bodied fleet less and less feasible as each movement accounted for by a non-revenue flight represented a lost commercial opportunity.

The opening of Dan-Air Engineering's third maintenance base resulted in an increase in the engineering unit's total staffing level to over 1,600.

=== Change of ownership ===
Dan-Air Engineering's sister airline Dan-Air's growing financial problems from the second half of 1990 against the backdrop of a severe recession in the UK and a looming war in the Gulf led to a change in both organisations' parent company Davies and Newman's top management. This in turn resulted in a change in the airline's strategic direction with profound implications for the engineering unit's future.

The new management's decision to focus Dan-Air's future activities on the provision of fully fledged scheduled services on high-profile domestic and international European trunk routes from the airline's Gatwick base with a fleet of brand-new Boeing 737 300/400 series and BAe 146 300 series/Avro RJ115 jets meant that Dan-Air Engineering's capacity exceeded its sister airline's maintenance requirements by 45%.

At the same time, Dan-Air Engineering was facing growing competition in the global third-party MRO market from rival specialist providers with far greater economies of scale, considerably lower labour costs and much more powerful parent organisations in places such as China, the Middle East and the Republic of Ireland.

As a result, Davies and Newman was no longer in a position to fund the competing investment requirements of both its airline and engineering subsidiaries from its own, limited financial resources. It therefore decided to focus all its resources on Dan-Air and to sell off Dan-Air Engineering to a major, specialist MRO provider with the expertise and resources to continue investing in it.

In the event, Davies and Newman sold Dan-Air Engineering to FLS Aerospace, a major specialist MRO provider in the UK and Ireland with bases at Stansted, Manchester and Dublin, for £27.5 million on 28 February 1991. The sale of Dan-Air Engineering to FLS Aerospace resulted in a reduction in employment at the remaining Davies and Newman group companies from 4,000 to 2,500, almost all of whom continued to be employed at Dan-Air.

Following Dan-Air Engineering's sale, Dan-Air awarded FLS Aerospace the contract for the maintenance of its fleet.

(FLS Aerospace's loss of the Dan-Air maintenance contract as a result of the airline's takeover by British Airways in 1992 led to the decommissioning and mothballing of the hangars it had acquired from Dan-Air Engineering at Gatwick and Lasham. The Gatwick hangar was subsequently brought back into service in the late-1990s following British Airways's decision to make the airport a major hub. It was decommissioned once more as a consequence of British Airways's subsequent decision to de-hub Gatwick, following the adoption of a new corporate strategy aimed at restructuring the airline's loss-making operation at the airport in the aftermath of recording its first-ever full-year loss since privatisation in 2000. Most recently, on 1 August 2006, Virgin Atlantic took over this hangar to provide an in-house maintenance capability for its growing Boeing 747-400 fleet at Gatwick as well as to support sister airline Virgin Nigeria's daily Airbus A340 operation from/to Lagos at the airport.

Meanwhile, FLS Aerospace itself was acquired by SR Technics, the former maintenance arm of defunct Swissair, in 2004. Towards the end of 2006, SR Technics in turn was jointly taken over by the governments of Abu Dhabi and Dubai (through Mubadala and Dubai Aerospace Enterprise, respectively), who then incorporated it into their nascent MRO venture.

The former Dan-Air Engineering maintenance base at Lasham was acquired by ATC Lasham, a Boeing MRO specialist, in 1995.

== Facts of interest ==
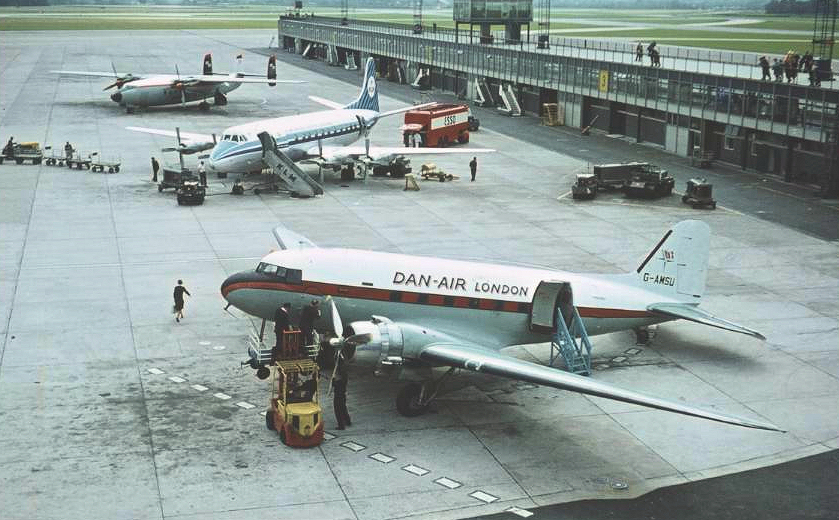
Sister airline Dan-Air's first aircraft, Douglas C-47 B Dakota 4 G-AMSU, seen here at Manchester Airport in 1964 (note the Dan-Air Airspeed Ambassador behind the KLM Viscount in the background).

- Dan-Air Engineering restored one of the Douglas Dakotas operated by sister airline Dan-Air as the airline's first aircraft, applying the contemporary livery and aircraft registration (G-AMSU). (The aircraft, which was originally registered G-AMPP when in commercial airline service with Dan-Air, was on display at Lasham from 1971 until 1991.)
- During the 1970s Dan-Air Engineering developed a comprehensive non-destructive testing (NDT) capability. (This assumed added significance following the loss of one of sister airline Dan-Air's Boeing 707 freighters during the second half of that decade due to metal fatigue, leading to the separation of the aircraft's horizontal stabiliser in mid-air.)
- During the early-1980s Dan-Air Engineering's Manchester base designed and installed a then unique cargo door in one of sister airline Dan-Air's Hawker Siddeley 748 turboprops that had specifically been acquired for this purpose. This enabled the aircraft – a series 2 HS 748 (registration G-BIUV) fitted with an 8 ft (2.4 m) by 8 ft (2.4 m) rear cargo door – to carry "outsize" cargoes, such as pipes and oil drilling equipment measuring up to 6 in (15 cm) in diameter and up to 40 ft (12 m) in length, which made it particularly suitable for oil industry support work.
- During the 1980s Dan-Air Engineering held the contract to maintain the Qatar Amiri Flight's Boeing 727-200 Advanced VIP aircraft fleet. (The flight deck crew flying these aircraft were seconded from sister airline Dan-Air.)

== Notes and citations ==
Notes

Citations
