= Jasper Blaxland =

English physician (1880–1963)

Jasper Blaxland FRCS
- Born: Athelstan Jasper Blaxland; 14 September 1880; London
- Died: 7 December 1963 (aged 83); Norwich, Norfolk
- Education: University College Hospital
- Years active: 1907–1946
- Medical career
- Profession: Physician
- Institutions: University College Hospital; Great Ormond Street Hospital; Royal National Hospital; Norfolk and Norwich Hospital
- Sub-specialties: consultant general surgeon

Athelstan Jasper Blaxland FRCS (14 September 1880 – 7 December 1963) was an English physician. He began his career as a general practitioner in Norwich and later become a consultant general surgeon at the Norfolk and Norwich Hospital.

== Early life and education ==
Blaxland was born on 14 September 1880, the only son of William Athelstan Blaxland, solicitor to London County Council, and Frances Elizabeth Shears, a great-granddaughter of the coppersmith James Shears. He was educated at Westminster School from 1893 to 1898 then studied at University College Hospital, where he was awarded Bachelor of Medicine and Bachelor of Surgery (MB, BS) degrees in 1904 and a Master of Surgery (MS) degree in 1908.

He became a Licentiate of the Royal College of Physicians (LRCP) and Member of the Royal Colleges of Surgeons (MRCP) in 1904 and a Fellow of the Royal Colleges of Surgeons (FRCS) in 1908.

== Career ==
After graduation, Blaxland's house appointments were at University College Hospital under Dr. Sidney Martin, Great Ormond Street Hospital under Dr. Archibald Garrod, the Royal National Hospital and, for 18 months, at the Norfolk and Norwich Hospital. He then joined Dr. Donald Day, who was married to his aunt Henrietta Sarah Blaxland, in general practice in Norwich.

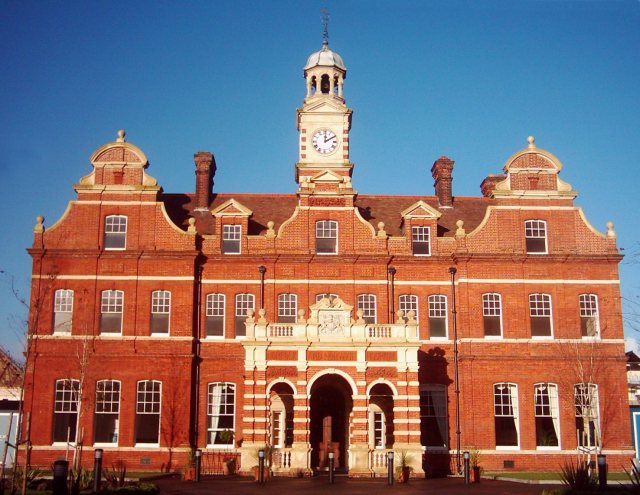
The Norfolk and Norwich Hospital

In 1909 Blaxland became an assistant surgeon at the Norfolk and Norwich Hospital, but continued to work as a general practitioner. In 1911 he moved to a Georgian property at 29, Surrey Street in Norwich, where he ran his general practice.

Following the outbreak of the First World War, Blaxland was commissioned into the Royal Army Medical Corps as a temporary Captain in March 1915, serving mostly in France as a casualty clearing station surgeon, treating battle casualties. He was promoted to the rank of Major in 1918. After returning to Norwich in 1919, he gave up general practice, building up a practice as a consulting surgeon.

In 1925 he was appointed as a full surgeon to the Norfolk and Norwich Hospital, where in 1927 Dr. Geoffrey Gillam became his house surgeon. He was honorary secretary of the Norfolk branch of the British Medical Association from 1922 to 1928 and served as its president in 1930−1931; he was also vice-president of the Medical Defence Union.

He described a method, known as the Blaxland sign or Blaxland ruler test, for distinguishing between ovarian cyst and ascites by using a ruler to test for pulsation.

Blaxland was preparing to retire when the Second World War began. He continued his work at the hospital until 1946, keeping the casualty department prepared for emergencies during difficult wartime conditions. Upon retirement, his portrait was painted by Faith K. Sage and is now in the Norfolk and Norwich University Hospital collection.

== Personal life ==
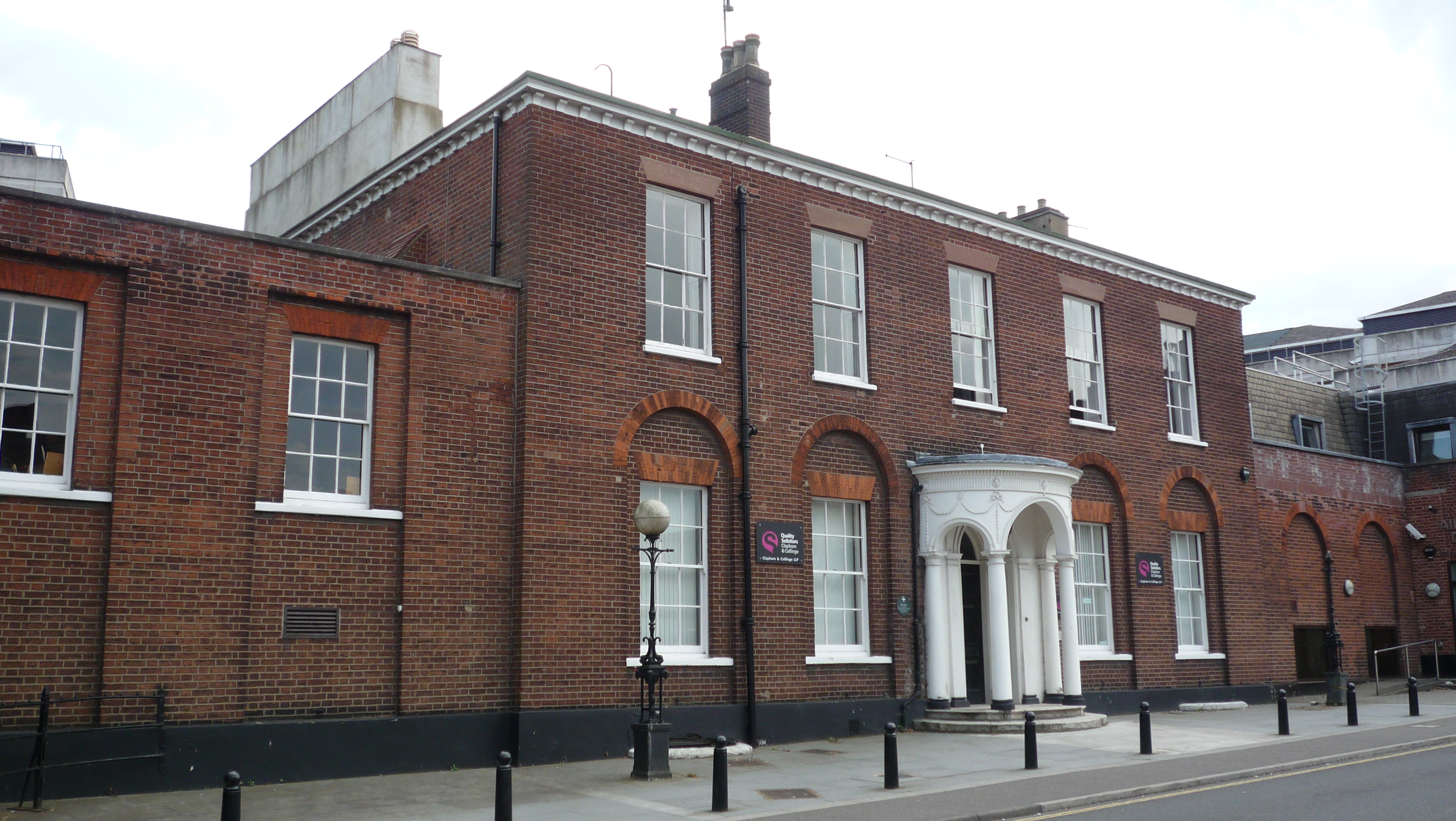
St Catherine's Close, Norwich

In 1912, at Henstead in Suffolk, Blaxland married Anna Marion, daughter of William Andrews of Chediston. They had four sons: Mark; John Christopher; William Gregory, a military historian; and Stephen, who followed his father into the medical profession.

In 1928 the Blaxlands moved to a property called St Catherine's Close on All Saints Green in Norwich. They later moved to 33, The Close (in the cathedral precincts), where in retirement Blaxland took up a new interest − painting. He also played tennis and golf and enjoyed shooting.

Blaxland died on 7 December 1963, a few months after his wife; his funeral was held at Norwich Cathedral. An obituary called him "unorthodox... altogether a whimsical but lovable character."

His cousin Dr. Mary Thackwell (née Day) was one of the first women doctors at the Norfolk and Norwich Hospital.

== Publications ==
Blaxland was the author or co-author of:

- "A case of congenital hypertrophic stenosis of the pylorus: treatment by gastric lavage with complete recovery" (The Lancet, 1905)
- "Remarks on acute pancreatitis: with notes of seven cases" (British Medical Journal, 1913)
