= Pixley (surname) =

Pixley is a surname, and may refer to:

- Andrew Pixley (1943–1965), American convicted murderer
- Annie Pixley (c.1848–1893), American stage actress
- Charles C. Pixley (1923–2005), Surgeon General of the United States Army
- Francis W. Pixley (c.1852–1933), English accountant, barrister and author
- Frank M. Pixley (1825–1895), American journalist, attorney and politician
- Frank S. Pixley (c.1867–1919), American educator, newspaper editor, playwright and lyricist
- George V. Pixley (1937–2023), American Christian theologian
- Gus Pixley (1873–1923), American actor, singer and comic
- Lloyd Pixley (c.1900−1954), American football player
- Ray Pixley (1907–1936), American racing driver
