= Joseph Davies (British politician) =

British politician (1866–1954)

Sir Joseph Davies in 1919

Sir Joseph Davies KBE (11 December 1866 – 3 December 1954) was a Welsh businessman, commercial statistician and Liberal Party politician. He was one of a talented group of men and women who worked closely with David Lloyd George during his premiership as a key member of Lloyd George's wartime secretariat, known as the Garden Suburb.

== Early life ==
Born in Newport, Monmouthshire, Davies was the youngest of the three sons of Thomas Seth Davies, master mariner, and his wife Julia. His father was originally from St Issells, near Saundersfoot in Pembrokeshire, his mother from Devonport, Plymouth. In 1871, the family was living in Fremantle Square, Cotham, and Davies and his brother William were at school. He was later educated at Bristol Grammar School.

In June 1885, when Davies was eighteen, his father died at sea.

== Career ==
Davies began working life as a clerk in Cardiff Docks. He had a flair for statistics and organisation, and in partnership with C. P. Hailey he built up a considerable business, including the formation of investment trusts. He also became Secretary of the Coal and Shipping Exchange in Cardiff. Over many years, Davies successfully built up his business interests based around the traditional industries of South Wales, coal and railways. He was sometime Director of the Cambrian Railways and Chairman of the Totton and Fawley Light Railway Company. He later became Chairman of the Agwi Petroleum Corporation, which was later absorbed into Esso. He diversified into property and was a Director of the Anglo-Scottish Amalgamated Trust, Chairman of the Status Investment Trust Ltd and a director of other companies. Davies also carried out charitable work, and Lloyd George was impressed by his success as chairman of the committee set up to distribute the money sent by Welshmen in the United States for the relief of suffering in Wales. Lloyd George invited Davies to join his secretariat in Downing Street, known as the Garden Suburb. The group around the prime minister at this time included Frances Stevenson, Waldorf Astor, Philip Kerr, Cecil Harmsworth, and Edward Grigg. Davies acted as Secretary to the prime minister's secretariat from 1917 to 1920.

== Political career ==
In 1913, Davies was adopted as Liberal candidate for Crewe. However, in December 1916 a by-election was caused in the Liberal seat at Derby when Sir Thomas Roe resigned in anticipation of being sent to the House of Lords. Derby Liberals favoured Davies for their candidate, but Liberal Party headquarters in London was still under the control of H. H. Asquith, even though he had ceased to be prime minister, and they issued an edict that, because of his close association with Lloyd George, Davies was not to be selected under any circumstances. Asquith's personal secretary went to Derby to enforce this instruction. Although a majority of Derby's Liberal delegates wanted Davies, they chose an Asquithian Liberal, William Job Collins, instead. When the 1918 general election was called, Davies was adopted for Crewe. He secured the Coalition coupon and the sitting Unionist Member, Ernest Craig, stood aside. His Labour opponent was J. T. Brownlie, President of the Amalgamated Society of Engineers. Although Davies won the election with a majority of 2,953 votes, the largest recorded in the constituency since its creation in 1885, the Labour vote rose dramatically to 10,439, up from the 2,485 achieved at the previous election, a by-election in 1912. When Davies defended Crewe at the 1922 general election, standing as a Lloyd George National Liberal, he again faced no Conservative opponent. It was reported that the National Liberals in Cheshire had come to an agreement with the Tories that if they declined to stand a candidate against Davies in Crewe, there would be no National Liberal opposition to Conservative candidates in the divisions of Eddisbury, Chester, and Northwich, and the National Liberals would urge their supporters to support the Conservative candidates in those seats. The Lloyd George Liberals held to their side of the bargain, as there were no National Liberal candidates in any Cheshire seat at the 1922 general election except for Davies in Crewe. There were a number of Independent Liberals, including one in Chester, but this did not stop the Tories from making a clean sweep of every Cheshire seat they contested in the election. The pact was not enough to save Davies, however, as he was this time defeated by Labour's Edward Hemmerde, a former Liberal. One historian has commented that politics in Crewe had been changed by a number of factors, including deaths among pre-war Liberal stalwarts, the decline of nonconformity, the decreasing importance of temperance agitation, and the rise of trade unionism. The progressive torch in Crewe passed from Liberalism to Labour.

== Later life and death ==
Davies devoted himself to his business affairs after leaving Parliament. He was also a good lawn tennis player, playing in tournaments. He served as the first president of Dinas Powis Golf Club and drove the first ball when the club formally opened on 2 May 1914.

In 1894, Davies had married Blanche, a daughter of John Heron Wilson, of Cardiff; they do not appear to have had any children. In 1939, they were living in retirement in Bristol Road, Weston super Mare. Lady Davies died in 1951, and in his final years Davies was living at Dinas Powis, Glamorganshire. He died at St Winifred’s Hospital, Cardiff, on 3 December 1954, and left an estate valued at £10,779. Probate was granted to his nephew John Wingett Davies.

== Appointments and honours ==
Davies was knighted in January 1918 in recognition of his work for the government during the First World War, becoming a knight commander of the recently created Order of the British Empire. He also served as a Justice of the Peace. From 1914 to 1917 he was the representative for Wales and Monmouthshire on the Cabinet Committee for Prevention of Unemployment. He was a member of the Royal Commission on Daylight Saving and was a member of a War Cabinet Delegation to the United States in 1917. He later served as a member of a Parliamentary Inquiry into the government's scheme for the establishment of a motor repair works at Cippenham, near Slough.

== Papers ==
A collection of Davies’s papers has been deposited at the National Library of Wales, along with those of some other Liberal politicians who were early contemporaries of Lloyd George at Westminster. In addition, some notes by Davies on his visits to Newcastle, Sunderland, Glasgow, and South Wales in relation to the Labour question are part of the Lloyd George papers in the Parliamentary Archives.

== Publications ==
- Railway rates, charges, and regulations of the United Kingdom : being a summary of the railway rates and charges (order confirmation) acts, 1891 and 1892, and of the acts passed from 1854 to 1888 for the general regulation of railways McCorquodale, [1892?]
- The North Country Coal and Shipping Annual for 1912 – edited with Graham Wallis
- South Wales Coalfield: map showing the mineral undertakings of steam properties, the position of the pits, the railways serving the district and ports of shipment – Offices of the South Wales Coal Annual, 12 James Street, Cardiff – c1910
- The Prime Minister’s Secretariat, 1916–1920: Memoirs of a member of the secretariat under David Lloyd George – R H Johns, Newport, Mon 1951

Parliament of the United Kingdom
Preceded by Ernest Craig	Member of Parliament for Crewe; 1918–1922	Succeeded by Edward George Hemmerde
