= Davies and Newman =

British shipping company

Davies and Newman Limited was a privately held British shipping company, formed in 1922, a member of the Baltic Exchange, from which several other companies developed, including Dan-Air, Dan-Air Engineering, Dan-Air Flying Services, Dan-Air Intercontinental, and Davies and Newman Travel. The company also owned Gatwick Handling, jointly with Laker Airways.

In 1971, the company was floated on the London Stock Exchange, when its ownership was transferred into a new public limited company called Davies and Newman Holdings Limited.

== Early history ==
The Company was incorporated in 1922 by two partners, Captain William Davies and Frank Newman, to carry on business as shipbrokers, oilbrokers, and tanker managers, taking over the interests of a company established in the 1880s called Lane and MacAndrew, of which Newman had been a director, which was wound up. In 1962, it was suggested that Lane and MacAndrew had become Davies and Newman.

Captain William Davies had first gone to sea in 1875, shipping as a boy in a Welsh barque. He obtained his Master's Certificate in 1885 and his Extra Master's Certificate in 1887, bringing with it the title of master mariner. During the First World War he managed tankers for the Admiralty. By the time of his death in 1936, he had been in the bulk oil trade for almost fifty years and was a member of the committee of the Tanker Pool. Davies died in March 1936, aged 73.

Frank Newman began his career with Lane and MacAndrew in the 1890s and was regarded as one of the first tanker brokers. He died on 26 February 1953, aged eighty, at his home in Woking. Davies and Newman Limited then had its main offices at St Swithin's House, 11 & 12 St Swithin's Lane, in the City of London.

Frederick Newman, born in Leytonstone in 1916, was the son of Frank Newman. After attending The Leys School, he joined Davies and Newman, then during World War II saw active service in Burma with the Honourable Artillery Company, rising to the rank of Captain and being awarded the Military Cross. In May 1953, the younger Newman founded Dan-Air as an offshoot of the shipping business and went on to serve as its chairman from 1953 until 1990. At its peak, Dan-Air employed 4,500 people and flew more than six million passengers a year.

In 1961, the company, by then headquartered at 36/38, New Broad Street, London EC2, announced that it was forming a new department to charter tonnage for dry cargo business and that L. H. R. Rigg, a chartered surveyor, had been appointed as its manager.

By 1971, the original company was still active in shipping and aviation, the shipping activities conducted directly by the Company, the aviation activities through Dan-Air Services Limited, trading as Dan-Air, and had several other subsidiaries. In that year, Frederick Newman, as Chairman, supported by John Wingett Davies (1908–1991), Deputy Chairman, the son of the other founding partner, Captain Davies, announced that the company was to be floated on the London Stock Exchange, with its ownership to be transferred into a new public company called Davies and Newman Holdings Limited. Having quoted shares would bring financial openness, greater respect, and an injection of new capital, with the result that services were expanded.

== Position in 1971 ==
Hambros Bank floated the new Davies and Newman Holdings Limited by an initial public offering in October 1971, when the offer was of 1,133,000 ordinary shares of 25p each in the new company, priced at 130 pence per share, payable in full on application. The position of the existing Davies and Newman company in 1971 was outlined by the Chairman as follows:

Shipping

Shipping activities, managed directly by Davies and Newman, were largely based on the company's long-standing connections with major oil companies and with Norwegian and other shipowners. The shipping activities were conducted through:

- The Tanker Chartering Department, accounting for some 80 per cent of the turnover on shipping activities, had close working links with major British oil companies and with connections in Scandinavia, New York, Paris, Tokyo, Lisbon, Greece, Italy, and other parts of the world. The business negotiated ranged from single voyage charters, on which the Company received a single commission, to long-term charters and consecutive-voyage charters, lasting between one and twenty years, with commission paid in instalments over the period. Twenty-year time charters for two tankers, each of about 470,000 tons, had recently been arranged.
- General Chartering Department: as a member of the Baltic Exchange, the company had recently formed this Department to deal wilh the chartering of dry cargo vessels and bulk-carriers.
- Sale and Purchase Department: the Company acted as agents for the placing of shipbuilding contracts and for buying and selling second-hand ships, dealing with all types of vessels, from trawlers to ocean liners, negotiating their sale or purchase, either for trading purposes or for breaking-up.
- Ships Agency Department: acting on behalf of Shell, Texaco, and other owners, handling tankers calling in the River Thames, at Thameshaven and Canvey Island, with more than 500 vessels handled each year.

Aviation

Aviation Activities began in the early 1950s as an Air Broking Department within Davies and Newman, and in 1953 Dan-Air was formed as a wholly owned subsidiary, to deal with all such business.

- The package holiday business was most of the aviation activity, under contracts varying in length from one to five years, with Clarksons, Lunn Poly, Global, and other tour operators. Dan-Air's share of the British airlines' package holiday business was estimated to be about 14 per cent in 1970, and it was about 80 per cent of the company's aviation turnover. Spain was the main package holiday destination, with flights also to Italy, Greece, Yugoslavia, Germany, Switzerland, and other countries.

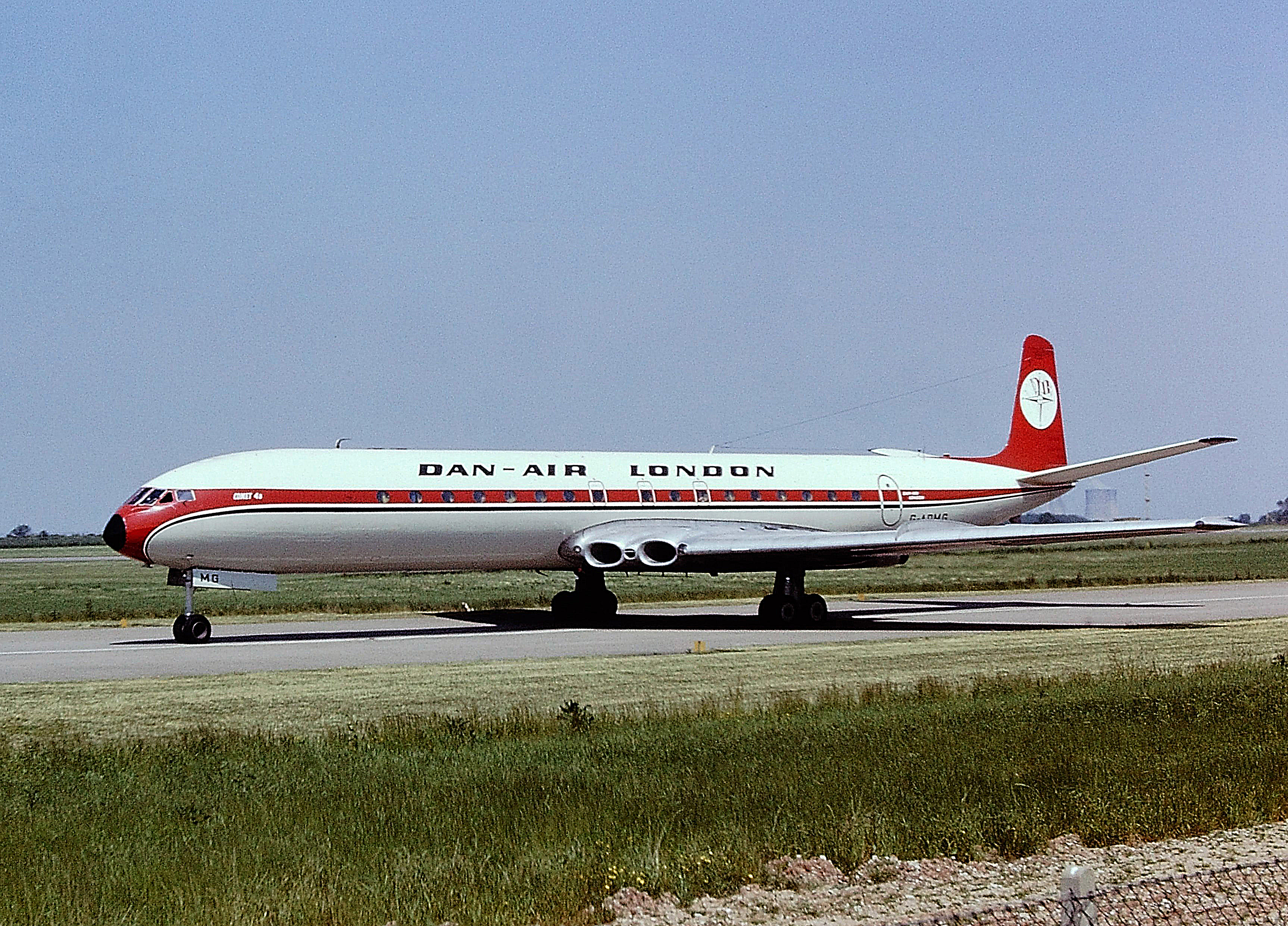
A Dan-Air Comet 4

- Scheduled services included the “Link City” service between Bristol, Cardiff, Liverpool, Manchester, and Newcastle, and since June 1971 there was also a service between Leeds and Glasgow; the overseas scheduled services were between Liverpool and Amsterdam and between Newcastle and Southern Norway. In November 1970, Dan-Air had obtained a Civil Aeronautics Board permit, usually valid for five years, to operate charter flights to the United States, which had begun in February 1971.
- Dan-Air's present fleet included Comets, BAC One-Elevens, and a Boeing 707: a further BAC One-Eleven and a second Boeing 707 had been ordered for delivery in early 1972.
- In 1970 the total number of passenger flights was about 750,000 and this figure was expected to be higher in 1971.
- Dan-Air had its main operational base at Gatwick Airport, with subsidiary bases at Luton and Manchester, and also provided facilities for its own and other British and foreign airlines’ aircraft at Newcastle, Teesside, Liverpool, Bristol, and Cardiff.

Other subsidiaries

- Dan-Air Engineering was a wholly owned subsidiary mainly engaged in servicing and maintaining Dan-Air's aircraft at Lasham Airfield in Hampshire, but also undertaking outside contracts. Since 1955 this company had had approval by the Air Registration Board to carry out approved maintenance, and this approval now applied to all types of piston-engined aircraft and some types of jet. Mr. B. V. S. Williams, aged 53, was the Managing Director and had joined the Group in 1956.
- Davies and Newman Travel Limited, another wholly owned subsidiary, had a shop in the City of London selling inclusive tour holidays.
- The Group also had interests in airline support activities, including a car hire company at Gatwick, a bonded store at Gatwick (Dan-Air Bonded Store Limited, 50 percent) and flight kitchens at Bristol and Teesside.

Employees and premises

In October 1971 the Group had about eighty employees on the shipping side and about 1,200 on the aviation side, including about 220 pilots and flight engineers, about 200 air-hostesses, about 450 ground engineers, and about 300 other ground staff.

The Group had its head offices of some 11,400 square feet at Bilbao House, 36/38 New Broad Street, London, EC2M 1NH, and it also occupied other offices in London of some 8,200 square feet, plus others at Thameshaven, the base of the Ships Agency Department. Dan-Air Engineering Limited had a lease expiring in 1982 of some 19 acres at Lasham Airfield, with two hangars, plus various workshops, stores, and administrative offices. Dan-Air also had the use of the runway, suitable for jet aircraft. The Group owned a freehold house at Lowfield Heath, Sussex, and also occupied offices and workshops at Gatwick, Bristol, and Newcastle Airports, and offices at Cardiff, Liverpool, Manchester, Teesside, Luton, and Berlin Tegel Airports, and premises at Horsham, Sussex, used for training. All these premises, except for Lasham and the house at Lowfield Heath, were held on leases expiring by the end of 1975. The total of current rents payable was £89,554.

Directors

The directors of Davies and Newman in October 1971 were:

1. Frederick Edward Fry Newman M.C., Woking, Surrey, Chairman and Managing Director, aged 55, with the Company for his whole working life, apart from the war years
2. John Wingett Davies, Kensington, London W14, Deputy Chairman, aged 63, a director since 1937
3. Antony Harold Langworth, Wimbledon, London SW20, Executive Director in charge of tanker chartering, aged 58, with the Company since 1950
4. Edward James Mordaunt, Mereham, nr. Ashford, Kent, Executive Director, aged 48, with the Company since 1946
5. Bartholomew Martin O'Regan FCA, Beckenham, Kent, Finance Director and Secretary, aged 37, with the Company since 1967
6. Harry Neil Marten MP, Swancliffe House, nr. Banbury, Oxon, aged 54, a non-executive Director, associated with the Company since 1962
7. Alan John Alfred Snudden, Stanstead, Essex, Executive Director, and Managing Director of Dan-Air, aged 40, who had joined Dan-Air in 1956.

The company's bankers were Lloyds Bank Limited, 39 Threadneedle Street, London EC2.

== Later history ==
In 1972, Who Owns Whom recorded that Davies & Newman Holdings Limited owned Davies & Newman Limited, Davies & Newman Travel Limited, Dan-Air Services Limited, Dan-Air Engineering Limited, Dan-Air Flying Services Limited, Dan-Air Intercontinental Limited, and Gatwick Handling Limited. Gatwick Handling had just been acquired, and a half-share in it was soon sold to Laker Airways.

During the late 1980s the financial position of Dan-Air worsened, and in 1989 a new chairman, David James, was brought in. In 1991 Dan-Air lost £35 million, and then another £24 million in its last six months, between April and October 1992. In October 1992, after failed talks with Virgin Atlantic, Davies and Newman sold Dan-Air to British Airways for a nominal £1, with the new owner taking over debts of £37 million and other liabilities. In November 1992, the name was changed from Dan Air Services Ltd to British Airways (European Operations at Gatwick) Ltd.

John Wingett Davies was also chairman of British Cinematograph Theatres Ltd and in the 1977 New Year Honours was appointed OBE. He retired in 1984 and died in September 1991, leaving an estate valued at £614,274. Davies and Newman Holdings Limited was dissolved in 1996. Frederick Newman died on 19 October 2012, aged 96.

== See also ==
- Ol-class tanker (1918)
