= Arthur Buxton =

Rector of All Souls Church

The Reverend Arthur Buxton (7 August 1882 – 6 January 1958) was a clergyman of the Church of England, Rector of All Souls Church, Langham Place, Marylebone, after serving as Chaplain to the Forces during the First World War.

== Early life ==
Buxton was the third and youngest son of John Henry Buxton (1849–1934), of Easneye House, Ware, Hertfordshire, a grandson of Thomas Fowell Buxton (1822–1908), and a great-grandson of Sir Thomas Fowell Buxton, 1st Baronet. His uncles included Alfred Fowell Buxton, Chairman of London County Council, and Barclay Fowell Buxton, a missionary in Japan.

He was educated at Harrow and then at Trinity College, Cambridge, graduating BA in 1904 and being promoted to MA in 1908, and finally at Ridley Hall, Cambridge, which he joined in 1904 to train for the ministry. He was ordained deacon in 1907 and priest in 1908, both in the diocese of Southwark.

== Career ==
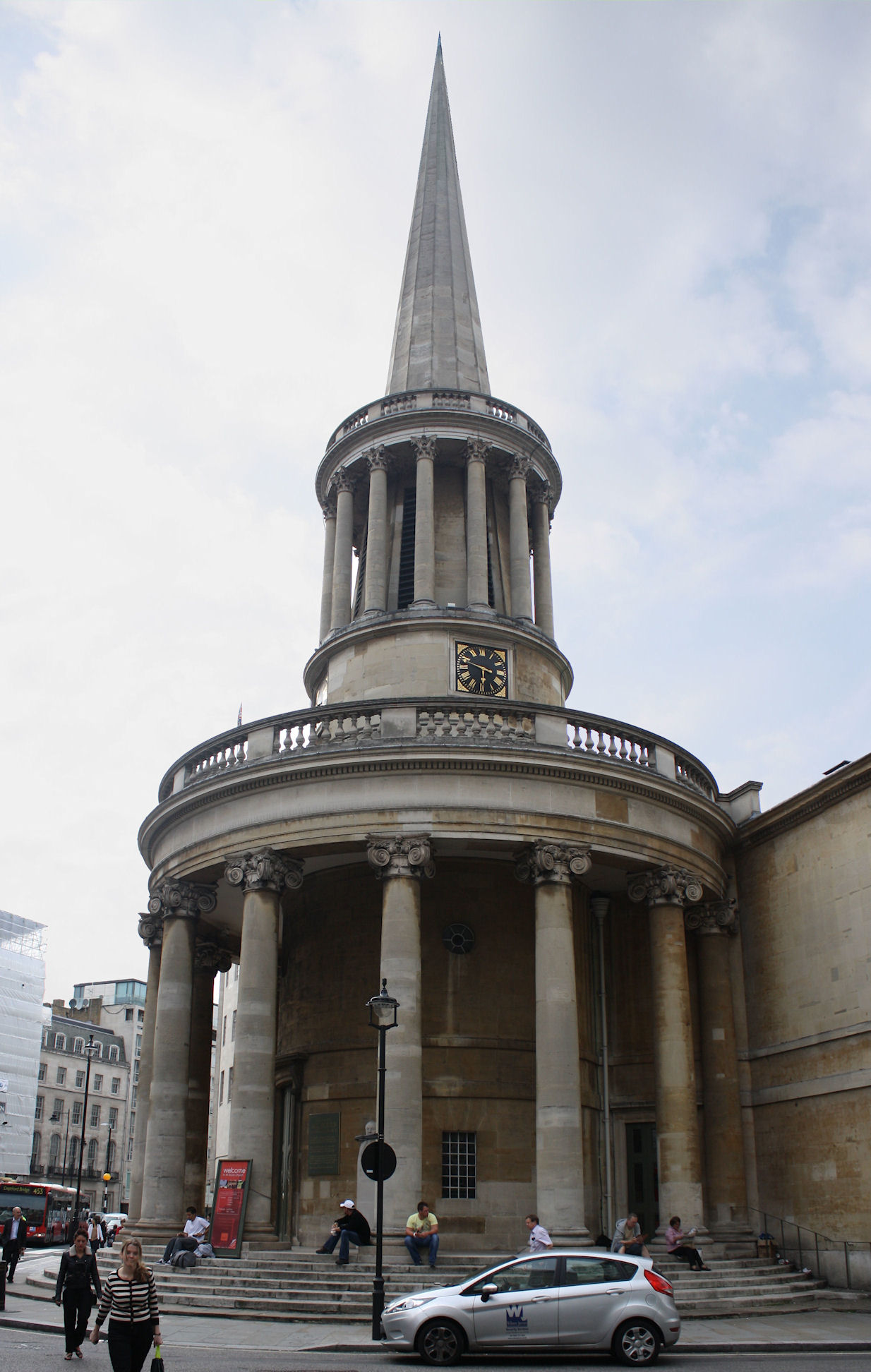
All Souls, Langham Place

Buxton's first appointment was as Curate of St Stephen's, Clapham Park, from 1907 to 1909. In 1910 he received his first benefice, becoming Vicar of the Church of the Martyrs, Leicester, where he remained three years, then from 1914 to 1919 was Vicar of All Saints, Southport. For part of that time he was Chaplain to the Forces in the latter part of the First World War and a little beyond it, serving from 1916 to 1919. He resigned his Southport living before leaving the service of the British Army.

In May 1920, Buxton was appointed as Rector of All Souls, Langham Place, Marylebone, taking up residence at All Souls Rectory, 12, Weymouth Street, Westminster. This was a very smart Church of England living, with the church standing at the north end of Regent Street, and at the time was worth £640 a year, equivalent to £32,471 in 2023, plus a fine house in an elegant part of the capital city. At the Easter Vestry meeting in 1921, Buxton forecast prosperous times ahead.

In March 1923, Buxton gave an interview to The Daily Express in which he said the coming of flats in fashionable neighbourhoods had caused a fall in church attendance.

At Langham Place, Buxton was identified with a new kind of churchman. Not only did he try to make his church attractive, up-to-date, and relevant to the times, but he also moved its theological style away from the firm Evangelicalism of his predecessors towards a less Protestant form of Anglicanism, referred to at the time as "Liberal Evangelicalism".

Under the heading "Can the Rector Fly?", in January 1933 the Kensington Post reported that Buxton was planning to attend a Conference in Cannes and would not be going by "ordinary common or garden mode of travel"; as an up-to-date clergyman he would instead travel by air.

In August 1933, Buxton appointed Dr John Ivimey, the director of music at Marlborough College, as organist and director of music at All Souls.

In January 1937, during the Spanish Civil War, Buxton visited his cousin Harold Buxton, who was then Bishop of Gibraltar, and during the last week of January they visited areas of Spain held by the Nationalists, led by Franco.

== Notable services ==
With All Souls, Langham Place, being the nearest church to Broadcasting House, headquarters of the BBC, the church was often used for broadcasting religious services. In January 1935, a "Children's Service", with an address by Buxton, was broadcast to the nation from All Souls, Langham Place, on the BBC Home Service. In February 1936, Buxton led a memorial service at All Souls for Dame Clara Butt.

On 21 September 1929, at All Souls, Buxton assisted the Rev. Wilfrid Oldaker in marrying Oldaker's cousin, a daughter of Captain William Davies, to Geoffrey Gillam.

== Private life ==
On 14 January 1908, Buxton married Esme Caroline, a daughter of Colonel Francis William Pixley DL, of Wooburn Green, Buckinghamshire. They had four children, Nigel Arthur (1909–1995), Richenda Dorothy (1911–1987), Mary Buxton (born 1913), and Priscilla Peronne (1916–1979).

In 1941, after giving up his London parish, Buxton retired to Upton House, Cromer, Norfolk. At the time of his death, he had houses in Knightsbridge and Trimingham, Norfolk. In London, he was a member of the Athenaeum Club.

He died on 6 January 1958, at 31, Queen's Gate, Kensington, leaving an estate valued at £139,931, equivalent to £4,129,341 in 2023.
