= Cinematograph Films Council =

The Cinematograph Films Council was established by the Cinematograph Films Act 1938 as a result of a Board of Trade report by a committee chaired by Lord Moyne, which recommended that such a statutory body should be created to advise the UK government on matters relating to the film industry. Among its specific functions was the monitoring of a so-called 'quality test' (based on cost per foot of finished film) that was to be applied under the Act to films which sought registration as British under the screen quota to eliminate quota quickies.

In the 1977 New Year Honours, John Wingett Davies was appointed OBE for services to the Cinematograph Films Council.

The Council was abolished in 1985 by the government of Margaret Thatcher, which requested that some of its members should be absorbed into the newly created British Screen Advisory Council.
