= Selly Oak Hospital =

- University Hospitals Birmingham NHS Foundation Trust
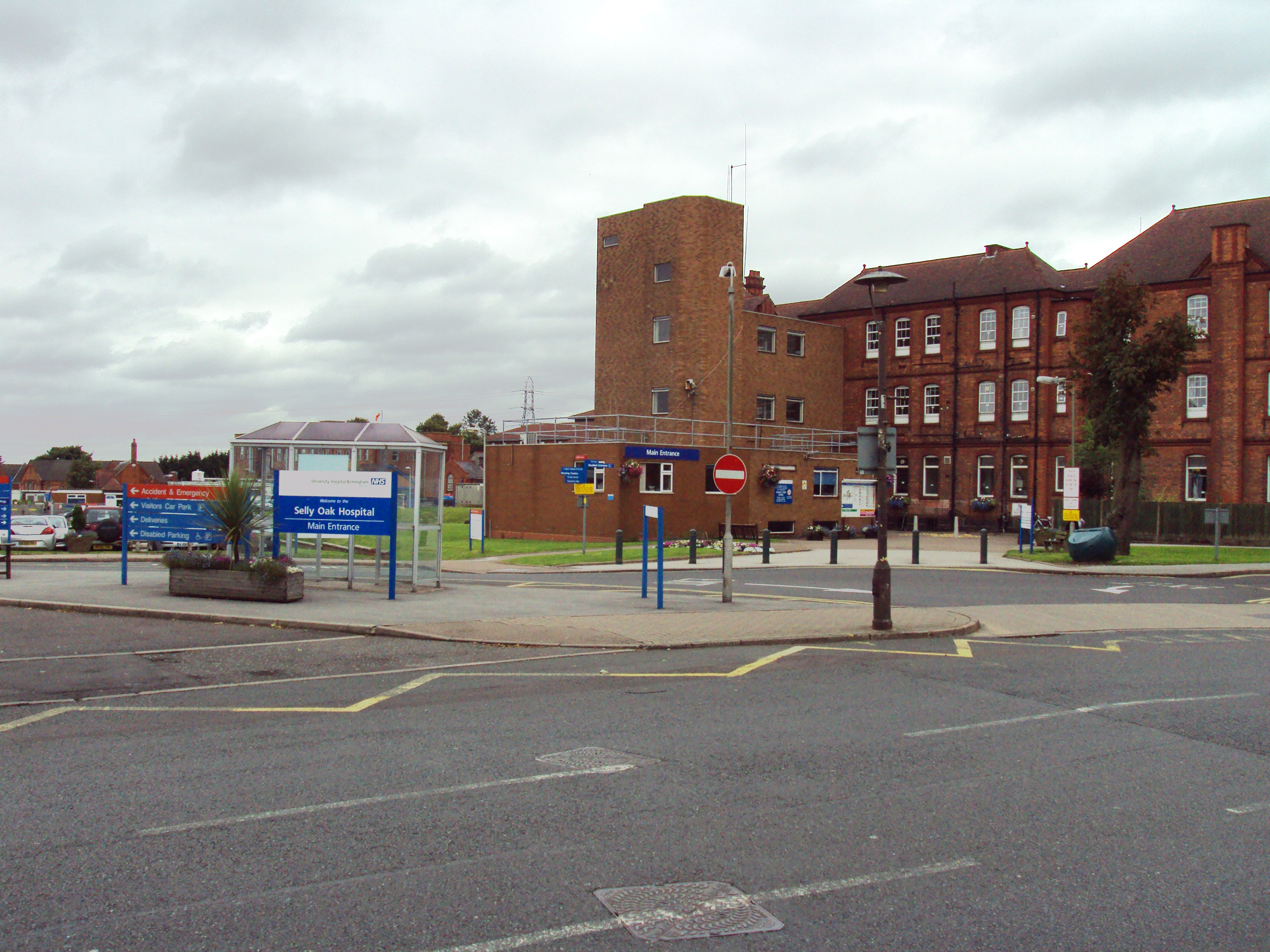
- Main entrance to Selly Oak hospital on Raddlebarn Road, seen in 2009

- Shown in West Midlands

Geography
- Location: Selly Oak, Birmingham, England
- Coordinates: 52°26′13.31″N 1°56′13.60″W

Organisation
- Care system: NHS
- Type: Teaching
- Affiliated university: University of Birmingham

Services
- Emergency department: Yes

History
- Founded: 1897
- Closed: 2011

Links
- Website: www.uhb.nhs.uk
- Lists: Hospitals in England

Selly Oak Hospital was a hospital situated in the Selly Oak area of Birmingham, England. Previously managed by the University Hospitals Birmingham NHS Foundation Trust, the hospital closed in 2011.

== History ==
=== Origins ===
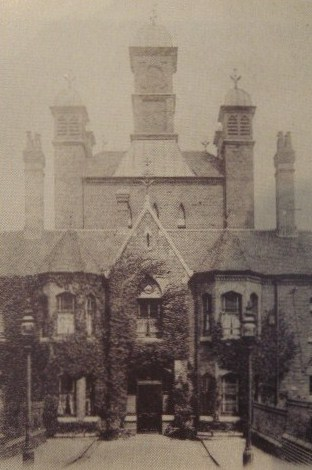
Entrance to the King's Norton Union Workhouse at Selly Oak, showing its original decorative cupolas, circa 1910.

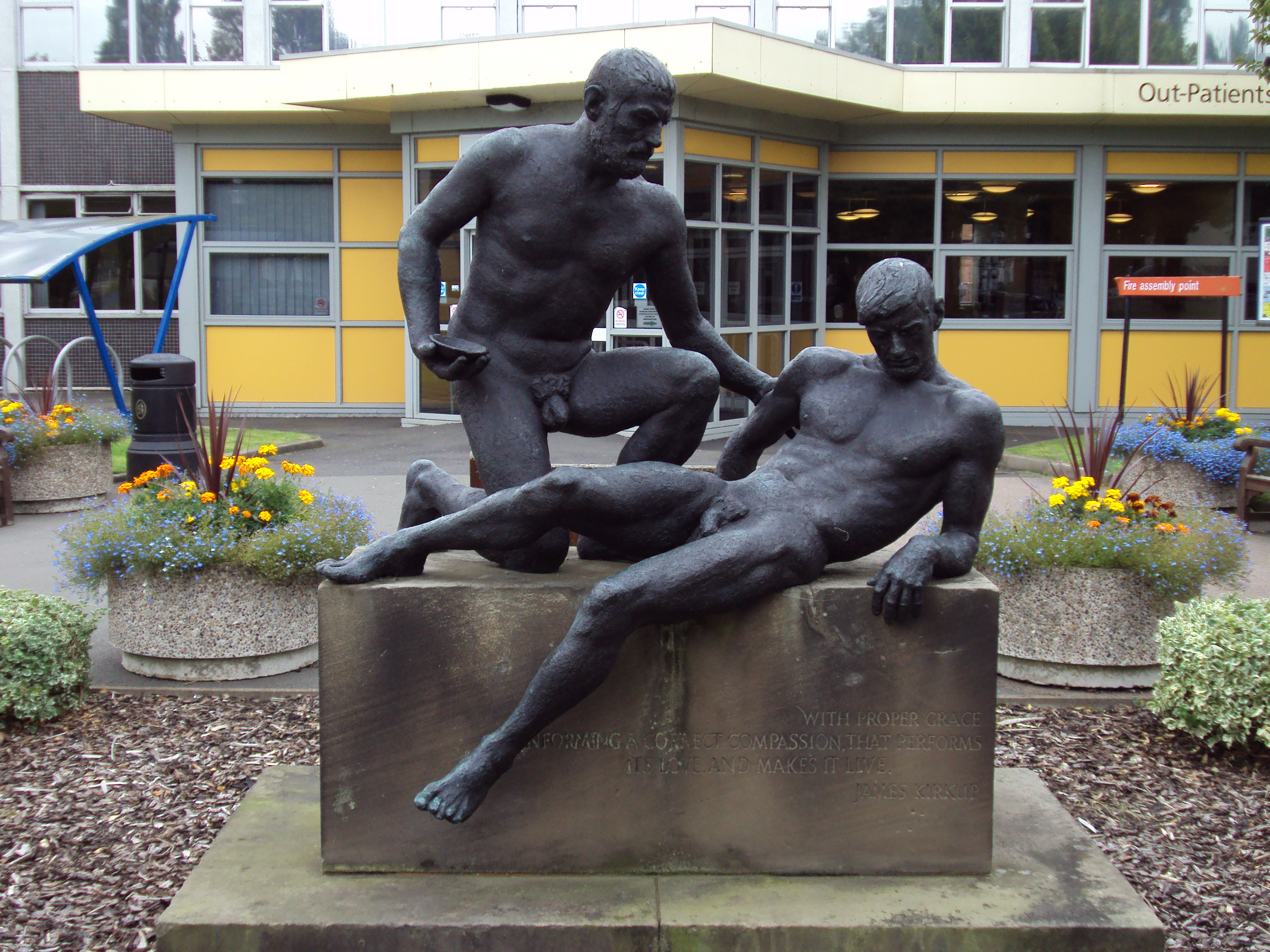
The Good Samaritan (1961), by Uli Nimptsch, in front of the Out-patients Unit at Selly Oak Hospital

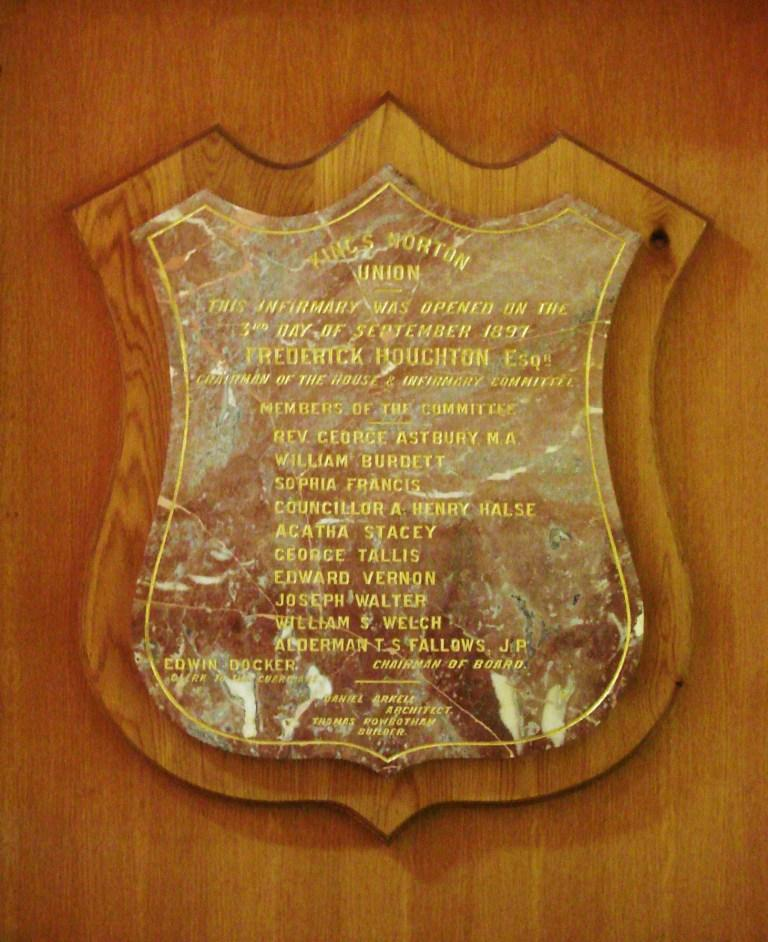
Commemorative plaque recording the opening of the King's Norton Union's Infirmary at Selly Oak, on the "3rd Day of September 1897"

The site was originally selected for the construction of the new King's Norton Union Workhouse. This was a place for the care of the poor and was one of many workhouses constructed throughout the country following the introduction of the Poor Law Amendment Act 1834. The new workhouse, which was designed by Edward Holmes, was built on the site and opened in 1870.

A workhouse infirmary, which was designed by Daniel Arkell to a pavilion plan and entirely lit by electric light, was built by Thomas Rowbotham of Small Heath at a cost of £45,000 and opened in September 1897. It provided accommodation for about 300 patients.

=== Expansion ===
A new entrance block was completed in 1902 and a large nurses' home which became known as Woodlands was completed in 1908. The workhouse became a home for the chronically sick known as Selly Oak House and the home and the infirmary combined to join the National Health Service as Selly Oak Hospital in 1948.

The Royal Centre for Defence Medicine was formed at the hospital and was officially opened by the Princess Royal in April 2001.

In March 2007, the families of certain injured servicemen alleged that the hospital was not treating Iraq War veterans properly. There were also reports of servicemen being verbally abused in the hospital by members of the public opposed to the war. Following a visit to the hospital, Jeremy Clarkson added to the criticism by writing a complaint to the NHS alleging that injured servicemen had no dedicated ward and that they were treated no differently from "a lad who got drunk and smashed his Citroën into a tree". A report published by the House of Commons Defence Select Committee blamed the allegations against the hospital on a smear campaign and praised the clinical care provided to military patients.

=== Closure and site redevelopment ===
On 23 May 2010 a 'Service of Thanks' was held at Selly Oak Hospital to celebrate a century of caring and to share memories of the facility. After services had transferred to the new Queen Elizabeth Hospital, Selly Oak Hospital closed in October 2011.

On 24 February 2015 the Trust announced that it had exchanged contracts with Persimmon for the sale of the site with outline planning permission for 650 homes.

The housebuilder, Charles Church, completed the conversion of the main building into 44 new apartments in September 2021.

Other parts of the hospital were demolished and extensive housing and apartment blocks were built by Persimmon and Charles Church on these areas in the early 2020s. The last of these apartments was Ellis Court which completed the conversion of 595 properties as part of a seven year programme by Persimmon and Charles Church. However, the former nurses' home was still being marketed as of April 2023.

== Notable staff ==
- Geoffrey Gillam FRCP (1905–1970) was a consultant cardiologist at the hospital.

== Notable patients ==
Those reported to have died at the hospital include:

- Simon Evans, author
- Florence Camm, artist

== See also ==
- Healthcare in West Midlands
- List of hospitals in England
