= Francis W. Pixley =

English accountant, barrister, and author

Francis William Pixley FSA FCA (c. 1852 – 27 April 1933) was an English accountant, barrister and author.

He lived at Wooburn House, Wooburn Green, and performed many civic duties, including serving as a Deputy Lieutenant for Buckinghamshire.

The son of Mr. T. W. Pixley, of Freshwater, Isle of Wight, Pixley was educated at St. Peter's School, York, was called to the Bar by the Middle Temple, and became a senior partner in the firm of Messrs. Jackson, Pixley and Co., chartered accountant. From 1903 to 1904, he held the office of president of the Institute of Chartered Accountants, of which he was an original member, having been elected on its formation. He represented it at St. Louis, U.S.A., at the first International Congress of Accountants in 1904. He was auditor to the Duchy of Lancaster, and treasurer of the Chartered Accountants Benevolent Association, editor of The Accountants' Dictionary, and the author of a number of books on accountancy.

Outside his profession Pixley had many interests. He was mainly instrumental in the efforts made to form a Roll of Baronets, which is now kept at the Home Office, and was Registrar of the Standing Council of the Baronetage and the author of a history of the baronetage. He was at one time lieutenant-colonel commanding the 1st Cadet Battalion of the King's Royal Rifle Corps, and later identified himself with the Boy Scout movement at headquarters and in South Buckinghamshire. He was a Knight of Justice and Receiver-General of the Order of St. John of Jerusalem in England, a member of the City Lieutenancy, and Deputy Lieutenant and J.P. for Buckinghamshire. He was late chairman of the National Institution of Apprenticeship, a member of the London Diocesan Fund, a member of Council and joint treasurer of the Queen's Institute of District Nursing and treasurer of Queen Mary's Committee, treasurer of the Buckinghamshire War Pensions Committee, of the country Lace Association, and of the country branch of the National Playing Fields Association, and late treasurer of the county Architectural and Archaeological Society, and Past Master of seven Masonic Lodges.

It was reported that Francis Pixley was a man of great charm and of a singularly calm and lovable disposition, both in business and in home life, and possessed a large circle of attached friends. Mrs. Pixley, who was a daughter of Mr. J. P. Simpson, died 1932, leaving two sons and three daughters, Colonel Pixley's second son was killed in the First World War.

On 14 January 1908, Pixley's daughter Esme Caroline married Arthur Buxton, a young clergyman, and they had four children, Nigel Arthur (1909–1995), Richenda Dorothy (1911–1987), Mary Buxton (born 1913), and Priscilla Peronne (1916–1979).

Pixley died at Wooburn House, Buckinghamshire, at the age of 80.

== Works ==
- A history of the baronetage (1900) London:Duckworth and Company

dedicated to Sir Charles H Stuart Rich, fourth Baronet of Shirley

- The accountant's dictionary; a comprehensive encyclopaedia and direction on all matters connected with the work of an accountant, illustrated with the necessary forms and documents. With contributions by eminent authorities on accountancy and accountancy matters (1922)
