= Geoffrey Gillam =

British cardiologist

Geoffrey Gillam MD FRCP
- Born: Geoffrey Gerard Gillam; 28 January 1905; Holt, Norfolk
- Died: 15 February 1970 (aged 65); Holt, Norfolk
- Citizenship: British
- Education: Epsom College; University College Hospital
- Years active: 1928–1969
- Medical career
- Profession: Doctor of Medicine
- Institutions: University College Hospital; Norfolk and Norwich Hospital; National Heart Hospital; Selly Oak Hospital; Solihull Hospital
- Sub-specialties: consultant cardiologist
- Awards: Lister Gold Medal

Geoffrey Gerard Gillam FRCP (28 January 1905 – 15 February 1970) was a British medical doctor and consultant cardiologist who became a Fellow of the Royal College of Physicians.

During the Second World War, he was commissioned into the Royal Army Medical Corps and served in Normandy and British India, rising to the rank of Lieutenant-Colonel.

== Early life ==
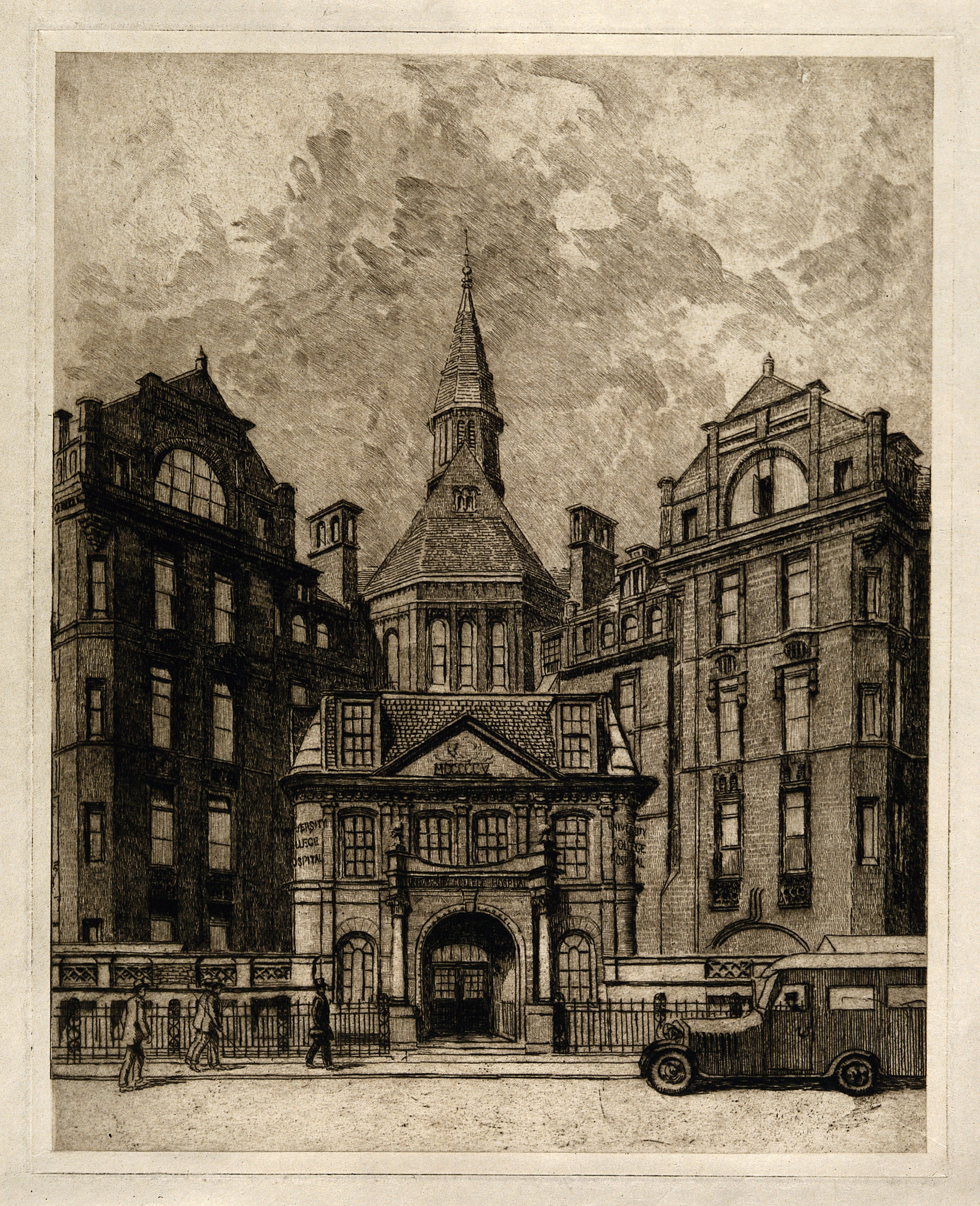
University College Hospital, in Gillam's time

Born in Holt, Norfolk, Gillam was a son of Dr Joseph Beckett Gillam by his marriage to Dorothy Jane Skrimshire, whose family had practised medicine since the eighteenth century. His father, a local GP who was also school doctor at Gresham's School, was a close friend of the school's music master Geoffrey Shaw, who was Gillam's godfather, after whom he was named.

Educated at Epsom College between 1913 and 1923, Gillam played for the cricket First XI, was head prefect and school captain, and was offered both a scholarship in Classics at Clare College, Cambridge, and a closed scholarship to read medicine at University College Hospital (UCH) which was reserved for boys from Epsom College. His father had died young, before he entered the school, and financial considerations caused him to choose UCH. While there, he took a prize called the Lister Gold Medal, and in the final stages of his training was house physician to the cardiologist Sir Thomas Lewis, then migrated to the Norfolk and Norwich Hospital as house surgeon to Athelstan Jasper Blaxland. After his Conjoint diploma in 1927, he gained the degrees of MB and BS (London) in 1928.

His brother John Gillam also became a doctor and ended his career as a consultant in Wales.

== Career ==
Gillam's career as a physician began at Bungay, Suffolk, where he established himself as a general practitioner and remained for almost ten years, gaining a reputation for devotion to his patients and an unhurried approach. He then returned to London to gain higher qualifications, in 1938 graduating MRCP and MD (London). The Second World War followed, and he joined the British Army, serving overseas in Normandy and India and ending the war as a Lieutenant-Colonel.

On returning to civilian life, Gillam joined the National Heart Hospital to return to his career in cardiology and became a close friend of Paul Hamilton Wood. Two years later, in 1947, he was offered and accepted the position of consultant cardiologist at Selly Oak Hospital, and from there he was also seconded to Solihull Hospital, where resources did not run to modern cardiology equipment. In the year 1966–1967 he was President of the West Midlands Physicians' Association and in 1967 he was elected as a Fellow of the Royal College of Physicians. Dogged by ill health, he retired in 1969.

A. M. Nussey, a physician colleague at Solihull Hospital in the 1960s, recalled that

"Gillam was tall and distinguished in appearance, and his penetrating intellect was clearly the basis of an almost uncanny diagnostic acumen. Some may have been deceived by the apparently puzzled simplicity with which he formulated his questions at medical gatherings, but, in effect, these usually served to focus attention on vital points and carried the discussion to the right conclusions..."

== Private life ==
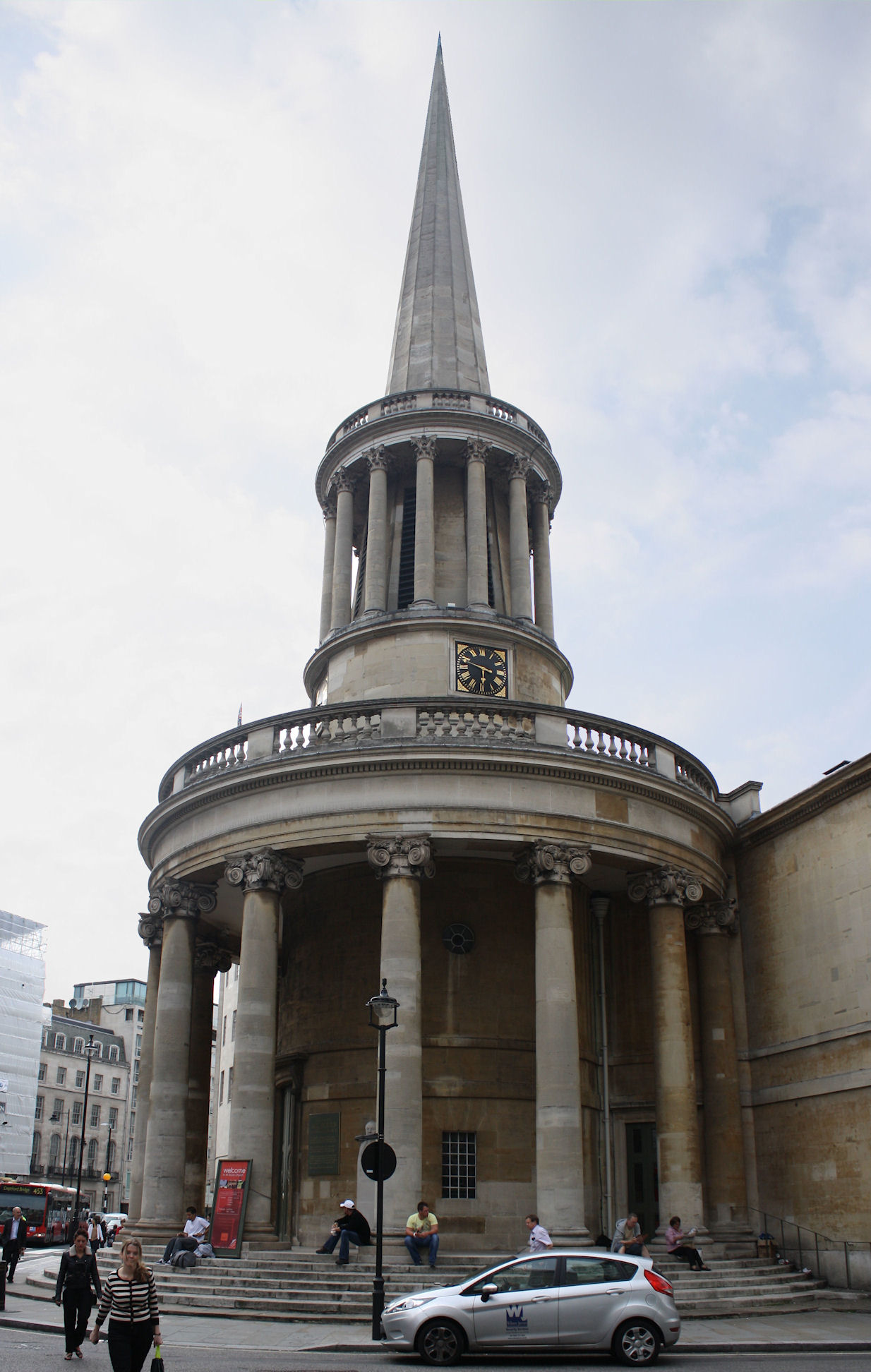
All Souls, Langham Place

On 21 September 1929, at All Souls, Langham Place, Marylebone, Gillam was married to Mary Davies, daughter of Captain William Davies, by the Rev. Wilfrid Oldaker, a cousin of the bride, assisted by the Rev. Arthur Buxton. The wedding reception was at the Langham Hotel, and there followed a honeymoon in Brittany. They went on to have three sons, one of whom, P. M. S. Gillam, became a consultant and in due course followed his father as a Fellow of the Royal College of Physicians. Another, J. F. R. Gillam, became headmaster of Ravenscroft School, Somerset.

In 1962, the family was living at 52, Augustus Road, Edgbaston.

Gillam had many interests outside his work, including the works of William Shakespeare, poetry, music, fishing, and bird-watching. In retirement, he returned to live in his native Holt, but died soon afterwards, on 15 February 1970, in the West Norwich Hospital. His widow survived him until November 1989, continuing to live at Hill House, Holt.

== Degrees ==
- MRCS & LRCP (1927)
- MB & BS, London (1928)
- Doctor of Medicine, London (1938)
- Member of the Royal College of Physicians (1938)
- Fellow of the Royal College of Physicians (1967)
