= Cinema Exhibitors' Association =

UK trade association

UK Cinema Association
- Abbreviation: UKCA
- Type: Trade association (ltd company)
- Legal status: Non-profit company
- Purpose: Cinemas in the UK
- Headquarters: Soho Square; London, W1
- Region served: United Kingdom
- Members: British cinema operators
- Chief Executive: Phil Clapp
- Website: UKCA

The UK Cinema Association (UKCA), formerly known as the Cinema Exhibitors Association, is the national trade association for cinema operators in the United Kingdom. The UKCA represents the interests of well over 90 per cent of UK cinema operators by number and market share.

== Main activities ==
The UKCA advocates on behalf of the UK cinema sector at international, national, and regional level. It lobbies the Government along with other sectors of the U.K. film industry, particularly distribution, also working with others within the industry to promote the value of cinema to the public. In addition it provides advice and support to individual members on interpreting and adhering to legislation and regulation, and in dealing with day-to-day operational issues when appropriate.

=== Industry statistics ===
Like many trade associations, it gathers economic data on the industry it represents. The top three films ever in the UK are, in order, Avatar, Toy Story 3, and Mamma Mia!. In 2009, UK cinema turnover was around £1.2billion from around 900,000 cinema seats, at around 3,700 cinema screens at around 770 cinema sites. Total attendances are around 170 million. The top three chains have 62% of the number of screens.

== Disability and the CEA Card ==
British cinemas have led the world in providing facilities and services for disabled people, both by making their buildings physically accessible and by installing equipment that enables audio described and sub-titled performances. The UKCA also created the "CEA Card" for those disabled people who need the services of a carer if they want to visit the cinema, providing free access.

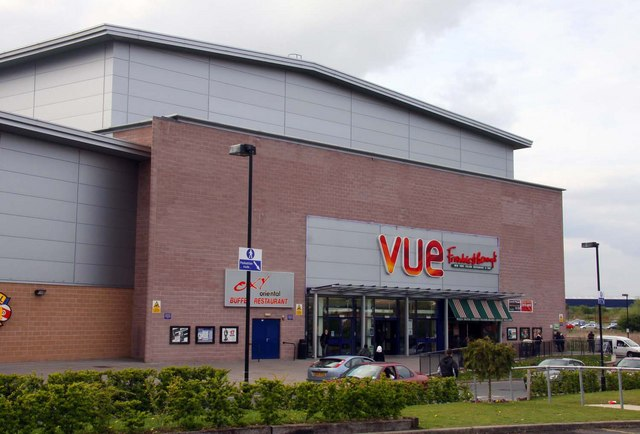
Vue cinema in Littlemore, south Oxford

== Structure ==
It is situated in Soho Square on floor four of the BBFC building. It has five regional branches. The UKCA became a limited company on 3 June 2004.

=== Membership ===
The Association's membership covers single screen/owner managed sites, small independent circuits and the largest circuit and multiplex operators including Odeon Cinemas, Cineworld, Vue Cinemas, Showcase Cinemas and Empire Cinemas. Members are able to benefit from discounts with key collecting societies such as Phonographic Performance Limited (PPL) and Video Performance Limited (VPL), and participate in marketing initiatives such as the recently secured Meerkat Movies promotion in partnership with Compare the Market.

== See also ==
- Cinema of the United Kingdom
- British Society of Cinematographers

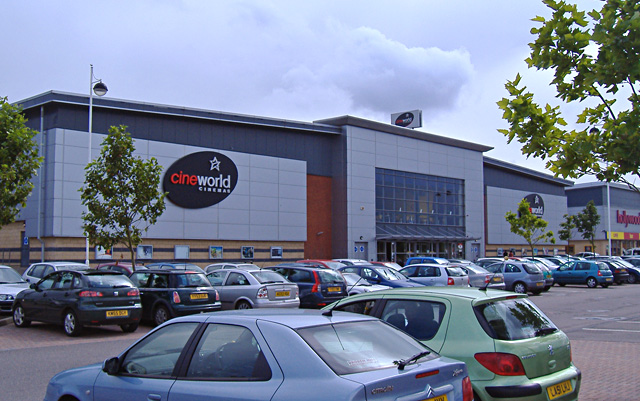
Cineworld cinema in Hull
