= Fred Newman (businessman) =

Frederick Edward Fry Newman CBE MC (1916 – 19 October 2012) was a British shipbroking and aviation entrepreneur who was chairman of the long-established shipping firm Davies and Newman. He also founded and was a major shareholder and chairman of the independent airline Dan-Air for 37 years.

Born in 1916, Newman was the son of Frank Newman, a founding partner of Davies and Newman. After attending The Leys School, he joined the family firm, then during the Second World War served in the Honourable Artillery Company, rising to the rank of Captain and being awarded the Military Cross for active service in Burma. In May 1953, he founded Dan-Air as an offshoot of the shipping business and went on to serve as its chairman from 1953 until 1990. At its peak, Dan-Air employed 4,500 people and flew more than six million passengers a year.

He was appointed a CBE in the 1986 New Year Honours.

Newman died on 19 October 2012, aged 96.
