= Common Entrance Examination =

Tests used by independent schools in the UK

Common Entrance Examinations (commonly known as CE) are taken by independent school pupils in the UK as part of the selective admissions process at age 13, though ten independent schools do select at 11 using different test papers. They are set by the Independent Schools Examinations Board. Most of the secondary schools that use Common Entrance for admission are public schools; most of the schools that routinely prepare their pupils for Common Entrance are preparatory schools. Both kinds of schools are normally fee-paying, that is, they are particular kinds of private schools. The examination papers are prepared by the board, but the scripts are marked by the schools concerned; and all other aspects of the admissions process are handled independently by each school.

== Independent Schools Examinations Board ==
The logo of ISEB

The Independent Schools Examinations Board (ISEB) offers examinations for pupils transferring from junior to independent senior school at the ages of 11+ and 13+ in the United Kingdom. The main examination is Common Entrance, established in 1904.

== Subjects ==
At 11+, Common Entrance consists of two English examinations, as well as an examination each in Mathematics and Science.

At 13+, Common Entrance consists of examinations in Mathematics (three papers: a (listening) mental mathematics paper, plus written non-calculator and calculator); English (two papers); and one paper each in Latin, Classical Greek, Geography, History, Religious Studies, plus either Physics, Chemistry, Biology or Core (Easier Combined) Science. In addition, there is a choice of four modern languages: French, German, Mandarin, and Spanish, which are assessed by written, oral and listening papers. Only Maths, English and a science are compulsory papers, although some schools may require the candidate to take others.

In some 13+ subjects, there are three alternative levels:

- Level 1 (foundation, aimed at those who would score under 40% on Level 2)
- Level 2 (harder, more knowledge required)
- Level 3 is a higher level, requiring more knowledge and skills than Level 2.

Levels available by subject

- Levels 1 and 2 are offered in French, English, Spanish, Mandarin and Science (Level 1 candidates sit a single Science paper, Level 2 three separate papers).
- In Latin and Mathematics, Levels 1, 2 and 3 are offered.
- All other subjects consist only of one level.

Scholarship papers

A still higher level 13+ scheme, called Common Academic Scholarship, is designed for scholarship candidates, and single Scholarship papers are set in each of Mathematics, Geography, English, French, Science, History, Religious Studies and Latin. Scholarship candidates sit these Common Academic Scholarship papers (CASE) instead of the Common Entrance papers. The syllabus for these are identical to that for the Common Entrance papers, except in Latin, where the required knowledge goes beyond Level 3. The papers, however, should be more challenging than the normal papers.

Most senior schools expect candidates to offer Mathematics, English, Science, Geography, History, Religious Studies and one or two languages, but pupils from schools which do not offer the traditional range of subjects or weaker pupils can offer a reduced number of papers: entrance requirements are dictated only by the senior school. Sometimes, it can even be up to 70% in every subject. Schools may also stipulate that pupils do not sit Level 1 papers, or that they must sit Level 3 papers where available.

== Taking the exam ==
There are three times a year the papers are sat. January, June (the most common month to sit) or November. The papers are sat Tuesday to Friday.

Candidates usually sit the CE exam papers at their own prep schools, at a fixed date, but not a fixed time; papers are marked by the preferred senior school, who mark them immediately and will, if necessary, arrange with the prep school to forward the papers to a second-choice school should the performance fall below the acceptance level of the preferred first-choice school.

Many schools also use the CE exam as the basis for awarding entrance scholarships and bursaries, but often also apply their own further interviews, tests, or examinations. Likewise artistic, musical or sporting achievements are not examined by Common Entrance, but may be taken into account by reports or other means.

== Admissions ==
Children often have to attend interviews at their preferred secondary schools, in addition to taking the Common Entrance examination. Headteachers' reports are also considered.

In practice, the Common Entrance exam only rarely entirely determines admission, and failure is uncommon. Prep schools assess pupils and liaise with parents to determine an academically appropriate school for a pupil, ie one for which a pupil is unlikely to fail. Prep schools are able to assess and report their candidates' prospects accurately especially where they are familiar with prospective senior schools. Prep schools should only advise parents to register a pupil for a school that is an 'achievable' target.

Some secondary schools, particularly the most competitive, base their admission decision primarily on an 11+ pretest. The format of these tests vary, but they tend to consist of IQ style tests as well assessments of maths and English. A successful 11+ pre-test is therefore a conditional offer, subject to satisfactory performance at Common Entrance, the pre-testing is however designed to identify children who are likely to succeed at Common Entrance, and it is normally not intended that children offered places following pre-test will be rejected at 13+, barring a calamitous performance at that age.

Concerns raised about 11+ pre-testing include: putting stress on younger pupils; assessing pupils at a stage where there are greater developmental variables, and utilising a tool that does not assess the skills/knowledge that is needed to be successful at GCSE or A-Level. The failure to test an appropriate skill/knowledge set implies that many potentially successful candidates are potentially ruled out.

The exam is not a regulated qualification, and the results, unlike the GCSEs or A Levels taken several years later, are not granted in form of a certificate. The examination will help the senior school with admissions, and also with possible streaming/subject setting.

The Common Entrance allows preparatory schools to teach almost all pupils to a common syllabus, and provides common basis on which a public school can compare candidates from different prep schools. There is no standardisation in marking and every senior school has its own mark scheme and own 'pass' threshold. This varies considerably between schools and therefore no reliable comparisons can be made between results achieved at different schools.

== Bibliography ==
- Austin, Jonathan Edward (1995). The English boys boarding preparatory school, 1914–1940 (PhD). Open University. pp. 454–460. doi:10.21954/ou.ro.0000e0a3.
- Leinster-Mackay, Donald (1984). "Bull at the Common Entrance Gate". The Rise of the English Prep School (PDF). London: Falmer Press. pp. 181–190.
- Parsons, Samantha; Green, Francis; Ploubidis, George B.; Sullivan, Alice; Wiggins, R. D. (2017). "The influence of private primary schooling on children's learning: Evidence from three generations of children living in the UK". British Educational Research Journal. 43 (5): 823–847. doi:10.1002/berj.3300.
