= 1826 =

Calendar year

1826 in various calendars
- Gregorian calendar: 1826; MDCCCXXVI
- Ab urbe condita: 2579
- Armenian calendar: 1275; ԹՎ ՌՄՀԵ
- Assyrian calendar: 6576
- Balinese saka calendar: 1747–1748
- Bengali calendar: 1232–1233
- Berber calendar: 2776
- British Regnal year: 6 Geo. 4 – 7 Geo. 4
- Buddhist calendar: 2370
- Burmese calendar: 1188
- Byzantine calendar: 7334–7335
- Chinese calendar: 乙酉年 (Wood Rooster); 4523 or 4316 — to — 丙戌年 (Fire Dog); 4524 or 4317
- Coptic calendar: 1542–1543
- Discordian calendar: 2992
- Ethiopian calendar: 1818–1819
- Hebrew calendar: 5586–5587
- Hindu calendars
- Vikram Samvat: 1882–1883
- Shaka Samvat: 1747–1748
- Kali Yuga: 4926–4927
- Holocene calendar: 11826
- Igbo calendar: 826–827
- Iranian calendar: 1204–1205
- Islamic calendar: 1241–1242
- Japanese calendar: Bunsei 9 (文政９年)
- Javanese calendar: 1753–1754
- Julian calendar: Gregorian minus 12 days
- Korean calendar: 4159
- Minguo calendar: 86 before ROC 民前86年
- Nanakshahi calendar: 358
- Thai solar calendar: 2368–2369
- Tibetan calendar: ཤིང་མོ་བྱ་ལོ་ (female Wood-Bird); 1952 or 1571 or 799 — to — མེ་ཕོ་ཁྱི་ལོ་ (male Fire-Dog); 1953 or 1572 or 800

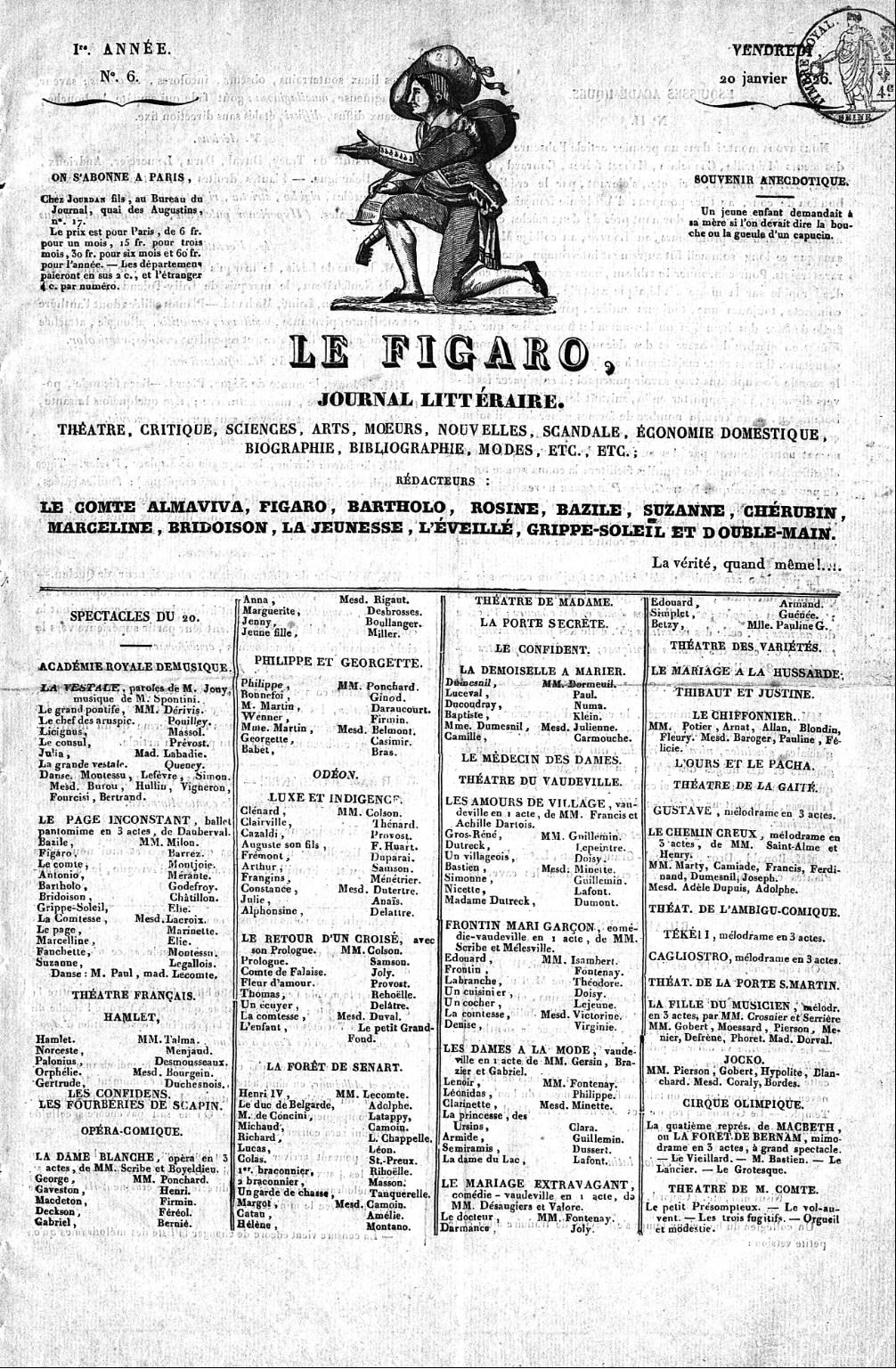
January 15: The French magazine Le Figaro begins publication.

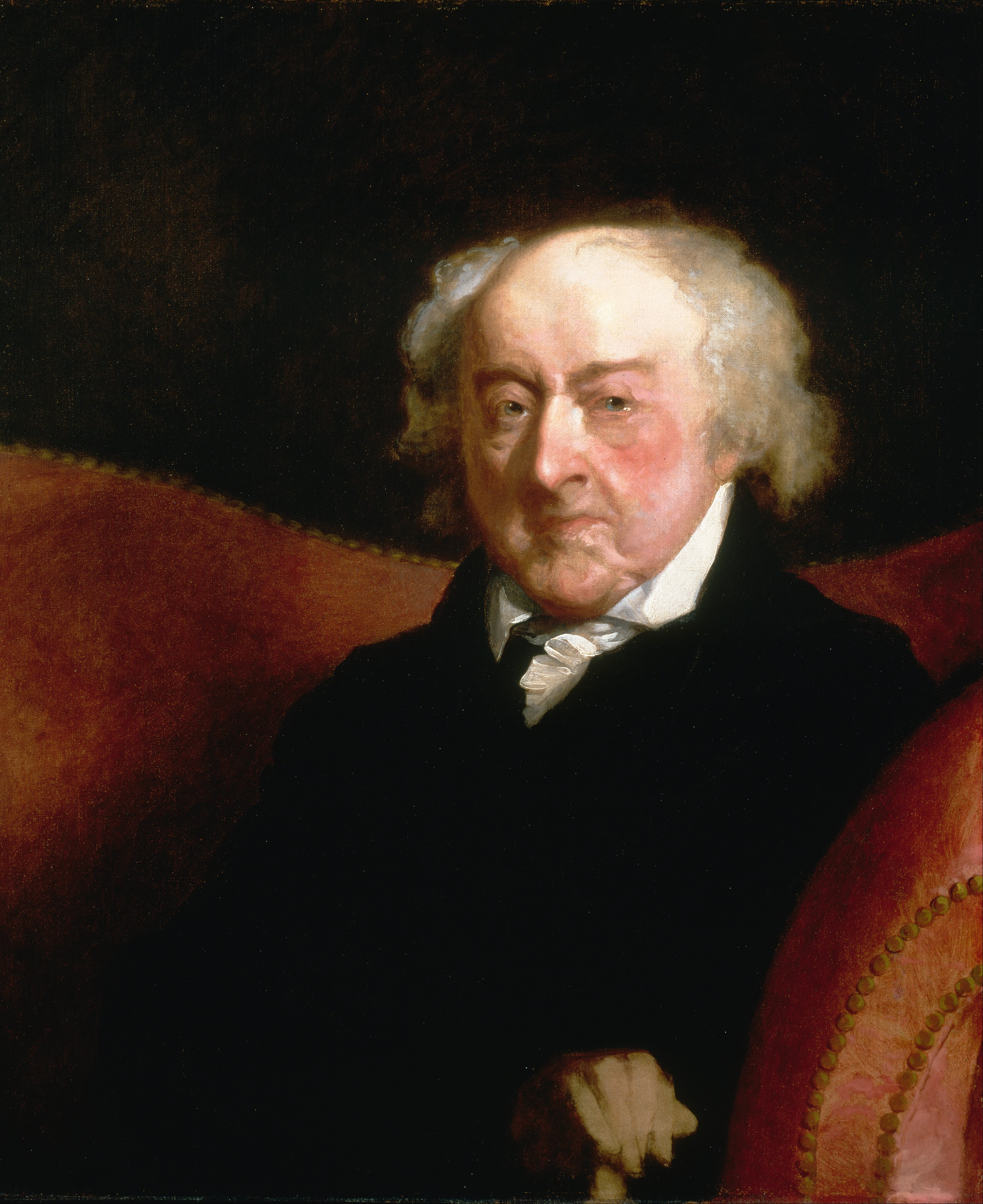
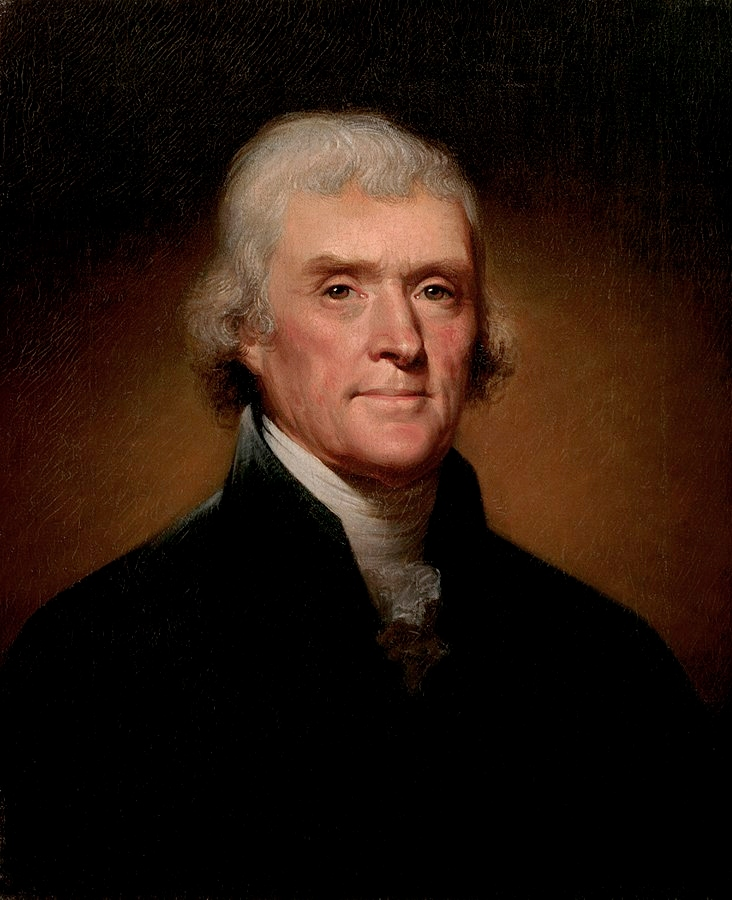
July 4: On the 50th anniversary of the U.S. Declaration of Independence, John Adams (the second U.S. president) and Thomas Jefferson (the third U.S. president) die within hours of each other.

1826 (MDCCCXXVI) was a common year starting on Sunday of the Gregorian calendar and a common year starting on Friday of the Julian calendar, the 1826th year of the Common Era (CE) and Anno Domini (AD) designations, the 826th year of the 2nd millennium, the 26th year of the 19th century, and the 7th year of the 1820s decade. As of the start of 1826, the Gregorian calendar was 12 days ahead of the Julian calendar, which remained in localized use until 1923.

== Events ==
=== January–March ===
- January 15 – The French newspaper Le Figaro begins publication in Paris, initially as a satirical weekly.
- January 17 – The Ballantyne printing business in Edinburgh (Scotland) crashes, ruining novelist Sir Walter Scott as a principal investor. He undertakes to repay his creditors from his writings. His publisher, Archibald Constable, also fails.
- January 18 – In India, the Siege of Bharatpur ends in British victory as Lord Combermere and Michael Childers defeat the princely state of Bharatpur, part of the modern-day Indian state of Rajasthan.
- January 30 – The Menai Suspension Bridge, built by engineer Thomas Telford as the first major suspension bridge in world history, is opened between the island of Anglesey and the mainland of Wales.
- February 4 – James Fenimore Cooper's novel The Last of the Mohicans is first printed, by a publisher in Philadelphia.
- February 8 – Unitarian Bernardino Rivadavia becomes the first President of the United Provinces of the Río de la Plata, now Argentina.
- February 11
  - University College London is founded, under the name University of London.
  - Swaminarayan writes the Shikshapatri, an important text within Swaminarayan Hinduism.
- February 13 – The American Temperance Society is founded.
- February 23 – Russian mathematician Nikolai Ivanovich Lobachevsky develops non-Euclidean geometry (independently of János Bolyai).
- February 24 – The Treaty of Yandabo ends the First Anglo-Burmese War. Britain gains Assam, Manipur, Rakhine and Tanintharyi.
- March 1 – A male Indian elephant, Chunee, which was brought to London in 1811, is killed at a menagerie after running amok the week before, killing one of his keepers. After arsenic and shooting fail, the animal is stabbed to death.
- March 7 – Ellen Turner, a wealthy 15-year-old heiress from Cheshire in England, is kidnapped by Edward Gibbon Wakefield. On May 14, Wakefield, his brother and a servant are sentenced to three years' imprisonment for the crime. Wakefield later becomes politically active in the colonisation of New Zealand.
- March 10 – Dom João VI, King of Portugal and former Emperor of Brazil, dies six days after he had been served dinner while visiting Jerónimos Monastery. An investigative autopsy 174 years later will discover that he had been killed by arsenic poisoning. King João's, Emperor Pedro I of Brazil, sails back to Portugal and briefly reigns as King Pedro IV of Portugal, before turning over the Portuguese throne to his daughter, Maria.
- March – Ludwig van Beethoven's String Quartet No. 13 in B♭ major, Op. 130 is first performed and is premiered by the Schuppanzigh Quartet. In its original form, the piece has Grosse Fuge (later Op. 133) as the final movement.

=== April–June ===
- April 1 – In the U.S., Samuel Morey patents an internal combustion engine.
- April 10 – The Third Siege of Missolonghi ends and is followed by the massacre of thousands of Greek defenders by the Ottoman besiegers.
- May 5 – The Liverpool and Manchester Railway, designed by George Stephenson and Joseph Locke, destined to open as the world's first purpose-built passenger railway operated by steam locomotives in 1830, receives authorisation by the Parliament of the United Kingdom.
- May 28 – The Emperor Pedro I of Brazil abdicates as King of Portugal.
- June 14–15 – The Auspicious Incident: Mahmud II, sultan of the Ottoman Empire, crushes the last mutiny of janissaries in Istanbul.
- June 20 – The Burney Treaty is signed in Bangkok between the United Kingdom and the Rattanakosin Kingdom of Siam, securing British power in southeast Asia.
- June 21 – Greek War of Independence: The attempted Ottoman–Egyptian invasion of Mani begins.
- June 22 – The Pan-American Congress of Panama is opened in Panama City by Simon Bolivar as an attempt to unify the republics of the Americas that have recently declared independence from Spain, or to at least make a federation to agree on a common defense policy and create a common military. The Congress lasts for 23 days without an agreement.

=== July–September ===
- July 4 – Former U.S. Presidents Thomas Jefferson and John Adams both die on the 50th anniversary of the signing of the United States Declaration of Independence.
- July 15 – The Congress of Panama adjourns after 24 days without an agreement on creating a federation of Latin American nations.
- July 25 (O.S.: July 13) – Five leaders of the Decembrist revolt of 1825 in Russia (Pyotr Kakhovsky, Pavel Pestel, poet Kondraty Ryleyev, Sergey Muravyov-Apostol and Mikhail Bestuzhev-Ryumin) are hanged in Senate Square, Saint Petersburg, where they had launched their attempted coup d'état. Other conspirators begin their journey into exile in Siberia.
- July 26 – Cayetano Ripoll becomes the last person to be executed by the Spanish Inquisition's successor at its last auto-da-fé, held in Valencia.
- July – Ludwig van Beethoven puts the finishing touches on the String Quartet No. 14 in C♯ minor, Op. 131, the jewel in the crown of his late string quartets.
- August 6 — The 17 year old composer Felix Mendelssohn completes the overture to A Midsummer Night's Dream.
- August 10 – The first Cowes Regatta is held in the Isle of Wight, in the U.K.
- August 18 – Scottish explorer Alexander Gordon Laing becomes the first European to reach Timbuktu but is murdered there on September 26.
- August 28 – The town of Crawford Notch, New Hampshire suffers a landslide; those killed include all seven members of the Willey Family, after whom Mount Willey is named.
- September 13 – William Morgan of Batavia, New York, disappears mysteriously after being released from the jail in Canandaigua and agreeing to accompany his benefactor, a Mr. Loton Lawson. He is never seen in public again, and a number of witnesses will indicate later that on September 20, a man resembling Morgan was tied up and thrown into the Niagara River following a meeting of the Masonic Society.
- September 21 – Construction of the Rideau Canal begins in Canada.

=== October–December ===
- October 1 – The Monkland and Kirkintilloch Railway opens in Scotland.
- October 7 – The first train operates over the Granite Railway in Massachusetts.
- November 3 – The Paris Stock Exchange opens at the Palais de la Bourse.
- December 16 – Benjamin W. Edwards rides into Mexican-controlled Nacogdoches, Texas, and declares himself ruler of the Republic of Fredonia.
- December 21 – American settlers in Mexican Texas begin the Fredonian Rebellion, making the first attempt to secede from Mexico. The Republic of Fredonia will survive for less than six weeks.
- December 25
  - The Eggnog Riot breaks out at the United States Military Academy in West Point, New York during the early morning hours.
  - Major Edmund Lockyer arrives at King George Sound to take possession of the western part of Australia, establishing a settlement near Albany.

=== Date unknown or spanning multiple periods ===
- The British East India Company colony of the Straits Settlements is established.
- Aniline is first isolated, from the destructive distillation of indigo, by Otto Unverdorben.
- Mahmud II's council orders the janissaries to drill in the European manner.

== Births ==
=== January–June ===
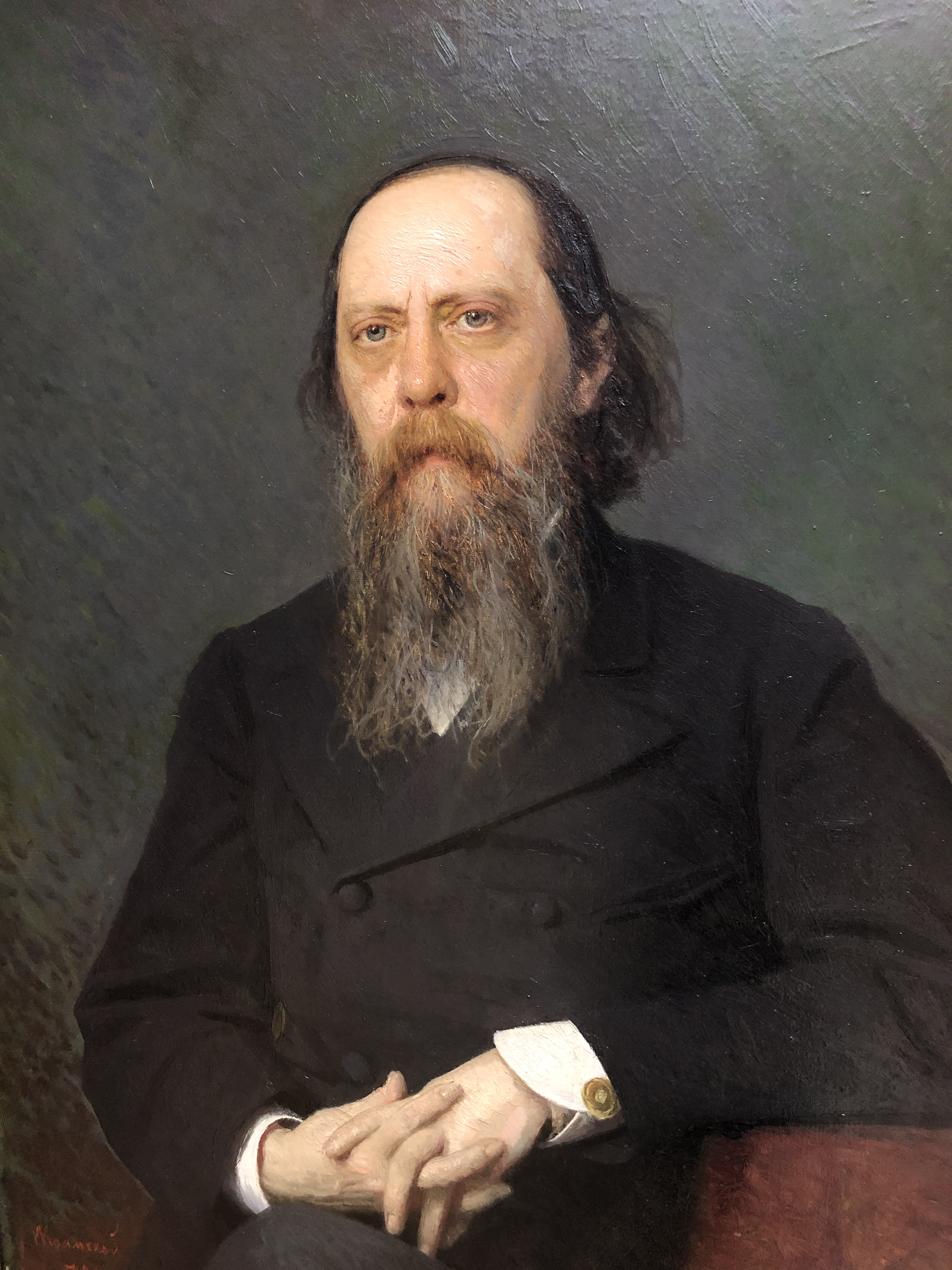
Mikhail Saltykov-Shchedrin

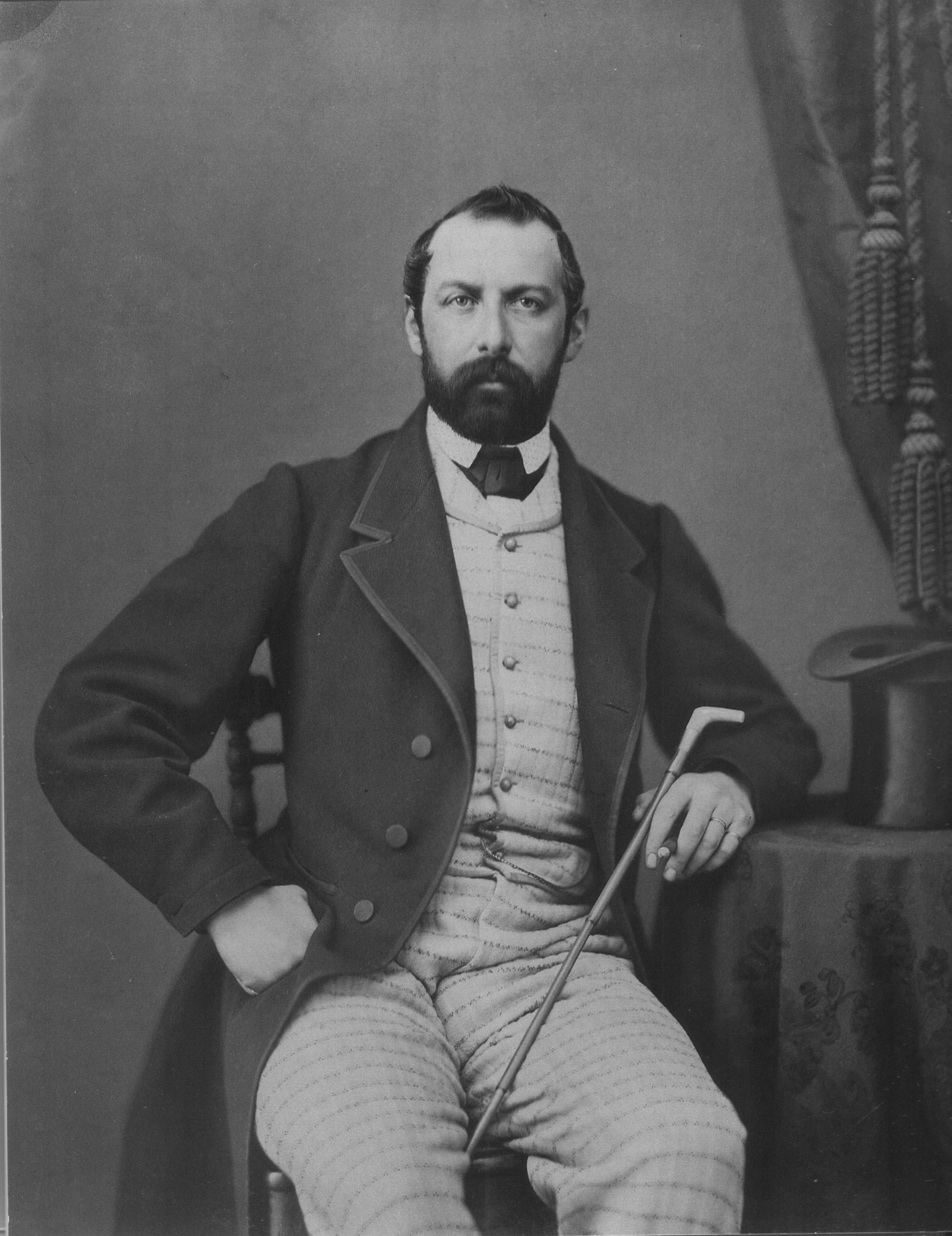
Charles XV, King of Sweden

- January 1 – Mikhail Loris-Melikov, Russian statesman, general (d. 1888)
- January 12 – William Chapman Ralston, American banker, financier (d. 1875)
- January 15 – Marie Pasteur, French chemist (d. 1910)
- January 24 – William Daniel, American temperance movement leader (d. 1897)
- January 26 – Louis Favre, Swiss engineer (d. 1879)
- January 27
  - Mikhail Saltykov-Shchedrin, Russian writer (d. 1889)
  - Richard Taylor, American Confederate general (d. 1879)
- January 30 – Robert F. R. Lewis, American naval officer (d. 1881)
- February 3 – Walter Bagehot, English economist and journalist (d. 1877)
- February 7 – James Edward Jouett, American admiral (d. 1902)
- February 9 – John A. Logan, American soldier, political leader (d. 1886)
- February 15 – George Johnstone Stoney, Anglo-Irish physicist (d. 1911)
- February 16
  - Hans Peter Jørgen Julius Thomsen, Danish chemist (d. 1909)
  - Joseph Victor von Scheffel, German poet (d. 1886)
  - Julia Grant, First Lady of the United States (d. 1902)
- March 3 – Joseph Wharton, American industrialist (d. 1909)
- March 4
  - John Buford, American general (d. 1863)
  - Theodore Judah, American railroad engineer (d. 1863)
- March 24 – Matilda Joslyn Gage, American feminist (d. 1898)
- March 29 – Wilhelm Liebknecht, German journalist, politician (d. 1900)
- April 3
  - Cyrus K. Holliday, cofounder of Topeka, Kansas, first president of the Atchison, Topeka and Santa Fe Railway (d. 1900)
  - Reginald Heber, English priest (b. 1783)
- April 6 – Gustave Moreau, French painter (d. 1898)
- April 23 – Victoriano Sánchez Barcáiztegui, Spanish Navy officer and hero (d. 1875)
- May 3 – Charles XV and IV, King of Sweden and Norway (d. 1872)
- May 4 – Frederic Edwin Church, American painter (d. 1900)
- May 7 – Varina Davis, First Lady of the Confederate States of America (d. 1906)
- May 8 – Miguel Ângelo Lupi, Portuguese painter (d. 1883)
- May 24 – Marie Goegg-Pouchoulin, Swiss international women's rights activist, pacifist (d. 1899)
- May 26 – Richard Christopher Carrington, English astronomer (d. 1875)
- May 28 – Benjamin Gratz Brown, American politician (d. 1885)
- June 24 – George Goyder, surveyor-general of South Australia (d. 1898)
- June 26 – Warren F. Daniell, American politician (d. 1913)
- June 30 – Ozra Amander Hadley, American politician (d. 1915)

=== July–December ===
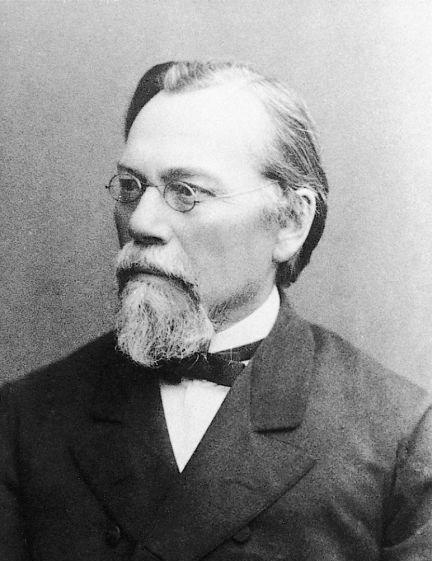
August Ahlqvist

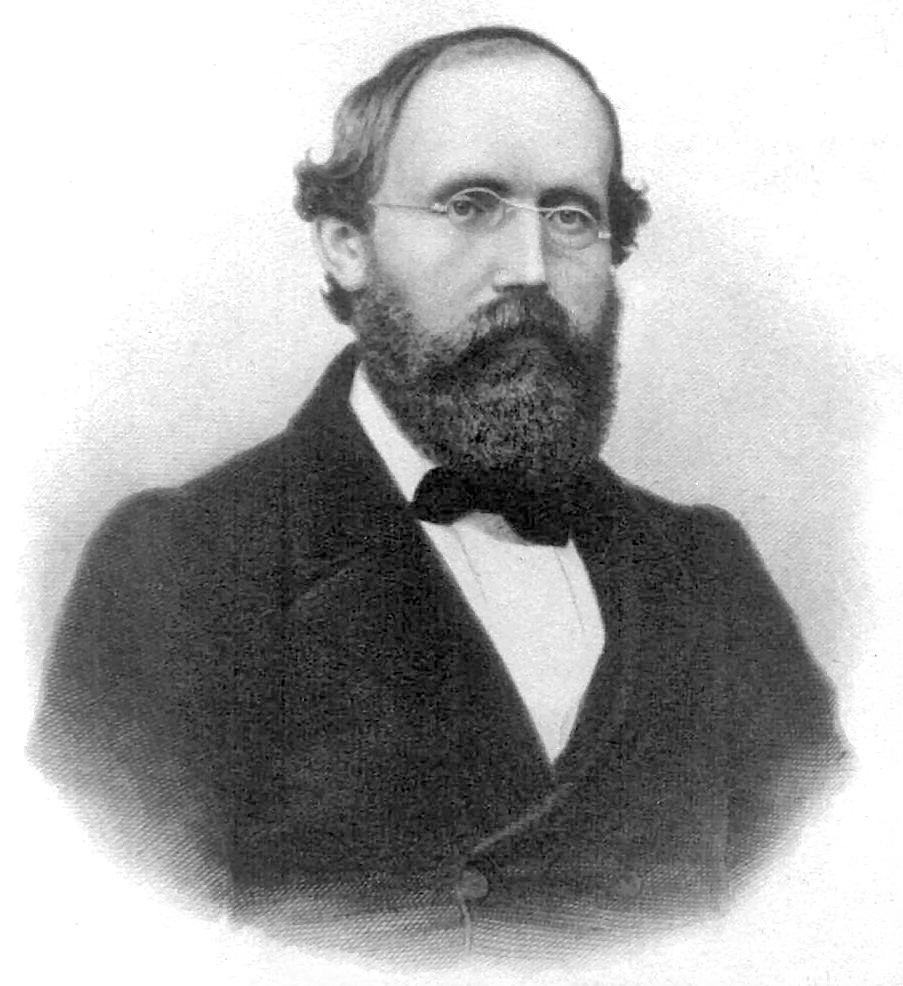
Bernhard Riemann

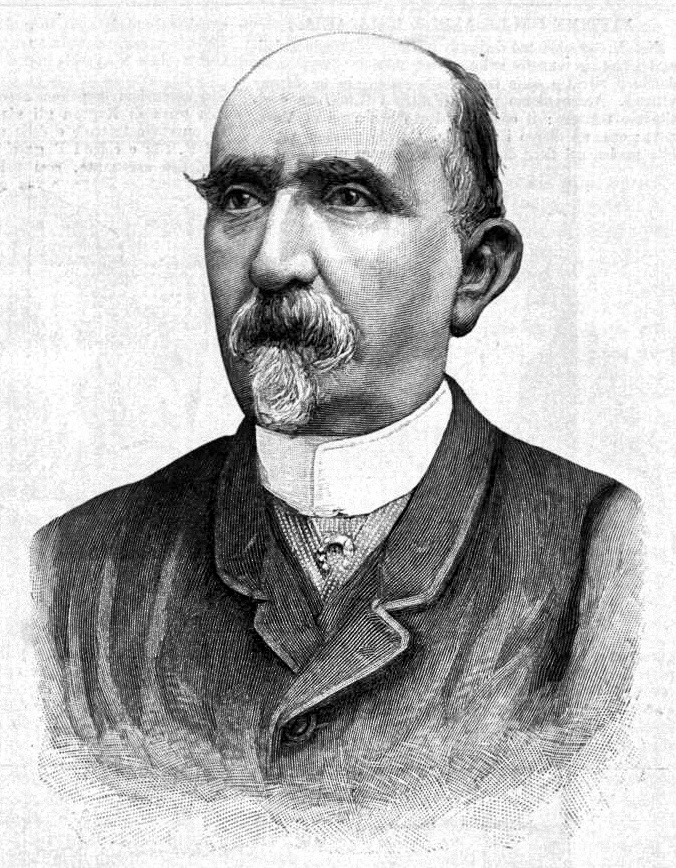
Carlo Collodi

- July 4
  - Stephen Foster, American songwriter, poet (d. 1864)
  - Green Clay Smith, American temperance movement leader (d. 1895)
- July 8 – Benjamin Grierson, American Civil War general (d. 1911)
- July 31 – William S. Clark, American chemist, 3rd President of the Massachusetts Agricultural College (d. 1886)
- August 7 – August Ahlqvist, Finnish professor, poet, scholar of the Finno-Ugric languages, author, and literary critic (d. 1889)
- August 11 – Andrew Jackson Davis, American spiritualist (d. 1910)
- August 21 – Carl Gegenbaur, German anatomist, professor (d. 1903)
- September 8 – Sir James Corry, 1st Baronet, British politician (d. 1891)
- September 13 – Zeng Laishun, Chinese interpreter and educator (d. 1895)
- September 17 – Bernhard Riemann, German mathematician (d. 1866)
- October 8 – Emily Blackwell, American physician (d. 1910)
- October 24 – Léopold Victor Delisle, French medievalist and Administrator General of the Bibliothèque Nationale
- November 10 – Jacob Hamburger, German rabbi and author (d. 1911)
- November 24 – Carlo Collodi, Italian writer (d. 1890)
- November 27 – Jonathan Young, United States Navy commodore (d. 1885)
- December 3 – George B. McClellan, American general, politician (d. 1885)
- December 8 – John Brown, Scottish personal servant and favourite of Queen Victoria (d. 1883)

=== Approximate date ===
- Cetshwayo kaMpande, Zulu king (d. 1884)
- Ellen Morton Littlejohn, American quilter (d. 1899)

== Deaths ==
=== January–June ===
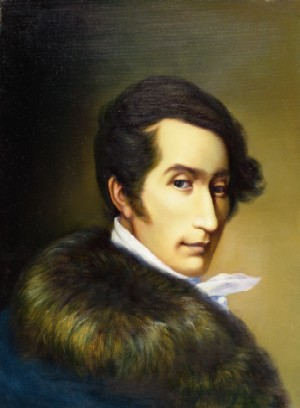
Carl Maria von Weber

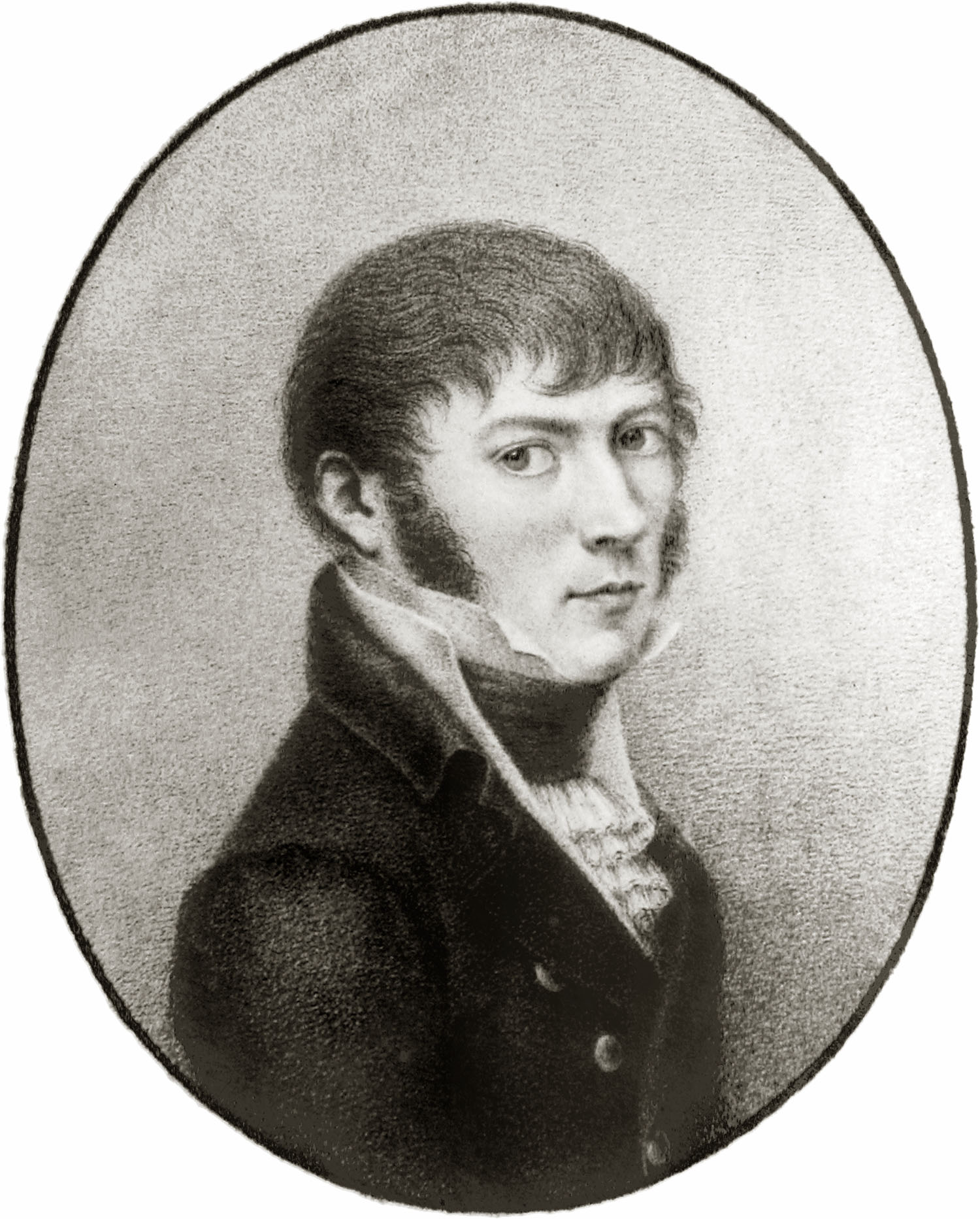
Joseph von Fraunhofer

- January 3
  - Marie Le Masson Le Golft, French naturalist (b. 1750)
  - Louis-Gabriel Suchet, French marshal (b. 1770)
- January 17 – Juan Crisóstomo Arriaga, Spanish composer (b. 1806)
- January 23 – Abraham Woodhull, Patriot spy during the American Revolutionary War (b. 1750)
- February 17 – John Manners-Sutton, British politician (b. 1752)
- March 10 – King John VI of Portugal (b. 1767)
- March 29 – Johann Heinrich Voss, German poet (b. 1751)
- April 11 – Anton Walter, Austrian piano maker (b. 1752)
- April 25 – Karl Ludwig von Phull, German military leader (b. 1757)
- May 4
  - Thomas Jeffrey, English-born bushranger, serial killer and cannibal in Van Diemen's Land, hanged (b. c.1791)
  - Sebastián Kindelán y O'Regan, Spanish colonial governor in Cuba (b. 1757)
- May 7 – Sophie Hagman, Swedish ballerina, royal mistress (b. 1758)
- May 16
  - Empress Elizabeth Alexeievna, consort of Alexander I of Russia (b. 1779)
  - Joseph Holt, 1798 United Irish rebel general (b. 1756)
- June 3 – Nikolay Karamzin, Russian language reformer (b. 1766)
- June 5 – Carl Maria von Weber, German composer (b. 1786)
- June 7 – Joseph von Fraunhofer, German optician (b. 1787)

=== July–December ===
- July 4
  - Thomas Jefferson, 83, 3rd President of the United States (b. 1743), at 12:50 p.m. at his home near Charlottesville, Virginia.
  - John Adams, 90, 2nd President of the United States (b. 1735), at 6:20 p.m. at his home in Quincy, Massachusetts.
- July 5
  - Joseph Proust, French chemist (b. 1754)
  - Stamford Raffles, British colonial governor, founder of Singapore (b. 1781)
- July 8 – Luther Martin, delegate to the American Constitutional Convention (b. 1746)
- July 22 – Giuseppe Piazzi, Italian astronomer (b. 1746)
- July 25 – Sergey Muravyov-Apostol, Russian Army officer (b. 1796)
- July 26 – James Winchester, American general and politician (b. 1752)
- August 2 – George Finch, 9th Earl of Winchilsea, English cricketer (b. 1752)
- August 13 – René Laennec, French physician (b. 1781)
- August 15 – Hanne Tott, Danish circus artist, manager (b. 1771)
- August 28 – Józef Zajączek, Polish general, politician (b. 1752)
- September 7 – Robert Wright (politician), American politician (b. 1752)
- September 12 – Eliphalet Pearson, American educator (b. 1752)
- October 8 – Marie-Guillemine Benoist, French painter (b. 1768)
- October 25 – Philippe Pinel, French physician (b. 1745)
- November 17 – Caroline Müller, Danish opera singer (b. 1755)
- November 23 – Johann Elert Bode, German astronomer (b. 1747)
- December 3 – Levin August von Bennigsen German general (b. 1745)
- December 11 – Queen-Empress Maria Leopoldina, consort of Pedro IV of Portugal & I of Brazil (b. 1797)
