= Blenheim Unionist rally =

Unionist political rally in 1912

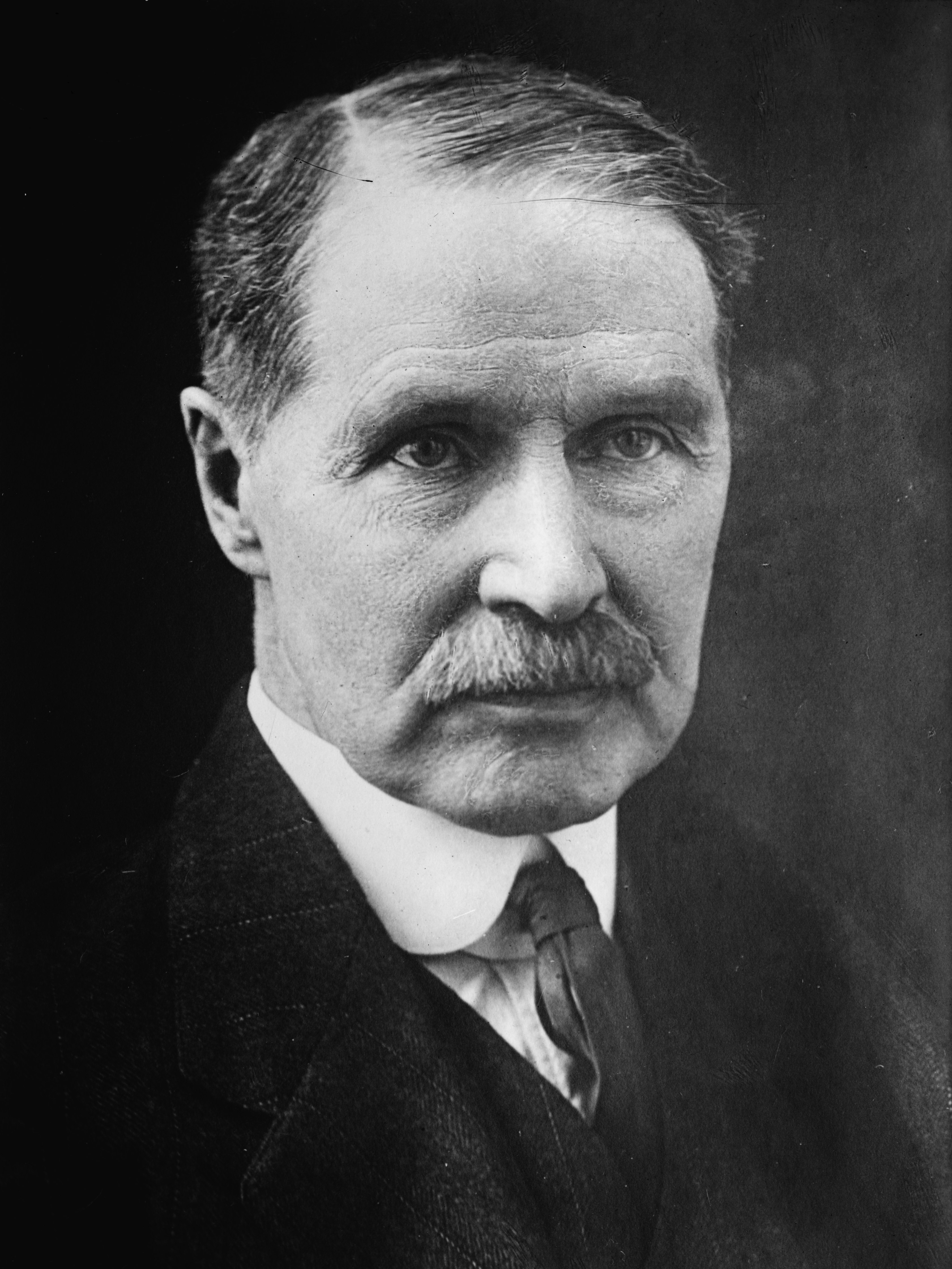
Bonar Law, Leader of the Opposition in 1912 and the most senior speaker at the Blenheim Unionist rally that year

The Blenheim Unionist rally was a major Unionist demonstration held on 27 July 1912 at Blenheim Palace, Oxfordshire, to protest against Irish Home Rule. The event was most notable as being the occasion on which Andrew Bonar Law, the leading Conservative statesman, first implied his support for forcible resistance against home rule in Ireland.

The meeting of leading Unionist politicians from Great Britain and Ireland, including over 40 peers, was hosted by the Duke of Marlborough at the Palace, and coincided with a mass political rally attended by several thousand loyalists. It was organised in response to a speech made by Prime Minister H. H. Asquith in Dublin earlier in the month, during which Asquith had ridiculed Unionist demands for a referendum on home rule through holding a general election. A contemporary account by The Spectator estimated the crowd as being ten and fifteen thousand people, who gathered in the Palace's courtyard to hear speeches. A New York Times article estimated the crowd to be twenty thousand. Unionists travelled from across the country to attend, with many arriving at Blenheim and Woodstock railway station.

Speakers at the rally included Bonar Law, the Duke of Marlborough, Edward Carson and F.E. Smith. The most enthusiastically received speech was given by Bonar Law, who stated:

"I said so to the Liberals and I say now, with a full sense of the responsibility which attaches to my position, that if the attempt be made under present conditions I can imagine no length of resistance to which Ulster will go in which I shall not be ready to support them, and in which they will not be supported by the overwhelming majority of the British people."

This marked the first occasion on which a leading British politician had issued an effective call-to-arms against Irish home rule. Law added that if Asquith continued with the Home Rule bill, the government would be "lighting the fires of civil war". In a separate speech, F.E. Smith urged Carson to appeal to "the young men of England" to fight for the unionists in Ulster. Other attendees included the leading Unionist peers the Duke of Norfolk, the Marquess of Londonderry and Viscount Midleton. During the rally, news arrived of Ernest Craig’s Conservative victory in the 1912 Crewe by-election which had taken place the previous day; the news was greeted with cheers by the demonstrators.
