= George Latham =

George Latham may refer to:

- George Latham (footballer) (1881–1939), Welsh professional footballer and coach
- George Latham (architect) (1793–1871), English architect
- George R. Latham (1832–1917), American politician and lawyer from Virginia and West Virginia
- George William Latham (1827–1886), MP for Crewe, 1885–1886
