= Michael Childers =

British Army officer

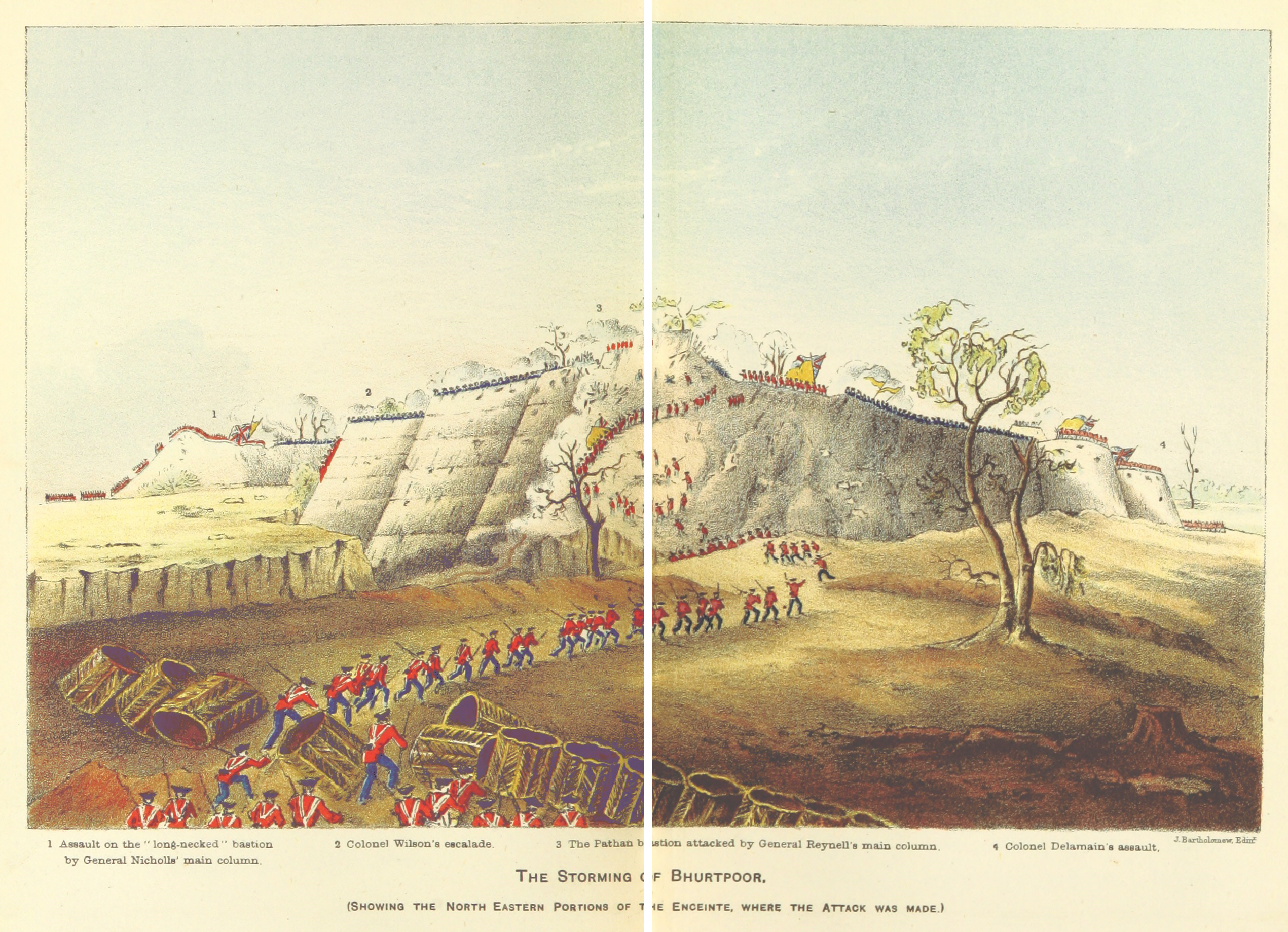
- Michael Childers in the Siege of Bharatpur
- Born: 17 December 1783; Cantley Hall, South Yorkshire, England
- Died: 9 January 1854 (aged 70) Sand Hutton, North Yorkshire, England
- Allegiance: British Empire: East India Company
- Service years: 1799–1853
- Rank: Lieutenant-colonel
- Conflicts: Peninsular War: Battle of El Bodón; Battle of Morales; Combat of Castrejón; Battle of Salamanca; Battle of Venta; Battle of Vitoria; Battle of Tolosa; Battle of Bayonne; Battle of Waterloo; Anglo–Indian Wars: Siege of Bharatpur
- Awards: Army Gold Medal; Army of India Medal

Colonel Michael Childers CB (17 December 1783 – 9 January 1854) was a British Army officer who served in the Peninsular War (1807–1814) and was present at the 1815 Battle of Waterloo.

== Life ==
Childers was born at Cantley Hall near Doncaster, the eldest son by the second marriage of Childers Walbanke-Childers, who had assumed the latter name when he inherited the estates of his grandfather, Leonard Childers, of Carr House, Yorkshire. His great nephew, Hugh Childers would become First Lord of the Admiralty and Chancellor of the Exchequer.

He joined the 2nd West India Regiment as an ensign on 25 February 1799 before transferring to the 11th Light Dragoons as a cornet on 5 August in the same year. On 25 August 1801 he was promoted to Lieutenant; to Captain on 14 June 1805; to brevet Major on 25 August 1814 and to brevet Lieutenant-colonel on 18 June 1815, the day of the Battle of Waterloo on the orders of the Prince Regent for his conduct during the battle. He became a major in the 60th Regiment of Foot on 15 April 1819 before transferring back to the 11th Light Dragoons in the same rank on 24 June 1819. He was promoted to Lieutenant-colonel on 21 September 1820 and to brevet Colonel on 10 January 1837.

During the Peninsular War, Childers was present at the battles of El Bodón (September 1811), Morales (June 1813), the Combat of Castrejón (July 1812), the Battle of Salamanca (July 1812), the Battle of Venta del Pozo (October 1812) and the battles of Vitoria (June 1813, Tolosa (June 1813) and Bayonne.

In his journal of the war, fellow cavalry officer William Tomkinson wrote:

Captain Childers of the 11th was the officer who particularly exerted himself, to which the safety of the detachment is to be considerably ascribed. He charged bodies three times their number, rode at then with the greatest determination, and always succeeded."

At Waterloo, he was Brigade Major to Major-general John Ormsby Vandeleur, commander of the 4th British Brigade.

Between 1823 and 1836, Childers served in India and was present at the Siege of Bhurtpore where he commanded the cavalry and for which he received the Army of India Medal.

He died unmarried in the village of Sand Hutton, North Yorkshire, on 9 January 1854. His life is commemorated by a stone tablet in St Mary's Church where he is buried.
