= India General Service Medal =

The India General Service Medal can refer to any one of five medals, each issued by the British government as campaign medals for military service in India, over the course of around 130 years:

- Army of India Medal (1803–1826)
- India General Service Medal (1854–95)
- India Medal (1895–1902)
- India General Service Medal (1908–1935)
- India General Service Medal (1936–39)

With the outbreak of the Second World War and Indian independence in 1947, no further medals in this series were issued.
