= Craig baronets =

Baronetcy in the Baronetage of the United Kingdom

There have been two baronetcies created for persons with the surname Craig, both in the Baronetage of the United Kingdom.

The Craig Baronetcy, of Craigavon, was created in the Baronetage of the United Kingdom on 5 February 1918. The title became extinct on the death of the 3rd baronet on 31 March 2025. For more information on this creation, see the Viscount Craigavon.

The Craig Baronetcy, of Alsager in the County of Chester, was created in the Baronetage of the United Kingdom on 1 July 1927 for Ernest Craig, Conservative Member of Parliament for Crewe from 1912 to 1918 and 1924 to 1929. The title became extinct on his death in 1933.

== Craig baronets, of Craigavon (1918) ==
- see the Viscount Craigavon

== Craig baronets, of Alsager (1927) ==
- Sir Ernest Craig, 1st Baronet (1859–1933)

== See also ==
- Gibson-Craig-Carmichael baronets
