= Robert Ward (British politician) =

Ward in 1895.

Captain The Honourable Robert Arthur Ward, OBE (23 February 1871 – 14 June 1942), was a British soldier and Conservative politician.

== Biography ==
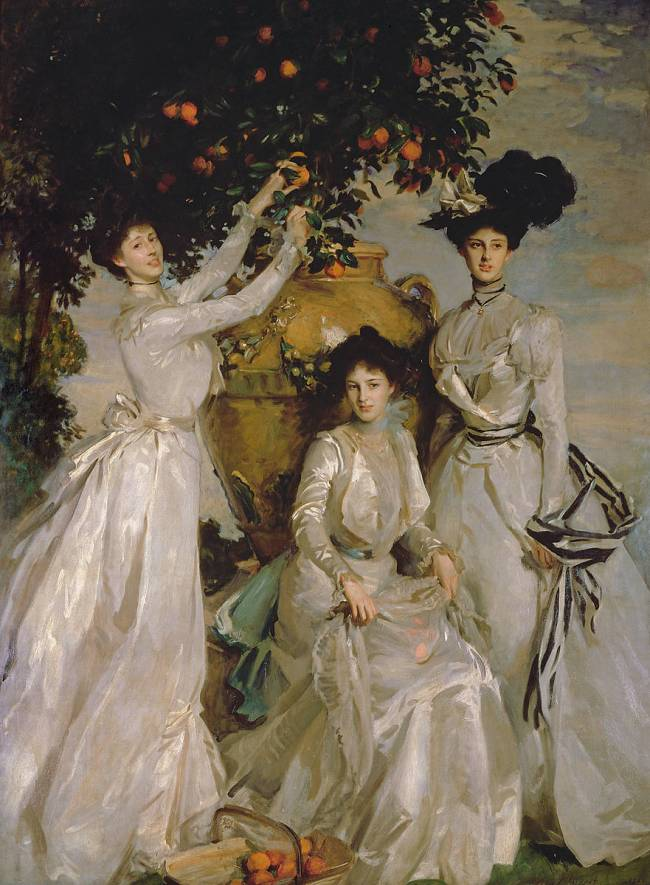
The Acheson Sisters (Ladies Alexandra, Mary and Theo Acheson), John Singer Sargent, 1902

Ward was the third son of William Ward, 1st Earl of Dudley, and his second wife Georgina Elisabeth, daughter of Sir Thomas Moncreiffe, 7th Baronet. William Ward, 2nd Earl of Dudley, was his elder brother. He was returned to Parliament for Crewe in the 1895 general election, a seat he held until 1900.

Ward fought in the Matabeleland campaign of 1896. He served with the 4th Battalion, Imperial Yeomanry, in the Second Boer War from early 1900 until he resigned his commission 5 March 1902, when he was appointed a second lieutenant of the Worcestershire Yeomanry (The Queen's Own Worcestershire Hussars). He later served in the First World War, where he was twice mentioned in despatches. In 1919 he was appointed an Officer of the Order of the British Empire (OBE).

Ward married Lady Mary Acheson, daughter of Archibald Acheson, 4th Earl of Gosford and his wife Lady Louisa Montagu, in 1906. He died in June 1942, aged 71.

Parliament of the United Kingdom
Preceded by Walter McLaren	Member of Parliament for Crewe; 1895–1900	Succeeded by James Tomkinson
