= Donald Somervell, Baron Somervell of Harrow =

British barrister, judge and Conservative Party politician

The Right Honourable The Lord Somervell of Harrow OBE PC
- Somervell in 1945 by Walter Stoneman

Lord of Appeal in Ordinary
- In office 4 October 1954 – 6 January 1960
- Preceded by: The Lord Asquith of Bishopstone
- Succeeded by: The Lord Morris of Borth-y-Gest

Home Secretary
- In office 25 May 1945 – 26 July 1945
- Prime Minister: Winston Churchill
- Preceded by: Herbert Morrison
- Succeeded by: James Chuter Ede

Attorney General for England and Wales
- In office 18 March 1936 – 25 May 1945
- Prime Minister: Stanley Baldwin; Neville Chamberlain; Winston Churchill
- Preceded by: Sir Thomas Inskipp
- Succeeded by: Sir David Maxwell Fyfe

Solicitor General for England and Wales
- In office 29 September 1933 – 19 March 1936
- Prime Minister: Ramsay MacDonald; Stanley Baldwin
- Preceded by: Sir Boyd Merriman
- Succeeded by: Sir Terence O'Connor

Personal details
- Born: 24 August 1889 Harrow on the Hill, London, England
- Died: 18 November 1960 (aged 71) Marylebone, London, England
- Party: Conservative
- Spouse: Loelia Helen Buchan-Hepburn (m. 1933; died 1945)
- Education: Magdalen College, Oxford

Donald Bradley Somervell, Baron Somervell of Harrow, OBE PC (24 August 1889 – 18 November 1960) was a British barrister, judge and Conservative Party politician. He served as Solicitor General and Attorney General from 1933 to 1945 and was briefly Home Secretary in Winston Churchill's 1945 caretaker government.

== Background, education and legal career ==
Somervell was the son of Robert Somervell, master and bursar of Harrow School. His father taught English to Winston Churchill. He was educated at Harrow before reading chemistry with a demyship at Magdalen College, Oxford, graduating with a First in 1911. In 1912 he was elected a prize fellow of All Souls College, Oxford, the first chemist to be elected. He then joined the Inner Temple, but his legal training was interrupted by the outbreak of the First World War. Commissioned into the British Army, he served with the Middlesex Regiment and the 53rd Brigade in India and Mesopotamia. For his war service, he was appointed OBE in 1919.

Having been called to the bar in absentia in 1916, he completed his pupillage and practiced in the chambers of William Jowitt, specialising in commercial law matters arising out of the Treaty of Versailles. He became King's Counsel in 1929.

== Political career ==
In 1929 he entered politics. Although supporting the Liberal Party by inclination, its decline and his admiration for Prime Minister Stanley Baldwin led him to join the Conservative Party. He stood unsuccessfully for Crewe in the 1929 general election. He won the seat in the 1931 election and held it for 14 years.

In 1933, he became Solicitor General, receiving the customary knighthood, followed three years later by a promotion to Attorney General. In the latter post, he served for nine years during which he oversaw crises such as the Abdication Crisis of Edward VIII. He was the longest-serving Attorney General since 1754. He was sworn of the Privy Council in the 1938 Birthday Honours. He was Recorder of Kingston upon Thames from 1940 to 1946.

In 1945, he was briefly Home Secretary in Winston Churchill's caretaker government. Both the government and Somervell were defeated in that year's general election.

== Judicial career ==
In 1946, Somervell was made a Lord Justice of Appeal by Clement Attlee. In 1951 Churchill returned to power but passed over Somervell's claims to the Lord Chancellorship. On 4 October 1954 Somervell became a Lord of Appeal in Ordinary and, as a Law Lord, he received a life peerage as Baron Somervell of Harrow, of Ewelme in the County of Oxford. He retired in 1960, shortly before his death.

== Family ==
Somervell married Loelia Helen Buchan-Hepburn, daughter of Sir Archibald Buchan-Hepburn, 4th Baronet, in 1933. She died in July 1945, aged 48. Somervell survived her by fifteen years and died in November 1960, aged 71. His grave can be found in the grounds of Saint Mary's Church in Ewelme, opposite that of the writer Jerome K. Jerome.

== Arms ==
Coat of arms of Donald Somervell, Baron Somervell of Harrow
Coronet Coronet of a baron Crest A Wheel Or upon it a Dragon Vert spouting Flames proper Escutcheon Azure three Lozenges in fess Or each charged with a Mullet of the field accompanied by seven Cross Crosslets of the second four in chief and three in base all within a Bordure Ermine for difference Supporters On either side a Wyvern Vert spouting Flames proper charged on the shoulder with a Wheel Or Orders Order of the British Empire

Parliament of the United Kingdom
Preceded by John William Bowen	Member of Parliament for Crewe; 1931–1945	Succeeded by Scholefield Allen
Legal offices
Preceded by Sir Boyd Merriman	Solicitor General for England and Wales; 1933–1936	Succeeded by Sir Terence O'Connor
Preceded by Sir Thomas Inskip	Attorney General for England and Wales; 1936–1945	Succeeded by Sir David Maxwell Fyfe
Political offices
Preceded by Herbert Morrison	Home Secretary; 1945	Succeeded by Chuter Ede
