= Scholefield Allen =

British politician (1898-1974)

- Allen in May 1949.

Member of Parliament for Crewe
- In office 5 July 1945 – 8 February 1974
- Preceded by: Donald Somervell
- Succeeded by: Gwyneth Dunwoody

Personal details
- Born: Sydney Scholefield Allen; 3 February 1882 Birkenhead, Cheshire, England
- Died: 26 March 1974 (aged 76)
- Party: Labour
- Spouse: Mona Irving
- Children: 2
- Education: Liverpool University

Military service
- Allegiance: United Kingdom
- Branch/service: British Army
- Unit: Royal Artillery
- Battles/wars: First World War

Sydney Scholefield Allen QC (3 January 1898 – 26 March 1974) was a British barrister and Labour Party politician.

Born in Birkenhead to Joseph Allen and his wife Edith (née Scholefield), he was educated at Birkenhead Institute and Liverpool University, from where he graduated with first class honours in law.

He served with the Royal Artillery during the First World War, and subsequently was called to the Bar at Gray's Inn.

Practising in criminal law, his most famous brief was the sensational 1931 Liverpool murder case, acting as junior counsel for William Herbert Wallace, assisting Roland Oliver KC, who led for the Defence. Wallace was initially convicted of the bizarre murder of his wife Julia, and sentenced to death, but in a unique legal decision the verdict was quashed on Appeal, because the weight of the evidence did not support it, and Wallace was freed. Scholefield Allen was appointed a King's Counsel in June 1945. He served as Recorder of Blackburn between 1947 and 1970.

He was elected as Member of Parliament (MP) for Crewe at the 1945 general election, defeating the Conservative Home Secretary, Sir Donald Somervell, and held the seat until he retired at the February 1974 general election, a month before his death. His successor as MP was Gwyneth Dunwoody. He was married to Mona (née Irving) and they had two sons, John (advisor to Harold Wilson) and David.

Parliament of the United Kingdom
| Preceded by Donald Somervell | Member of Parliament for Crewe; 1945 – February 1974 | Succeeded by Gwyneth Dunwoody |
