= 1910 Crewe by-election =

UK Parliamentary by-election

The 1910 Crewe by-election was held on 30 April 1910. The by-election was held due to the death of the incumbent Liberal MP, James Tomkinson. It was contested by the Liberal candidate Walter McLaren and the Unionist Liverpool ship-owner J.H. Welsford. The Liberal candidate retained the seat.

Crewe by-election, 1910
Party	Candidate	Votes	%	±%
Liberal	Walter McLaren	7,639	55.8	+2.5
Unionist	James Hugh Welsford	6,041	44.2	+7.0
Majority		1,598	11.6	−4.5
Turnout		13,680	86.2	−5.6
Liberal hold		Swing	-2.2	
