= Burma Medal =

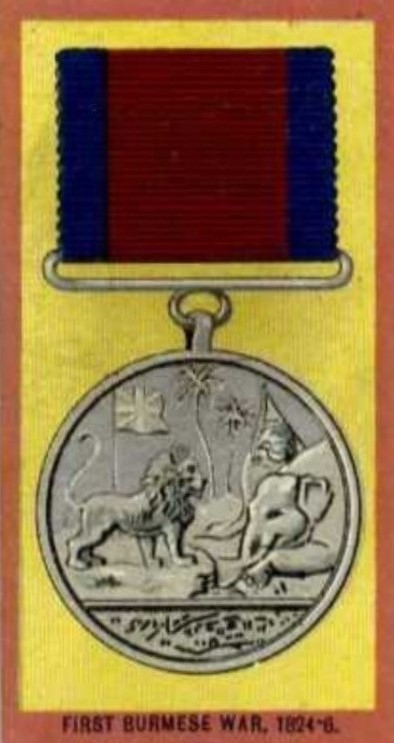
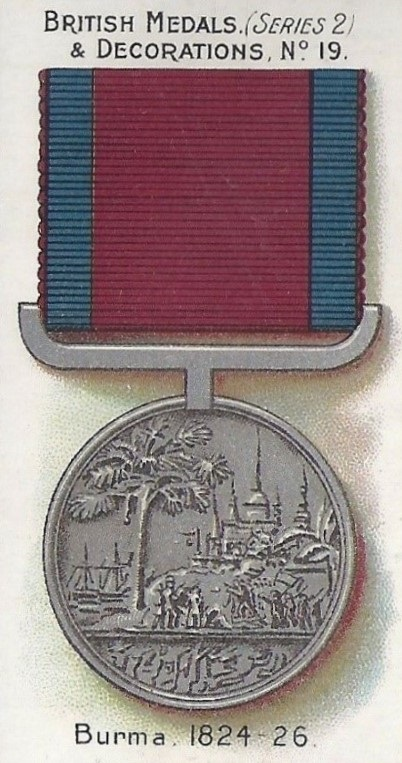
- Obverse and reverse of the medal, depicted on cigarette cards
- Type: Campaign medal
- Awarded for: Campaign service
- Presented by: the Honourable East India Company (HEIC)
- Eligibility: HEIC forces
- Campaign(s): First Burma War
- Clasps: None
- Established: 1826
- Total: 750 gold and 24,000 silver medals
- Ribbon: crimson with dark blue edges

The Burma Medal is a campaign medal awarded by the Governor-General of India to native Indian soldiers of the armies of the Honourable East India Company (HEIC) who participated in the First Burma War from April 1824 to February 1826.

== Criteria ==
The War was fought between the British HEIC and the Kingdom of Burma, primarily over Burmese incursions into north east India. The war ended in February 1826 with the Treaty of Yandabo, in which Burma ceded territory to the HEIC, paid a large indemnity and agreed to sign a commercial treaty.

The medal was authorised by Lord Amherst, the Governor-General of India, in April 1826. It was awarded to HEIC forces only, to native Indian officers and officials in gold (about 750 awarded) and to native other ranks in silver (about 24,000 awarded). The only European to receive the medal, in gold, was General Sir Archibald Campbell who commanded the British and Indian forces during the campaign. The medal was limited to those involved in the actual fighting, it also being awarded posthumously – to the heirs of those who had died.

Europeans who took part, including officers in HEIC service and members of the British Army and Royal Navy, were not eligible for the medal. However, surviving British officers, soldiers and sailors qualified for the Army of India Medal with clasp Ava, when this medal was established in 1851. As they had already received the Burma Medal, native Indians did not receive the Army of India Medal for the campaign.

== Description ==
The medal was struck at the Calcutta Mint in gold and in silver. Both types were 1.5 inches (38 mm) in diameter with the following design:
The obverse, designed by William Daniell RA, depicts the elephant of Burma crouching in submission to the victorious British lion, while behind the Burmese standard is lowered before the Union Flag, there being palm trees behind. In the exergue is the Persian inscription The Elephant of Ava is obedient to the Lion of England, year 1826.
The reverse, designed by William Wyon, depicts the storming of the Shwedagon Pagoda in Rangoon. To the left is the Irrawaddy Flotilla, with the British commander General Campbell directing the attack from under a palm tree. In the exergue is the Persian inscription A medal for the victorious British soldiers of Ava.
No clasps were authorised and the medal was issued unnamed.
The suspension was either a ring attached to the medal by way of a steel clip, or by a straight bar attached to a steel claw.

The medal was worn on the left chest, suspended from a 1.5 inches (38 mm) wide ribbon of crimson with dark blue edges. This was the British 'military ribbon' previously used for the Army Gold Medal and Cross, the Waterloo Medal and later the Military General Service Medal. The Burma Medal was the first HEIC campaign medal to be issued with a distinct ribbon, earlier medals having been worn around the neck, most by a cord.
