= Gwyneth Dunwoody =

British politician (1930–2008)

The Honourable Gwyneth Dunwoody
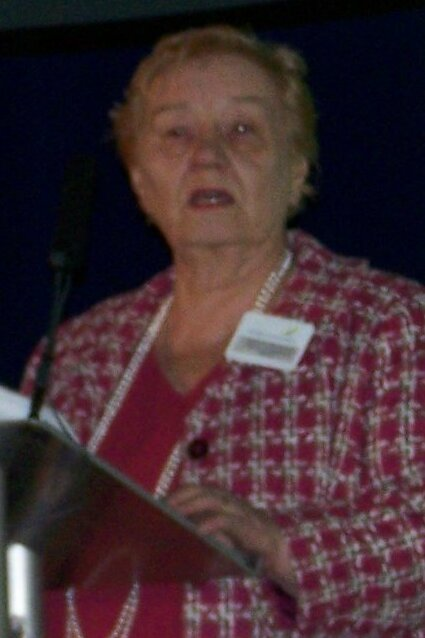
- Dunwoody in 2008

Member of Parliament for Crewe and Nantwich Crewe (1974–1983)
- In office 28 February 1974 – 17 April 2008
- Preceded by: Scholefield Allen
- Succeeded by: Edward Timpson

Chair of the Transport Committee (Note: Environment, Transport and Regional Affairs from 1997 to 2001.)
- In office 16 July 1997 – 17 April 2008
- Preceded by: Paul Channon
- Succeeded by: Louise Ellman

Member of the European Parliament for the United Kingdom
- In office 1 July 1975 – 7 June 1979

Parliamentary Secretary to the Board of Trade
- In office 29 August 1967 – 24 June 1970
- Prime Minister: Harold Wilson
- Preceded by: The Lord Walston
- Succeeded by: Anthony Grant

Member of Parliament for Exeter
- In office 31 March 1966 – 29 May 1970
- Preceded by: Rolf Dudley-Williams
- Succeeded by: John Hannam
Shadow portfolios
Shadow Cabinet
| 1984–1985 | Transport |
| 1983–1984 | Without Portfolio |
| 1980–1983 | Health |
Shadow Frontbench
| 1980–1980 | Foreign Affairs |

Personal details
- Born: Gwyneth Patricia Phillips; 12 December 1930 Fulham, London, England
- Died: 17 April 2008 (aged 77) John Radcliffe Hospital, Oxford, England
- Party: Labour
- Spouse: John Dunwoody (m. 1954; div. 1975)
- Children: 3, including Tamsin
- Parents: Morgan Phillips; Norah Phillips

Gwyneth Patricia Dunwoody (née Phillips; 12 December 1930 – 17 April 2008) was a British Labour Party politician, who was a Member of Parliament (MP) for Exeter from 1966 to 1970, and then for Crewe (later Crewe and Nantwich) from February 1974 until her death in 2008. She was a moderate socialist and had a reputation as an independent parliamentarian, described as ‘intelligent, obstinate, opinionated and hard-working’.

== Early and private life ==
Dunwoody was born in Fulham, London, where her father was Labour parliamentary agent. She belonged to an experienced political dynasty: her father, Welsh-born Morgan Phillips, was a former coalminer who served as General Secretary of the Labour Party between 1944 and 1962; her mother, Norah Phillips was a former member of London County Council who became a life peer in 1964 (allowing Dunwoody to be styled "The Honourable"), serving as a government whip in the House of Lords, and as Lord Lieutenant of Greater London from 1978 to 1986. Both of her grandmothers were suffragettes, and all four grandparents were Labour party loyalists.

She attended the Fulham County Secondary School for Girls, now the Fulham Cross Girls' School, and the Notre Dame Convent (a girls' grammar school) in Battersea. She left school aged 16, and became a journalist with a local newspaper in Fulham, covering births, marriages and deaths. She joined the Labour Party in 1947, and spoke at the 1948 Labour party conference in Scarborough. She worked as an actress in repertory and as a journalist in the Netherlands, learning fluent Dutch, before suffering a bout of tuberculosis.

=== Married life ===
She married John Dunwoody in 1954, the same year he qualified as a doctor. Her husband became a general practitioner based in Totnes in Devon. They had two sons and a daughter. Their daughter, Tamsin Dunwoody, was a member of the National Assembly for Wales for one term between 2003 and 2007 and from 2005 was Deputy Minister for Enterprise, Innovation and Networks in the Welsh Assembly Government.

Her husband stood as Labour candidate in the safe Conservative seat of Tiverton in 1959, and came close to winning Plymouth Sutton in 1964, losing by just 410 votes (David Owen would later hold for several years for Labour).

Meanwhile, Dunwoody was a councillor on Totnes Borough Council (now South Hams) from 1963 to 1966. Her husband was finally elected as Labour MP for Falmouth and Camborne in 1966 (she was elected at the same time in Exeter). He served as a Parliamentary Under-Secretary at the Department of Health and Social Security from 1969 until 1970. A well-regarded orator at the Labour Party Conference, John Dunwoody was spoken of as a future leader of the Party but lost his seat in the 1970 general election and did not return to Parliament. They were divorced in 1975.

== Parliamentary career ==
Dunwoody stood as the Labour Party candidate for the Exeter seat in the 1964 general election. She was elected as Member of Parliament for Exeter in 1966, emulating her husband in Falmouth and Camborne. Like her husband, she also served as a junior minister, as a Parliamentary secretary at the Board of Trade, and also lost her seat at the 1970 general election.

In 1969 whilst serving as Parliamentary secretary to the board of trade she presented rock band Led Zeppelin with gold discs in recognition of the group exporting £5 million of records to the USA (£111,000,000 in 2024)

From 1970 to 1975, she was Director of the Film Producers Association of Great Britain and Consultant to the Association of Independent Cinemas.

She returned to the House of Commons after the February 1974 general election, becoming MP for the safe Labour seat of Crewe, having received the sponsorship of the National Union of Railwaymen (later part of RMT). Dunwoody was also a Member of the European Parliament between 1975 and 1979 (alongside John Prescott) at a time when MEPs were nominated by national parliaments — MEPs have been directly elected since 1979.

In 1983, Dunwoody stood for election as Deputy Leader of the Labour Party, alongside Peter Shore, on a Eurosceptic platform (a position she consistently maintained throughout her career - she voted against the Maastricht Treaty seven times). The position was won by Roy Hattersley, and Dunwoody came last out of the four candidates with 1.3% of the Electoral College.

She did not return to ministerial office, but served as a front bench spokesman on, by turns, transport, health, and foreign affairs during the 18 years of Labour opposition from 1979 to 1997. She also served on the Labour National Executive Committee for seven years, from 1981 to 1988, collaborating closely with Betty Boothroyd. She resisted the Militant group in her constituency and later opposed all-women shortlists.

In 1983, boundary changes abolished the constituency of Crewe and created the constituency of Crewe and Nantwich, with many Conservative voters from Nantwich included in the new seat. She narrowly won the election in 1983 by 290 votes. She remained MP at Crewe and Nantwich until her death in 2008, having benefited from a further redrawing of the boundaries in 1997 which increased her majority substantially.

In 1998, she gained headlines around the world when she clashed with New York City Mayor Rudolph Giuliani urging the return of the original Winnie the Pooh dolls from Donnell Library Center to the British Museum after stating that she ‘detected sadness’ in their display behind bulletproof glass.

In October 2000, she was one of several candidates for the speakership of the House of Commons. The election was won by Michael Martin MP.

As a member for a constituency with a strong connection with the railway industry, she had expertise on transport matters, and was Chair of the House of Commons' Transport Committee from 1997 to 2008. In this role she was a critic of the government, and she and her committee discomfited witnesses from the rail and air transport industries.

An attempt by the government whips to remove her and Donald Anderson, Chair of the Foreign Affairs Select Committee, from their positions after the 2001 general election led to a revolt by back-bench members of Parliament, which resulted in them both being reinstated.

She was President of Labour Friends of Israel from 1988 to 1993, and was a parliamentary consultant to the British Fur Federation. She was one of 13 Labour MPs to vote against a reduction of the age of consent for homosexual acts to 16.

She had a house in her constituency, and a flat in the Barbican. She suffered from financial problems in the late 1980s, with a house in her constituency being repossessed due to mortgage arrears, was threatened with eviction from her London flat, and had furniture seized by bailiffs to meet rent arrears. She was sued by Barclays Bank due to an unpaid loan.

The Daily Telegraph described her as "Clever, acerbic, fiercely independent and often just plain funny", noting her willingness to cast party allegiance aside.

== Death ==
Dunwoody died during the evening of 17 April 2008 in John Radcliffe Hospital, Oxford, following emergency heart surgery. Her funeral was held at St Margaret's, Westminster on 8 May 2008. She is buried at North Sheen Cemetery.

Her former husband died in 2006. She was survived by her daughter and two sons.

Her daughter Tamsin Dunwoody was selected as the Labour Party candidate in the by-election for Crewe and Nantwich. The by-election was announced by chief party whip Geoff Hoon on Wednesday 30 April 2008 and was held on Thursday 22 May 2008. Dunwoody lost the by-election and the Conservative candidate, Edward Timpson, became her mother's successor.

== Records ==
In late September 2007, Dunwoody beat Irene Ward's record of the longest total service for a woman MP, at 37 years, 9 months. In early December 2007, she beat Barbara Castle's record of the longest unbroken service for a woman MP, at 33 years, 9 months. These records have since been broken by Margaret Beckett and Harriet Harman respectively.

== Legacy ==
In January 2007, railway operator GB Railfreight named locomotive 66719 Gwyneth Dunwoody. Dunwoody Way in Crewe is named after Gwyneth Dunwoody.

== Notes ==
Parliament of the United Kingdom
| Preceded by Sir Rolf Dudley-Williams | Member of Parliament for Exeter; 1966–1970 | Succeeded by Sir John Hannam |
| Preceded by Scholefield Allen | Member of Parliament for Crewe; February 1974 – 1983 | Constituency abolished |
| New constituency | Member of Parliament for Crewe and Nantwich; 1983–2008 | Succeeded by Edward Timpson |
