= Walter McLaren =

British Liberal Party politician (1853–1912)

Walter Stowe Bright McLaren
- Walter McLaren MP, circa 1910

Member of Parliament for Crewe
- In office 1886–1895
- Preceded by: George William Latham
- Succeeded by: Robert Ward

Member of Parliament for Crewe
- In office April 1910 – 1912
- Preceded by: James Tomkinson
- Succeeded by: Ernest Craig

Personal details
- Born: 17 April 1853
- Died: 29 June 1912 (aged 59)
- Resting place: St Cuthberts Churchyard
- Party: Liberal
- Spouse: Eva Muller (m. 1883)
- Parents: Duncan McLaren (father); Priscilla Bright (mother)
- Relatives: John Bright (uncle); Jacob Bright (uncle); Margaret Bright Lucas (aunt); Charles McLaren (brother); John McLaren (half-brother); Agnes McLaren (half-sister); Helen McLaren (sister); Helen Bright Clark (cousin); Henrietta Müller (sister-in-law)

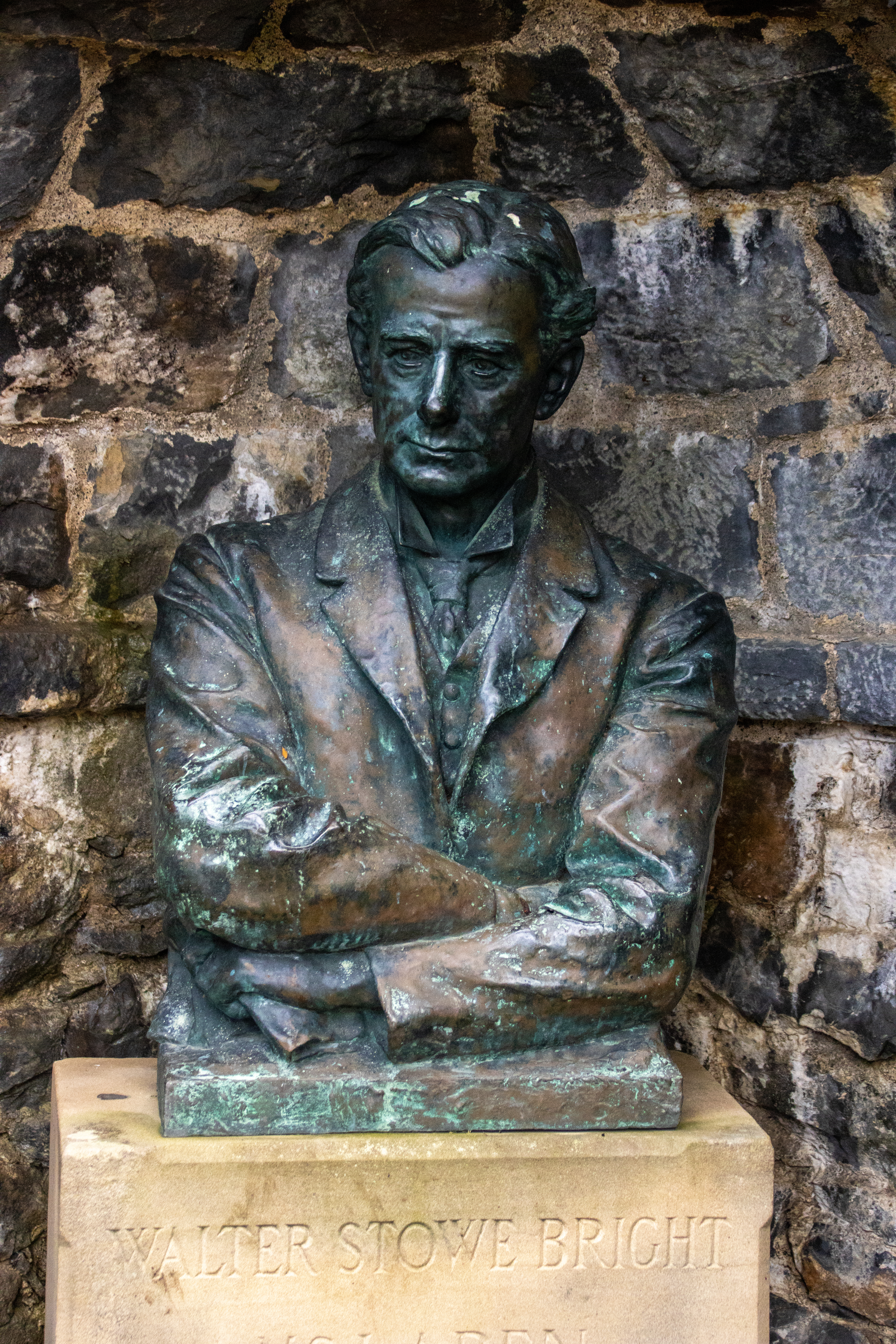
Bust of McLaren at Bodnant Garden

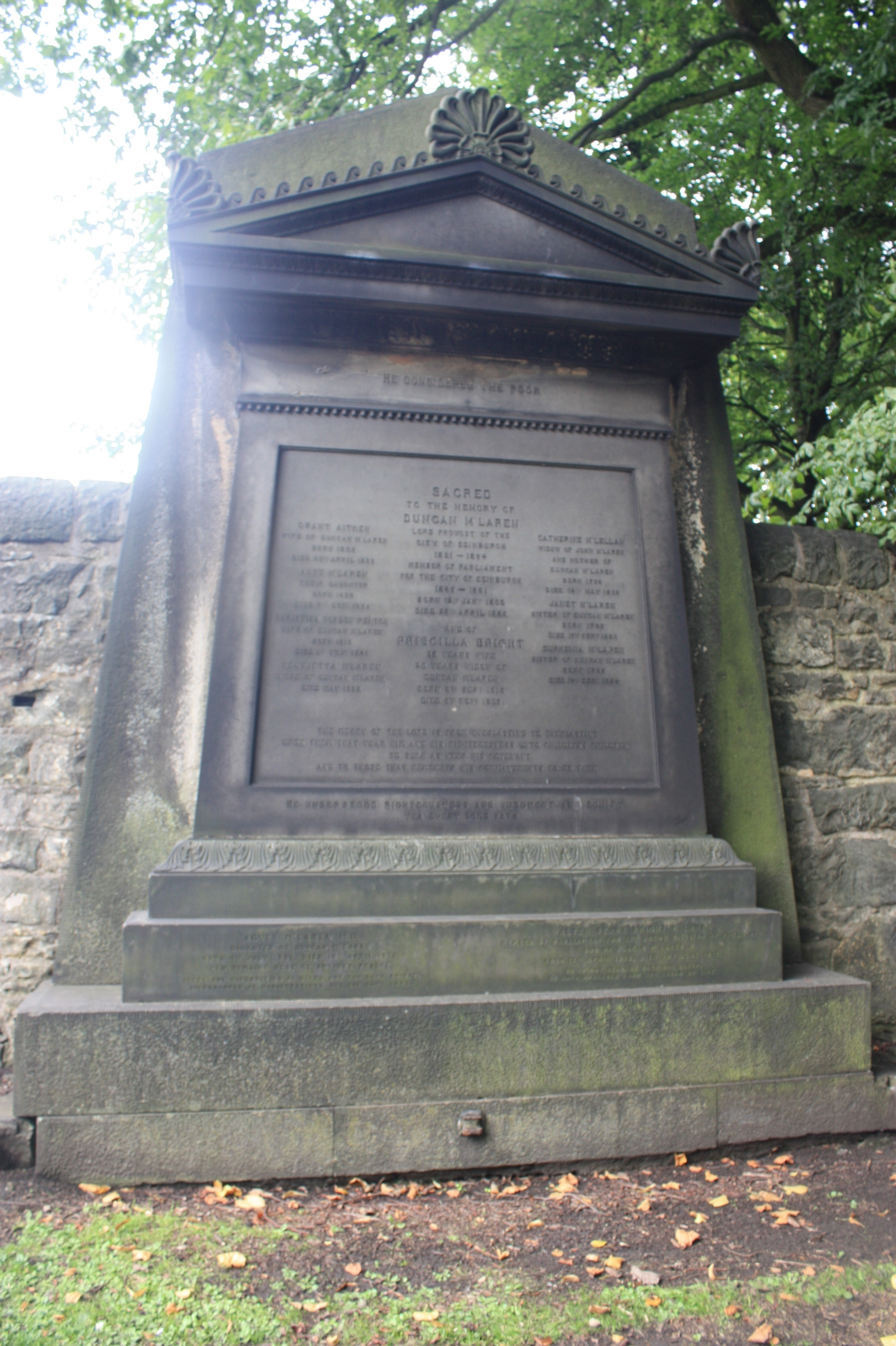
The McLaren monument, St Cuthberts, Edinburgh

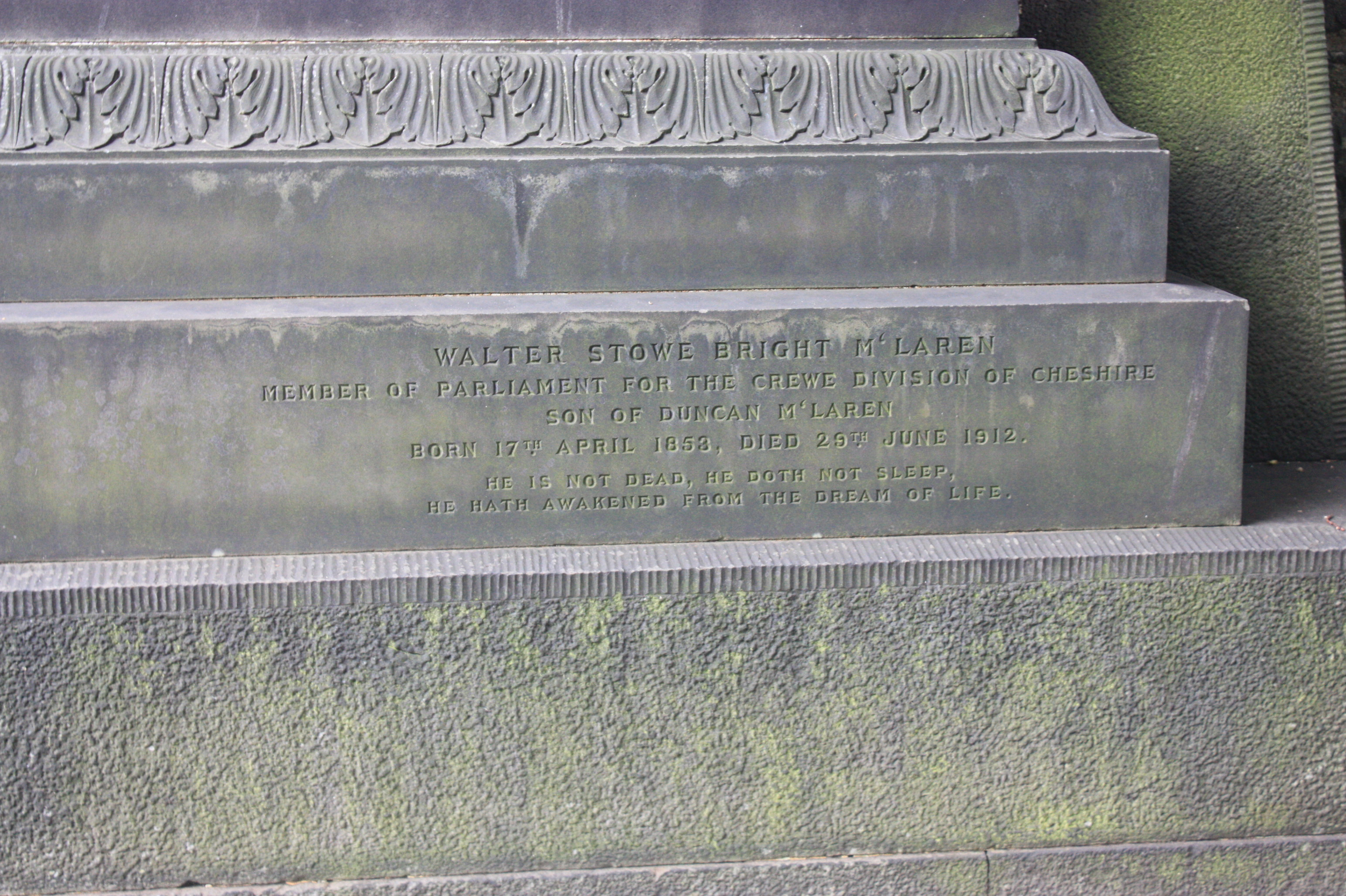
Footnote to Walter Stowe Bright McLaren, St Cuthberts

Walter Stowe Bright McLaren (17 April 1853 – 29 June 1912) was a British Liberal Party politician who was Member of Parliament (MP) for the Crewe division of Cheshire for a total of 11 years between 1886 and 1912.

He was the youngest child of the Liberal MP Duncan McLaren (1800–1886) and his third wife Priscilla Bright, a sister of the Radical MP John Bright. Two of his brothers, Charles McLaren, 1st Baron Aberconway and John also became Liberal Members of Parliament. Walter McLaren was married in April 1883 to Eva Muller. They became a powerful pair of women's rights advocates with Eva calling herself Mrs Eva McLaren and not the expected Mrs Walter McLaren. Eva stood successfully for public office as far as it was permitted at the time. She campaigned for further rights as treasurer of the Society for Promoting the Return of Women as County Councillors and Walter served on its successor organisation the Women's Local Government Society. Walter introduced a clause to the Local Government Act 1894 which extended the voting rights of married women.

McLaren first stood for election to the House of Commons at the 1885 general election, when he stood as an "independent liberal" candidate for the Inverness district of Burghs, in Scotland. He had been nominated by the Free Church Constitutional Party, and polled strongly against the official Liberal Party candidate, taking 47.5% of the votes.

At the 1886 general election he was elected in Crewe, where the sitting Liberal MP George Latham had not sought re-election. McLaren was re-elected in 1892, but lost his seat at the 1895 general election. He did not stand in 1900, when the seat was regained for the Liberals by James Tomkinson, but when Tomkinson died shortly after being re-elected at the January 1910 election, McLaren was the successful Liberal candidate in the resulting by-election. He held the seat until his own death in 1912, aged 59.

Walter is buried with his parents in St Cuthberts Churchyard in Edinburgh. Although the monument, lying on the east wall of the first south section under Edinburgh Castle, is huge, Walter is relegated to a simple footnote at the base of the stone.

Parliament of the United Kingdom
Preceded by George William Latham	Member of Parliament for Crewe; 1886–1895	Succeeded by Robert Ward
Preceded by James Tomkinson	Member of Parliament for Crewe; April 1910 – 1912	Succeeded by Ernest Craig
