= 1912 Crewe by-election =

UK parliamentary by-election

← Dec. 1910	26 July 1912	1918 →

Candidate	Craig	Murphy	Holmes
Party	Unionist	Liberal	Labour
Popular vote	6,260	5,294	2,485
Percentage	44.6%	37.7%	17.7%
MP before election
Walter McLaren
Liberal
Subsequent MP
Joseph Davies
Liberal

The 1912 Crewe by-election was a Parliamentary by-election held on 26 July 1912. The constituency returned one Member of Parliament (MP) to the House of Commons of the United Kingdom, elected by the first past the post voting system.

== Vacancy ==
Walter McLaren had been Liberal MP for the seat of Crewe since the April 1910 By-Election. In 1912, he died causing the vacancy.

== History ==
McLaren

General election December 1910
Party	Candidate	Votes	%	±%
Liberal	Walter McLaren	7,629	56.3	+0.5
Liberal Unionist	Ernest Craig	5,925	43.7	−0.5
Majority		1,704	12.6	+1.0
Turnout		13,554	85.4	−0.8
Liberal hold		Swing	+0.5	

The Liberal Party had won every election in Crewe, since the seat was created in 1885 apart from the 1895 election, when a Conservative won.

== Candidates ==
The Liberal candidate was 30-year-old Harold Lawson Murphy, a lecturer in Political Economy in Trinity College Dublin. He had trained as a solicitor and was secretary to the Liberal Cabinet Minister, Sir John Simon.

The Unionist candidate was Ernest Craig, who had been the unsuccessful Liberal Unionist candidate here in December 1910.

The Labour Party, who had not fielded a candidate in December 1910 having fielded a candidate in January 1910, decided to re-enter the contest. Their candidate was James Holmes who was a member of the Amalgamated Society of Railway Servants.

Given the intervention of the Labour Party, the result of the previous three-way contest is relevant;

General election January 1910
Party	Candidate	Votes	%	±%
Liberal	James Tomkinson	7,761	53.3	−6.3
Liberal Unionist	John Lane Harrington	5,419	37.2	−3.2
Labour	Frank Herbert Rose	1,380	9.5	New
Majority		2,342	16.1	−3.1
Turnout		14,560	91.8	+4.7
Liberal hold		Swing	-1.6	

== Result ==
Crewe by-election, 1912
Party	Candidate	Votes	%	±%
Unionist	Ernest Craig	6,260	44.6	+0.9
Liberal	Harold Lawson Murphy	5,294	37.7	−18.6
Labour	James Holmes	2,485	17.7	New
Majority		966	6.9	N/A
Turnout		14,039	88.1	+2.7
Unionist gain from Liberal		Swing	+9.8	

The intervention of the Labour candidate took enough votes from the Liberal candidate to help the Unionist candidate win.

== Aftermath ==
A General Election was due to take place by the end of 1915. By the autumn of 1914, the following candidates had been adopted to contest that election;

- Unionist: Ernest Craig
- Liberal: Joseph Davies

Following the by-election the Labour Party decided to re-adopt Holmes as their prospective parliamentary candidate. The National Union of Railwaymen agreed to be his sponsor. However Holmes was concerned that another election where the progressive vote was split would result in another Unionist victory. He called for the Labour and Liberal parties to come to some sort of electoral arrangement as had been the practice in the past. In response, the Labour Party decided to drop him as prospective candidate. Due to the outbreak of war, the election never took place. Joseph Davies, who had been adopted as Liberal candidate back in 1913 was a supporter of David Lloyd George and in 1918 was granted the 'Coalition Coupon'. As a result, Ernest Craig withdrew and did not defend the seat he had won 6 years earlier.

Davies

General election 1918: Crewe
Party	Candidate	Votes	%	±%
Liberal	Joseph Davies	13,392	56.2	+18.5
Labour	James Thomas Brownlie	10,439	43.8	+26.1
Majority		2,953	12.4	N/A
Turnout		23,831	68.4	−19.7
Liberal gain from Unionist		Swing	-3.8	
