= Siege of Bharatpur (1825–1826) =

British victory in India

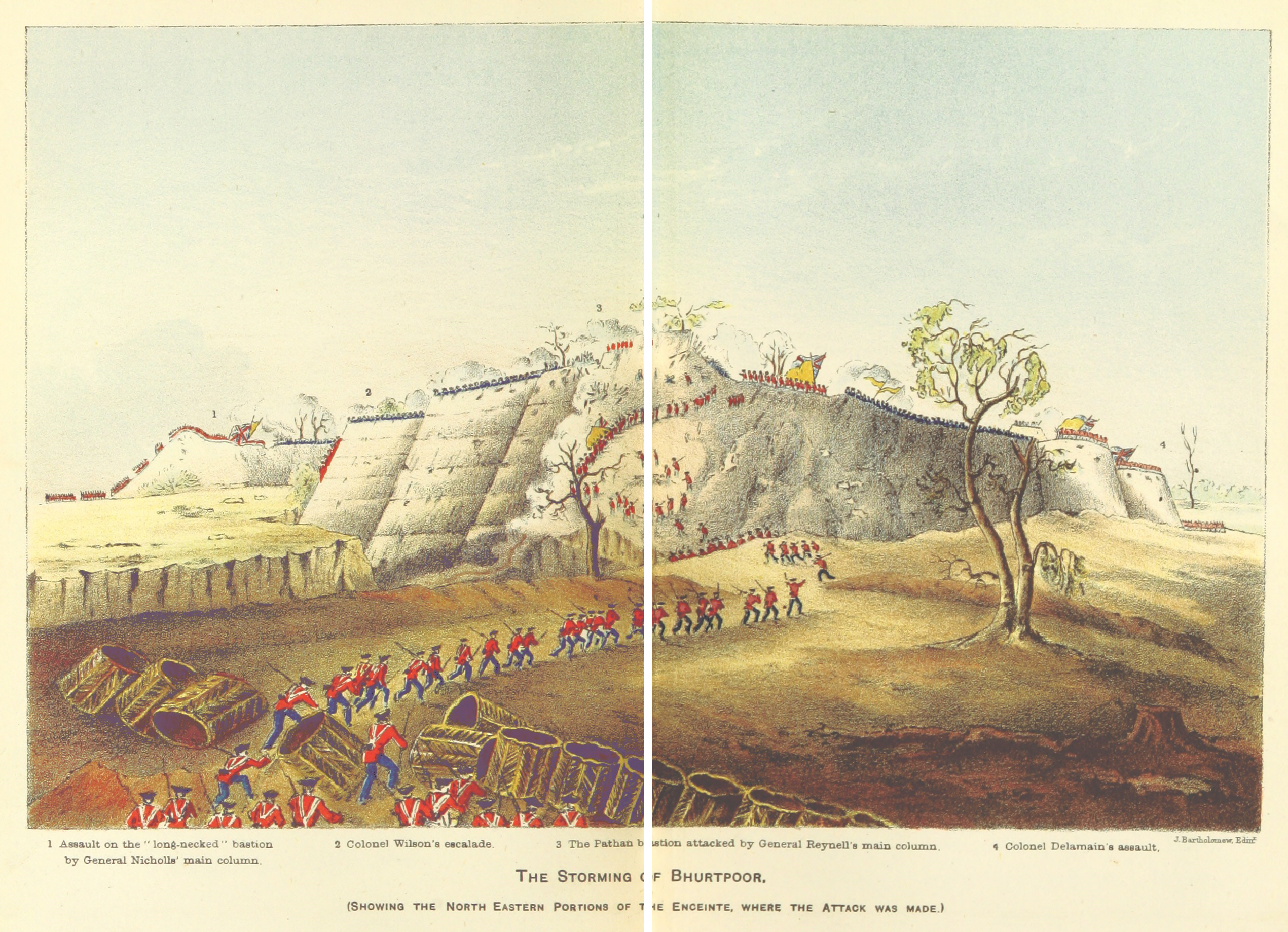
- An illustration of the siege
Date	9 December 1825 – 18 January 1826
Location	Bharatpur, Rajasthan 27.2199°N 77.4954°E
Result	British victory

Belligerents
British Empire; East India Company	Bharatpur State

Commanders and leaders
Lord Combermere; Michael Childers	Balwant Singh of Bharatpur

Strength
27,000	25,000

Casualties and losses
1,050	19,000
- Location within Rajasthan Bharatpur (India)

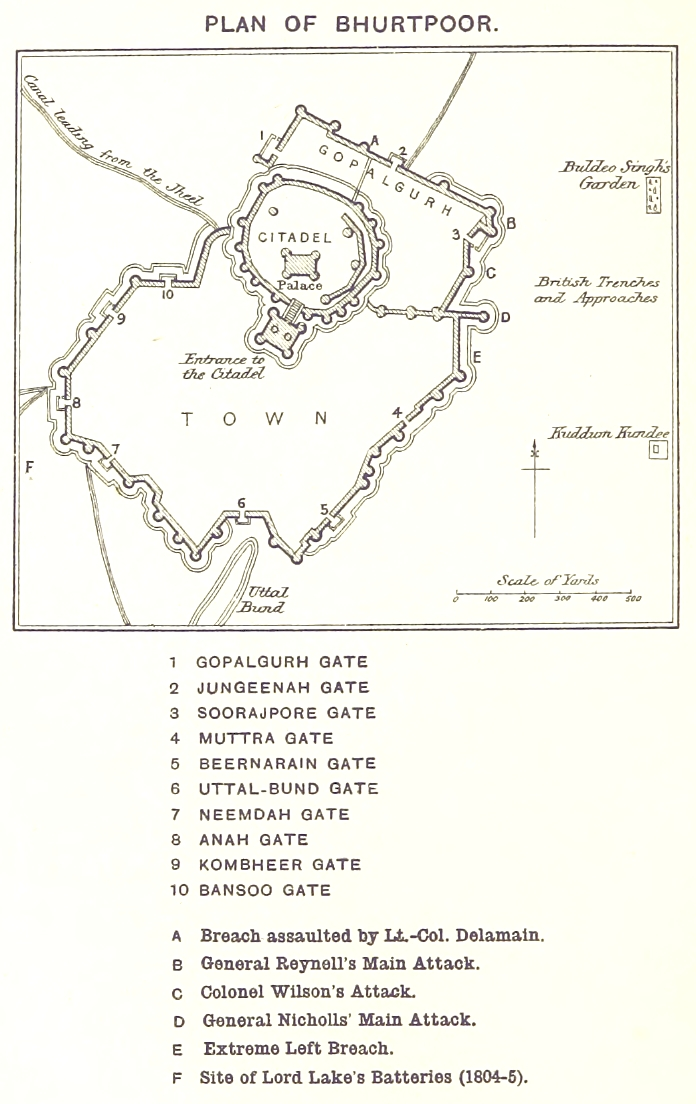
Plan of Bhurtpore

The siege of Bharatpur was a siege that took place in the Indian princely state of Bharatpur (now part of Rajasthan) between December 1825 and January 1826. British troops under Lord Combermere initially surrounded the state's capital until on 18 January 1826 its fortress was stormed and captured.

== Background ==
Since the Maratha sponsored victory at the Siege of Bharatpur in 1805, Bharatpur had remained beyond British control, a situation that unnerved the Court of Directors of the East India Company (EIC) in London. They met at the beginning of 1825 and sought the advice of the Duke of Wellington as to how Bharatpur could be taken. He recommended Lord Combermere for the task but was told that the Court did not consider Combermere a "a man of any great genius". "I don't care a damn about his genius," Wellington replied, "I tell you he's the man to take Bhurtpore." Accordingly, Combermere sailed to Calcutta aboard the EIC ship Thalia and after a prolonged voyage arrived on 2 October 1825. Meanwhile, the Maharaja of Bharatpore, Baldeo Singh died in suspicious circumstances to be succeeded by his son Balwant Singh, who was only five years of age but had been officially recognised by the Governor-General of India, Lord Amherst. Before his death Baldeo Singh had entrusted his son to the protection of distinguished General Sir David Ochterlony who, acting on his initiative as Civil Commissioner, advanced on Bharatpore with an army from the British garrison at Delhi. When Amherst heard of the move, he sent peremptory orders to recall the troops, whereupon Ochterlony resigned. Amherst then appointed Combermere Commander-in-Chief.

== Siege ==
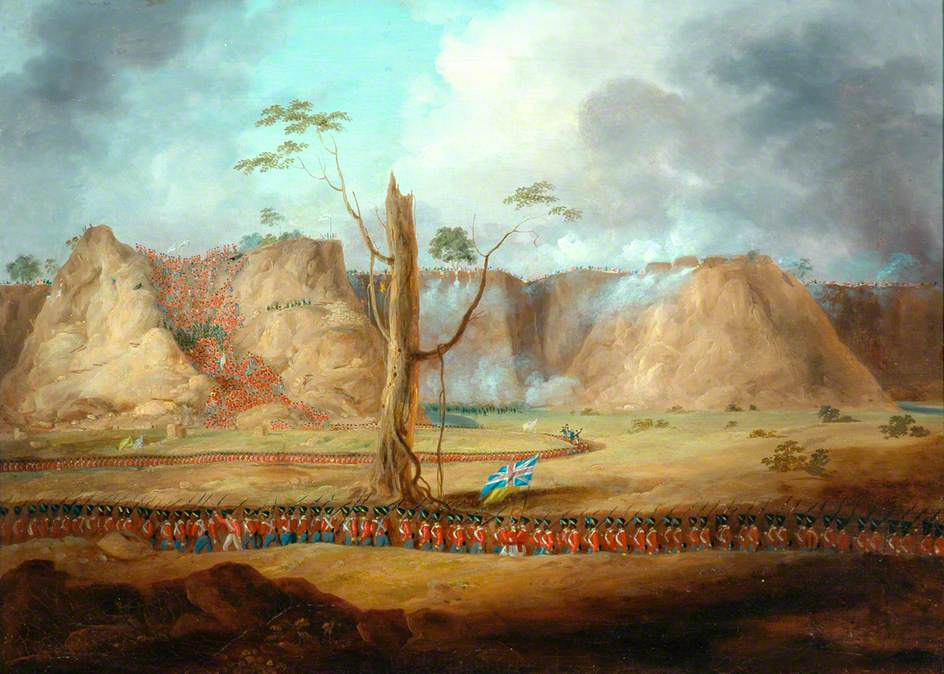
The Storming of Bhurtpore, 1826

Combermere's army was made up of two divisions of infantry, one division of regular cavalry, a brigade of irregular horse, a large train of battering ordnance, several brigades of field artillery (horse and foot), along with a corps of engineers, sappers and other requisite troops. The fortress at Bharatpur had been erected by the Jat rulers of Bharatpur and enhanced over the years. By the time Combermere arrived it was 8 miles (13 km) in circumference and surrounded by 35 clay and horse dung semi-circular bastions, which had been baked rock-hard by the sun. The fortress was considered impervious to artillery while its defences were enhanced by a 150-foot (46 m) wide and 59-foot (18 m) deep dry moat, which could be filled by diverting water from a nearby lake. Combermere arrived in Agra on 1 December 1825 and reached Bharatpore on the 10th. On arrival, troops were despatched to capture the reservoir to the north west of the fort to prevent the enemy flooding the area as they had done during the 1805 siege. By the middle of December the fort was surrounded by British forces with skirmishes occurring on a daily basis. The siege continued until the night of 18 January when two breaches were made and mines exploded so that within two hours the fort had been stormed and taken.

== Aftermath ==
Following his success at Bharatpur, Lord Combermere was raised in the peerage as Viscount Combermere on 8 February 1827. When the prize money was divided following the siege, the officers present gave the sum of £1,000 to the widows of each of the four European officers killed, and £1,000 to be divided amongst the widows and orphans of the European soldiers killed.

For many years the 17.75-ton Bhurtpore gun, captured during the siege stood outside the Royal Artillery Barracks in Woolwich, London. It is now in the care of the Royal Artillery Museum at Larkhill, Wiltshire.
