= Jacob Hamburger =

German rabbi and author (1826–1911)

Rabbi Jacob Hamburger

Personal life
- Born: November 10, 1826
- Died: October 23, 1911 (aged 84)
- Occupation: rabbi

Religious life
- Religion: Judaism

Jacob Hamburger (November 10, 1826 – October 23, 1911) was a German rabbi and author.

== Biography ==
Hamburger was born at Loslau, Silesia, on November 10, 1826. He received his early education in Ratibor, and then attended the yeshivot of Hotzenplotz, Presburg, and Nikolsburg, and the University of Breslau. In 1852, he was called as rabbi to Neustadt bei Pinne, and in 1859 went to Mecklenburg-Strelitz as "Landesrabbiner". In addition to various articles and sermons, he published "Geist der Hagada, Sammlung Hagadischer Aussprüche aus den Talmudim und Midraschim," Leipzig, 1859. This work, published by the Institut zur Förderung der Israelitischen Literatur, was intended as the first of a series, but was never continued. It may be regarded as the forerunner of the Jewish encyclopedia which he began to publish in 1862, under the title "Realencyclopädie des Judenthums," of which three volumes appeared. The first part contains Biblical articles, the second Talmudic articles, and the third being supplementary. A second edition appeared in Leipzig in 1896.

Hamburger died at Strelitz-Alt on October 23, 1911.
