= George William Latham =

English landowner, barrister and Liberal politician

George William Latham (4 May 1827 – 4 October 1886) was an English landowner and barrister and a Liberal politician.

Latham was born in London, the son of John Latham (1787–1853) of Bradwall Hall, Sandbach, and his wife, Elizabeth Anne Dampier, daughter of Sir Henry Dampier, a judge of the King's Bench. He was educated at Brasenose College, Oxford (BA 1849, MA. 1852) and was called to the bar at Inner Temple in 1852. He was a J.P. for Cheshire and the Borough of Crewe.

Three times Latham stood unsuccessfully as a Liberal for the division of Mid Cheshire: in 1863, in 1880 and in 1883. He was elected Member of Parliament for Crewe but did not defend the seat at the 1886 general election. He died shortly after at the age of 59.

Latham married Elizabeth Sarah Luttman-Johnson in 1856 and they lived at Bradwall Hall, Sandbach, Cheshire.

Parliament of the United Kingdom
New constituency see Mid Cheshire; East Cheshire; West Cheshire	Member of Parliament for Crewe; 1885–1886	Succeeded by Walter McLaren
