= Army of India Medal =

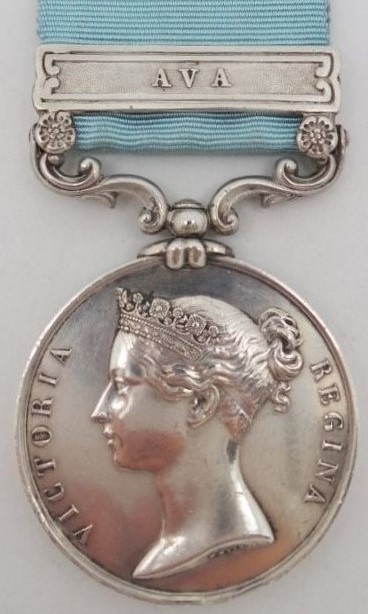
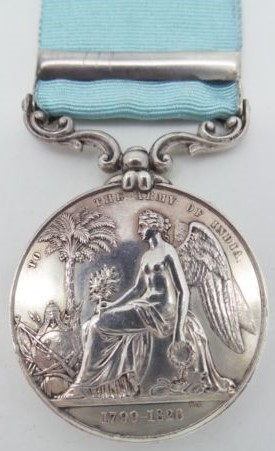
- Obverse and reverse of the medal.
- Type: Campaign medal
- Awarded for: Campaign service.
- Description: Silver disk, 36mm diameter.
- Presented by: United Kingdom of Great Britain and Ireland
- Eligibility: British and Honourable East India Company forces.
- Campaign: India 1803–26.
- Clasps: 21 authorised.
- Established: 21 March 1851
- Total: 4,500
- Ribbon: pale blue.

The Army of India Medal (AIM) was a campaign medal approved in 1851 for issue to officers and men of the British Army and the Army of the Honourable East India Company. A retrospective award following the precedent set by the Naval General Service Medal and the Military General Service Medal, it served to reward service in various actions from 1803 to 1826.

== Criteria ==
The Army of India Medal was approved on 21 March 1851 as a retrospective award by the Honourable East India Company, who bore the cost of the medal, to survivors of various actions during the period 1803–1826. This period encompassed four wars: the Second Mahratta War (1803–04), the Gurkha War (1814–16), the Pindaree or Third Mahratta War (1817–18), and the First Burmese War (1824–26), together with the siege of Bhurtpoor (1825–26). Each battle or action covered by the medal was represented by a clasp on the ribbon and twenty-one were sanctioned. While the maximum awarded to one man was seven, most medals were awarded with a single clasp.

The medal was only awarded to survivors and, as such, there are substantially fewer medals issued when compared with the number of men who served during this period. This was largely due to the extreme lapse of time between the wars commemorated and the issue of the medal—forty-eight years had passed between the first battle commemorated —Allighur in 1803—and the date of issue, 1851. A total of 4,500 medals were awarded.

While the medal was awarded to both British and Indian soldiers on the same basis, the clasp Ava was only awarded to Europeans, since the Honourable East India Company had already awarded a medal for this Burma campaign to all native Indian soldiers present.

== Appearance ==
The medal is circular, made of silver, and 1.4 inches (36 mm) in diameter. It was designed by William Wyon.
The obverse bears an effigy of a young Queen Victoria wearing a diadem. On either side of the effigy is the inscription VICTORIA and REGINA.
The reverse bears and an allegorical representation of Victory holding a laurel branch in her right hand and a wreath in her left. In the foreground is a lotus flower, with a palm tree and trophy of arms in the background. Above is the inscription TO THE ARMY OF INDIA, below in the exergue 1799-1826..
British recipients had their name and unit impressed on the rim of the medal in block Roman capitals. Medals to Indians – which were named locally – had a number of different impressed and engraved styles.
The pale blue ribbon is 1.25 inches (32 mm) wide.

== Clasps ==
The following clasps were issued, they reading downwards from the top of the medal:

Second Mahratta War:
- Allighur (4 September 1803)
- Battle of Delhi (11 September 1803)
- Assaye (23 September 1803)
- Asseerghur (21 October 1803)
- Laswarree (1 November 1803)
- Argaum (29 November 1803)
- Gawilghur (15 December 1803)
- Defence of Delhi (8-14 December 1803)
- Battle of Deig (13 November 1804)
- Capture of Deig (11-23 December 1804)

Gurkha War:

- Nepaul (October 1814 - March 1816)

Third Mahratta War:

- Kirkee (5 November 1817)
- Poona (11-16 November 1817)
- Khadki and Poona (5-16 November 1817)
- Seetabuldee (26-27 November 1817)
- Nagpore (16 December 1817)
- Seetabuldee and Nagpore (26-27 November, 16 December 1817)
- Maheidpoor (21 December 1817)
- Corygaum (1 January 1818)

First Burmese War:

- Ava (April 1824 - February 1826)

Siege of Bhurtpoor:

- Bhurtpoor (17-18 January 1826)

== Bibliography ==
- Joslin; Litherland; Simpkin (1988). British Battles and Medals (6th ed.). London: Spink. ISBN 0-907605-25-7.
- Mayo, John Horsley (1897). Medals and Decorations of the British Army and Navy, Volume 2. London: A. Constable.
- Mussell, John, ed. (2014). Medal Yearbook 2015. Honiton, Devon: Token Publishing Ltd (published 20 September 2014). p. 177. ISBN 978-1-908828-17-0.
