= Baldeo Singh =

Maharaja of Bharatpur from 1823 to 1825

- Maharaja of Bharatpur
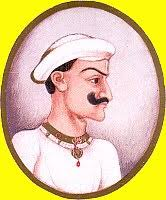
- Portrait of Maharaja Baldeo Singh
- Reign: 1823 – 1825
- Predecessor: Randhir Singh
- Successor: Balwant Singh
- Issue: Balwant Singh
- House: Sinsiniwar Jat Dynasty
- Religion: Hinduism

Baldeo Singh (Hindi: महाराजा बलदेव सिंह) was ruling Maharaja of the princely state of Bharatpur (1823–1825) and the successor of Randhir Singh after his death in 1823. Randhir Singh had no son and, as per rule, his brother Baldeo Singh ascended the throne after his death in 1823. He was succeeded by his five-year-old son Balwant Singh.
