= James Tomkinson =

British politician (1840–1910)

James Tomkinson MP, circa 1910

James Tomkinson PC (1840 – 10 April 1910) was an English landowner and Liberal politician.

== Life ==
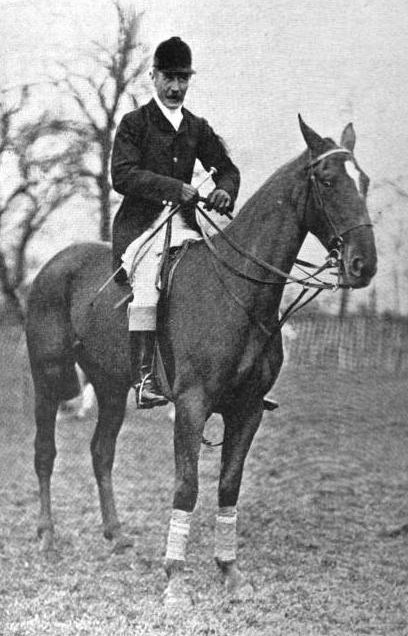
Tomkinson at the House of Commons Steeplechase in a photograph taken shortly before his death from a fall.

Born in 1840, Tomkinson lived at Willington Hall, Chester. He was the son of Waterloo veteran Lieutenant-Colonel William Tomkinson and Susan, daughter of Thomas Tarleton of Bolesworth Castle, Cheshire and a descendent of Sir Roland Egerton, 1st Baronet.

He was High Sheriff of Cheshire in 1887. In 1895, he unsuccessfully contested Nuneaton for the Liberals, but at the 1900 general election he was elected as Member of Parliament (MP) for Crewe, holding the seat until his death in April 1910. He was appointed a deputy lieutenant of Cheshire in 1901, became Second Church Estates Commissioner in 1907, and member of the Privy Council in November 1909.

In 1871 Tomkinson married Emily Frances Palmer, a daughter of Sir George Palmer, 3rd Baronet, by his marriage to Emily Elizabeth Holford.

Tomkinson died on 10 April 1910 from injuries sustained in a fall while participating in the House of Commons Steeplechase.

== Descendants ==
- Charles William Tomkinson (1877–1939)
- James Edward Tomkinson, later Palmer-Tomkinson (1879–1961)

- James Algernon Palmer-Tomkinson (1915–1952)

- Charles Palmer-Tomkinson (born 1940)

- James Palmer-Tomkinson
- Santa Palmer-Tomkinson, now Santa Montefiore (born 1970)
- Tara Palmer-Tomkinson (1971–2017)

- Christopher Palmer-Tomkinson (born 1942)
- Jeremy Palmer-Tomkinson (born 1943)

- Jane Lindsay Tomkinson, who in 1935 married Herbert Ingram, later Sir Herbert Ingram (1912–1980)
- Henry Archdale Tomkinson (1881–1937) (Brigadier Tomkinson), manager of the royal Racing and Breeding Studs

Parliament of the United Kingdom
Preceded by Robert Ward	Member of Parliament for Crewe; 1900–1910	Succeeded by Walter McLaren
Church of England titles
Preceded by Charles Hobhouse	Second Church Estates Commissioner; 1907–1910	Succeeded by Sir Charles Nicholson
Honorary titles
Preceded by Francis Dicken Brocklehurst	High Sheriff of Cheshire; 1887	Succeeded by Baron William Henry Von Schröder
