= William Tomkinson =

British Army officer (1790–1872)

Lieutenant colonel William Tomkinson
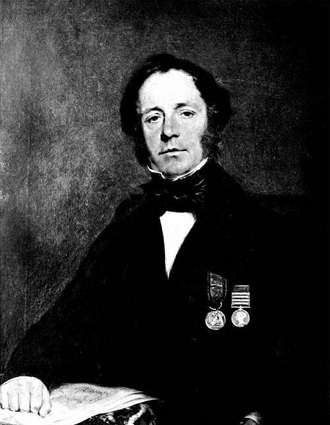
- Portrait of Tomkinson
- Born: 18 January 1790
- Died: 1872 (aged 81–82)
- Spouse: Susan Tarleton (m. 1836)
- Children: 6. including James Tomkinson

Lieutenant Colonel William Tomkinson (18 January 1790 – 1872) was a British Army officer who served in the Peninsular War and Waterloo campaign.

== Early life ==
The fourth son of Henry Tomkinson of Dorfold, Cheshire, his mother was Anne, daughter of John Darlington of Aston, Chester.

== Career ==
Tomkinson was gazetted to the 16th Light Dragoons as a cornet in December 1807, joining his regiment the following April. During the Peninsular War (1809-1813) he was seriously wounded at the crossing of the Douro on 11 May 1809 but recovered to see action at the battles of Busaco (1810), Redhina (1811), Fuentes de Oñoro (1811), El Bodón (1811), Salamanca (1812) and Vittoria (1813).

He was subsequently at Waterloo and remained in France with the Army of Occupation until December 1815.

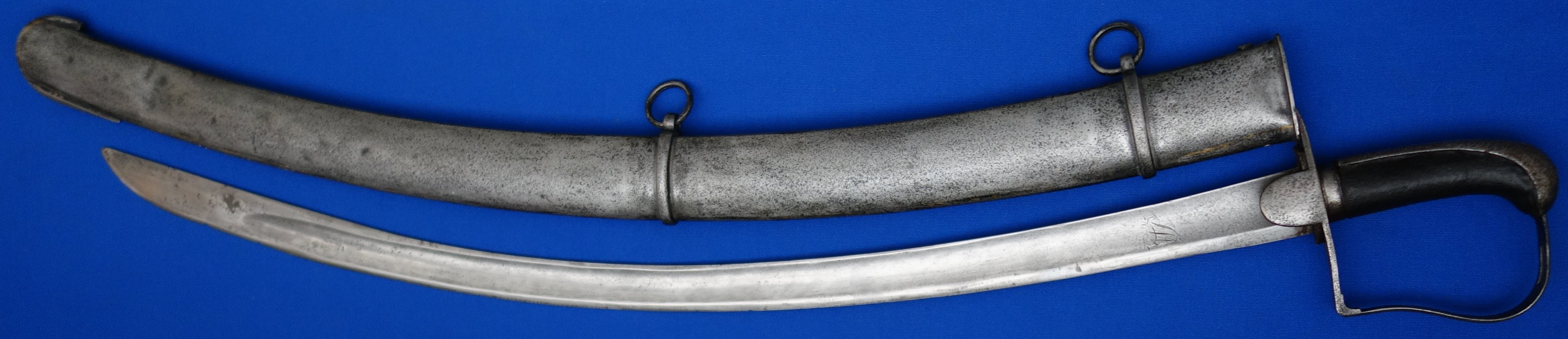
The battle damaged sabre of then Captain William Tomkinson, inscribed with his initials WT.

=== Retirement ===
Tomkinson retired on half-pay in 1821 and bought the land for Willington Hall, Cheshire, on the former estate of Lord Alvanley in 1827. In retirement he became a magistrate and huntsman.

== Family ==
In 1836 he married Susan, daughter of Thomas Tarleton of Bolesworth Castle, Cheshire. The couple had four sons and two daughters including James Tomkinson who became an M.P. and Henry, who joined the army and went on to command the 1st Royal Dragoons.
