= Ernest Craig =

British politician (1859-1933)

Sir Ernest Craig, 1st Baronet (1859 – 9 April 1933) was a British Conservative Party politician.

He was elected as Member of Parliament (MP) for the Crewe division of Cheshire at a by-election in July 1912 after the death of his Liberal predecessor, Walter McLaren. Craig did not stand for re-election in 1918, when the seat was won a Coalition Liberal, and his next candidacy was at the 1924 general election, when he won the seat in a straight contest with the sitting Labour Party MP Edward Hemmerde. He stepped down from the House of Commons at the 1929 general election.

In the 1927 Birthday Honours, he was made a baronet on 1 July 1927, of Alsager in Cheshire.

Ernest Craig, before becoming a politician, along with many other Englishmen went west to the US and to New Mexico in particular. He owned the Last Chance Mine in Mogollon, Grant County, New Mexico, and a picture survives of him in 1908 seated in a motor vehicle at Hudson Springs (now Faywood Hot Springs). He introduced innovative methods of extracting gold. He also established a horse and buggy transport for mining company property movement between Mogollon and Silver City. His only child, Ernestine, later acquired the Mimbres Hot Springs, a few miles from Faywood. Her son Craig Wheaton-Smith managed the Mimbres Hot Springs ranch, and her grandson Simon Wheaton-Smith (Ernest Craig's great-grandson) also resides in Silver City, New Mexico.

== Sources ==
- Craig, F. W. S. (1983) [First published 1969]. British parliamentary election results 1918–1949 (3rd ed.). Chichester: Parliamentary Research Services. p. 303. ISBN 0-900178-06-X.
- Craig, F. W. S. (1989) [First published 1974]. British parliamentary election results 1885–1918 (2nd ed.). Chichester: Parliamentary Research Services. p. 231. ISBN 0-900178-27-2.
- "House of Commons constituencies beginning with "C" (part 6)". Leigh Rayment's House of Commons pages. Archived from the original on 30 July 2018.

Parliament of the United Kingdom
Preceded by Walter McLaren	Member of Parliament for Crewe; 1912–1918	Succeeded by Joseph Davies
Preceded by Edward Hemmerde	Member of Parliament for Crewe; 1924–1929	Succeeded by John William Bowen
Baronetage of the United Kingdom
New creation	Baronet (of Alsager); 1927–1933	Extinct
