= Balwant Singh of Bharatpur =

Maharaja of Bharatpur from 1825 to 1853

Maharaja Balwant Singh
- Maharaja of Bharatpur
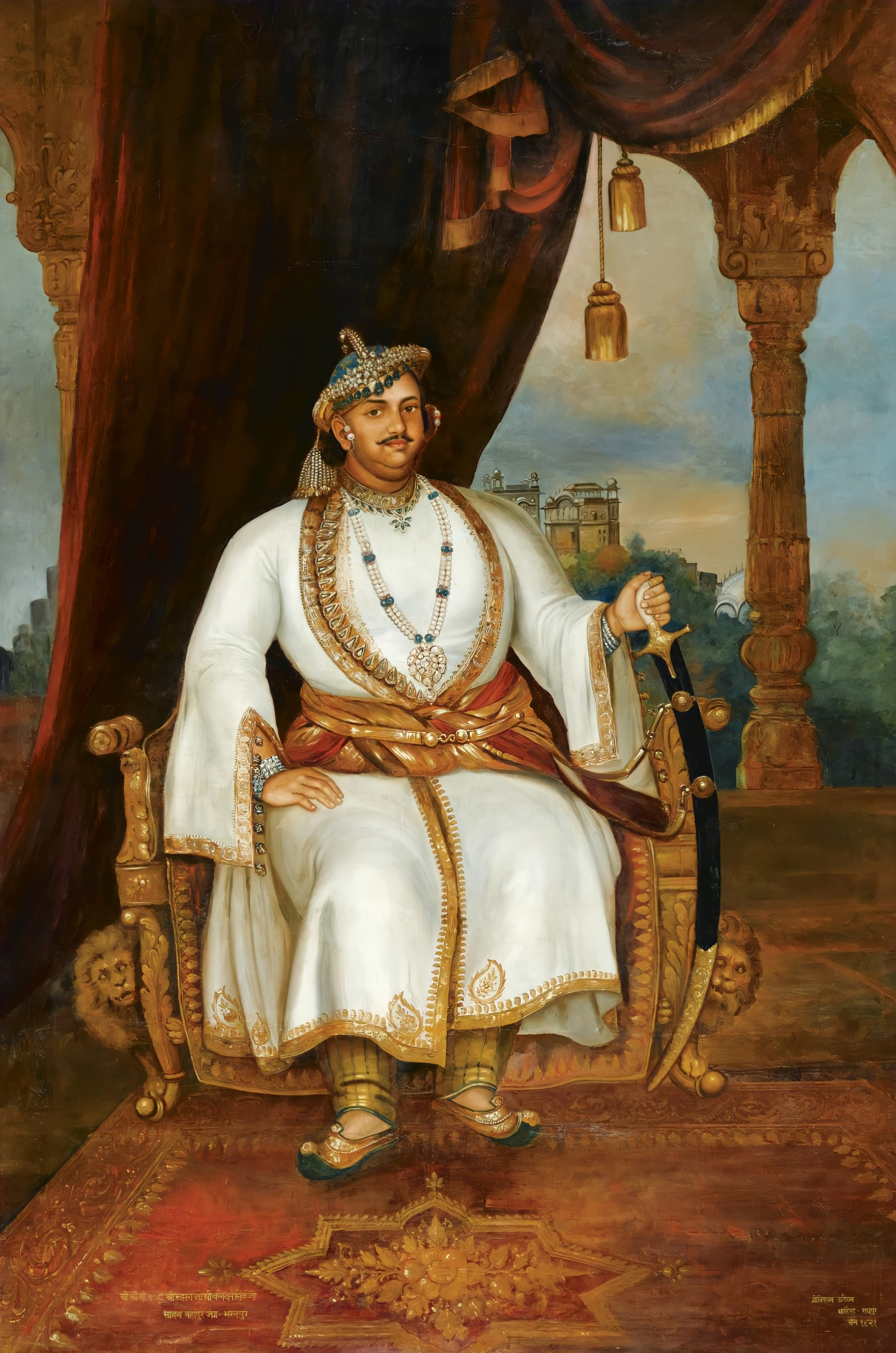
- Portrait of Maharaja Balwant Singh
- Reign: 26 February 1825 – 21 March 1853
- Predecessor: Baldeo Singh
- Successor: Jaswant Singh
- Born: 5 February 1820; Bharatpur
- Died: 21 March 1853 (aged 33); Bharatpur
- Issue: Jaswant Singh
- House: Sinsiniwar Jat Dynasty
- Father: Baldeo Singh
- Religion: Hinduism

Balwant Singh (1820–1853) was the ruler of the princely state of Bharatpur in India from 1825 till his death, and successor to Maharaja Baldeo Singh. He was in turn succeeded by Maharaja Jashwant Singh.

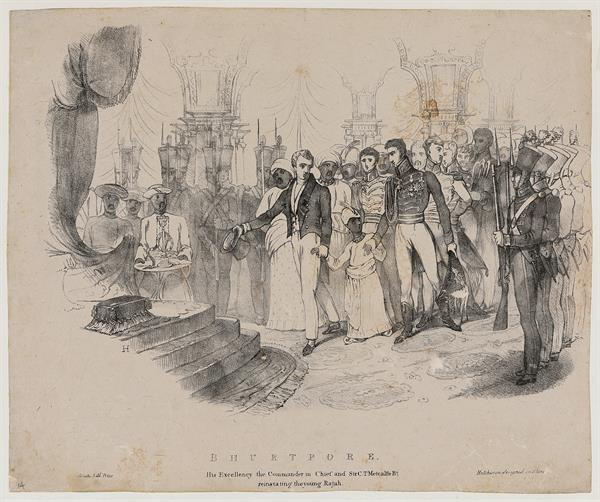
Sir C.T. Metcalfe Bt. and His Excellency the Commander in Chief Combermere reinstating the young Rajah. Bhurtpore 1826

Balwant Singh of Bharatpur Sinsiniwar Jat Dynasty Born: 5 February 1820 Died: 21 March 1853
Regnal titles
Preceded by Maharaja Baldeo Singh	Maharaja of Bharatpur; 1825–1853 AD	Succeeded by Maharaja Jashwant Singh
