= Crewe (constituency) =

Parliamentary constituency in the United Kingdom, 1885–1983

- Former county constituency for the House of Commons
- Boundary of Crewe in Cheshire, boundaries 1974–1983
- County: Cheshire

1885–1983
- Seats: One
- Created from: Mid Cheshire and West Cheshire
- Replaced by: Crewe & Nantwich and Congleton

Crewe was a constituency of the House of Commons of the Parliament of the United Kingdom from 1885 to 1983. It elected one Member of Parliament (MP) by the first past the post system of election.

== History ==
Crewe was first created as one of eight single-member divisions of Cheshire under the Redistribution of Seats Act 1885. As its name suggested, the constituency was centred on the town of Crewe in Cheshire. The town of Nantwich was also included in the constituency until 1955, when it gained its own eponymous seat.

It was abolished following the reorganisation of local authorities in 1974 by the Third Periodic Review of Westminster constituencies for the 1983 general election, when it was divided roughly equally between the new constituencies of Crewe and Nantwich, and Congleton.

== Boundaries ==
1885–1918: The Municipal Borough of Crewe, and parts of the Sessional Divisions of Nantwich and Northwich.

Included the parishes of Alsager, Haslington, Nantwich and Sandbach.

1918–1950: The Municipal Borough of Crewe, the Urban Districts of Alsager and Nantwich, and parts of the Rural Districts of Congleton and Nantwich.

Sandbach transferred to Northwich.

1950–1955: The Municipal Borough of Crewe, the Urban District of Nantwich, and the Rural District of Nantwich.

Gained the remainder of the Rural District of Nantwich, including Audlem, from the abolished constituency of Eddisbury. Sandbach and the part of the Rural District of Congleton transferred to Knutsford.

1955–1983: The Municipal Borough of Crewe, the Urban Districts of Alsager and Sandbach, and in the Rural District of Nantwich the civil parishes of Barthomley, Crewe, Haslington, and Weston.

Gained Alsager and Sandbach back from Knutsford. The Urban District and the bulk of the Rural District of Nantwich transferred to the new constituency of Nantwich.

From 1 April 1974 until the constituency was abolished at the next boundary review which came into effect for the 1983 general election, the constituency comprised parts of the newly formed Boroughs of Congleton, and Crewe and Nantwich, but its boundaries were unchanged.

On abolition, the part comprising the former Municipal Borough of Crewe was included in the new constituency of Crewe and Nantwich, with Alsager, Haslington and Sandbach was added to the new constituency of Congleton.

== Members of Parliament ==
Election	Member	Party
1885	George William Latham	Liberal
1886	Walter McLaren	Liberal
1895	Robert Ward	Conservative
1900	James Tomkinson	Liberal
1910 by-election	Walter McLaren	Liberal
1912 by-election	Ernest Craig	Conservative
1918	Sir Joseph Davies	Coalition Liberal
Jan 1922	Sir Joseph Davies	National Liberal
Nov 1922	Edward Hemmerde	Labour
1924	Sir Ernest Craig, Bt	Conservative
1929	William Bowen	Labour
1931	Sir Donald Somervell	Conservative
1945	Scholefield Allen	Labour
Feb 1974	Gwyneth Dunwoody	Labour
1983	constituency abolished: see Crewe and Nantwich & Congleton	

== Elections ==
=== Elections in the 1880s ===
General election 1885: Crewe
Party	Candidate	Votes	%	±%
Liberal	George William Latham	5,089	54.3	
Conservative	Oscar Leslie Stephen	4,281	45.7	
Majority		808	8.6	
Turnout		9,370	86.6	
Registered electors		10,815		
Liberal win (new seat)				

General election 1886: Crewe
Party	Candidate	Votes	%	±%
Liberal	Walter McLaren	4,690	53.7	−0.6
Conservative	Francis Randle Twemlow	4,045	46.3	+0.6
Majority		645	7.4	−1.2
Turnout		8,735	80.8	−5.8
Registered electors		10,815		
Liberal hold		Swing	-0.6	

=== Elections in the 1890s ===
General election 1892: Crewe
Party	Candidate	Votes	%	±%
Liberal	Walter McLaren	5,558	58.2	+4.5
Conservative	Horace W Chatterton	3,990	41.8	−4.5
Majority		1,568	16.4	+9.0
Turnout		9,548	83.7	+2.9
Registered electors		11,412		
Liberal hold		Swing	+4.5	

Robert Ward

General election 1895: Crewe
Party	Candidate	Votes	%	±%
Conservative	Robert Ward	5,413	52.7	+10.9
Liberal	Walter McLaren	4,863	47.3	−10.9
Majority		550	5.4	N/A
Turnout		10,276	85.5	+1.8
Registered electors		12,018		
Conservative gain from Liberal		Swing	+10.9	

=== Elections in the 1900s ===
J. Tomkinson

General election 1900: Crewe
Party	Candidate	Votes	%	±%
Liberal	James Tomkinson	6,120	55.4	+8.1
Conservative	J E Reiss	4,921	44.6	−8.1
Majority		1,199	10.8	N/A
Turnout		11,041	82.1	−3.4
Registered electors		13,447		
Liberal gain from Conservative		Swing	+8.1	

General election 1906: Crewe
Party	Candidate	Votes	%	±%
Liberal	James Tomkinson	7,805	59.6	+4.2
Conservative	James Hugh Welsford	5,297	40.4	−4.2
Majority		2,508	19.2	+8.4
Turnout		13,102	87.1	+5.0
Registered electors		15,051		
Liberal hold		Swing	+4.2	

=== Elections in the 1910s ===
General election January 1910: Crewe
Party	Candidate	Votes	%	±%
Liberal	James Tomkinson	7,761	53.3	−6.3
Conservative	John Lane Harrington	5,419	37.2	−3.2
Labour	Frank Rose	1,380	9.5	New
Majority		2,342	16.1	−3.1
Turnout		14,560	91.8	+4.7
Registered electors		15,866		
Liberal hold		Swing	-1.6	

Walter McLaren

1910 Crewe by-election
Party	Candidate	Votes	%	±%
Liberal	Walter McLaren	7,639	55.8	+2.5
Conservative	James Hugh Welsford	6,041	44.2	+7.0
Majority		1,598	11.6	−4.5
Turnout		13,680	86.2	−5.6
Registered electors		15,866		
Liberal hold		Swing	-2.3	

General election December 1910: Crewe
Party	Candidate	Votes	%	±%
Liberal	Walter McLaren	7,629	56.3	+3.0
Conservative	Ernest Craig	5,925	43.7	+6.5
Majority		1,704	12.6	−3.5
Turnout		13,554	85.4	−6.4
Liberal hold		Swing	−1.8	

1912 Crewe by-election
Party	Candidate	Votes	%	±%
Unionist	Ernest Craig	6,260	44.6	+0.9
Liberal	Harold Lawson Murphy	5,294	37.7	−18.6
Labour	James Holmes	2,485	17.7	New
Majority		966	6.9	N/A
Turnout		14,039	88.1	+2.7
Registered electors		15,927		
Unionist gain from Liberal		Swing	+9.8	

General Election 1914–15:

Another General Election was required to take place before the end of 1915. The political parties had been making preparations for an election to take place and by July 1914, the following candidates had been selected;

- Unionist: Ernest Craig
- Liberal: Joseph Davies

Joseph Davies

General election 1918: Crewe
Party		Candidate	Votes	%	±%
C	National Liberal	Joseph Davies	13,392	56.2	−0.1
	Labour	James Brownlie	10,439	43.8	N/A
Majority			2,953	12.4	−0.2
Turnout			23,831	68.4	−17.0
Registered electors			34,818		
	National Liberal gain from Liberal		Swing	N/A	
C indicates candidate endorsed by the coalition government.

=== Elections in the 1920s ===
E.G. Hemmerde

General election 1922: Crewe
Party	Candidate	Votes	%	±%
Labour	Edward Hemmerde	15,311	50.9	+7.1
National Liberal	Joseph Davies	14,756	49.1	−7.1
Majority		555	1.8	N/A
Turnout		30,067	80.9	+12.5
Registered electors		37,159		
Labour gain from National Liberal		Swing	+7.1	

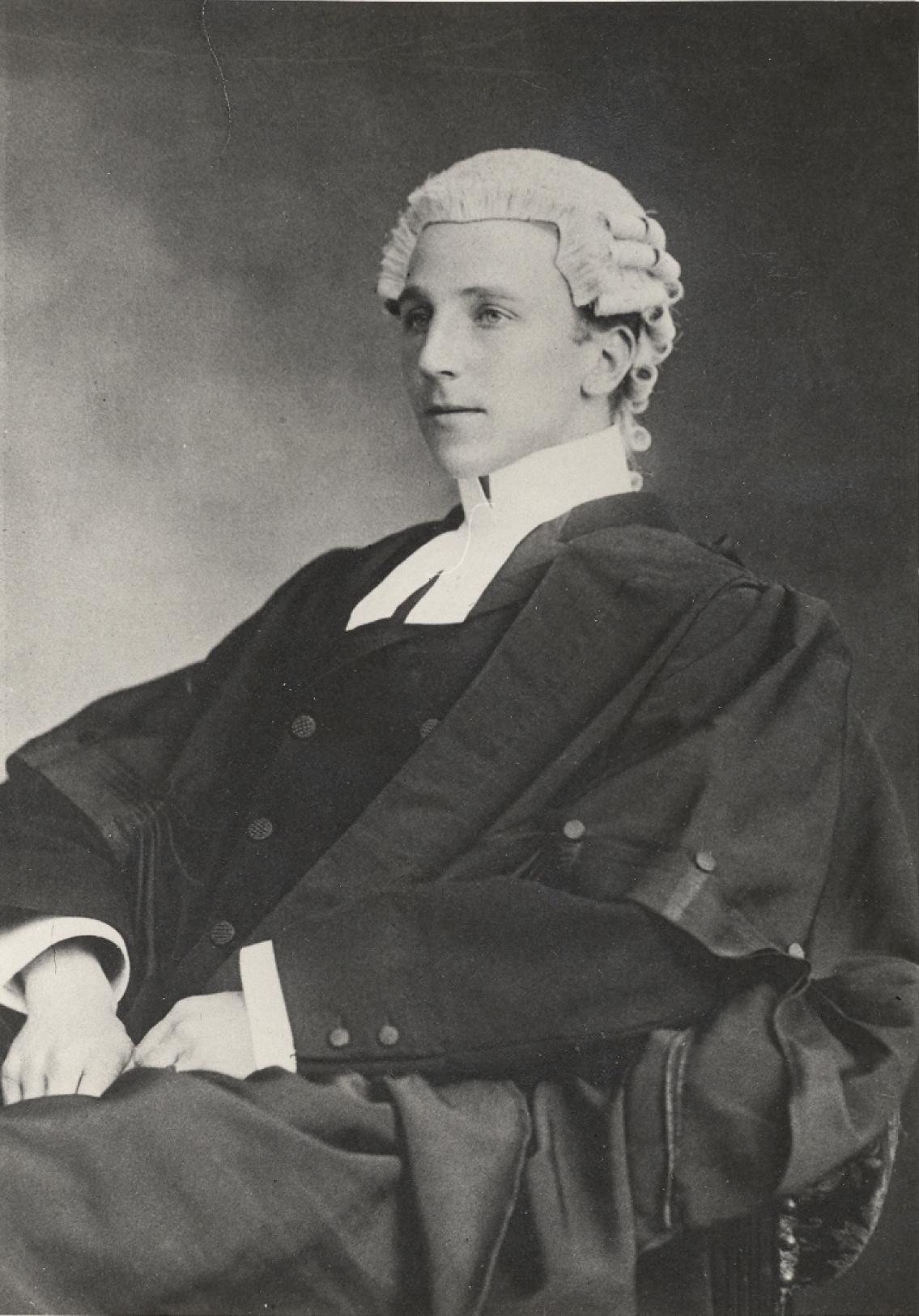
Thomas Strangman

General election 1923: Crewe
Party	Candidate	Votes	%	±%
Labour	Edward Hemmerde	14,628	46.5	−4.4
Unionist	Thomas Strangman	8,734	27.8	New
Liberal	Robert Mortimer Montgomery	8,068	25.7	−23.4
Majority		5,894	18.7	+16.9
Turnout		31,430	82.8	+1.9
Registered electors		37,959		
Labour hold		Swing	+9.5	

General election 1924: Crewe
Party	Candidate	Votes	%	±%
Unionist	Ernest Craig	18,333	55.5	+27.7
Labour	Edward Hemmerde	14,705	44.5	−2.0
Majority		3,628	11.0	N/A
Turnout		33,038	85.6	+2.8
Registered electors		38,583		
Unionist gain from Labour		Swing	+14.9	

- Liberal candidate, Alexander Lyle-Samuel withdrew.

General election 1929: Crewe
Party	Candidate	Votes	%	±%
Labour	William Bowen	20,948	50.2	+5.7
Unionist	Donald Somervell	11,732	28.1	−27.4
Liberal	William Craven Llewelyn	9,076	21.7	New
Majority		9,216	22.1	N/A
Turnout		41,756	83.7	−1.9
Registered electors		49,863		
Labour gain from Unionist		Swing	+16.6	

=== Elections in the 1930s ===
General election 1931: Crewe
Party	Candidate	Votes	%	±%
Conservative	Donald Somervell	25,141	57.8	+29.7
Labour	William Bowen	18,351	42.2	−8.0
Majority		6,790	15.6	−6.5
Turnout		43,492	84.5	+0.8
Conservative gain from Labour		Swing		

General election 1935: Crewe
Party	Candidate	Votes	%	±%
Conservative	Donald Somervell	21,729	51.3	−6.5
Labour	William Bowen	20,620	48.7	+6.5
Majority		1,109	2.6	−13.0
Turnout		42,349	80.3	−4.2
Conservative hold		Swing		

General Election 1939–40

Another General Election was required to take place before the end of 1940. The political parties had been making preparations for an election to take place and by the Autumn of 1939, the following candidates had been selected;

- Conservative: Donald Somervell
- Labour: William Bowen

=== Elections in the 1940s ===
General election 1945: Crewe
Party	Candidate	Votes	%	±%
Labour	Scholefield Allen	28,416	60.6	+11.9
Conservative	Donald Somervell	18,468	39.4	−11.9
Majority		9,948	21.2	N/A
Turnout		46,884	74.6	−5.7
Labour gain from Conservative		Swing		

=== Elections in the 1950s ===
General election 1950: Crewe
Party	Candidate	Votes	%	±%
Labour	Scholefield Allen	28,981	53.3	−7.3
Conservative	John Richard T. Turner	25,355	46.7	+7.3
Majority		3,626	6.6	−14.4
Turnout		54,336	86.7	+12.1
Labour hold		Swing		

General election 1951: Crewe
Party	Candidate	Votes	%	±%
Labour	Scholefield Allen	28,488	52.2	−1.1
Conservative	John Richard T. Turner	26,045	47.8	+1.1
Majority		2,443	4.6	−2.0
Turnout		54,533	86.6	−0.1
Labour hold		Swing		

General election 1955: Crewe
Party	Candidate	Votes	%	±%
Labour	Scholefield Allen	21,629	52.5	+0.3
Conservative	Granger Farwell Boston	15,273	37.1	−10.7
Liberal	Thomas Stuttard Rothwell	4,306	10.5	New
Majority		6,356	15.4	+10.8
Turnout		41,208	81.5	−5.1
Labour hold		Swing		

General election 1959: Crewe
Party	Candidate	Votes	%	±%
Labour	Scholefield Allen	22,811	54.5	+2.0
Conservative	Geoffrey Leonard Beaman	19,030	45.5	+8.4
Majority		3,781	9.0	−6.4
Turnout		41,841	82.1	+0.6
Labour hold		Swing		

=== Elections in the 1960s ===
General election 1964: Crewe
Party	Candidate	Votes	%	±%
Labour	Scholefield Allen	23,579	57.2	+2.7
Conservative	Anthony G. Barbour	17,657	42.8	−2.7
Majority		5,922	14.4	+5.4
Turnout		41,236	79.0	−3.1
Labour hold		Swing		

General election 1966: Crewe
Party	Candidate	Votes	%	±%
Labour	Scholefield Allen	24,141	61.0	+3.8
Conservative	Anthony G. Barbour	15,430	39.0	−3.8
Majority		8,711	22.0	+7.6
Turnout		39,571	75.6	−3.4
Labour hold		Swing		

=== Elections in the 1970s ===
General election 1970: Crewe
Party	Candidate	Votes	%	±%
Labour	Scholefield Allen	22,160	54.3	−6.7
Conservative	Alastair Goodlad	18,678	45.7	+6.7
Majority		3,482	8.6	−13.4
Turnout		40,838	71.0	−4.6
Labour hold		Swing		

General election February 1974: Crewe
Party	Candidate	Votes	%	±%
Labour	Gwyneth Dunwoody	21,259	46.5	−7.8
Conservative	James Graham Park	16,136	35.3	−10.4
Liberal	D. J. Hulland	8,313	18.2	New
Majority		5,123	11.2	+2.6
Turnout		45,708	77.8	+6.8
Labour hold		Swing		

General election October 1974: Crewe
Party	Candidate	Votes	%	±%
Labour	Gwyneth Dunwoody	21,534	49.7	+3.2
Conservative	James Graham Park	14,279	32.9	−2.4
Liberal	E.A. Richardson	7,559	17.4	−0.8
Majority		7,255	16.8	+5.6
Turnout		43,372	73.2	−4.6
Labour hold		Swing		

General election 1979: Crewe
Party	Candidate	Votes	%	±%
Labour	Gwyneth Dunwoody	22,288	48.3	−1.4
Conservative	John V. Butcher	18,051	39.1	+6.2
Liberal	C. Bithell	5,430	11.8	−5.6
National Front	W. Tonks	352	0.8	New
Majority		4,237	9.2	−7.6
Turnout		46,121	77.5	+4.5
Labour hold		Swing		

== See also ==
- History of parliamentary constituencies and boundaries in Cheshire
