= List of Latin Americans in the United Kingdom =

This is a list of notable Latin Americans in the United Kingdom people, including British people of Latin American ancestry and Latin American-born immigrants.

== Business ==
- Jaime Gilinski Bacal, banker and philanthropist, Colombian immigrant
- Roger Gifford, banker, Brazilian heritage
- Enriqueta Augustina Rylands, philanthropist, born in Cuba

== Entertainment ==
- Carlos Acosta, ballet director and dancer, born in Cuba
- Layla Anna-Lee, TV presenter, Brazilian mother
- Lorena Andrea, actress, Colombian parent
- Francesca Annis, actress, Brazilian-French mother
- Paloma Baeza, actress, Mexican father
- Joseph Balderrama, actor, born in Mexico
- Michael Bentine, actor/comedian, Peruvian father
- Magdalen Berns, YouTuber, boxer and software developer, Argentine father
- Naima Bock, musician, Brazilian father
- Dane Bowers, musician, Cuban-Jamaican father
- V V Brown, singer-songwriter, Puerto Rican father
- Adam Buxton, comedian and actor, Chilean mother
- Santiago Cabrera, actor, Chilean parents
- Sophie Castillo, singer-songwriter, Colombian and Cuban parents
- Oona Chaplin, actress, born in Spain, Chilean father
- Charly Clive, actress, Mexican-American mother
- Claudia Coulter, actress, model and voice over artist, Argentine descent
- Taio Cruz, singer, Brazilian mother
- Henry Ian Cusick, actor, Peruvian mother
- Michel de Carvalho, actor, Brazilian father
- Delilah, singer-songwriter, Cuban heritage
- Nell de Silva, actress, Chilean parents
- Paul Di'Anno, heavy metal singer, Brazilian father
- Alfred Enoch, actor, Brazilian mother
- Lino Facioli, actor, born in Brazil
- Giovanna Falcone, reality TV star, Argentine mother
- Mario Falcone, reality TV star, Argentine mother
- Luis Felber, musician, Peruvian mother
- Julie Fernandez, actress, Argentine father
- Liana Flores, singer–songwriter, Brazilian mother
- Margot Fonteyn, ballerina, Brazilian maternal grandfather
- Vanessa Forero, musician, Colombian mother
- Peter Gadiot, actor, Mexican mother
- Talisa García, actress, born in Chile
- Gala Gordon, model and actress, Argentine father
- Mia Goth, actress, Brazilian mother
- Rosianna Halse Rojas, YouTuber, Mexican mother
- Dhani Harrison, singer, Mexican-American mother
- Tara Hoyos-Martínez, 2010 Miss Universe Great Britain, Colombian parents
- Olivia Hussey, actress, Argentine father
- Nick Jago, musician, Peruvian mother
- Jamz Supernova, DJ and presenter, Cuban heritage
- John Justin, actor, Argentine father
- Kamille, singer, Cuban heritage
- Sasha Keable, singer-songwriter, Colombian mother
- Emma Kingston, actress, Argentine mother
- Charlotte Lewis, actress, maternal Chilean heritage
- Phil Manzanera, musician, Colombian mother
- Muriel Martin-Harvey, actress, Chilean maternal grandfather
- Wilnelia Merced, Miss World winner, Puerto Rican immigrant
- Sonoya Mizuno, actress, British-Argentine mother
- Jake Nava, music video director, Afro-Mexican father
- Tara Palmer-Tomkinson, television personality, Anglo-Argentine mother
- Bill Pertwee, actor, Brazilian mother
- Azela Robinson, actress, Mexican mother
- Chance Perdomo, actor, Guatemalan/Dominican (Republic) heritage
- Cleo Rocos, Brazilian comedy actress, producer, presenter and businesswoman
- Miguel Sapochnik, director, Argentine
- Katy Louise Saunders, retired actress, Colombian mother
- Elena Saurel, actress, Salvadoran
- Kaya Scodelario, actress, Brazilian mother
- Seal, singer, Brazilian father
- Teddy Sinclair, singer, Uruguayan mother
- Amarah-Jae St. Aubyn, actress, Cuban-Jamaican heritage
- Anya Taylor-Joy, actress, Argentine father also grew up in Argentina
- Sean Teale, actor, Venezuelan descent
- Thalissa Teixeira, actress, Brazilian father
- Martina Topley-Bird, musician, maternal Salvadoran heritage
- Harley Viera-Newton, model and DJ, Brazilian mother
- Ed Weeks, actor, Salvadorean mother
- Sonya Walger, actress, Argentine father
- Yung Filly, YouTuber, Colombian-born

== Fashion ==
- Alice Dellal, model, Brazilian mother
- Torishéju Dumi, fashion designer, Brazilian parents
- Jade Jagger, fashion designer, Nicaraguan mother
- Jessica Jordan, beauty queen, Bolivian mother
- Wilnelia Merced, beauty queen, born in Puerto Rico

== Medicine and science ==
- Alex Kacelnik, Argentine-born ethologist and zoologist
- Claudio Sillero-Zubiri, Argentine-born zoologist
- Estela V. Welldon, Argentine forensic psychotherapist and psychiatrist, and author

== Politics ==
- Laura Alvarez, human rights lawyer & coffee importer, wife of Labour Party leader Jeremy Corbyn, Mexican immigrant
- Catherine Atkinson, Labour MP, Mexican-American grandparents
- Rocío Cifuentes, academic and Children's Commissioner for Wales, born in Chile
- Leticia Gonzalez, Plaid Cymru politician, born in Argentina
- Bianca Jagger, human rights advocate, Nicaraguan immigrant
- Marie-Chantal, Crown Princess of Greece, wife of Pavlos, Crown Prince of Greece, Ecuadorian mother
- Sylvia Scaffardi, campaigner, Anglo-Brazilian

== Sports ==
- Yamilé Aldama, triple jumper, born in Cuba
- Sergio Agüero ("Kun"), Argentine footballer for Manchester City
- Yamilé Aldama, triple jumper, Cuban immigrant
- Steven Alzate, British-born footballer of Colombian descent
- Danny Anisjko, footballer who plays for Latvia, Ecuadorian mother
- Osvaldo Ardiles, former Argentine footballer and football coach
- Philip Awiti-Alcaraz, judoka, Mexican mother
- Prisca Awiti Alcaraz, judoka, Mexican mother
- Marcos Ayerza, Argentine rugby union player for Leicester Tigers
- Jean Beausejour, Chilean footballer for Wigan Athletic
- Ben Brereton Díaz, footballer, Chilean mother
- Gonzalo Camacho, Argentine rugby union player for Leicester Tigers
- Joe Devera, footballer, Venezuelan father
- Ignacio Elosu, Argentine rugby union player for Exeter Chiefs
- Luis Fontés, racing driver, Brazilian parents
- Ade Gardner, footballer, maternal Brazilian heritage
- Ben Hockin, swimmer, Paraguayan mother
- Gonzalo Jara, Chilean footballer for Nottingham Forest
- Nahuel Lobo, Argentine rugby union player for the Newcastle Falcons
- Pablo Matera, Argentine rugby union player for Leicester Tigers
- Sebastian Melrose, racing driver, Salvadoran mother
- Ignacio Mieres, Argentine rugby union player for Worcester Warriors
- Johnny Nelson, boxer, Cuban-Jamaican mother
- Natalia Pallu-Neves, ice dancer, Brazilian parents
- Antonio Pedroza, footballer, Mexican father
- Diego Poyet, Spanish-born English footballer of Uruguayan descent.
- Luka Radojević, footballer who plays for Montenegro, Brazilian mother
- Julián Speroni, Argentine footballer for Crystal Palace FC
- Gary Stempel, football coach, Panamanian-British
- Gonzalo Tiesi, Argentine rugby union player for London Welsh
- Tuco Tokkos, mixed martial artist, Brazilian mother
- Lawrence Vigouroux, footballer, paternal Brazilian heritage

== Writers ==
- Manuel Alvarado, academic, born in Guatemala
- Tom Burns, publisher, Chilean mother
- Caroline Criado-Perez, journalist, Argentine father
- Consuelo De Reyes, dramatist and theatre director, Cuban father
- Marcelo Dos Santos, Australian-born playwright and screenwriter, Brazilian father
- Yara Rodrigues Fowler, novelist, Brazilian mother
- Daisy Goodwin, screenwriter and novelist, maternal Argentine heritage
- Nick Grosso, playwright, Argentine parents
- E. L. James, author, Chilean mother
- Danielle Jawando, children's and YA author, paternal Brazilian heritage
- Callie Kazumi, novelist, Colombian-Scottish father and Nikkei Japanese-Brazilian mother
- Carlos Lopez-Barillas, writer/photographer, Guatemalan immigrant
- Santa Montefiore, author, Anglo-Argentine mother
- Julian MacLaren-Ross, writer, Scottish-Cuban father
- Pip Williams, English-born Australian author, Brazilian mother

== Art and design ==
- Hannah Berry, comics artist, Ecuadorian mother
- Marcelo de Melo, born in Brazil
- Adam Nathaniel Furman, artist and designer, Argentine father
- Carlos Lopez-Barillas, photographer, born in Guatemala
- Alexi Lubomirski, photographer, English-Peruvian mother
- Yulia Mahr, Hungarian-born artist, Chilean mother
- Otto Schade, artist, born in Chile
- Dairo Vargas Cerquera, artist, born in Colombia
- Edward Wright, artist, Ecuadorian vice-consul/Chilean mother

== Other ==
- Manuel Barcia, Vice-Chancellor of the University of Bath, born in Cuba
- Adam Castillejo, second person to be cured of HIV, born in Venezuela
- Liliane Landor, Lebanese-born journalist, Cuban mother

== See also ==
- Latin America–United Kingdom relations
- Latin American migration to the United Kingdom
- List of Hispanic and Latino Americans
