= Palmer-Tomkinson =

Palmer-Tomkinson may refer to

- Charles Palmer-Tomkinson (born 1940), English landowner, former soldier and skier, a close friend of Charles, Prince of Wales
- James Palmer-Tomkinson (1915–1952), British alpine skier
- James Palmer-Tomkinson (1879–1961), British cricketer
- Jeremy Palmer-Tomkinson (born 1943), English Olympian
- Tara Palmer-Tomkinson (1971–2017), English socialite, "It girl", television presenter, and columnist

== See also ==
- Palmer (surname)
- Tomkinson
