= Poverty in Switzerland =

Poverty in Switzerland refers to people who are living in relative poverty in Switzerland. In 2018, 7.9% of the population or some 660,000 people in Switzerland were affected by income poverty. Switzerland has also a significant number of working poor, estimated at 145,000 in 2015.

Historically, Switzerland has been a poor country, especially the Alpine regions. From the 17th century, incipient industrialisation brought wealth to the cities, particularly to Zürich, but rural areas remained destitute well into the 19th century, causing the peasant war in 1653, and later forcing families to emigrate both to Russia and the Americas (including to Argentina, Brazil, Canada, Chile, Guatemala, the United States, Uruguay, and Venezuela).

In the 20th century, the economy of modern Switzerland came to establish itself among the world's most prosperous and stable, and in terms of human development index (at 0.962) Switzerland ranks first worldwide. As of 2019, Switzerland had the highest average wealth per adult, at $564,653.

According to the 2026-figures from the Federal Statistical Office, 8.4% of the population lives on less than the subsistence level, compared to 6.7% in 2014, which is slightly lower than the record rate of 8.7% reached in 2019 and 2021.

== General statistics on income and wealth ==
In 2013 the mean household income in Switzerland was CHF 120,624 (c. USD 134,000 nominal, US$101,000 PPP), the mean household income after social security, taxes and mandatory health insurance was CHF 85,560 (c. USD 95,000 nominal, US$72,000 PPP). The OECD lists Swiss household gross adjusted disposable income per capita US$32,594 PPP for 2011.

As of 2016, Switzerland had the highest average wealth per adult, at $561,900. The top 1% richest persons own 35% of all the wealth in Switzerland, and this disparity has been increasing in recent years according to official statistics.

This development was tied to the exchange rate between the US Dollar and the Swiss franc, which caused capital in Swiss francs to more than double its value in dollar terms during the 2000s and especially in the wake of the 2008 financial crisis, without any direct increase in value in terms of domestic purchasing power.

Switzerland has the comparatively high Gini coefficient of 0.8, similar to the US and Denmark, indicating unequal distribution. The high average wealth is explained by a comparatively high number of individuals who are extremely wealthy; the median (50th percentile) wealth of a Swiss adult is five times lower than the average, at US$100,900 (US$70,000 PPP as of 2011).

== Poverty ==
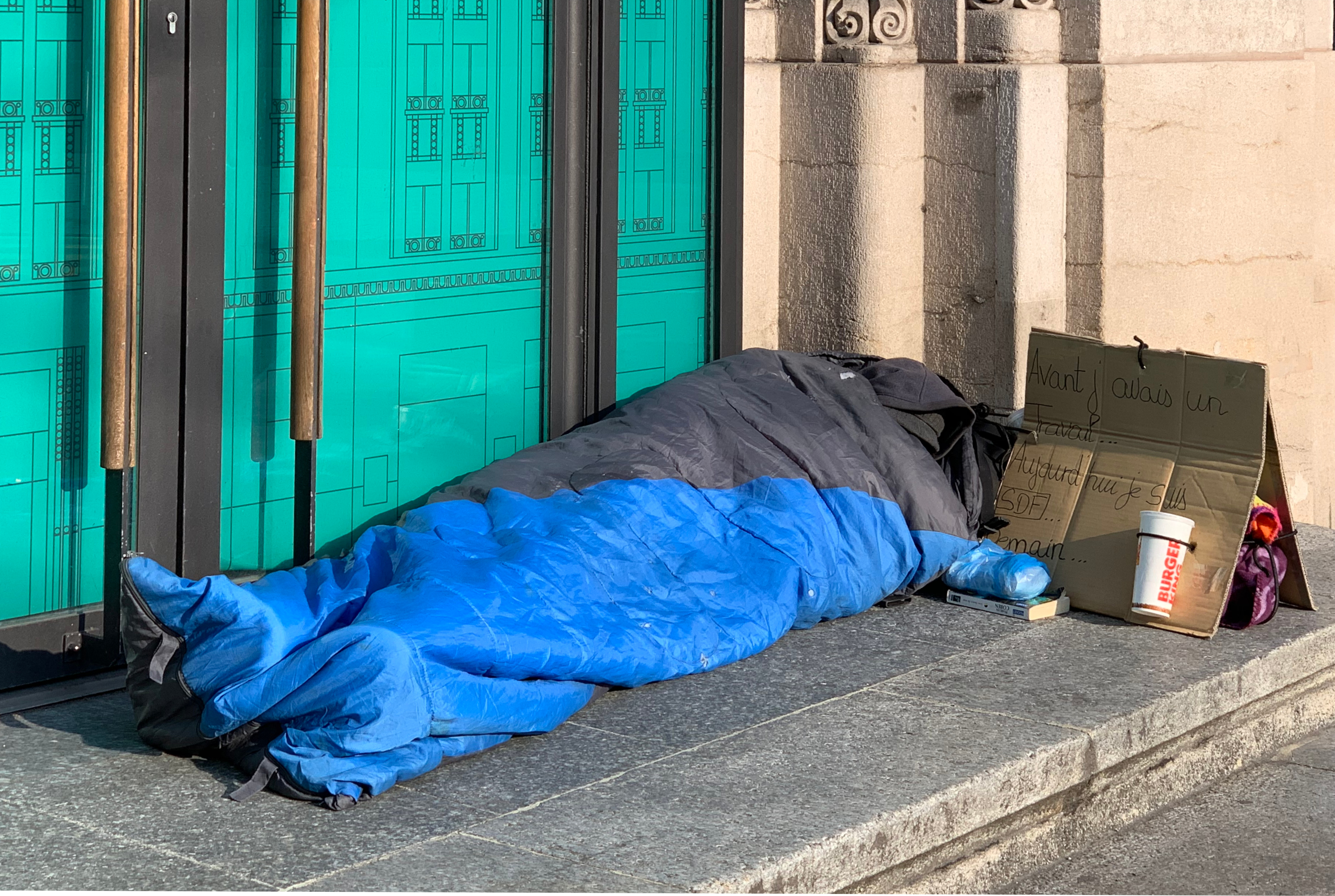
Homeless person in Lausanne in 2019

Switzerland has a significant number of working poor, estimated at 145,000 in 2015. This number is out of a total of approximately 570,000 people (or about 7% of the total population) living in poverty. This number shows a slight increase from 2014 when it was 6.6%. In the same year, 8.9% of the population was making less than 50% of the median equalised income (about €19,793, SFr 24,041), with 4.5% making less than 40% (€15,834, SFr 19,232).

There exists several groups who are at higher risk of poverty. They include those in a household where no one was gainfully employed (18.2% at risk of poverty), single adults living alone (12.5%), single parent households with children (12.5%) and those without any optional schooling (10.9%). Resident foreigners had a higher rate than Swiss citizens, with those from outside Europe having a poverty risk nearly twice that of citizens.

=== Compared to neighboring countries ===
As of 2016, Switzerland has a lower rate of people making 50% of the median equalised income (8.9%) than the European Union (10.9%), United Kingdom (9.9%) and Germany (9.7%), but a higher rate than countries such as Finland (4.9%), France (6.8%) and Austria (8.1%). The following chart provides information on the percentage and total numbers of the total population at risk for poverty (making less than 50% of the median equivalised income), the employed who are at risk for poverty and the 50% level for each country in equivalent purchasing power.

50% of median equivalised income numbers for selected European countries (2016 or ^a 2015).
Nation	Percentage	People (in thousands)	Employed % (18–24)	Employed % (18–64)	Threshold amount Single Person (Purchasing Power)
Serbia	19.3	1,355	12.5	12.3	2,628
Romania	19.2	3,804	31.2	18.6	2,397
Bulgaria	16.5	1,181	13.5	11.6	3,372
Lithuania	15.9	459	9.1	8.7	4,639
Spain	15.5	7,114	18.3	13.1	7,587
Greece	15.3	1,629	19	14	4,414
Latvia	14.4	280	8.5	8.5	4,599
Italy	14	8,500	13.3	11.4	8,267
Croatia	13.5	558	8.5	5.5	4,414
Estonia	13.1	170	7.4	9.9	5,930
Portugal	13	1,341	12	10.8	5,357
Poland	11.1	4,163	10.9	10.9	5,425
European Union (28 countries)	10.9	54,699	12.1	9.6	N/A
Euro area (19 countries)	10.8	35,984	12.7	9.5	N/A
Luxembourg	10.3	59	13.1	12	14,051
United Kingdom	9.9	6,391	8.4	8.6	8,760
Germany	9.7	7,931	14	9.5	10,605
Sweden	9.4	929	16	6.8	10,353
Switzerland	8.9	728	8.7	7.3	13,544
Belgium	8.6	970	4.6	4.7	10,410
Cyprus	8.3	70	10.2	8.4	7,993
Slovenia	8.2	166	7	6.1	7,750
Austria	8.1	700	12.4	8.3	11,262
Slovakia	8.1	426	2.7	6.5	5,254
Hungary	7.8	752	8.6	9.7	4,194
Malta	7.7	33	3.6	5.7	8,462
Norway	6.9	357	23.3	5.9	14,308
Denmark	6.8	387	21.3	5.3	10,560
France	6.8	4,269	12.8	8	10,375
Netherlands	6.6	1,104	7.1	5.6	10,497
Czech Republic	5.3	543	3.1	3.8	6,257
Finland	4.9	263	4.8	3.1	9,883
Ireland^{a}	8.8	411	5.8	4.8	8,852
Iceland^{a}	5.5	17	10.6	7	10,039
FYR Macedonia^{a}	15.5	321	7.7	8.8	2,278
Turkey^{a}	15.5	11,868	14.3	13.7	2,831

=== By age ===
Those of retirement age (older than 65) are almost twice as likely to be living below the poverty line than the rest of the population, especially if they lived alone (22.8%, see chart below). However, these statistics don't take into account assets which a person had saved or purchased while working. The number of retirement age people who could afford an unexpected expense was almost half of the national average. In fact, only 1.9% of retirees were unable to pay their bills on time, compared to 9.3% of 18 to 64 year olds.

Poverty indicators by age (2015)
Poverty indicators					Survey – % who agreed with the statement						
Categories	% entire population in danger of poverty (50% median)	% workers in danger of poverty (50% median)	% entire population below poverty line	% workers below poverty line	Must use their reserves to make ends meet	Are going deeper in debt	Hard or very hard to make ends meet	Can't afford an unexpected 2,500 SFr expense	Can't afford a one-week vacation per year	Can't afford two meals per day	Can't afford to heat their home
0–17	8.7	–	5.1	–	2.3	3.6	15.1	28.7	10.3	1.5	0.9
18–64	6.6	4.3	5.8	3.9	1.2	2.8	11.4	22.3	8.3	1.4	0.6
18–24	9.1	6.2	7.5	4.3	3.3	3.5	11.6	25.6	9.3	2.1	0.5
25–49	6.5	4.5	5.2	3.7	1.4	2.9	11.7	23.5	7.8	1.3	0.7
50–64	5.6	3.3	6.2	4.0	1.9	2.5	10.6	18.9	8.9	1.4	0.5
65 and above	10.4	5.3	13.9	5.0	2.3	1.0	6.7	11.7	7.7	1.0	0.3
Total Population	7.6	4.3	7.0	3.9	1.2	2.7	11.2	21.7	8.6	1.4	0.6

=== By sex, language and national origin ===
Poverty indicators by sex, language and national origin
Poverty indicators					Survey – % who agreed with the statement						
Categories	% entire population in danger of poverty (50% median)	% workers in danger of poverty (50% median)	% entire population below poverty line	% workers below poverty line	Must use their reserves to make ends meet	Are going deeper in debt	Hard or very hard to make ends meet	Can't afford an unexpected 2,500 SFr expense	Can't afford a one-week vacation per year	Can't afford two meals per day	Can't afford to heat their home
Female	8.2	4.6	8.1	4.5	1.3	2.4	11.5	22.1	9.3	1.6	0.6
Male	7.0	4.1	6.0	3.4	1.3	2.9	11.0	21.2	7.8	1.2	0.7
German/Romansh speaking	6.5	3.7	6.3	3.5	1.3	2.4	8.5	17.4	7.6	1.4	0.5
French speaking	8.5	4.2	7.5	3.2	2.6	3.6	17.7	32.3	10.6	1.2	0.9
Italian speaking	20.2	16.9	16.4	15.8	7.2	2.4	19.1	30.3	12.7	2.6	0.5
Swiss Citizen	6.1	2.9	6.4	3.1	1.3	1.8	8.1	15.7	7.6	1.0	0.4
Total Resident Foreigner	12.3	8.3	9.0	6.3	2.4	5.5	21.0	40.0	11.7	2.4	1.3
Origin: North & West Europe	5.6	3.2	5.4	3.0	3.1	1.2	6.5	16.9	5.7	1.3	0.7
Origin: Southern Europe	14.9	10.8	8.9	6.8	4.5	3.7	24.7	46.2	13.8	1.8	2.0
Origin:Outside Europe	15.2	10.8	11.7	9.1	4.3	10.3	28.8	52.3	14.4	3.7	1.3
Total Population	7.6	4.3	7.0	3.9	1.2	2.7	11.2	21.7	8.6	1.4	0.6

=== By education level ===
Poverty indicators by education level
Poverty indicators					Survey – % who agreed with the statement						
Categories	% entire population in danger of poverty (50% median)	% workers in danger of poverty (50% median)	% entire population below poverty line	% workers below poverty line	Must use their reserves to make ends meet	Are going deeper in debt	Hard or very hard to make ends meet	Can't afford an unexpected 2,500 SFr expense	Can't afford a one-week vacation per year	Can't afford two meals per day	Can't afford to heat their home
Mandatory school only	13.1	10.4	10.9	7.0	2.6	4.7	20.1	38.5	14.1	2.2	1.1
Upper Secondary	7.0	4.6	7.5	4.3	1.4	2.5	9.7	20.2	8.7	1.6	0.5
University/College	4.7	2.1	5.4	2.4	1.4	1.1	5.9	9.3	3.9	0.5	0.4

=== By family type ===
Poverty indicators by family type
Poverty indicators					Survey – % who agreed with the statement						
Categories	% entire population in danger of poverty (50% median)	% workers in danger of poverty (50% median)	% entire population below poverty line	% workers below poverty line	Must use their reserves to make ends meet	Are going deeper in debt	Hard or very hard to make ends meet	Can't afford an unexpected 2,500 SFr expense	Can't afford a one-week vacation per year	Can't afford two meals per day	Can't afford to heat their home
Single under 65	10.1	6.5	12.5	8.3	2.2	4.0	14.8	27.1	11.4	3.2	0.7
Single over 65	14.3	–	22.8	–	3.4	1.0	8.9	16.6	9.8	1.9	0.4
Couple, no children, under 65	4.3	2.5	3.6	1.6	2.3	1.1	6.0	12.2	3.5	0.2	0.3
Couple, no children, over 65	8.3	3.2	10.0	4.3	0.0	0.0	0.0	7.3	6.0	0.4	0.4
Single parent with 1 child	6.0	3.7	11.0	2.0	7.2	3.4	23.2	44.2	17.0	3.2	0.0
Single parent with 2 or more children	17.7	5.8	10.7	4.3	7.5	11.0	29.2	47.4	23.0	6.5	1.6
Couple with 1 child	6.0	4.7	4.2	2.9	3.4	3.9	12.9	23.5	8.6	0.7	0.9
Couple with 2 children	5.1	0.0	3.6	0.0	3.2	2.2	10.5	22.3	7.7	1.2	0.3
Couple with 3 or more children	8.0	0.0	3.5	0.0	5.1	1.4	12.1	28.0	10.2	1.3	1.8
Single parent with an adult child	4.9	0.0	4.8	0.0	5.8	2.0	9.8	21.2	13.8	0.0	0.4

=== Regional statistics ===
Regional unemployment, income and education statistics.
Canton	% 15–64 year olds working (2015)	Unemployment rate (2016)	% Receiving assistance (2015)	Completed mandatory schooling only^{a} (2015)	Completed secondary school^{a} (2015)	Completed tertiary school^{a} (2015)	Per capita income (pre-tax) 2013	Status index^{b} 2000	High-Tech industry Index^{c} (2015)	Knowledge intensive index^{c} (2015)
Switzerland	81.5	3.3	3.2	21.1	46.1	32.7	SFr 35,825	50.0	1.0	1.0
Zurich	83.8	3.7	3.2	16.3	43.8	39.9	SFr 41,575	55.5	0.6	1.2
Berne	84.2	2.7	4.2	18.2	51.7	30.1	SFr 31,504	47.8	0.9	1.0
Lucerne	83.9	2.1	2.2	20.2	49.6	30.2	SFr 33,180	47.6	0.8	0.9
Uri	84.1	1.0	1.1	29.4	51.3	19.2	SFr 27,772	41.3	0.9	0.7
Schwyz	83.1	1.8	1.4	22.0	48.0	30.1	SFr 51,545	48.1	0.7	0.8
Obwald	83.2	1.0	1.0	22.3	50.5	27.2	SFr 38,842	44.5	1.5	0.7
Nidwald	85.6	1.1	0.9	19.6	49.0	31.3	SFr 46,206	51.3	1.7	0.8
Glaris	84.1	2.4	1.9	30.2	46.3	23.4	SFr 30,400	42.8	1.2	0.7
Zoug	82.1	2.4	1.7	14.7	43.1	42.2	SFr 56,684	58.1	1.4	1.0
Friburg	80.8	2.8	2.5	29.2	42.2	28.7	SFr 30,461	46.7	0.8	0.9
Soleure	82.4	3.0	3.5	20.5	53.5	26.0	SFr 34,084	47.7	1.6	0.8
Basle-City	79.1	3.9	5.9	21.3	37.4	41.3	SFr 41,447	53.2	1.7	1.2
Basle-Country	80.3	3.0	2.8	17.2	51.3	31.5	SFr 39,983	54.1	1.4	0.9
Schaffhouse	80.3	3.3	2.6	18.3	55.0	26.7	SFr 32,020	45.7	2.0	0.8
Appenzell Outer-Rhodes	82.6	1.8	2.0	15.6	54.6	29.8	SFr 32,538	47.8	1.4	0.9
Appenzell Inner-Rhodes	85.0	1.1	0.8	21.1	54.2	24.7	SFr 32,731	42.5	0.8	0.6
St Gall	82.1	2.5	2.2	21.7	51.9	26.3	SFr 30,336	46.6	1.3	0.8
Grisons	82.8	1.7	1.3	21.5	52.3	26.2	SFr 33,075	45.3	0.5	0.8
Argovia	82.7	3.2	2.2	19.2	50.6	30.2	SFr 35,073	50.9	1.5	0.8
Thurgovia	82.8	2.5	1.8	19.7	53.2	27.0	SFr 32,694	48.3	1.2	0.8
Tessin	73.1	3.5	2.6	25.0	44.8	30.2	SFr 33,527	45.6	0.9	1.0
Vaud	78.5	4.7	4.8	25.2	37.5	37.3	SFr 35,879	51.6	0.7	1.1
Valais	79.0	3.9	1.8	30.2	44.0	25.7	SFr 29,518	42.8	0.7	0.8
Neuchâtel	79.0	5.8	7.2	28.8	41.9	29.3	SFr 30,172	48.3	2.9	0.8
Geneva	76.1	5.5	5.5	25.2	31.5	43.3	SFr 39,261	55.2	0.7	1.2
Jura	77.6	4.6	2.8	31.3	45.2	23.5	SFr 26,992	42.5	2.8	0.7

1. Percent of those 25 and older who have completed the listed education.
2. An index (50 is the national average) that attempts to quantifies status. Formula is (2.5 × % Tertiary education completed)−(2.0 × % Mandatory education only)+(% Management and skilled workers) − (% Unskilled workers) + (4 × % High income) − (2 × % Low income)
3. Ratio of workers in industries classed as High Tech or Knowledge-Intensive compared to national average (set to 1.0).

== History ==
=== COVID-19 pandemic ===
In 2020, the COVID-19 pandemic in Switzerland and the measures taken in response to it led to a recession, with many residents losing employment, income and wealth. In Geneva, a large-scale weekly distribution of food was organised, leading to thousands of people queuing for hours to receive a bag of basic staples. The scene attracted a lot of media attention in Geneva, throughout Switzerland and across the world, with journalists seizing on the scene as significant event given Geneva's status as one of the richest cities in the world. The recurring event led to a lot of comments by various politicians, experts and public figures, as well as on social media. Some commentators argued that this poverty was not a new phenomenon, was not exclusive to Geneva and was simply made more visible by the crisis. In other cities too, people queued for food, the absence of queues as large as those in Geneva being arguably due to differences in organisation of food distribution rather than needs, as well as lesser fear of arrest for undocumented people, although Geneva was probably the canton hardest hit by precarity before the coronavirus crisis. A survey conducted by Doctors without Borders and Geneva University Hospitals in which close to a third of the food parcel beneficiaries participated estimated that 60% of them lacked health insurance, with a diversity of socioeconomic profiles, including employed and unemployed people, as well as short time workers. Three quarters of people who queued were women, and around half were undocumented, a quarter were foreigners with residency permits, 5% were asylum seekers and 4% were Swiss citizens. The survey also found that members of the disadvantaged group were almost five times more exposed to the effects of COVID-19 due to problems such as cramped living conditions and reduced possibilities of getting treatment or a test.

== See also ==
- Economy of Switzerland
- Poverty by country

== Literature ==
- Christin Kehrli, Carlo Knöpfel, Handbuch Armut in der Schweiz
- Armut in der Schweiz, Evangelical People's Party (EVP) of the canton of Zürich (1999)
