= Hanford School =

Hanford Prep
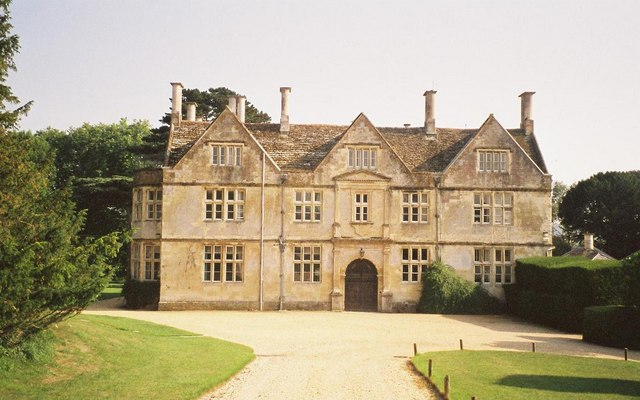
- Hanford Prep

Location
- DT11 8HN; 50°53′57″N 2°13′19″W

Information
- Type: Private preparatory school Boarding school
- Religious affiliation: Church of England
- Established: 1947
- Local authority: Dorset
- Department for Education URN: 113911 Tables
- Head teacher: Sophie Blewitt
- Gender: Girls
- Age: 7 to 13
- Enrolment: c. 70
- Grounds: 45 acres (18 ha)
- Website: https://www.hanfordprep.group

Hanford Prep is a girls' boarding preparatory school located in Hanford, Child Okeford, Dorset, England, established in 1947 and located in a grade II* listed house built in 1604 by Sir Robert Seymer.

== History ==
Hanford House was built in Jacobean style in 1604, or 1620, and completed in 1623, by Sir Robert Seymer, who was a teller of the Exchequer and who was knighted in 1619, and whose family had lived in Hanford for several centuries, and the small Gothic chapel was built in 1650. Country Life magazine wrote in 1905 that "the chapel is a picturesque building with a high gable, pleasant to look at, and within are several memorials of the Seymers."

In 1947, the house and grounds were bought by the Reverend and Mrs. Clifford Canning and converted to a school. Clifford Canning had been headmaster of Canford School. In 1959, the school was taken over by their daughter, Sarah. In 1960, the building was listed as grade II*, ten days after the nearby Church of St Michael and All Angels. After retiring as headmistress in 2003, she handed the school over to the Hanford School Charitable Trust in 2004, which now runs it.

== Headmasters and Mistresses ==
- The Reverend Clifford and Enid Canning (1947 - 1959)
- Sarah Canning (1959 - 2003)
- Michael and Ann Sharp (1980s - 2003)
- Robert and Kate Mackenzie Johnston (1994 - 2003)
- Nigel and Sarah Mackay (2003 - 2014)
- Rory and George Johnston (2014 - 2023)
- Mrs Hilary Phillips (2023 - 2025)
- Mrs Sophie Blewitt (2025 - Present)

== Notable staff ==
- Sarah Butt, captain of the England lacrosse national team

== Notable alumni ==
- Amanda Foreman
- Millie Mackintosh Made in Chelsea
- Santa Montefiore
- Candida Moss
- Kate Rock, Baroness Rock
- Tara Palmer-Tomkinson
- Dame Emma Kirkby
