= Tonkinson =

Tonkinson is a surname. Notable people with the surname include:

- Albert Tonkinson (born 1936), English rugby league player
- Paul Tonkinson (born 1969), English comedian, radio presenter, and television personality
- Robert Tonkinson (born 1938), Australian anthropologist

== See also ==
- Tomkinson
