= Alexy van Kimmenade =

Alexy van Kimmenade (born: Van de Kimmenade) (born 15 December 1981 in Merksem, Belgium) was the star of reality TV programme Dirty Cows, presented by Tara Palmer-Tomkinson.

His parents are (Dutchman) Wim van Kimmenade and (Belgian) Pinky Countess le Grelle (daughter of count Pierre-Amaury le Grelle), who divorced in 1986. This was Pinky le Grelle's second marriage; she was previously married to Dominique Baron de Meester de Ravestein.

In 2018, Alexy was convicted of speeding and perverting the course of justice after making a false statement that his father Wim had been driving during the speeding offence. He was sentenced at Truro Crown Court with a suspended sentence of two years, as well as 300 hours'community service, a £150 fine and £250 in costs, while three points were added to his driving licence.

Alexy grew up in Belgium, the Netherlands, Austria and on estate in Cornwall, and was educated at different schools in Belgium and England. He speaks several languages. He also has an older brother named Roderick.
