= Kate Rock, Baroness Rock =

British politician (born 1968)

The Right Honourable The Baroness Rock DL
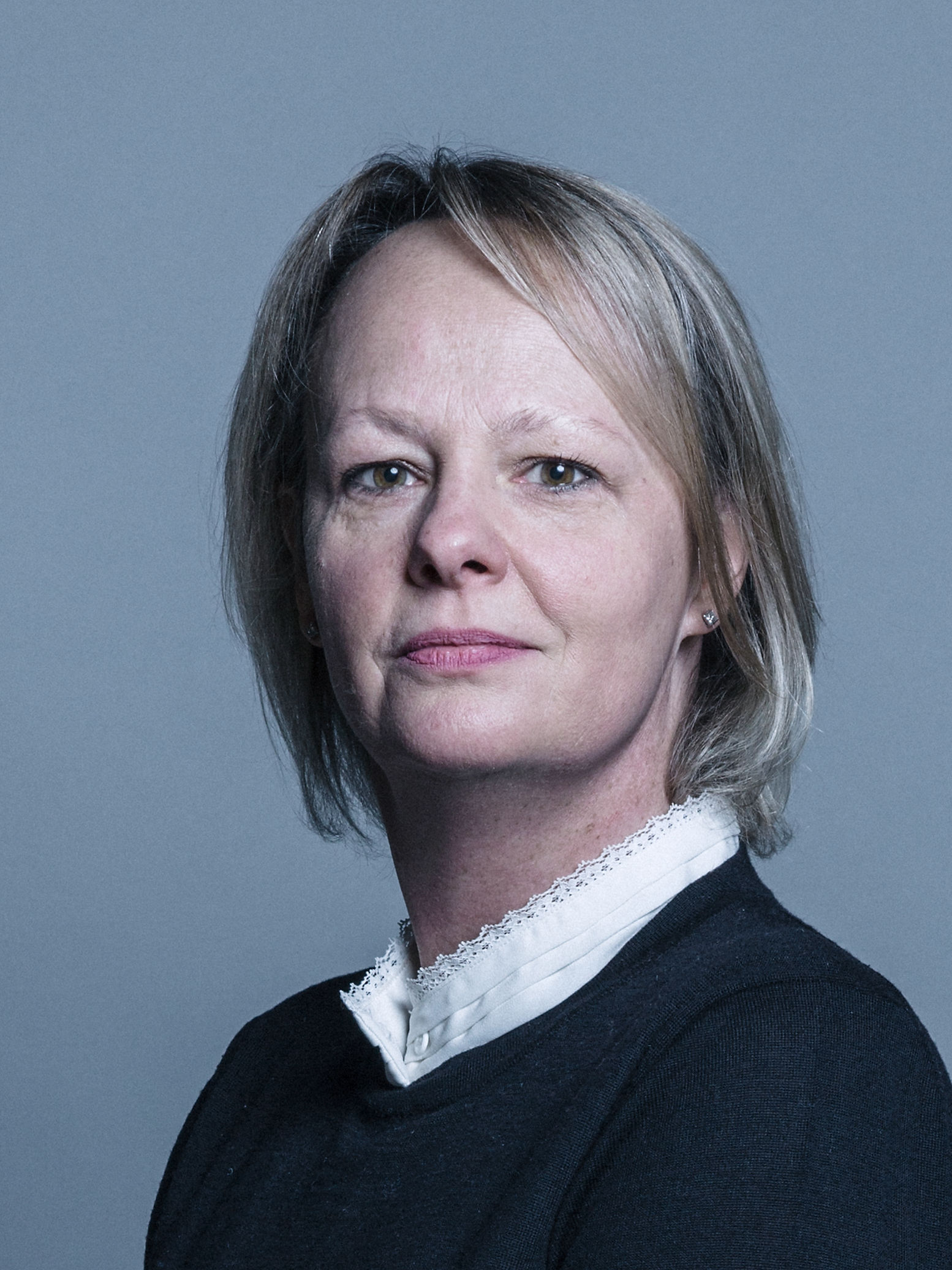

Member of the House of Lords
- Lord Temporal
- Life peerage 15 October 2015

Personal details
- Born: 9 October 1968 (age 58)

Kate Harriet Alexandra Rock, Baroness Rock, DL (born 9 October 1968), is a British Conservative politician and member of the House of Lords. Formerly Vice-Chairman of the Conservative Party with special responsibility for business engagement, she was nominated for a life peerage in August 2015.

== Education ==
Rock was educated at Hanford School, Sherborne School for Girls and Oxford Polytechnic, where she graduated with a BA in publishing and history.

== Business career ==
Between August 2014 and November 2017, Rock served as non-executive director and as chairman of the Remuneration Committee of Imagination Technologies plc (a FTSE 250 high technology company, which was sold to Canyon Bridge Partners).

She also served as a non-executive director of First News (UK) Ltd, a national newspaper for young children, between 2014 and February 2017.

On 1 September 2018 she joined the Board of Keller Group plc (the world's largest provider of geotechnical solutions) and is now the senior independent director, serving on the Audit, Nomination, Remuneration and Health, Safety, Environment and Quality Committees.

In October 2022, it was announced that Rock was appointed Chair of the UK infrastructure company Costain Group.

In April 2026, Rock was appointed as Senior Independent Director of Chemring Group plc.

== Public service ==
Between 2015 and 2016 Rock served as Vice-Chairman of the Conservative Party with special responsibility for business engagement.

She was created Baroness Rock, of Stratton in the County of Dorset on 15 October 2015.

In 2016/2017 she was a Visiting Parliamentary Fellow of St Antony's College, Oxford.

Between 2017 and 2018 she was a member of the House of Lords Select Committee on Artificial Intelligence and since 2019 she has sat on the House of Lords Select Committee on Science and Technology. She has also served since May 2018 as a member of the House of Lords Select Committee on the Rural Economy.

In November 2018 she was appointed as a founding board member of the Centre for Data Ethics and Innovation, an advisory body set up by the UK Government to seek to maximise the benefits of data-enabled technologies, including artificial intelligence.

She is a founding Ambassador of “Women Supporting Women”, a group at The Prince's Trust committed to changing the lives of young women, and was a member of The Prince's Trust's Philanthropy Advisory Board.

In March 2021 Rock was appointed as a Director and Trustee of The Royal Countryside Fund, which was founded by HM King Charles III.

In February 2022 Rock was appointed as Chair of The Tenancy Working Group, commissioned by the Secretary of State for DEFRA to look at the future of agricultural tenancies. The Rock Review, with recommendations to Government, was published in October 2022.

Rock was appointed a deputy lieutenant of Dorset in November 2023.

== Personal life ==
Her husband Caspar Rock is Chief Investment Officer at Cazenove Capital Management, the wealth management arm of Schroders in the UK, Channel Islands and Asia.
