= The Frank Skinner Show =

British television series (1995–2005)

- Genre: Comedy
- Presented by: Frank Skinner
- Country of origin: United Kingdom
- Original language: English
- No. of series: 9
- No. of episodes: 96

Production
- Production location: The London Studios (ITV)
- Running time: 60 minutes
- Production company: Avalon Television

Original release
- Network: BBC One (1995–99); ITV (2000–05)
- Release: 10 September 1995 – 15 December 2005

The Frank Skinner Show is a television chat show hosted by comedian Frank Skinner, which lasted nine series on British television between 1995 and 2005.

As well as celebrity interviews, the shows includes an initial stand-up routine, various sketches throughout the episode and usually concludes with a comedic song featuring Skinner and the guest stars. The Frank Skinner Show became notorious over the years for the unconventional nature of the interviews, including some shocking revelations from the guests.

It was screened on BBC One from its first episode on 10 September 1995 until 3 June 1999.

In 2000, the show moved to ITV. The programme was nominated for a Royal Television Society Award in 2001.

== Series guide ==
=== Series 1 (1995–96) ===
Series No.	Episode No.	Airdate	Guests
1	1	10 September 1995	Charlie Kray, Buzz Aldrin
2	2	17 September 1995	Ivana Trump
3	3	24 September 1995	Bonnie Langford
4	4	1 October 1995	Marvin Hagler
5	5	8 October 1995	Kato Kaelin
6	6	15 October 1995	Myra Gale Brown
Xmas	—N/a	29 December 1996	Tony Blair, Terry Wogan

=== Series 2 (1997–98) ===
Series No.	Episode No.	Airdate	Guests
1	7	2 January 1997	Gene Wilder
2	8	9 January 1997	Ozzy Osbourne
3	9	16 January 1997	Barry Manilow fans
4	10	23 January 1997	Alexander McQueen
5	11	30 January 1997	Michael Palin
6	12	6 February 1997	Thora Hird
Xmas	—N/a	24 December 1998	Melanie C, Gennifer Flowers, Aled Jones

=== Series 3 (1999) ===
Series No.	Episode No.	Airdate	Guests
1	13	15 April 1999	Fiona Allen, Nick Moran
2	14	22 April 1999	Tara Palmer-Tomkinson, Alan Hansen
3	15	29 April 1999	Caroline Aherne, Kenny Rogers
4	16	6 May 1999	Gail Porter, Michael Aspel
5	17	13 May 1999	Dale Winton, Germaine Greer
6	18	20 May 1999	Zoë Ball, Eric Clapton
7	19	27 May 1999	Charlie Dimmock, David Essex
8	20	3 June 1999	Anthea Turner, Martin Kemp

=== Series 4 (2000) ===
Series No.	Episode No.	Airdate	Guests
1	21	2 October 2000	Paul McKenna, Bjork
2	22	9 October 2000	Jamie Oliver, Denise Lewis
3	23	16 October 2000	Debra Stephenson, Max Bygraves
4	24	23 October 2000	Joe Pasquale, Lorraine Kelly
5	25	30 October 2000	Kelly Brook, Fatboy Slim
6	26	6 November 2000	Charlotte Church, Tracey Ullman
7	27	13 November 2000	Samantha Fox, Noel Gallagher
8	28	20 November 2000	David Ginola, Mel C
9	29	27 November 2000	Julie Hesmondhalgh, Richard Wilson
10	30	6 December 2000	Katy Hill, Noddy Holder

=== Series 5 (2001–02) ===
Series No.	Episode No.	Airdate	Guests
1	32	13 October 2001	Gabby Logan, Ant & Dec
2	33	20 October 2001	Bruce Forsyth, Tracy Shaw
3	34	27 October 2001	Bill Wyman, Tara Palmer-Tomkinson
4	35	3 November 2001	Eddie Izzard, Cliff Richard
5	36	11 November 2001	Paul Gascoigne
6	37	18 November 2001	Boy George, Jordan
7	38	25 November 2001	Sean Bean, Simon Cowell
8	39	2 December 2001	Ulrika Jonsson, Charlotte Church
9	40	9 December 2001	Johnny Vegas, Dido
10	41	16 December 2001	Myleene Klass, Kym Marsh, Suzanne Shaw, Steve Coogan
11	42	26 December 2001	Vinnie Jones, Nicky Byrne, Brian McFadden
12	43	26 January 2002	Britney Spears

=== Series 6 (2002) ===
Series No.	Episode No.	Airdate	Guests
1	44	10 September 2002	Kyle MacLachlan, Dave Gorman, Will Young
2	45	17 September 2002	Rhona Cameron, Geri Halliwell
3	46	24 September 2002	Andrew Lloyd Webber, Alison Moyet, Chris Tarrant
4	47	1 October 2002	Tara Palmer-Tomkinson, Brenda Blethyn, LL Cool J
5	48	8 October 2002	Ian Thorpe, Dolly Parton, Natalie & Nicole Appleton
6	49	15 October 2002	Charles Kennedy, Ronan Keating, Pamela Anderson
7	50	22 October 2002	Samuel L. Jackson, Rachael Stirling, Myleene Klass
8	51	29 October 2002	Robin Gibb, Martine McCutcheon, Harry Hill
9	52	5 November 2002	Heidi Klum, Vinnie Jones, Atomic Kitten
10	53	12 November 2002	George Foreman, Moby, Elton John
11	54	26 November 2002	Chandeep Uppal, David Dickinson, Sophie Ellis-Bextor
12	55	3 December 2002	Carol Vorderman, Jack Ryder, Renée Zellweger, Richard Gere

=== Series 7 (2003) ===
Series No.	Episode No.	Airdate	Guests
1	56	6 October 2003	Jordan, Blue, Francesca Martinez
2	57	13 October 2003	Hilary Duff, Elvis Costello, Sally Lindsay
3	58	20 October 2003	Al Murray, Kym Marsh, Myleene Klass, Phil Taylor
4	59	27 October 2003	Helen Mirren, Matthew Kelly, Frank Maloney
5	60	3 November 2003	Kelly Osbourne, Helen Fielding, Brian and Kerry McFadden
6	61	14 November 2003	Michael Moore, Robert Downey Jr., Michael Stipe
7	62	17 November 2003	Johnny Vegas, David Seaman, Cheryl Tweedy, Kimberley Walsh
8	63	24 November 2003	Ron Jeremy, Brenda Blethyn, Mo Mowlam
9	64	1 December 2003	Martin Johnson, Will Greenwood, James Bourne, Matt Jay
10	65	8 December 2003	Justin Hawkins, Fern Britton, Phillip Schofield, Hayley Westenra
11	66	15 December 2003	Jamie Lee Curtis, Jamie Oliver, Fran Healy, Dougie Payne
12	67	22 December 2003	Jasper Carrott, Rosanna Davison, Dave Gorman

=== Series 8 (2004) ===
Series No.	Episode No.	Airdate	Guests
1	68	14 October 2004	Richard Dreyfuss, La Toya Jackson, Har Mar Superstar
2	69	21 October 2004	Pamela Anderson, Graham Coxon, Stan Collymore
3	70	28 October 2004	Jamelia, Franz Ferdinand, Brian McFadden
4	71	4 November 2004	Kathy Burke, Rufus Wainwright, George Best
5	72	11 November 2004	Paula Radcliffe, Ron Atkinson, Joss Stone
6	73	18 November 2004	Shania Twain, Ronnie O'Sullivan, Peter Andre, Jordan, Snow Patrol
7	74	25 November 2004	Michael Parkinson, Shane MacGowan, Goldie Lookin Chain, Status Quo
8	75	2 December 2004	Kelly Brook, Simon Callow, Jools Holland, Tom Jones
9	76	9 December 2004	Leigh Francis, Davina McCall, Morrissey
10	77	16 December 2004	Amanda Holden, Paul Burrell, Frank Lampard, Kasabian
11	78	23 December 2004	Jo Brand, David Coulthard, Patrick Stewart, Embrace

=== Series 9 (2005) ===
Series No.	Episode No.	Airdate	Guests
1	79	29 September 2005	Andrew Flintoff, Jon Bon Jovi, Danny Jones, t.A.T.u
2	80	6 October 2005	James Nesbitt, Ringo Starr, Jo Brand
3	81	13 October 2005	Gene Simmons, Craig David, The Cheeky Girls, Omid Djalili
4	82	20 October 2005	Ryan Giggs, Backstreet Boys, McFly
5	83	27 October 2005	George Galloway, Terry Gilliam, Zoë Ball
6	84	3 November 2005	Alice Cooper, Lee Mack, Sheryl Crow
7	85	10 November 2005	Ozzy Osbourne, Kevin Bacon, Tommy Lee
8	86	17 November 2005	Roy 'Chubby' Brown, Carol Vorderman, Sugababes
9	87	24 November 2005	Steve Irwin, Rory Bremner, Nigel Harman
10	88	1 December 2005	John McEnroe, Westlife, David Mitchell, Robert Webb
11	89	8 December 2005	Gary Lineker, Al Murray, Jamie Bell
12	90	15 December 2005	Carol Thatcher, Mel Brooks, Girls Aloud
