= Swiss Guatemalan =

Swiss Guatemalan Suizo-guatemalteco
- (Switzerland) (Guatemala)

Regions with significant populations
- Guatemala City, Quetzaltenango

Languages
- Spanish and French (minority) German

Religion
- Roman Catholicism and Lutheranism

Related ethnic groups
- Swiss people, Swiss diaspora

A Swiss Guatemalan is a Guatemalan of Swiss heritage, hailing from the waves of immigration that began in the 19th century. The Swiss often came simultaneously with expatriates from Belgium and Germany during the first period of immigration in the 1840s, with many arriving as chartered settlers.

== History ==
The history of the Swiss in Guatemala dates back to the 19th century, with the first wave of immigration culminating in the Swiss government opening a consulate in 1891. The majority of immigrants from this first wave originated from Geneva and settled primarily in Guatemala City, with some additional settlement in the surrounding highlands. Switzerland and Guatemala have sustained a committed trade partnership that began during this time period. Guatemala drew a second wave of European immigrants to the city of Quetzaltenango, many of them Swiss, following the construction of the Ferrocarril de los Altos (Railway of the high lands) and the establishment of the coffee plantation system in the early 20th century.

== Culture ==
On July 24, 2014, the Swiss Ambassador to Guatemala, Jürg Benz, and the Swiss embassy in Guatemala, celebrated 123 years of diplomatic relations have as much as trade between the two countries, mentioned above the country opened its consul since 1891. By the 19th century, the Swiss immigrants boosted the chocolate manufacture in Guatemala. Swiss immigrants have also left descendants in the nation, and living mostly in Guatemala City, in Quetzaltenango there are Native Indigenous Guatemalans with Swiss features due to a mixtures between Kakchiquel Native Guatemalans and Swiss immigrants.

=== Notable Swiss Guatemalans ===
- Jacobo Árbenz
- Eduardo Suger
- Fritz García Gallont
- Carlos Lopez-Barillas
