= Eric Doeringer =

American artist (born 1974)

Eric Doeringer (born July 1, 1974) is an American artist currently living and working in Los Angeles, California. He graduated from Brown University in 1996 with a B.A. and received an MFA from the School of the Museum of Fine Arts, Boston in 1999.

== "Bootleg" paintings ==
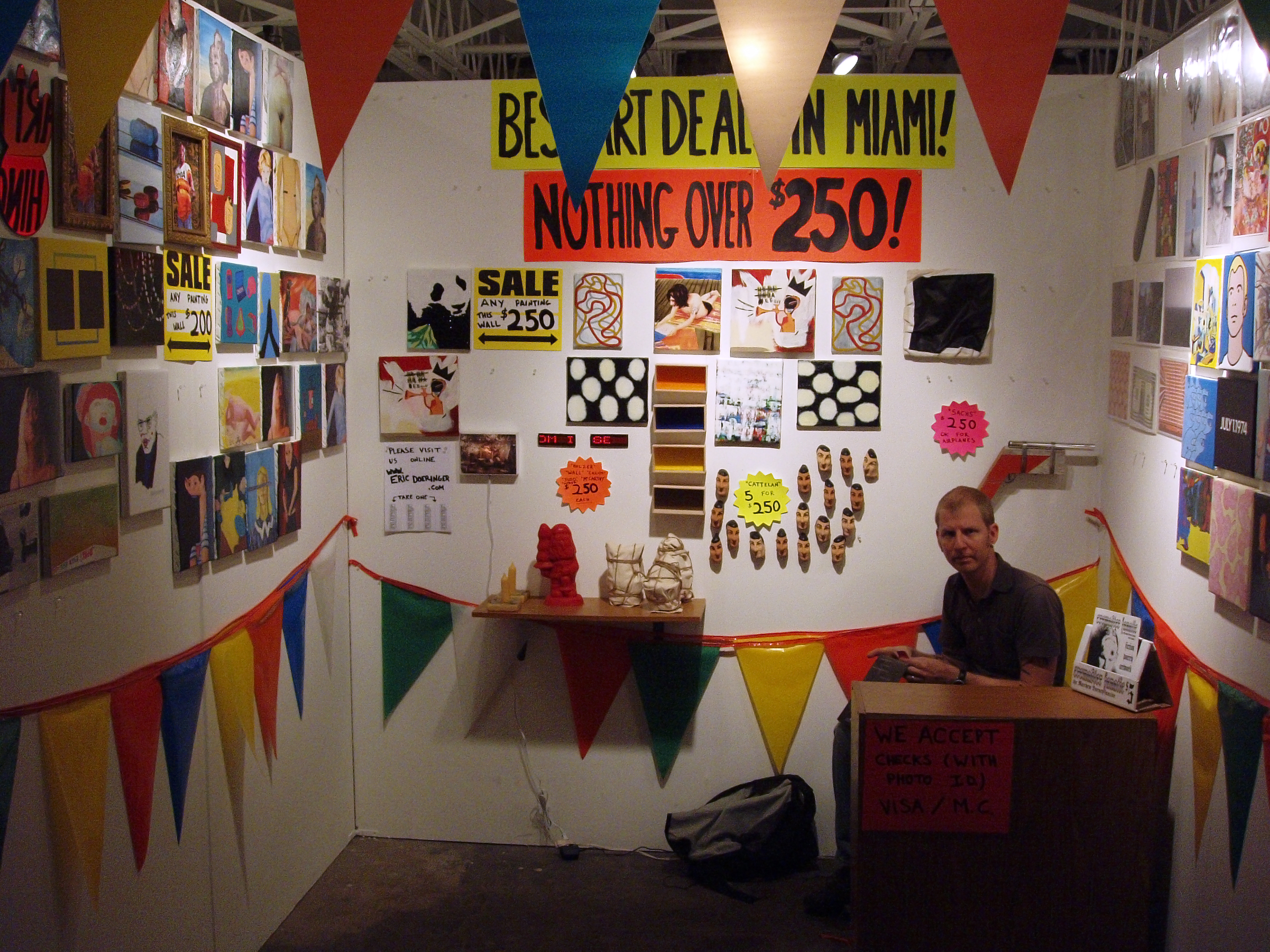
Eric Doeringer's bootleg stand at the Geisai Art Fair in Miami in 2007

[Doeringer] has come under some opposition for his stance on [copying pictures] and has received more than one cease-and-desist order from galleries and artists, but has also received praise for his activities with purchases from a few of the artists he appropriated. Viewers seem to be split, calling him either a pirate or a virtuoso.

— Reading Eagle, April 13, 2008

Eric Doeringer's "Bootlegs" are small copies of work by eminent contemporary artists including Richard Prince and Lisa Yuskavage. Doeringer reproduces the artworks using "collage, digital photography, paint and varnish". Doeringer can make between six and fifteen paintings each day and told The New York Times in a 2005 interview that his process is "like an assembly line". On Saturdays beginning in 2001, he set up a vending table in Chelsea, Manhattan on West 24th Street. Small canvases reproducing contemporary paintings lined the table. Paintings by the original artists (sold within a short walking distance from Doeringer's stand) cost tens of thousands of dollars, while Doeringer's copies sold for less than $100. His total profit in a day of selling paintings has sometimes reached $1500. Time Out stated that Doeringer is "famous for bootlegging art on the streets of New York".

According to Doeringer, the majority of the artists he copies do not mind, while others have sent him cease-and-desist letters. Richard Prince was a "fan" of his work, while Takashi Murakami put a stop to his copies. Doeringer states that his work is fair use because he "culled the pictures from the public domain of the Internet". In 2005, Chelsea art dealer Mike Weiss called the police to remove Doeringer's Bootleg stand from 24th Street. Weiss told The New York Times that "he did so for reasons that might be condemned in the art world but that made perfect sense for any businessman like himself who has to pay a huge rent" and claimed Doeringer was "an opportunist and that he just wants his 15 minutes".

In 2007, Doeringer sold his wares in the Geisai Art Fair in Miami. For the fair, he crafted 42-cent stamps decorated with pictures of celebrities. The stamps, which cost $1, were legally usable as postage and were decorated with photographs of eminent people in the art world. Over his booth, Doeringer placed orange and neon signs that proclaimed "Best Art Deals in Miami" and "Nothing Over $250!" The New York Sun deemed his decorations "a pitch-perfect metamockery of the art fair's commercialism".

== Conceptual art recreations ==
In 2008, Doeringer began making larger, more faithful recreations of works of Conceptual art by artists like Sol LeWitt, Lawrence Weiner, Edward Ruscha, and On Kawara. New York magazine called a 2009 exhibition of Doeringer's Sol LeWitt Wall Drawings "perfectly executed" and "a genuine aesthetic experience, not just a knowing scold."

In 2011, Doeringer exhibited his work at Another Year in L.A.; he titled his exhibition "Eastern Standard Time". In one piece, Doeringer copied Charles Ray's 1973 avant-garde photograph panorama All My Clothes. Titled All My Clothes (After Charles Ray), Doeringer's photographs each contain himself standing in front of a white background attired in various clothes. In an interview with the LA Weekly, he said he adapted Ray's general ideas for the artwork, adding that the key distinction between their works is the "East Coast-West Coast divide". Whereas Ray's figure is garbed in a single winter outfit, Doeringer's wears much toastier clothing. Other pieces Doeringer copied and showcased at the Los Angeles exhibition were John Baldessari's Throwing Three Balls in the Air to Get a Straight Line, On Kawara's I Went, Richard Prince's Cowboy photographs, and several of Edward Ruscha's books.

In 2012, The New York Times art critic Ken Johnson reviewed Doeringer's solo exhibition at the Mulherin + Pollard gallery titled "The Rematerialization of the Art Object". In the front room, Doeringer displayed "well-made simulations" of Damien Hirst's spot paintings and Richard Prince's Marlboro cowboy advertisements. In the back room, Doeringer presented imitations of three artists: Edward Ruscha (counterfeit books), Charles Ray (16 photographs of himself wearing various clothes in imitation of Ray's All My Clothes), and Andy Warhol (a film mimicking Warhol's Empire by recording the Empire State Building). Johnson wrote that Doeringer's "distinction is his focus not on canonical works of Modernism but on famous Conceptualist pieces that are themselves art about art". In 2013, the Toronto Star's Murray Whyte reviewed Doeringer's Survey, "a series of his exacting knock-offs of the late 20th century's greatest art hits". In addition to containing imitations of works by Damien Hirst, Richard Prince, and Andy Warhol, the exhibition also contained imitations of Sol LeWitt's wall drawings and Lawrence Weiner's spray paintings. Art critic Murray Whyte wrote that Doeringer is "less heretic than prophet, putting the towering genius of a previous generation to its own test".
