= Sonia King =

Sonia King (born 1953) is a mosaic artist, author and educator with studios in Dallas, Texas and San Francisco, California. She creates one-of-a-kind, fine art mosaics for gallery, architectural and residential settings. Her award-winning art is exhibited nationally and internationally and represented in private, public and corporate collections. King's mosaic, Depthfinder, has been acquired by Italy's Museo d’Arte della Città di Ravenna and will go into its permanent collection." Sonia King is "the first American to be included in the Italian museum's world-class contemporary mosaic collection."

Nebula Chroma is a mosaic mural for the new main lobby of Children's Medical Center of Dallas, which won a second international Spectrum Award for King's creative use of tile. Nebula Chroma was selected for exhibition at RavennaMosaico, the First International Festival of Contemporary Mosaic in Ravenna, Italy. Another mosaic installation, Nebula Aqua, was awarded special recognition in the 2010 International Prize for Mosaic Art and Architecture by the Exhibition Commission in Italy. Sonia King is currently creating VisionShift, a site-specific mosaic installation for Hall Arts Plaza in the Dallas Arts District.

== Biography ==
King creates contemporary, abstract mosaic art with a complex variety of tesserae, working with spacing, reflectivity and texture. The rich surface offers continued visual interest as new relationships are noticed even after extensive viewing. All the pieces are cut by hand, without power tools. While some large scale installations (like Nebula Chroma) are grouted using a multi-colored 'fresco grout' technique that King developed, her fine art mosaics are not grouted. This allows each tessera to retain its own identity, revealing more by emphasizing shadows and negative space. "Mosaic is hard. Art is harder. Creating with a broad range of materials raises the complexity beyond just cutting a piece to fit. I work to get every tessera right while managing its relationship to the next piece and the one before, all the time considering the work as a whole. Unlimited choices in scale and texture and reflectivity and spacing and more, keep my mind working on multiple levels at the same time."

Sonia King is a founding member and past-President of the Society of American Mosaic Artists and serves as a Vice President of the Associazione Internazionale Mosaicisti Contemporanei (AIMC) in Ravenna, Italy. She is instructor in mosaic at the Creative Arts Center of Dallas, a Senior Tutor at West Dean College in England and teaches master classes internationally in locations ranging from France, New Zealand, Tunisia, Turkey and Greece. King has spoken on mosaic art in England, France, Australia, Brazil, Macedonia, Turkey and Italy. King was featured on HGTV's popular show, Modern Masters, and in numerous books. She is the author of the bestselling book "Mosaic Techniques & Traditions" from Sterling Publishing and is currently co-authoring Mosaic Master Class: The Advanced Techniques with English mosaic artist Emma Biggs.

Sonia King received a Bachelor of Fine Arts (BFA) degree from the California College of Arts and later a Master of Business Administration (MBA) from Southern Methodist University.

"The extraordinary thing about Sonia King's work is her ability to create homogeny without sacrificing the individuality of her materials. Each segment is uniquely alluring, but when assembled together becomes an engaging masterpiece."

== Publications ==
- Dawson, D.T. The New Mosaic, Lark Press, USA; 1999. ISBN 1-57990-138-7
- de Melo, M. The Interstitial Knowledge of Sonia King’s Coded Messages In: Mosaïque Magazine, France. n.23, 2022
- Fishman, George. American Mosaics and Contemporary Art Themes in MOSAIC, Mosaic Art Assoc. in Japan; November Vol.9, 2004
- Goodwin, Elaine M. Encyclopedia of Mosaic, Batsford LTD, UK; 2003 ISBN 0-7134-8777-1
- Goodwin, Elaine M. Mosaic Today, Trafalgar Square, UK; 2003. ISBN 1-57076-399-2
- Gravier, Tracy. Crazy Mosaic, Laurel Glen Publishing, USA; 2000. ISBN 1-57145-655-4
- Hammer, Brit. Mosaic: Finding Your Own Voice, Blurb, USA; 2008. ISBN 978-90-812669-4-9
- Hunkin, Tessa. Modern Mosaic. Firefly Books, UK; 2003. ISBN 1-55297-701-3
- Kelly, Sarah. The Complete Mosaic Handbook. Firefly Books, USA; 2008. ISBN 1-55297-774-9
- King, Sonia. Mosaic Techniques and Traditions, Sterling Publishing, USA; Hardback: 2003 ISBN 0-8069-7577-6. Paperback: 2006 ISBN 1-4027-4061-1
- Locktov, JoAnn and Mastandrea, Doreen. Mosaic Sourcebook, Rockport Publishers, USA; 2004. ISBN 1-59223-216-7
- Locktov, JoAnn. Mosaic Art and Style. Rockport Publishers, USA; 2005. ISBN 1-59253-145-8
- Macquaire, P. Mosaique en Movement, Association les 3 R, France; 2002. ISBN 2-9514318-2-1
- Mastandrea, Doreen. Mosaics Inside and Out, Quarry, USA; 2001. ISBN 1-56496-742-5
- Weitenberg, G. & de Melo, M. De Kunst van het Mozaieken. Forte Uitgavers BV: The Netherlands, 2010. ISBN 90-5877-739-1
- Vallee, Nicole. Dallas Soars, Taylor Publishing, USA; 2001 ISBN 0-615-11975-1
- Yee, Roger. Healthcare Spaces No.2, Visual Reference Publications, USA; 2004. ISBN 1-58471-045-4

== Sources ==
- American Lifestyle Magazine, Finding Peace in the Pieces: Art of Sonia King, February/March 2007
- Grout, Unexpected Juxtapositions: The Art of Sonia King, British Association for Modern Mosaic, No.28 Winter 2009
- LUXE Magazine, Piecing It Together: Sonia King; Vol.7 No.3 Summer 2009
- Society of American Mosaic Artists: History
- Mosaic Matters: Spectrum Award
- HGTV's Modern Masters
- American Craft Magazine, "Souvenirs of a Journey"; June/July 2013
- Dallas Morning News, "Dallas mosaic artist collects two big honors"; May 18, 2013
- Mosaic Art Now, "Sonia King’s Milestones", May 18, 2013
