= Robert Tomkinson =

English cricketer and British Army officer

Personal information
- Full name: Robert Edward Tomkinson
- Born: 14 August 1847; Willington, Cheshire, England
- Died: 27 July 1928 (aged 80); Burnham-on-Sea, Somerset, England
- Batting: Right-handed
- Relatives: James Palmer-Tomkinson (nephew)

Domestic team information
- Years: Team
- 1873: Marylebone Cricket Club

Career statistics
Competition	First-class
Matches	3
Runs scored	81
Batting average	16.20
100s/50s	–/1
Top score	52
Catches/stumpings	3/–
- Source: Cricinfo, 13 September 2021

Robert Edward Tomkinson (14 August 1847 — 27 July 1928) was an English first-class cricketer and stockbroker.

The son of William Tomkinson, he was born at Willington Hall in Cheshire in August 1847. He was educated at Marlborough College, before going up to Trinity Hall, Cambridge. After graduating from Cambridge, he became a stockbroker. Tomkinson later played three first-class cricket matches for the Marylebone Cricket Club in 1873 against Cambridge University, Oxford University and the Surrey Club. He scored 81 runs in this three matches, scoring 52 runs against the Surrey Club at The Oval. The following year he married Lucille Diana Mauritia, the daughter of Major-General Thomas Brooke. Tomkinson was convicted in Berkhamsted of carrying a gun and killing partridges without having a licence in December 1888. He died at Burnham-on-Sea in July 1928.
