= Hanford, Dorset =

Village and civil parish in Dorset, England

Coordinates: 50.902493°N 2.2217440°W

Hanford
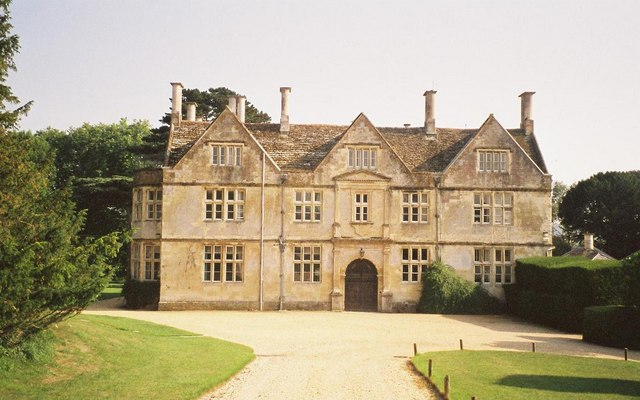
- Hanford School

- Location within Dorset
- Population: 154 (2001)
- Civil parish: Hanford
- Unitary authority: Dorset
- Ceremonial county: Dorset
- Region: South West
- Country: England
- Sovereign state: United Kingdom
- Post town: Blandford Forum
- Postcode district: DT11

Hanford is a village and civil parish in the unitary authority area of Dorset, in the English ceremonial county of Dorset. The parish had 154 inhabitants in 2001.
