= Sherborne School for Girls =

Girls' day/boarding school, Sherborne, Dorset, England

Sherborne Girls

Location
- Bradford Rd; Sherborne, Dorset, DT9 3QN; England; 50.948°N 2.528°W

Information
- Type: Private day and boarding school
- Motto: μεγάλη καλόν τό άθλον καὶ ἡ ἐλπὶς (The prize is a fair one and the hope great)
- Religious affiliation: Church of England
- Established: 1899
- Founders: John and Charlotte Wingfield Digby
- Department for Education URN: 113919 Tables
- Head: Ruth Sullivan
- Gender: Girls
- Age: 11 to 18
- Enrolment: 485
- Houses: 7
- Former pupils: Old Girls
- Website: www.sherborne.com

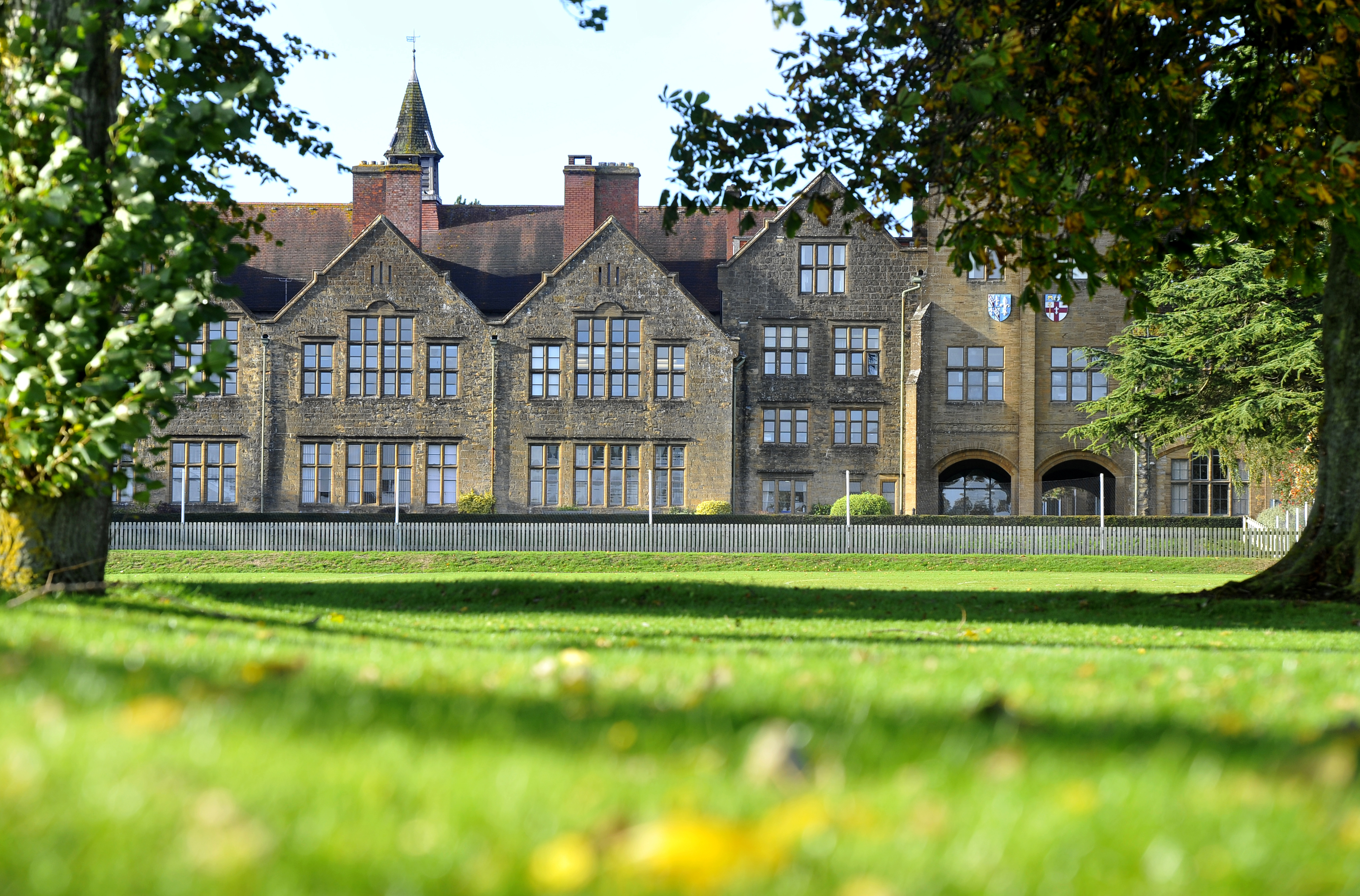
Sherborne Girls main school building

Sherborne Girls, also known as Sherborne School for Girls, is an independent day and boarding school for girls, located in Sherborne, North Dorset, England. There were 485 pupils attending in 2019–2020, with more than 90 per cent of them living on campus in the seven boarding houses. Recognition for Sherborne Girls has included a double "excellent" rating in its Independent Schools Inspectorate Report.

== Curriculum ==
The school, founded in 1899 by John and Charlotte Wingfield Digby, requires all girls to take English, maths, a science subject, religion and a foreign language. Most girls take nine or ten GCSEs and three or four A-Level subjects. Sherborne Girls previously offered the International Baccalaureate programme.

Some subjects at AS/A-Level are taught jointly with Sherborne School for boys, under a cooperation scheme. Both also collaborate in activities and functions such as theatre productions, specialist societies and social activities.

== Facilities ==
The campus includes Oxley Sports Centre, which opened in 2007, with a swimming-pool, a fitness suite, squash courts, badminton courts, a floodlit AstroTurf hockey pitch, a climbing-wall, a bouldering-wall, grass pitches and dance studio.

== Notable alumnae ==
- Maria Aitken (born 1945), writer, producer and director
- Leonora Anson, Countess of Lichfield (born 1949)
- Camila Batmanghelidjh CBE (1963–2024), psychotherapist, founder and Director of Kids Company
- Rosa Beddington (1956–2001), biologist
- Nina Coltart (1927–1997), psychoanalyst and psychotherapist
- Jane Cornwell (1938–2021), book editor
- Margaret Dix (1902–1991), neurologist
- Princess Elizabeth of Toro (born 1936), Ugandan lawyer and politician
- Diana Reader Harris (1912–1996), educator and public figure
- Princess Rahma bint Hassan (born 1969), Jordanian educator
- Princess Sumaya bint Hassan (born 1971), Jordanian science activist
- Deirdre Hutton DBE (born 1949), public servant
- Rajkumari Amrit Kaur (1889–1964), Indian cabinet minister
- Diana Keppel, Countess of Albemarle DBE (1909–2013), youth and development activist
- Sophie Kinsella (Madeleine Sophie Townley), (born 1969), author
- Emma Kirkby DBE, (born 1949) early-music soprano
- Mary Lascelles (1900–1995), literary scholar
- Melanie McFadyean (1950–2023), journalist and lecturer
- Margaret Macmillan (born 1953), University of Oxford academic
- Santa Montefiore (born 1970), author
- Daphne Oram (1925–2003), composer and electronic musician
- Tara Palmer-Tomkinson (1971–2017), television personality
- E. Arnot Robertson (1903–1961), novelist, critic and broadcaster
- Kate Rock, Baroness Rock (born 1968), politician
- Winifred Spooner (1900–1933), aviator
- Juliet Wheldon DCB, QC (1950–2013), civil servant
