= Jeremy Palmer-Tomkinson =

British skier (born 1943)

Jeremy James Palmer-Tomkinson (born 4 November 1943) is a British former skier who competed at the Winter Olympics in 1968, 1972, 1976, and 1980.

He was born in Henley-on-Thames. His father, James and brother, Charles, were also Olympians, while his nieces, Santa Montefiore is a novelist and Tara Palmer-Tomkinson was a socialite and television personality.
