= Santa Montefiore =

British author (born 1970)

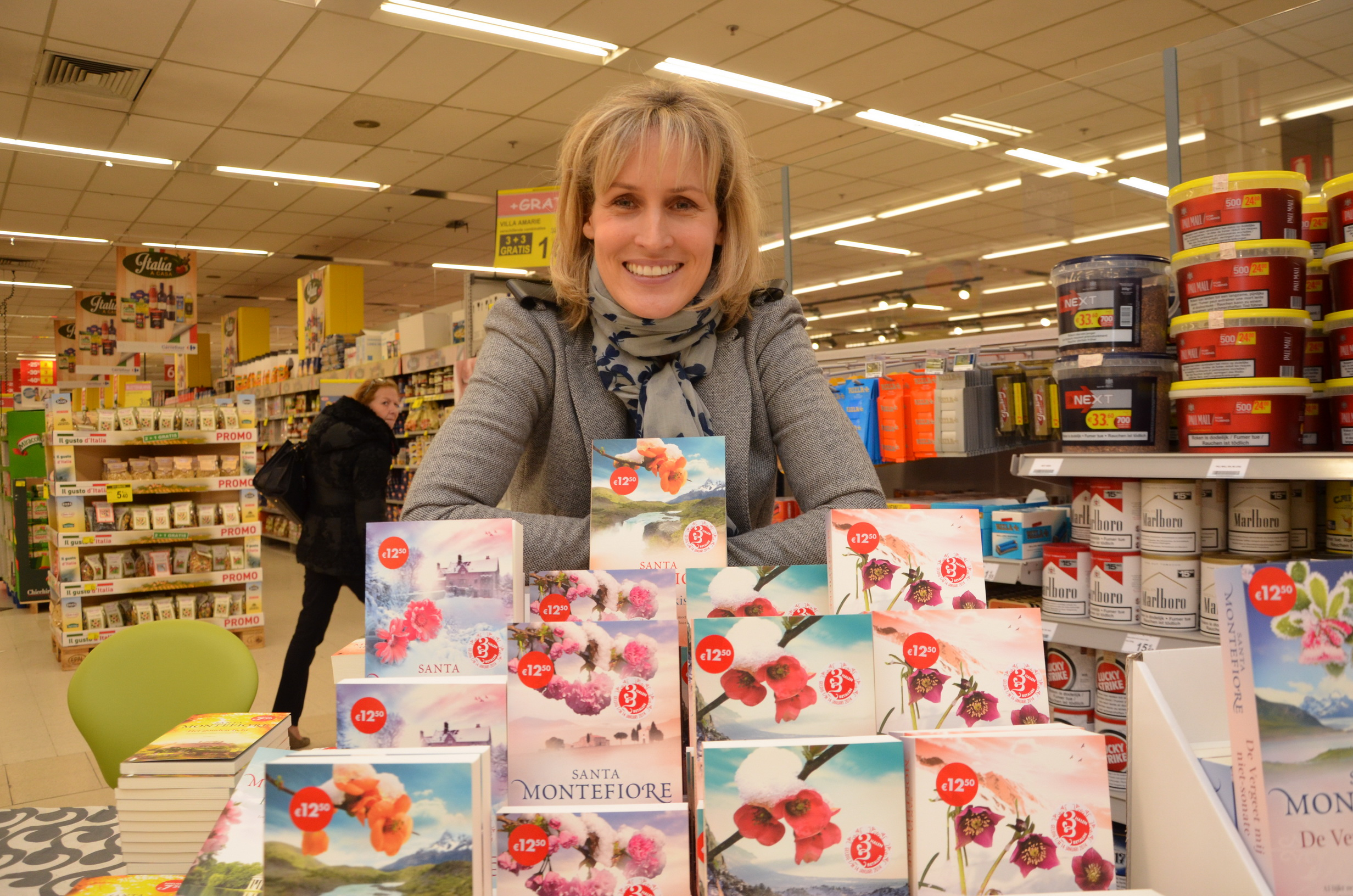
- Montefiore in 2013
- Born: Santa Palmer-Tomkinson; 2 February 1970 (age 56); Winchester, Hampshire, England
- Education: Hanford School; Sherborne School for Girls
- Alma mater: Exeter University
- Occupation: Author
- Spouse: Simon Sebag Montefiore
- Children: 2
- Father: Charles Palmer-Tomkinson
- Relatives: Tara Palmer-Tomkinson (sister); Jeremy Palmer-Tomkinson (uncle)
- Website: santamontefiore.co.uk

Santa Montefiore (née Palmer-Tomkinson; born 2 February 1970) is a British author.

== Early life ==
Santa Montefiore was born Santa Palmer-Tomkinson on 2 February 1970 in Winchester. Her parents are Charles Palmer-Tomkinson, formerly High Sheriff of Hampshire, and Patricia Palmer-Tomkinson (née Dawson), of Anglo-Argentine background. The Palmer-Tomkinson family are substantial land-owners in Hampshire and Leicestershire.

Her sister, Tara Palmer-Tomkinson, was known as a socialite and charity patron.

Santa Montefiore said that growing up on the family farm gave her an "idyllic Swallows and Amazons childhood". She also describes her upbringing as "sheltered, Sloaney". She was educated at the Hanford School from the age of eight to twelve. She then attended Sherborne School for Girls in Dorset. She studied Spanish and Italian at Exeter University.

== Career ==
Prior to publishing any novels, she worked in London, first in public relations for the outfitters Swaine Adeney and later for the jeweller Theo Fennell. She also worked as a shop assistant in Farmacia Santa Maria Novella, the perfumery, and in events for Ralph Lauren.

She sent her first manuscript to several literary agents, using a pen name in order to distance herself from her sister. Only one agent, Jo Frank of A P Watt, expressed an interest, but this led to a bidding war between several publishers, with Hodder & Stoughton giving her a six-figure advance. Montefiore has published at least one novel a year since 2001. Four of her books are set in Argentina, where she spent 1989 as a gap year teaching English. Her books have been characterised as "beach-read blockbusters", selling over eight million copies in 25 translations.

She counts as her literary influences The Count of Monte Cristo by Alexandre Dumas; House of Mirth by Edith Wharton; Gabriel Garcia Márquez, Mary Wesley, Eckhart Tolle, and Daphne du Maurier. Isabel Allende is important to her too.

She has co-written with her husband a series of children's books called The Royal Rabbits of London, which is published by Simon & Schuster.

== Personal life ==
Montefiore is married to the writer and historian Simon Sebag Montefiore. They were brought together by the historian Andrew Roberts, who thought "they would be absolutely perfect for each other because they were the only two people he knew who could remember the words to Evita off by heart". She says of their marriage:

Sebag and I do bring out the best in each other. I wouldn’t have written if not for him and he might not have written books either, as he was a ladies' man, always chasing girls, but now his home life is stable and sorted. We write in the same house, in separate offices and he helps me with plots. I think you have to be a team. Laughter is everything. Mr Darcy would have been so boring to live with – you don’t want to live with someone who is smouldering all the time.

The couple are friends with King Charles III and Queen Camilla, who attended their wedding. Santa Montefiore is a friend of Tiggy Legge-Bourke and of Queen Máxima of the Netherlands.

She converted to Judaism before the marriage. The wedding was held at the Liberal Jewish Synagogue in St John's Wood, London, with which her husband's family has been associated for generations.

== Works ==
- Meet Me Under the Ombu Tree (2001) ISBN 0-7089-9333-8
- The Butterfly Box (2002) ISBN 0-7089-9402-4
- The Forget-me-not Sonata (2003) ISBN 0-340-83171-5
- The Swallow and the Hummingbird (2004) ISBN 0-340-83260-6
- The Last Voyage of the Valentina (2005) ISBN 0-340-83087-5
- The Gypsy Madonna (2006) ISBN 0-340-83090-5
- Sea of Lost Love (2007) ISBN 0-340-84046-3
- The French Gardener (2008) ISBN 141654374-0
- The Italian Matchmaker (2009) ISBN 0-340-84055-2
- The Affair (2010) ISBN 1848949367
- The House by the Sea (2011) ISBN 1849831068
- The Summer House (2012) ISBN 1847379273
- Secrets of the Lighthouse (2013) ISBN 1471100952
- A Mother's Love (2013) ISBN 1471128601
- The Beekeeper's Daughter (2014) ISBN 1476735417
- Songs of Love and War (2015) (The first of The Deverill Chronicles) ISBN 1471135845
- Daughters of Castle Deverill (2016) (The second of The Deverill Chronicles) ISBN 9781471135903
- Last Secret of the Deverills (2017) (The third of The Deverill Chronicles) ISBN 9781471135927
- The Temptation of Gracie (2018) ISBN 9781471169588
- The Secret Hours (2019) ISBN 9781471169625 (the fourth of "The Deverill Chronicles")
- Here and Now (2020) ISBN 9781471169694
- Flappy Entertains (2021) ISBN 9781471197031
- The Distant Shores (2021) (The fifth of The Deverill Chronicles) ISBN 9781398500334
- The Kiss (2022)
- Flappy Investigates (2023) ISBN 978-1398510760
- An Italian Girl In Brooklyn (2023) ISBN 978-1471197109
- Wait For Me (2024)
- Shadows In The Moonlight (2025) ISBN 978-1398720008
