= Luka Radojević =

Montenegrin footballer (born 2006)

Personal information
- Date of birth: 2 September 2006 (age 20)
- Place of birth: London, England
- Height: 1.86 m (6 ft 1 in)
- Position: Midfielder

Team information
- Current team: OFK Beograd
- Number: 39

Youth career
- Chelsea
- Brentford
- –2025: QPR
- 2025–: OFK Beograd

Senior career*
| Years | Team | Apps | (Gls) |
| 2025– | OFK Beograd | 0 | (0) |

International career
| 2021 | Montenegro U15 | | |
- * Club domestic league appearances and goals

Luka Radojević (born 2 September 2006) is a professional footballer who plays as a midfielder for OFK Beograd. Born in England, he is a Montenegro youth international.

== Early life ==
Radojević was born on 2 September 2006 in London, England. Born to a Brazilian mother and a Montenegrin father, he is the younger brother of English writer Monika Radojevic.

== Club career ==
As a youth player, Radojević joined the youth academy of English Premier League side Chelsea at the age of six. Following his stint there, he joined the youth academy of English side Brentford.

Subsequently, he joined the youth academy of English side QPR. During the autumn of 2025, he joined the youth academy of Serbian side OFK Beograd.
