= Dairo Vargas Cerquera =

Dairo Vargas Cerquera (born September 6, 1978) is a Colombian-born visual artist known for his abstract and realist paintings that explore memory, identity, and mental well-being. Based in London, Vargas uses art as both a personal practice and a tool for global mental health advocacy.

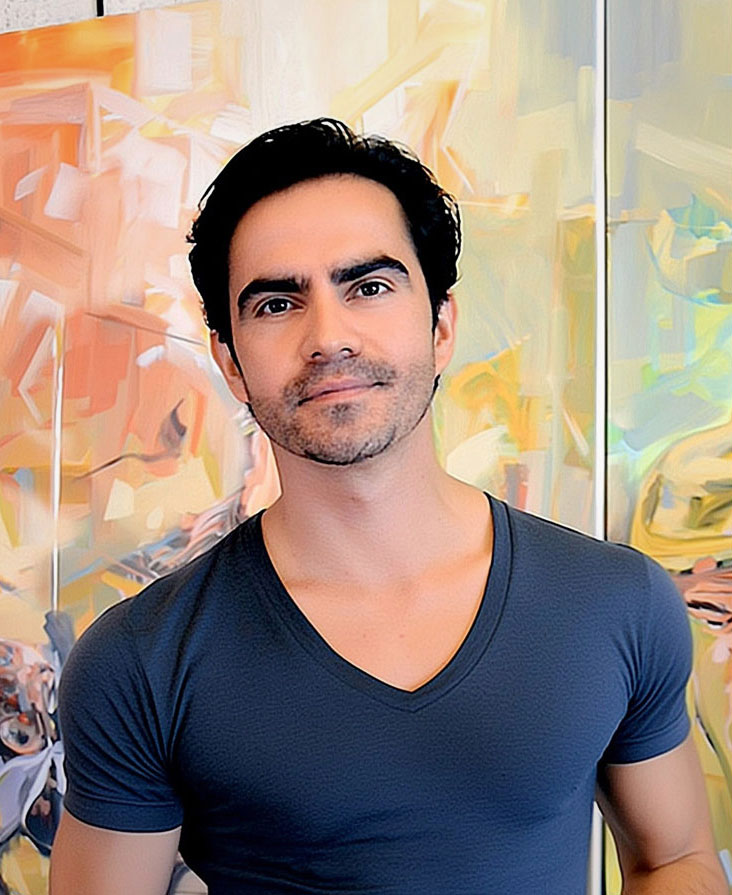
Dairo Vargas at The World Health Organisation (72nd World Health Assembly 2019)

== Early life and education ==
Dairo Vargas was born on September 6, 1978, in Agrado, Huila, Colombia. His appreciation for classical art began during his childhood, when weekly family visits to church exposed him to traditional works of art. At the age of 15, Vargas sold his first painting, and by 16, he had secured commissions for murals.

After completing secondary school in Agrado, Vargas moved to Bogotá to pursue studies in graphic design at Unitec University. While working at advertising agencies like J. Walter Thompson and BBDO, he simultaneously studied art with a private teacher and participated in small exhibitions.

In 2005, Vargas relocated to London to study English and further his artistic ambitions. He pursued a Higher National Certificate (HNC) in Fine Art at Kensington and Chelsea College and completed a summer sculpture course at Central Saint Martins in 2014.

- 2004: BA in Graphic Design, Unitec University, Bogotá, Colombia
- 2008: HNC in Fine Art, Kensington and Chelsea College, London, UK
- 2014: Metal and Sculpture Summer Course, Central Saint Martins, London, UK

== Artistic career ==
Vargas' work addresses themes of feelings, memories, and the sense of self. His signature style blends abstraction with realism, utilising gestural techniques to evoke introspection and capture the layers of memory. Vargas describes his work as a process of reconstructing, distorting, and layering memories, mirroring the way we recall and reinterpret our past. In his own words: *"If our memories give us a sense of moving through time, which of them truly define who we are—and what it means to be alive?"* The BBC reported: The Colombian artist Dairo Vargas uses "flow" techniques to make his abstract-expressionist paintings, some of which were recently displayed at London's Royal Academy of Arts. Vargas champions mental-health awareness, and has found respite from depression in painting. Young children are naturals at "flow", he says, and make art effortlessly and without inhibition.

== Exhibitions and recognition ==
Vargas has exhibited his work internationally. In London he created a mural in Churchill's Wartime HQ and in Dubai took part in Expo 2020.

Solo Exhibitions

- 2025: Coexistent Narratives, Maddox Gallery, London
- 2023-2024: Recall, Maddox Gallery, Gstaad

== Community engagement and mental health advocacy ==
A significant aspect of Vargas' practice involves using art to address mental health and trauma. Through workshops, collaborative projects, and live painting events, Vargas has engaged communities around the world to explore the transformative power of creativity. His work often focuses on individuals experiencing depression, anxiety, trauma, or social and learning disabilities.

== Notable projects ==
- 2018: Global Ministerial Mental Health Summit, London, UK Collaborative painting process involving international delegates, including Catherine, Princess of Wales, and Prince William. - 2018: World Innovation Summit for Health, Doha, Qatar Live painting titled *Father and Son*, highlighting mental health support networks. - 2019: Chora Chori, Kathmandu, Nepal Trauma recovery workshops with rescued children, culminating in an exhibition of their artwork. - 2019: World Health Organization, Geneva, Switzerland Five-day collaborative painting process with attendees to raise awareness of global health issues. - 2021: Wellbeing Workshop, Khabensky Charitable Foundation, Moscow, Russia Conducted workshops for children with brain cancer, in collaboration with The Art Partners and the Russian Impressionism Museum.
