= James Palmer-Tomkinson (cricketer) =

English cricketer

Personal information
- Full name: James Edward Tomkinson
- Born: 11 December 1879; Willington, Cheshire, England
- Died: 14 November 1961 (aged 81); Inkpen, Berkshire, England
- Batting: Unknown
- Relatives: James Tomkinson (father); Robert Tomkinson (uncle)

Career statistics
Competition	First-class
Matches	3
Runs scored	99
Batting average	19.80
100s/50s	–/–
Top score	41
Catches/stumpings	1/–
- Source: Cricinfo, 26 July 2019
- Sports career
Medal record
Men's squash
British Amateur Championships
Gold medal – first place	1926/1927	singles

James Edward Palmer-Tomkinson born James Edward Tomkinson (2 December 1879 – 14 November 1961) was a first-class cricketer and was regarded as Britain's leading squash player in the 1910s and 1920s.

== Biography ==
The son of the politician and landowner James Tomkinson, Palmer-Tomkinson was born at Willington Hall in Willington in December 1879. He was educated at Eton College, before going up to the University of Oxford. He later toured British India with the Oxford University Authentics in 1902–03, making three first-class appearances on the tour against Bombay, the Parsees and the Gentlemen of England. He scored 99 in his three first-class matches, with a high score of 41. He married Marion Lindsay Smith in 1912, and the couple had four children, including the Olympic skier James Algernon Palmer-Tomkinson.

Tomkinson won the British Amateur Squash Championships in December 1926 shortly after his 47th birthday.

His son James died from a skiing accident in 1952 and he died himself in November 1961 at Inkpen, Berkshire.
