= Charles Palmer-Tomkinson =

English landowner and philanthropist, Olympic skier

- Born: Charles Anthony Palmer-Tomkinson; 4 January 1940 (age 86); Hampshire, England
- Occupations: Landowner, philanthropist, socialite
- Spouse: Patricia Dawson
- Children: 3 including: Santa Montefiore; Tara Palmer-Tomkinson
- Parent: James Palmer-Tomkinson

Charles Anthony Palmer-Tomkinson (born 4 January 1940) is an English landowner and philanthropist, a former Olympic skier, and a close friend of King Charles III.

== Landowner ==
The Palmer-Tomkinson family owns substantial lands in Leicestershire, in and around Birstall and Wanlip, having inherited Wanlip Hall. Circa 2001, Palmer-Tomkinson sold some land at Hallam Fields, Birstall, to Jelson Builders for development as homes, schools, and community buildings over the following ten years. In 2010, he donated £1 million to Longslade Community College (as of 2015 The Cedars Academy) to build The Palmer-Tomkinson Centre for post-16-year-old students.

Charles Palmer-Tomkinson owns the 1,200-acre (4.9 km^{2}) Dummer Grange estate near Basingstoke, Hampshire. Major Ronald Ferguson and his younger daughter, Sarah, were close neighbours at the 220-acre (0.89 km^{2}) estate Dummer Down Farm. As of 2006, Palmer-Tomkinson and his wife were living on their Dummer estate.

He was appointed High Sheriff for Hampshire for 1994.

== Olympian ==
Charles Palmer-Tomkinson was a competitor in the 1964 Winter Olympics in the giant slalom and downhill events.

== Royal connection ==
Charles and his wife, Patti (née Patricia Dawson), Palmer-Tomkinson have been close friends of King Charles III, formerly Prince of Wales, since the 1970s. According to tabloid reports, King Charles III became godfather to their younger daughter, Tara, although she is not listed as his godchild in other reports. Charles and Diana visited their home in Birchall in 1986. Palmer-Tomkinson was the then Prince Charles' ski instructor, according to newspaper reports. The Palmer-Tomkinsons frequently accompanied Prince Charles, even after his marriage to Diana, on skiing holidays in Switzerland.

In 1988, Patricia Palmer-Tomkinson was severely injured, and almost died, in a skiing accident that claimed the life of one of their close friends, Major Hugh Lindsay, a royal equerry, as well as injuring Prince Charles. Major Lindsay and Mrs Palmer-Tomkinson were helicoptered to Davos, where he was declared dead and she was found to have severe injuries to both her legs and her lungs. Her life was saved by her Swiss guide giving her mouth-to-mouth resuscitation. She spent four months in a Swiss hospital.

After Charles and Diana separated, the Palmer-Tomkinsons and their children continued to spend holidays with Charles and his family three times a year; in 1994, this royal friendship was instrumental in propelling their younger daughter, Tara, into the public eye. As of 2004, the older Palmer-Tomkinsons continued to ski with the three princes.

== Immediate family ==
Charles Anthony Palmer-Tomkinson is the eldest son and child of James Palmer-Tomkinson, a landowner, who was able to provide a separate house and estate for his elder daughter Jane, Lady Ingram, upon her marriage to a baronet. James was also an Olympian, competing in the 1936 and 1948 Winter Olympic Games. He died, aged 36, in 1952 after a skiing accident.

Charles's younger brother, Christopher (born 1942), is a senior company executive, formerly with Cazenove. Christopher's wife, Virginia Viola Palmer-Tomkinson, is a parish councillor. Christopher's son Dominic works at Highland Gold, where his father is also employed. Highland Gold is part-owned by Millhouse Capital, the investment vehicle of Russian tycoon Roman Abramovich, and part-owned (until 2012) by Barrick Gold, the world's largest gold producer. The latter is a business set up by Peter Munk, a relation by marriage of the Palmer-Tomkinsons.

Another brother, Jeremy (born 4 November 1943), competed in the 1968, 1972, 1976 and 1980 Winter Olympics in various events.

== Family background ==
Charles's father's first cousin was Fortune FitzRoy, Duchess of Grafton, grandmother of the present Duke of Grafton and Mistress of the Robes to Queen Elizabeth II, who was born (Anne) Fortune Smith; through other members of the Smith landed gentry family, the Palmer-Tomkinsons are well-connected to the British aristocracy.

In 1931, Charles's paternal grandfather James Edward Tomkinson inherited Wanlip Hall in Leicestershire from his maternal uncle Sir Archdale Robert Palmer, 4th Baronet, on condition that he added the name of Palmer to his own. James Edward Palmer-Tomkinson (then Tomkinson) married Marion Lindsay Smith, daughter of Lindsay Eric Smith and a second cousin of Queen Elizabeth the Queen Mother (via her Smith paternal grandmother Frances Dora Smith).

The Right Hon. James Tomkinson was a descendant of Lieutenant-Colonel William Tomkinson of Willington Hall (1790–1872).

Charles's cousin is Melanie Munk, second wife of philanthropist and entrepreneur Peter Munk. The Munks are also keen skiers, living part of the year at Klosters.

== Marriage and children ==
Charles Palmer-Tomkinson married Patricia "Patti" Dawson in 1966. Dawson is from an Anglo-Argentine background, born in Argentina, growing up in "the English quarter of Buenos Aires", reading Country Life magazines in the expat Hurlingham Club. She also lived in Chile and Brazil, and had a British boarding school education. The couple met while she was working as a chalet girl in the Swiss resort of Klosters. She is a close friend of Queen Camilla.

The couple have three children, including Santa and Tara.
