= James Palmer-Tomkinson =

British alpine skier (1915–1952)

James Algernon Palmer-Tomkinson (/ˈpɑːmər ˈtɒmkɪnsən/; born James Algernon Tomkinson; 3 April 1915 – 7 January 1952) was a British alpine ski racer who competed in the Winter Olympics in 1936 and 1948. He also competed and won in the Oxford-Cambridge ski race for Oxford, winning in 1935. He was educated at Eton College.

He was the son of James Palmer-Tomkinson, the grandson of James Tomkinson and the father of Charles Palmer-Tomkinson and Jeremy Palmer-Tomkinson, also Winter Olympians. He was a third cousin of Queen Elizabeth II.

At the 1936 Winter Olympics, he finished 14th in the combined, the sole alpine event, at Garmisch, Germany.

Palmer-Tomkinson died at age 36 after a skiing accident in Switzerland.

== See also ==
- List of skiing deaths
