= Tomkinson =

Tomkinson, sometimes spelled Tompkinson, is a surname, derived from the given name Thomas. Rarer spelling variants include Thompkinson, Tonkeson, and Tumkynson.

== Surnames ==
- Amy Louisa Tomkinson (1856–1943), socialite and magistrate in South Australia
- Francis Tomkinson (1883–1963), Cricket player
- Geoffrey Tomkinson (1881–1963), Cricket player
- Henry Tomkinson (1831–1906), English cricketer and rower
- Henry Archdale Tomkinson (1881–1937), British polo champion
- James Tomkinson (1840–1910), British politician and landowner
- Samuel Tomkinson (1816–1900), Australian politician
- Stephen Tompkinson (born 1965), English actor
- Thomas Tomkinson (1631–1710), English Muggletonian writer
- Wilfred Tomkinson (1877–1971), vice-admiral
- William Tomkinson (1790–1872), British Army officer, author of The Diary of a Cavalry Officer: In the Peninsular and Waterloo Campaigns, 1809–1815 (published 1894)

== See also ==
- Palmer-Tomkinson, a British double-barrelled name
- Tomkinson Ranges, Southwest Australia (Named after politician Samuel Tomkinson, 1851–1900)
- Mead & Tomkinson racing, a Herefordshire-base endurance team that developed innovative racing bikes
