= Carlos Lopez-Barillas =

Carlos Lopez-Barillas is a Guatemalan-born photographer, writer and athlete who has been living and working in the United Kingdom since 1990. His work appears regularly in publications like The New York Times, The Philadelphia Inquirer, Boston Globe, Dallas Morning News. His most recent series of work studies the post-conflict Protestant community of Northern Ireland; previous work includes the last ten years of the conflict in Northern Ireland, the Zapatista rebel uprising in the Mexican state of Chiapas, and the armed conflicts in Central America. His work has recently turned more towards the commercial, architecture, landscape and social documentary areas of photography.

== Early life ==
The Lopez-Barillas family is a Guatemalan family with origins in Spain, England, Switzerland, and Luxembourg. Lopez-Barillas' father, Carlos Humberto Lopez y Lopez, was a coffee trade businessman and a professional cycling national and international champion in his youth.

During his earlier years Lopez-Barillas was always active in sports, first while attending San Sebastian school in Guatemala City, a school with a long tradition in athletics. This was the foundation for a lasting sporting career.

Some of the Lopez-Barillas family's notable ancestors are:

Second Great Grandfather Jose Venancio Lopez-Requena second president of the Republic (1842). Jose Venancio was also the first president of the Judicial Courts of Justice and the Supreme Court of the republic.

First Great Grandfather Lucio Lopez, famous landowner who voiced the opposition of the people against President's Rafael Carrera expropriation of communal land program. He was murdered by President Carrera's forces at the patronal house of one of his farms in 1845. A peasant revolt ensued instigated by an armed rebel faction who called themselves "Los Lucios" after the landlord who supported their cause.

The rebels went on a long run of pillaging and plundering throughout much of the east of the country. The revolt came to an end when President Carrera received news that "Los Lucios" were marching towards Guatemala city, camping 30 miles outside the city centre with the intention of taking the city. President Carrera rode to the field where "Los Lucios" were camping and after requesting a truce to dialogue, he met the rebel leaders and promised not to pursue his expropriation program. This successfully ended the revolt.

General Manuel Lisandro Barillas 13th. President of the Republic 1885-1892 Subsequently murdered by President Manuel Estrada Cabrera in 1907 after organizing and supporting an unsuccessful coup attempt against Estrada Cabrera in 1903. He was murdered while in exile in Mexico.

Brigadier General Policarpo Lopez-Pinto (Great-Grandfather) Governor and Chief-Of-Arms of the estates of Chiquimula and Jalapa in East Guatemala during the rule of President Manuel Estrada Cabrera 1898-1906. He was murdered by orders of president Manuel Estrada Cabrera in 1906 after the Head of the Guatemalan Aristocracy The Aycinena Family expressed their support of General Lopez as the preferred choice to succeed Estrada Cabrera in the presidency.

Carlos Humberto Lopez-Gonzalez (Grandfather) after the conservatives murder his father he turned to Left Wing Political activist and Politician, he supported the 1944 left wing revolution and was minister of transport during the presidency of Juan Jose Arevalo, 1945-1951 and Chief of Customs during the presidency of Jacobo Arbenz 1951-1954. He was briefly imprisoned and released during the right wing counter-revolution in 1955. He died of natural causes in 1979.

Through his maternal grandfather, Adolfo Mazariegos, Carlos is a direct descendant of Diego de Mazariegos, Conquistador of the region of Chiapas Mexico, and First Lieutenant Governor of Chiapas between 1528-1529. Diego Mazariegos was the first cousin of Alonso de Estrada, a Colonial Official and Governor of New Spain between 1525 and 1528, Alonso was allegedly the illegitimate son of King Ferdinand II of Aragon.

== Career ==
During his younger years, Lopez-Barillas spent a short spell working as a fashion photographer for the fashion magazine Amiga, Upon closure of the magazine he was offered a post in the news section of the local daily Prensa Libre, an experience which marked the transformation of his work from fashion to reportage and investigative journalism. He worked there for a few years until he was offered a post with the American news agency the Associated Press (AP).

Lopez-Barillas continued working for AP until his subsequent move to live in Europe in 1990, when he developed a working relationship with the US Daily The New York Times. Apart from his documentary work, his work includes high level investigations into corruption of public institutions and non-governmental organisations NGO's.

Among other awards, he received a replica of the Nobel Peace Prize medal from Nobel laureate Rigoberta Menchú in December 1994 for his documentary and humanitarian work.

== Sports ==
In his youth Lopez-Barillas won several Guatemalan skateboarding competitions, specialising in pool and vertical riding, he went to win the national aerial championship in 1978 with a recorded 6-foot high aerial. His interest with board based sports extended into surfing. He became active in swimming and waterpolo during his university years, first joining the national university USAC team, and later drafted into the Guatemalan National Waterpolo Squad where he played over 100 international caps, between 1980 and 1995. Among other victories, he played in the different teams that won the national waterpolo and swimming championships between 1981 and 1995, He won gold medals in the Central American Games in 1985, 1989, and 1993, also gold in the Central America Mexico and Caribbean games of 1986 and 1990. After his move to Europe he continued playing waterpolo in Ireland, playing with the team Clonard in the first division of the Irish Waterpolo League. Lopez-Barillas suffered a serious accident while snowboarding in 2002, fracturing his left arm and requiring reconstructive surgery to his left wrist and hand, to date he is still active in skateboarding, snowboarding, surfing and kite surfing. He is still active playing Squash at competition level in London, UK.
