= Marcelo de Melo =

Brazilian artist

Marcelo José de Melo (born 23 January 1972) is a Brazilian artist. He was born in Apucarana, Paraná, and lives and works in Amsterdam, the Netherlands. (Naturalised British in 2003).

Marcelo de Melo has been living in Europe since 1996. In Brazil, he worked in the theatre as a professional actor, lighting designer, and stage manager. He took part in several productions for Teatro Guaíra, in Curitiba. Since his arrival in Europe he developed a keen interest in mosaic art. From 1998 to 2005, he was based in Edinburgh, Scotland, where he carried out most of his mosaic production. He is best known for his 'structural mosaic technique' (tesserae used as structural elements as well as surface embellishment). Two of his structural works received awards: Running Rug received the Juror's Prize at the SAMA - Earth Elements Exhibition in Miami in 2003 and Low Tech High Res received a Picassiette Prix in Chartres, France in 2016. De Melo travelled worldwide visiting museums and archaeological sites in pursuit of his passion for mosaics and art in general. He went on a study trip to Southeast Asia in 2002/2003 and produced an article on mosaic art in Thailand, Laos, and Vietnam published in Grout Magazine (BAMM - UK). He has exhibited in several countries including Brazil, France, Italy, Japan, the UK, and the US. Several of his works have been featured in books and magazines worldwide. His production is varied, ranging from sculptures to installation art. In 2017, de Melo had the opportunity to exhibit alongside Lucio Fontana and Mirko Basaldella at the Museo d'Arte della città di Ravenna.

Running Rug, 2001 - structural mosaic work

His book De Kunst van het Mozaieken (ISBN 9058777391), jointly written with a Dutch mosaicist, was published in the Netherlands in January 2010 by Forte Uitgevers BV.

"In the irreverent world of Marcelo de Melo, mosaics are a launching point for his ideas and perceptions. Pushing the boundaries of traditional techniques, de Melo uses materials only as a means to an end, that end being the impassioned request to stimulate the viewer to the thoughts beyond the physical piece." (JoAnn Locktov)

"With a strongly cultivated and eclectic training, he has translated into the language of mosaic […] a view permeated with the denunciation of contemporaneity, with an increasingly social and, at the same time, fiercely ironic and sacrilegious style. De Melo's modus operandi is close, as an artistic practice, to the expressive and poetic line of other Brazilian artists such as Vik Muniz or to the designers Humberto and Fernando Campanha in the valorisation and experimental and symbolic use of raw and recycled materials […] perceived as waste, yet elevated to the level of artistic material, while maintaining their quality and history." (Sabina Ghinassi)

== Education ==
PhD Art Practice, University for the Creative Arts | University of Brighton, 2014-2019

MA Fine Art, University for the Creative Arts, Canterbury, UK, 2010-2011 (Distinction)

BA History, Federal University of Paraná, Curitiba, Brazil, 1992–1996

Diploma in Acting (Theatre), Paraná State College, Curitiba, Brazil, 1991-1992

== Publications ==
Marcelo's mosaics have been featured in:

Books

- Hunkin, Tessa. Modern Mosaic. Firefly Books, UK, 2003. ISBN 1-55297-701-3
- Kelly, Sarah. The Complete Mosaic Handbook. Firefly Books, US, October 2004. ISBN 1-55297-774-9
- Sonia King. Mosaic Techniques & Traditions. Sterling Publishing, US, 2003. ISBN 0-8069-7577-6
- Locktov, JoAnn. Mosaic Art and Style. Rockport Publishers, US, March 2005. ISBN 1-59253-145-8
- MacKay, Jill. Creative Garden Mosaics. Sterling Publishing/Lark Books: US, 2004. ISBN 1-57990-599-4
- Mills, Theresa. The Mosaic Artist's Bible. Trafalgar Square Publishings: US, 2005. ISBN 1-57076-293-7
- Mills, T. Mosaic Basics. Barron's Educational Series. US, 2006. ISBN 0-7641-5961-5
- Pereira, Bea. Mosaico sem Segredos. Curitiba, Brazil, 2006
- Wates, Rosalind. The Mosaic Decorator's Sourcebook. David & Charles: UK, 2001. ISBN 0-7153-1139-5
- Wates, R. The Mosaic Idea Book. North Light Books: US, 2000. ISBN 1-58180-095-9

Magazine Articles & Newspapers:

- Baierl, S. Uma volta ao mundo do mosaico. In: MÃO NA MASSA. São Paulo, Brazil, Oct. 2003. n. 10
- De Melo, Marcelo. A la mode sud-américaine. IN: MOSAÏQUE MAGAZINE. France, 2014. v. 8, p. 51-53
- De Melo, M. A Trip to Wonder, Mosaic art in Laos, Thailand and Vietnam. IN: GROUT MAGAZINE. BAMM. Jun/Jul. 2003
- De Melo, M. Hasard, contexte et récits. IN: MOSAÏQUE MAGAZINE. France. Jan. 2014
- De Melo, M. Le Monde Onirique de Lysiane Bourdon: un cadre conceptuel. IN: MOSAÏQUE MAGAZINE. France, 2015. v. 10, p. 80-83
- De Melo, M. Mosaïque à la Saatchi Gallery de Londres. IN: MOSAÏQUE MAGAZINE. France, 2015. v. 10, p. 62
- De Melo, M. Mosaïque contemporaine à l'Universidade Federal Fluminense de Rio de Janeiro. IN: MOSAÏQUE MAGAZINE. France, 2015. v. 9, p. 50-53
- De Melo, M. Occupying Time, Occupying Space. IN: Excursions. University of Sussex, 2015. vol. 6, no. 1. ISSN 2044-4095
- De Melo, M. Uma Viagem Inesquecível, Mosaicos no Laos, Tailândia e Vietnã. IN: A TESSELA. AMPAP. Curitiba, Oct. 2003
- De Melo, M. Window Shopping in Ravenna: The 2nd International Mosaic Biennial. IN: GROUT MAGAZINE. BAMM. UK Oct. 2002
- Floriano, Magaly. Além do Mosaico. IN: Mosaico na Rede Magazine: Arte & Estilo. Curitiba, Brazil, 2013. ISSN 2178-5023
- Floriano, M. A Arte Estrutural de Marcelo de Melo. IN: Mosaico na Rede Magazine: Arte & Estilo. Curitiba, 2010. ISSN 2178-5023
- Gonçalves, M. F. Palestra. In: CADERNO G - GAZETA DO POVO. Curitiba, Brazil, 10 April 2003
- Gordon, G. Hands on. In: AT HOME - Scotland on Sunday. Edinburgh, UK, June, 2003
- Hunter, N. All broken up. In: HOME PLUS SCOTLAND. Edinburgh, UK, Nov/Dec. 2001
- Lauton, T. Mosaico, riqueza e perfeição nos detalhes. In: ARTE COM AS MÃOS. São Paulo, Brazil, Sept. 2002. ed. 01
- Punton, Allan. British Mosaic Art at the Brink. In: MOSAIC. Mosaic Art Assoc. in Japan: Tokyo, 2004. Nov.vol. 9
- Rodinick, V. Quando mosaicar é como comer e dormir. In: ARTE COM AS MÃOS. São Paulo, Brazil, Nov. 2002. ed. 02
- San Martin, P. Estante de Idéias In: ARTE COM AS MÃOS. São Paulo, Brazil, 2005. ed. 20
- Taj Mahal Review. Allahabad, India, December 2005. Vol. 4, n. 2
