= Tara Palmer-Tomkinson =

British television personality (1971–2017)

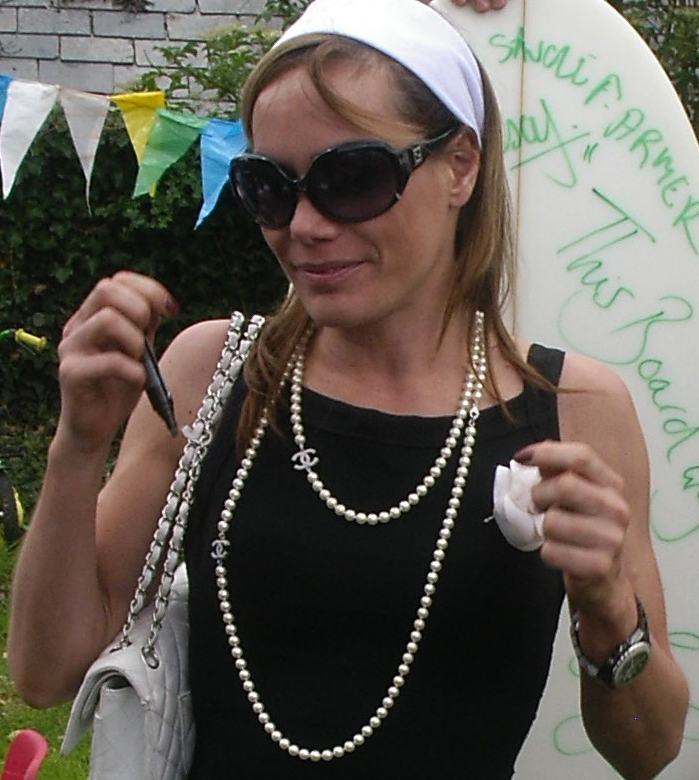
- Palmer-Tomkinson in June 2007
- Born: Tara Claire Palmer-Tomkinson; 23 December 1971; Basingstoke, Hampshire, England
- Died: 8 February 2017 (aged 45); South Kensington, London, England
- Other name: T.P-T
- Occupations: Socialite, television personality, model, charity patron
- Years active: 1995–2014
- Father: Charles Palmer-Tomkinson
- Relatives: Santa Montefiore (sister); Jeremy Palmer-Tomkinson (uncle)

Tara Claire Palmer-Tomkinson (23 December 1971 – 8 February 2017) was an English socialite and television personality. She appeared in several television shows, including the reality programme I'm a Celebrity...Get Me Out of Here!. She died from a perforated ulcer on 8 February 2017.

== Early life ==
Tara Palmer-Tomkinson was born in Basingstoke, Hampshire on 23 December 1971, the daughter of Patricia (née Dawson) and Charles Palmer-Tomkinson. Her father represented Great Britain as a skier at the 1964 Winter Olympics. She was the younger sister of author Santa Montefiore. Her mother was of Argentine descent. Palmer-Tomkinson was educated at Sherborne School for Girls in Dorset. After she left school, she worked briefly in the City of London for Rothschild bank.

== Writing career ==
In the mid- to late 1990s, a weekly column for The Sunday Times appeared under her name. However, this was actually ghostwritten by author Wendy Holden based on Palmer-Tomkinson's "phoned in description of her activities during the preceding week." She subsequently similarly contributed to The Spectator, The Mail on Sunday, GQ, Eve, Harpers and Queen, Tatler, InStyle and The Observer sporadically.

In September 2007, her book The Naughty Girl's Guide to Life, co-authored with Sharon Marshall, was published by Sphere. It was serialised in The Sunday Times Style magazine.

In October 2010, her first novel, Inheritance, was published by Pan Books. This was also ghostwritten.

In 2012, her second novel, Infidelity, was published by Pan Books.

== Television appearances ==
In 1999, Palmer-Tomkinson made an appearance on The Frank Skinner Show, and shown on an episode of 100 Greatest (TV series).

In 2000, Palmer-Tomkinson made an appearance on The 11 O'Clock Show S4E1.

In 2002, Palmer-Tomkinson made an appearance on the first series of the British television series I'm a Celebrity...Get Me Out of Here!, finishing as runner up. She was a contestant on a celebrity Christmas edition of Blind Date later that year. She appeared as a Star in a Reasonably Priced Car in Top Gear's sixth episode of series one. In November 2005, she presented her third behind the scenes series on ITV2 for I'm a Celebrity...Get Me Out of Here! NOW!. She was also a guest on the first and second series of Would I Lie to You? in 2007 and 2008.

Palmer-Tomkinson's presenting credits included Animals Do the Funniest Things with Tony Blackburn, the UK selection for the Junior Eurovision Song Contest in 2003, The British Comedy Awards...Party On, What Kids Really Think, Popworld, Top of the Pops, SMTV Live, Company Magazine Bachelor of the Year, Dumb Britain, Extreme, a role as a team captain on Bognor or Bust which was hosted by Angus Deayton and work for GMTV, Five, LBC radio, the music channel The Hits and the Living TV programme Dirty Cows.

In 2007, Palmer-Tomkinson was a contestant on Comic Relief Does Fame Academy for the BBC. She gave away tickets to see her compete in the show to "ordinary people" who had helped her out (the other contestants generally giving their free tickets to other celebrities). She invited the policeman who found her stolen car, the locksmith who helped when she was locked out of her house and her parents' local shopkeepers.

== Other work ==
Palmer-Tomkinson played the piano, as was demonstrated at events at the Queen Elizabeth Hall with the National Symphony Orchestra, at the Royal Albert Hall, and at The Coliseum during a Leonard Bernstein Tribute. She hosted the Classic FM Gramophone Awards in 2005. She wrote a pop song called "5 Seconds" which she performed on Loose Women.

From 2013 to 2014, Palmer-Tomkinson, herself autistic, was patron of Scottish charity Speur Ghlan, which delivers early intervention for young children diagnosed with autism or developmental delays. The appointment garnered media attention for having been facilitated through social media.

== Personal life ==
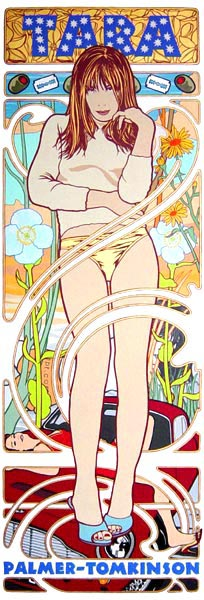
Tara Palmer-Tomkinson by Paul Harvey

Palmer-Tomkinson's family have a close relationship with the British royal family. She attended the wedding of Prince Charles and Camilla Parker Bowles as well as the wedding of Prince William and Catherine Middleton.

In 2004, Paul Harvey's painting of Palmer-Tomkinson was exhibited in The Stuckists Punk Victorian show at the Walker Art Gallery for the Liverpool Biennial.

=== Drug addiction ===
Palmer-Tomkinson was addicted to cocaine in her early career. In 1999, she appeared on The Frank Skinner Show, slurring her words and forgetting the host's name. In 2006, she received extensive publicity after her nasal septum collapsed due to her cocaine addiction. Pictures were printed in several British tabloids. She underwent cosmetic surgery to have it rebuilt.

=== Arrest ===
On 22 December 2014, Palmer-Tomkinson was arrested at Heathrow Airport. This followed her reaction to being refused access to a first-class lounge. Following her arrest, she said that a panic attack triggered her behaviour. She stated: "I wasn't drunk, there was no disorderly. I was cautioned, I saw a doctor, they were nice to me", before flying to Switzerland to celebrate her 43rd birthday.

=== Illness and death ===
In January 2016, Palmer-Tomkinson was diagnosed with a prolactinoma, a benign tumour (adenoma) of the pituitary gland, and announced her illness publicly in November of that year. Prolactinomas are not malignant, and the treatment was successful. She also had ANCA Associated Vasculitis. On 8 February 2017, Palmer-Tomkinson was found dead at her home in London. The death was treated as unexplained but not suspicious. Her sister later told the media that the cause of death was a perforated ulcer and peritonitis.

== Bibliography ==
=== Novels ===
- Palmer-Tomkinson, Tara (2010). Inheritance. London: Pan Books. ISBN 9780330513265.
- Palmer-Tomkinson, Tara (2012). Infidelity. London: Pan Books. ISBN 9780330513333.

=== Other books ===
- Palmer-Tomkinson, Tara; Marshall, Sharon (2008). The Naughty Girl's Guide to Life. London: Sphere. ISBN 9780751539974.

| Preceded by Edith Bowman | Comic Relief Does Fame Academy Winner; Series 3 (2007) | Succeeded by Series ended |
