= W. G. S. Adams =

Political scientist (1874–1966)

Professor W. G. S. Adams CH
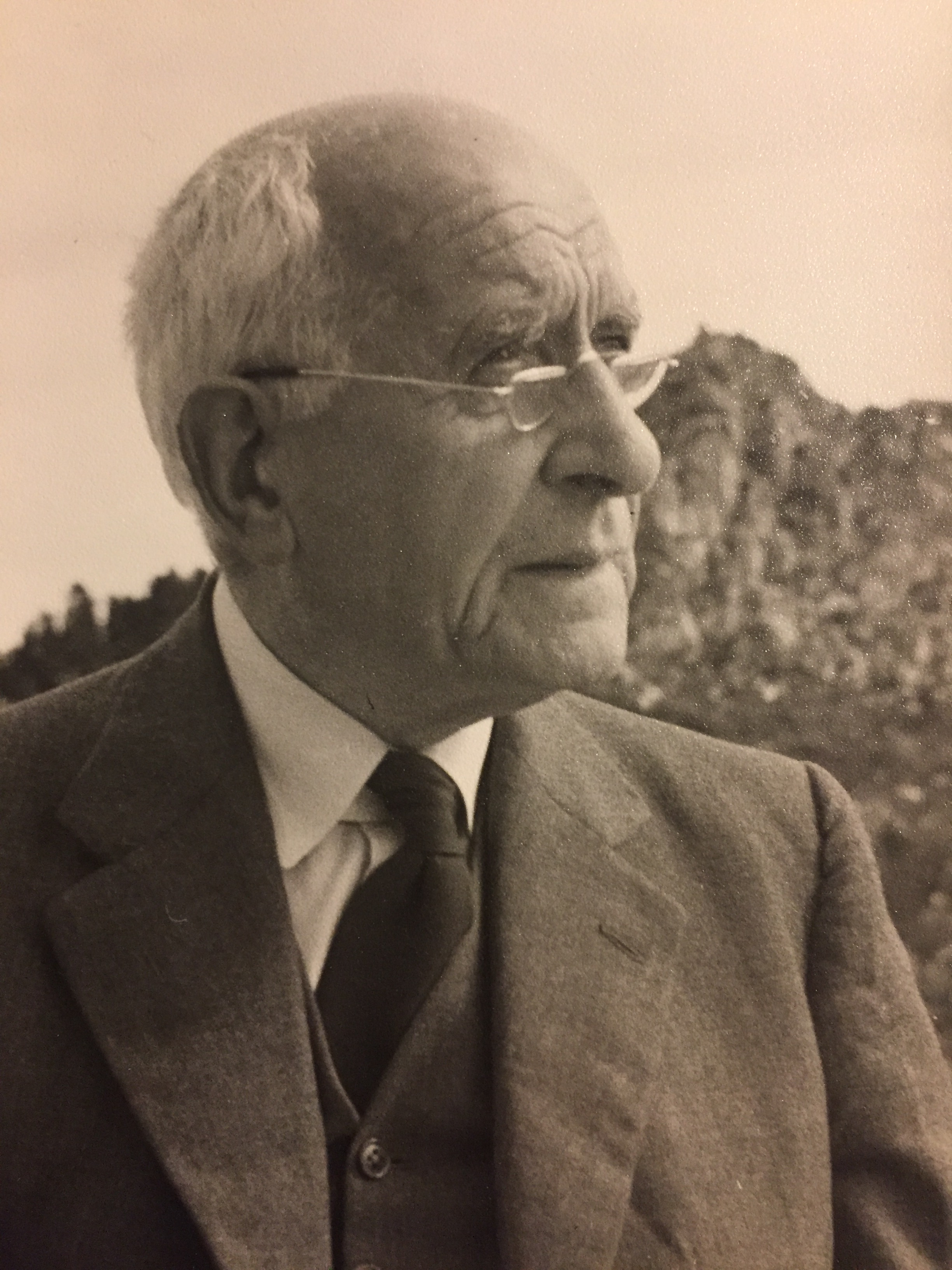
- Born: William George Stewart Adams; 8 November 1874; Hamilton, Lanarkshire, Scotland
- Died: 30 January 1966 (aged 91); Fahan House, Fahan, County Donegal, Ireland
- Citizenship: United Kingdom
- Education: University of Glasgow; Balliol College, Oxford
- Occupation: Political Scientist

William George Stewart Adams (8 November 1874 – 30 January 1966) was a Scottish political scientist and public servant who became principal of an Oxford College and a leader in the fields of voluntary service and rural regeneration.

== Background and education ==
George Adams was born in Auchingramont Road, Hamilton, the younger son of John and Margaret (née Stewart) Adams, by whom he was given "an intellectual and somewhat evangelistic upbringing". His father was Rector (headmaster) of St John's Grammar School and had founded Gilbertfield House School, both in Hamilton. His mother came from a Glasgow mercantile family and was a niece of the social activist John Murray.

Educated at St John's (where he was School Dux in 1891), Adams proceeded to Glasgow University with a Dundonald Bursary in Philosophy. At Glasgow he was Blackstone medallist in Latin and Sandford scholar in Greek and obtained a first-class degree in Classics (1897). He afterwards went up to Balliol College, Oxford, with a Snell Exhibition, and gained Firsts in Greats (1900) and Modern History (1901), taking political philosophy and political economy as his special subjects. He was president of the Arnold Society and rowed for his college.

== Early career and Irish appointment ==
Following a year as a tutor at Borough Road Teacher Training College, Isleworth, Adams briefly lectured on Finance and Colonial Policy in the University of Chicago's Department of Political Economy (1902) and afterwards spent three months in the United States and Canada studying the work of governmental and educational institutions. Returning to Britain in 1903, he became Lecturer in Economics at Victoria University of Manchester, where he was also secretary of the university's educational outreach initiative.

In 1904 he accepted Sir Horace Plunkett's offer of the position of Head of Statistics and Intelligence at the Department of Agriculture and Technical Instruction for Ireland, of which Plunkett had charge. He remained in post for five years, obtaining close insight into both the workings of the civil service and matters of central and local government administration and becoming both the "right-hand man" and close personal friend of Plunkett, who inspired in him a lifelong concern for rural welfare. The annual reports Adams issued while in Ireland were "more than mere statistical tables ... each was a valuable economic treatise on the trade of the country", and in 1909 it was suggested that his work on the Irish economy during the previous five years "has done more to stimulate practical patriotism than all the political speeches of the last decade".

In 1911 he was appointed to the Irish Financial Committee, which was established, under the chairmanship of Sir Henry Primrose, to examine financial relations between Ireland and the rest of the United Kingdom and to consider how revenues should be allocated in the event of Ireland being granted home rule. Adams's belief that a federalist approach was key to resolving the Irish Question was reflected in the committee's recommendation that a future Irish Government should have full control over Irish revenues, but H. H. Asquith's administration declined to adopt this approach in the Third Home Rule Bill.

== Political science at Oxford, 1910–1918 ==
By the time of his membership of the Primrose Committee, Adams had resumed an academic career. The Oxford University Endowment Fund had financed a three-years Lectureship in Political Theory and Institutions to which Adams was appointed in early 1910. The Warden of All Souls College, Sir William Anson, intervened to procure conversion of the Lecturership into a Chichele Readership further endowed by a Fellowship of All Souls, to which Adams was elected on 15 June 1911. It has been suggested that Anson knew little about Adams and wrongly assumed his appointment would serve the Unionist cause in Ireland, but the selection was generally well-received and Adams proved an able lecturer and effective organiser.

In 1912 his Readership was, with the benefit of further endowment by the Committee for a National Memorial to W. E. Gladstone, upgraded to the Gladstone Professorship of Political Theory and Institutions, and Adams became a member of the university's Hebdomadal Council.

Adams took a leading role in rationalising Oxford's research and teaching facilities for social and political sciences, first as secretary of the Association to Advance the Study of Social and Political Subjects and then as a promoter of the Barnett House initiative. In 1913 he, Sidney Ball and A. L. Smith agreed to buy a house in central Oxford in order "to make it a centre of social economic studies and interests with a good specialist library" and to be named after Samuel Augustus Barnett. Barnett House was formally opened on 6 June 1914, when Horace Plunkett, who was visiting Adams, spoke on the need for research into rural matters. Besides becoming an important resource for the university, the House provided a range of services to Oxfordshire's rural communities, including circulating books to schools and village halls in outlying districts.

The paucity of access to books across the nation's rural communities was highlighted in the comprehensive survey of public library provision which the Carnegie Foundation's UK Trustees had engaged Adams to undertake in 1913. His Report, published by the Trustees in 1915, argued that such provision should be part of an overall State system and that its administration and funding at county rather than borough level could correct the imbalance between urban and rural facilities. The Adams Report has been described as "of outstanding importance", resulting in fundamental change to the Carnegie Trustees' library policy and paving the way for the Public Libraries Act of 1919, the evolution of the County Library Scheme, the creation of the Central Library for Students (later the National Central Library), which became a clearing house for interlibrary loans, and developments such as university education for librarians.

In May 1915 Adams successfully proposed to the Hebdomadal Council that a committee be appointed to evaluate establishing an Oxford degree course in Political Economy, Political Science and Public Law. The committee (of which he was a member) recommended the institution of such a course for post-graduate study leading to a degree in Civil Science. The recommendation was accepted and the committee prepared an enabling statute but further progress languished under wartime constraints.

== The Political Quarterly ==
During 1913 Adams made arrangements with the Oxford University Press for publication of a quarterly journal "devoted to every branch of political science, from the reviewing of its literature to the criticism of current affairs". The first issue of the Political Quarterly appeared in February 1914, many copies from its print-run of 3,000 being sent to North America.

Seven further issues followed, with substantial editorials by Adams and articles by Arnold Toynbee, Lewis Namier, Arthur Greenwood, R. H. Tawney and Ernest Barker, before publication was suspended at the end of 1916 owing to war "service in the field or at home". The Political Quarterly did not appear again until the title was revived in 1930 by a group including Leonard Woolf, J. M. Keynes and Harold Laski.

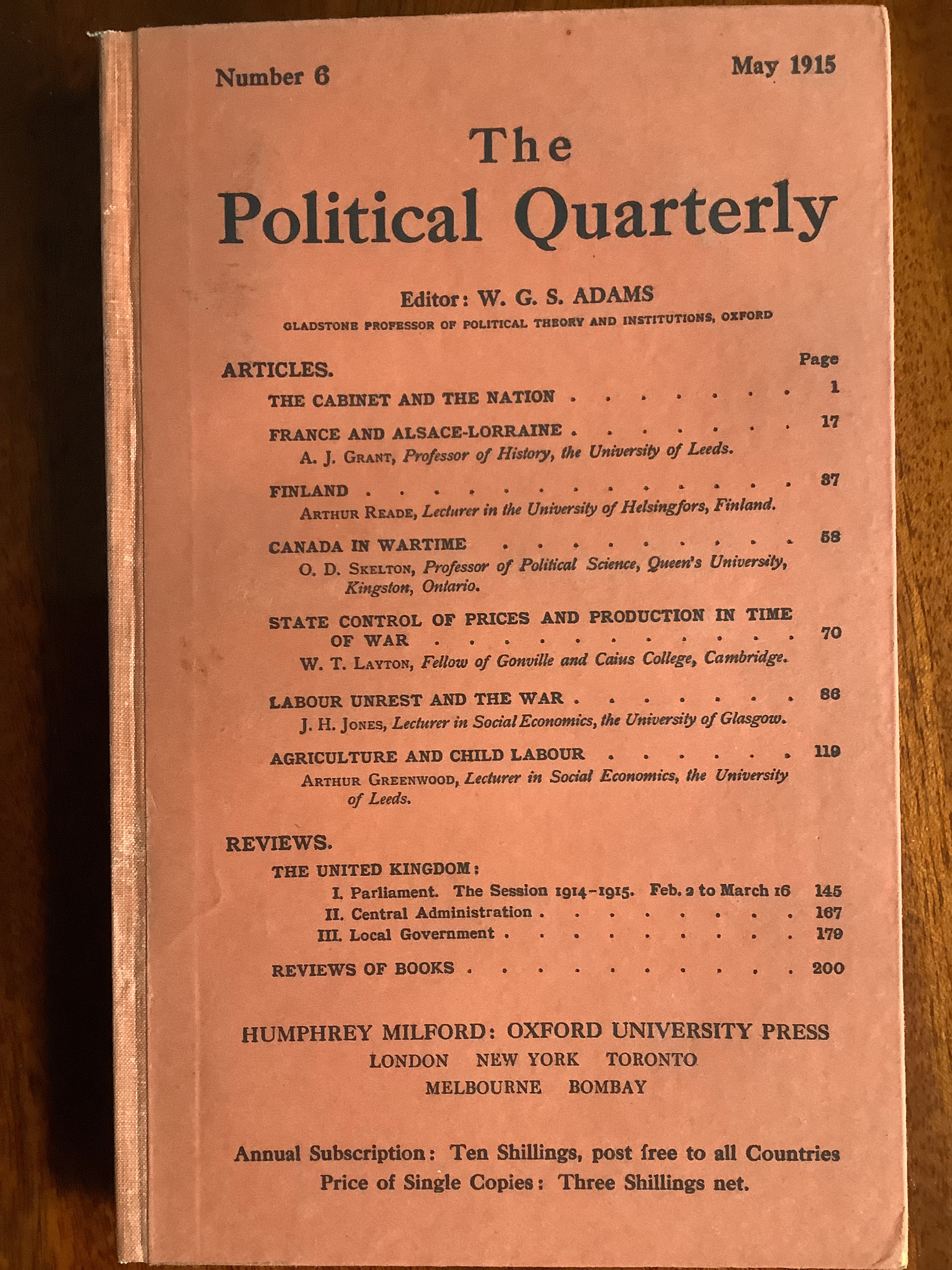
Political Quarterly, issue of May 1915

Adams himself served at the Ministry of Munitions from early 1915 and in July was given charge of its Badges Section, determining the categories of tradesmen whose continued civilian employment was essential to the war effort and qualified them for "On War Service" status. He became an adviser to the Council for the Study of International Relations, and in 1915 was appointed to the Treasury Committee which reviewed the scheme of examination for Class I of the Home Civil Service.

== Principal Secretary to the Prime Minister, 1917–1918 ==
While at the Ministry of Munitions, Adams was known to David Lloyd George, the Munitions Minister. But it was at the recommendation of Thomas Jones, reinforced by David Davies, that Lloyd George, on becoming prime minister in 1916, appointed Adams to be his Principal Secretary.

The Prime Minister's Secretariat, popularly known as Downing Street's "Garden Suburb", was formed to assist Lloyd George discharge his overall responsibilities within the constraints of the war cabinet system: its function was to maintain contact with the numerous departments of government, to collect information, and to report on matters of special concern. As Principal Secretary, Adams – together with the Secretariat's other leading member, Philip Kerr – determined its organisation and the allocation of work among the other secretaries (who included David Davies, Joseph Davies, Waldorf Astor and, later, Cecil Harmsworth). Adams himself was responsible for covering Treasury, Home Office, Local Government, Education, Food, Agriculture and Labour Affairs, initially concentrating on Labour and Food issues. He promoted measures to regenerate agriculture and increase national crop production, conceiving and organising the Fertilisers Committee and involving himself with tractor supply. He challenged Food Ministry policy on sugar imports and influenced both the text and the practical application of the Corn Production Act 1917. He attended and spoke at War Cabinet meetings. He was also a member of the Reconstruction Committee (set up to address issues expected to arise in the aftermath of war) and served as chairman of its education panel, which began to formulate plans for raising of school leaving age that were more ambitious than those proposed by the Ministry of Education.

From early 1917 he increasingly worked on the Irish Question and played a key role in arranging the Irish Convention that sat from July 1917 to April 1918 with Horace Plunkett as chairman. Personal relationships with prominent figures in Irish public life enabled him both to explore and to influence opinion in a way conducive to the Convention's progress. His correspondence with Plunkett became the principal line of communication between the United Kingdom Government and the Convention and, from December 1917 onwards, he orchestrated government policy in an attempt to avoid the Convention's collapse. His was the principal hand in drafting the government's proposals accepted by a majority (but an inadequate majority) of the Convention in April 1918 and, after the Convention initiative was spent, he played a major part in preparation of a new Home Rule Bill.

Together with Kerr he edited the War Cabinet Reports of 1917 and 1918, but, with the coming of peace, the Prime Minister's Secretariat, in which his work was unremunerated, was disbanded. Adams refused both a knighthood and, after some hesitation, a Coalition Coupon in the General Election of 1918.

== Political Science at Oxford, 1919–1933 ==
The scheme for a School of Civil Science, still in abeyance when Adams resumed peacetime lecturing at Oxford, encountered competition in the form of a proposal to establish an Honour School of Modern Humanities, in which philosophy would be the dominant element. This provoked a competing proposal for an Honour School of Economic and Political Science.

Various committees debated and developed the several proposals, Adams "fighting hard and successfully for the 'equipollence' of politics with the other live subjects". He sat on both the Civil Science and Political Science Committees and also on the Civil Science and Modern Humanities Joint-Committee. In the Joint-Committee he ultimately made common cause with A. D. Lindsay, the philosophers' main spokesman, to finalise the scheme for an Honour School of Philosophy, Politics and Economics which was eventually approved by the university in Convocation in November 1920. He was a member of the PPE Board of Studies from its outset and of the group that reviewed the school's governing statute in 1929–30. The review ultimately led to introduction, within the politics segment of the school's examination, of compulsory papers on Political Institutions and British Political and Constitutional History and the numbers attending Adams's "carefully prepared and lucid" lectures grew accordingly.

In 1919 he had been offered the position of director of the London School of Economics, coupled with its chair of political science, but declined. Somewhat earlier he had refused the post of Principal of Queen's University, Belfast. In 1919–22 he was a member of the Royal Commission on Oxford and Cambridge Universities, considering state funding issues.

In 1923 he succeeded Sidney Webb as a commissioner under the Development Acts, continuing as such until 1949. In 1922–24 he was one of the three-member Agricultural Tribunal of Investigation set up to consider improved farming practices adopted by foreign governments during the previous fifty years, and in 1924 he was in large measure responsible for the establishment of the Institute of Agricultural Engineering at Oxford with financial assistance from the Development Commission. In 1926–28 he was a member of the Joint-Committee of Enquiry established by the BBC and British Institution of Adult Education that produced the New Ventures in Broadcasting Report, leading to formation of the Central Council for Broadcast Adult Education and launch of The Listener magazine.

He gave ten Stevenson Lectures on Citizenship at Glasgow in 1923-4, and lectured at the Lowell Institute, Harvard, in 1924, and at McGill University, Montreal, in 1933. He chaired the British Group which attended the Institute of Pacific Relations Conference in Hangzhou and Shanghai in 1931 and he lectured at eleven universities in China and Hong Kong during the course of that year. He was involved in the arrangements whereby Oxford University introduced the tutorial system into Chinese education. He became Chairman of the Universities' China Committee in 1942, and was made a member of the Order of the Brilliant Star.

In 1933 he was elected Warden of All Souls College and retired from the Gladstone Chair. In the same year he joined the Market Supply Committee, newly established under the Agricultural Marketing Act 1933, to review and report on the supply and import of agricultural products.

== Voluntary Service and Rural Communities ==
In 1920 Adams became Chairman of the National Council of Social Services. Instrumental in its foundation a few months earlier, he was "the man who was to shape its destiny for over thirty years". The National Council's objective was to co-ordinate the welfare activities of voluntary organisations and central and municipal government, seeking also to foster the formation of local Social Service Councils as necessary to streamline co-operation "on the ground".

Adams's belief that voluntary action was core to the development of good citizenship and democracy was reflected in his address to the NCSS's first national conference when he told the 400 delegates: "The good done by the State must depend upon the voluntary spirit behind it... Local and central authorities are well suited for carrying out certain functions but it is the voluntary spirit which must move them".

Government came to look on the NCSS as an important partner in welfare work: in 1932, at the request of the Ministry of Labour, the National Council assumed responsibility for some 1,500 occupational clubs for the unemployed, and as the Second World War approached it agreed to create and resource a national network of Citizens' Advice Bureaux. In 1940 Adams was appointed to the government's advisory committee on maximising voluntary co-operation in tackling social problems arising from the war. He remained NCSS Chairman until 1949, acknowledged as "the central figure of the exceptional men and women" who directed its affairs.

In parallel with his NCSS work, Adams pioneered the creation and growth of Rural Community Councils. He recruited Grace Hadow, with whom he had worked at the Munitions Ministry, to become Secretary of Barnett House. The two shared a vision of a "new rural civilization" based on co-operative principles and in 1920 the Council of Barnett House approved Adams's scheme whereby the resources of the House would be made available to villages within 30 miles of Oxford. Forging links with the YMCA, the Workers' Educational Association, the Women's Institute and other voluntary bodies, Barnett House arranged for the villages to receive visiting lecturers, circulating libraries, information on social and economic issues, and assistance in applying for financial grants.

The agencies participating in this endeavour were represented on a committee that became known as the Oxfordshire Rural Community Council, Adams serving as chairman of its executive committee from 1925 until 1950. He regarded the Oxfordshire scheme as a pilot exercise which, if successful, should be adopted nationwide – and so it was. By 1942, NCSS initiatives had resulted in the formation of twenty-four more Rural Community Councils covering twenty-nine counties in England and Wales. With the aid of grants and loans from the Plunkett Foundation, the Carnegie UK Trust and the Development Fund, the RCCs facilitated schemes that provided village halls, playing fields, allotments and other amenities. Adams's positions as a trustee of both the Plunkett and Carnegie organisations and as a Development Commissioner helped streamline the funding process. By 1939 the RCCs had become "integral to organised social life in England" and were to have "some impact on parts of the Empire".

The human and material resources of Barnett House were indispensable to the early phase of the rural communities project and the importance of the several interdependent strands of activity based there was recognised by a visit from Queen Mary during her tour of Oxford in 1921. Adams was President of Barnett House from 1929 to 1946.

In 1929 the Ministry of Agriculture asked the NCSS and the Carnegie Trustees to organise a voluntary, self-governing association to which local clubs already formed by young farmers could affiliate and which would have both a social and an educational agenda. In response the Federation of Young Farmers' Clubs of England and Wales was formed in 1932 with Adams as chairman. Under his guidance the Federation's wider mission became "to build up the rural community... to train young people to come forward as leaders, to train them not only in business methods but in team work and co-operation". He continued as Federation Chairman until 1946, taking a close interest in the movement and being described in 1943 as "the great 'protector'" of the clubs.

== Warden of All Souls, 1933–1945 ==
Having promised, on joining the college, to be "a worthy son of All Souls", Adams presided over celebration of the college's quincentenary in 1938. In A. L. Rowse's judgement, "He made a good Warden, and was moreover a dear man, apt to be right", while Arthur Salter recalled that the College "welcomed his practical hold on the reality of every issue of policy with which we were confronted". He recruited for All Souls' Fellowships a succession of significant figures in the academic world, from H. D. Henderson in 1934 to G. D. H. Cole in 1944. In the 1930s he took up the cases of academic refugees from Germany and Austria with the result that several were able to progress to distinguished careers from specially created Chichele lectureships at All Souls. Among those he helped was Max Grünhut, and in 1942–43 the two worked together on a survey of the social and educational consequences of wartime evacuation of children to Oxford. During his time as Warden, Adams's influence contributed to a doubling of All Souls' agricultural estate.

From 1937, Adams sat on the British Hanseatic Scholarships advisory committee and was a member of the Nuffield College Committee appointed to progress creation of the physical and academic fabric of the college endowed by Lord Nuffield's Benefaction. In the war years he organised a series of social reform conferences and joined the committee, formed as part of the Nuffield College Social Reconstruction Survey, considering the post-war role of statutory and voluntary social services. From 1941 onwards he convened what became known as the "All Souls Group", a gathering of specialists in the field of education who met (initially at All Souls) to discuss the administrative, philosophical and social aspects of education. The group met every three to four months, inviting guests such as R. A. Butler, and its deliberations have been said to help shape wartime and postwar educational decisions. It has continued to meet into the present century.

During the 1930s Adams was a member of the national Market Supply Committee, which reviewed the distribution and prices of agricultural products, and of the Overseas Settlement Board, which co-ordinated support for emigrants to the British Dominions and colonies. He chaired the Imperial Conference on Co-operative Farming held at Glasgow in 1938, in which year the University of Glasgow made him an Honorary Doctor of Laws. He was made an Honorary Doctor of Civil Law by Oxford in the following year and an Honorary Doctor of Laws by Manchester in 1943. He was a Pro-Vice Chancellor at Oxford from 1939 until 1945, when he retired as Warden of All Souls and was elected an Honorary Fellow of the college.

He was president of the Classical Society of Scotland in 1946. In 1949 he gave a series of lectures as a Visiting Professor in the Graduate School of History at the University of Toronto, and in 1953 he made a three-month speaking and fact-finding tour of South Africa sponsored by the Carnegie Foundation of New York.

He was made a Member of the Order of the Companions of Honour in the 1936 Birthday Honours.

== Preservation of Oxford's Rural Hinterland ==
As early as 1918, Adams mooted the formation of a trust to acquire an area of four square miles adjacent to Oxford, including the distinctive landmark of Cumnor Hurst, and to farm it on co-operative principles while making its fir-crowned summit a permanent memorial to Oxford men who had fallen in war. With the support of a group of friends he was able to realise a more modest version of this scheme in 1920, bringing some 700 acres east of Cumnor Hurst into the ownership of a preservation trust. He was later very active in the affairs of the Oxford Preservation Trust, of which he was a foundation trustee in 1927.

== Personal life ==
In 1908 Adams married Muriel Lane, a former Irish women's hockey international, who came from an old Anglo-Irish family with connections that crossed some of the fault-lines of Irish society. Their son was born in 1910, and from 1920 the family lived on Boars Hill, where Adams was "a practical hog and wheat raiser" at his farm of Powder Hill, bordering on Matthew Arnold's "Signal Elm". Sir Horace Plunkett liked to stay with the Adams family in this haven for professors and poets "with Sir William Beveridge as fellow guest. Gilbert Murray or John Masefield would call, and Robert Bridges would come round at night, carrying a lantern". On leaving Powder Hill, Adams made the property over to All Souls to provide additional accommodation for Fellows of the college.

In both private and public life Adams was sustained by firmly held religious conviction: brought up a Scots Presbyterian, he faithfully attended the services in All Souls Chapel and, in later life, found a spiritual home in the Church of Ireland. In retirement he removed to Fahan (pronounced 'Fawn'), a village in Inishowen in the north of County Donegal in the north-west of Ulster, where he farmed in a small way and took an active interest in the affairs of Magee University College (now part of the University of Ulster). He died on 30 January 1966, aged 91.

== Legacy ==
The organisations that Adams was instrumental in creating continue to serve the causes intrinsic to their foundation. The National Council of Social Service is now NCVO (the National Council for Voluntary Organisations); the Rural Communities Councils now combine as ACRE (Action with Communities in Rural England); and in December 2018 NCVO and ACRE announced their partnership to strengthen the support available to rural communities. The Barnett House operation has passed through several removals and reorganisations but, in its present guise as the Oxford University Department of Social Policy and Intervention, continues to be active in the fields of social research, reform and action.

Oxford's PPE degree course has flourished and become popular to such extent that it is imitated by colleges around the world. The university's large sub-Faculty of Politics, which contributes to the governance of both PPE and other degree courses, has been said to be "witness to Adams's faith in his subject at times when it was somewhat despised and when weaker men might have allowed it to fall into a subordinate position".

== Works ==
- 'The Incorporation of Trade Unions: The Position in England'. Journal of Political Economy, Vol. 11, No. 1, December 1902 (University of Chicago Press), pp. 89–92
- 'The Twelfth Census of Manufactures'. Journal of Political Economy, Vol. 11, No. 3, June 1903, pp. 343–362
- 'The Modification of the Income Tax'. Report of the Seventy-Fourth Meeting of the British Association for the Advancement of Science held at Cambridge in August 1904 (John Murray, London, 1905), pp. 663–5
- 'Some Considerations Relating to the Position of the Small Holding in the United Kingdom'. Journal of the Royal Statistical Society, Vol. 70, No. 3, September 1907, pp. 411–448
- 'Some Considerations Relating to the Statistics of Irish Production and Trade'. Dublin Journal of the Statistical and Social Inquiry Society of Ireland, Vol. XII, Part LXXXXIX, 1908/9, pp. 310–323
- 'The Home Rule Situation'. The Political Quarterly, No. 1, February 1914 (OUP), pp. 1–24
- 'The Home Rule Situation'. The Political Quarterly, No. 2, May 1914, pp. 1–16
- 'The European War'. The Political Quarterly, No. 3, September 1914, pp. 1–16. Reprinted in the Oxford Pamphlets 1914 series by OUP under the revised title The Responsibility for the War
- 'The Central Departments of Public Administration'. The Political Quarterly, No. 3, September 1914, pp. 112–136
- 'International Control'. The Political Quarterly, No. 5, February 1915, pp. 1–16
- 'The Cabinet and the Nation'. The Political Quarterly, No. 6, May 1915, pp. 1–16
- 'A Report on Library Provision and Policy by W. G. S. Adams to the Carnegie United Kingdom Trustees' (Neill & Co., Edinburgh, 1915)
- 'National Organisation and the National Will'. The Political Quarterly, No. 7, March 1916, pp. 3–19
- 'Commentaries: The Paris Conference: Relations with the United States: The Irish Problem: War Costs: Educational reconstruction.' The Political Quarterly, No. 8, September 1916, pp. 4–12
- 'The Production and Trade of the United Kingdom'. Oxford Survey of the British Empire, Vol. I, The British Isles and Mediterranean Territories (Clarendon Press, 1914), pp. 190–250
- 'Public Administration'. Oxford Survey of the British Empire, Vol. I, The British Isles and Mediterranean Territories (Clarendon Press, 1914), pp. 317–355
- 'The Basis of Constructive Internationalism'. The Annals of the American Academy of Political and Social Science, Vol. 61, 1, September 1915, pp. 217–229
- 'England After the Election'. Foreign Affairs, Vol. 2, No. 3, March 1924, pp. 351–365
- With Sir William Ashley, Final Report of the Agricultural Tribunal of Investigation (HMSO, 1924), pp. 6–99
- 'University Education in Public Administration'. Journal of Public Administration, 4(4), October 1926 (Institute for Public Administration), pp. 431–433
- 'Voluntary Social Service in the Twentieth Century'. Voluntary Social Service: A Handbook of Information and Diary of Organisations (NCSS, 1928)
- 'The Progress and Work of the Rural Community Councils'. Journal of the Farmers' Club, Part 5, 1929, pp. 80–94
- 'The State and Constructive Citizenship'. Christianity and the Crisis, ed. Percy Dearmer (Victor Gollancz, 1933), pp. 444–470
- 'Has Parliamentary Government Failed?', the text of three papers ('Forms of Representative Government', 'Defects of the Parliamentary System', and 'Relief for Westminster') delivered by Adams on BBC Radio in early 1932, subsequently printed in The Listener, Vol. 7, pp. 165-166, 212-213 and 236-237 (3, 10 and 17 February 1932) and reproduced in The Modern State, ed. Mary Adams (George Allen & Unwin, 1933)
- 'Whither England?', The Southern Review, No. 3, Summer 1937, pp. 15–27
- With others (ed. W. G. K. Duncan and C. V. Janes), The Future of Immigration into Australia and New Zealand (Australian Institute of Political Science. Angus & Robertson, Sydney, 1937)
- 'The Philosophical Study of Politics'. Journal of Philosophical Studies, Vol.14, Issue 53, January 1939 (Cambridge University Press for the Royal Institute of Philosophy), pp. 15–23
- 'Rights and Values'. The Deeper Causes of the War and its Issues (George Allen & Unwin, 1940), pp. 13–27
- 'A Memory of Horace Plunkett'. Year Book of Agricultural Co-operation 1942 (Plunkett Foundation; Cambridge, Heffer, 1942)
- 'How Shall We Govern Ourselves? Some Thoughts on Democracy's Future'. Bedfordshire Times and Standard, 19 December 1943, being an address delivered to editors of provincial newspapers in the previous month
- 'Social Consequences of Agriculture'. Scottish Journal of Agriculture, July 1944 (HMSO)
- The Creative Sources of the Good Community (printed Beckly Social Service Lecture, delivered at the Methodist Conference, 1945)
- 'Pioneers of the Rural Advance'. The Countryman, Vol. XXXVI, No. 2, Summer 1948
- 'Plunkett, Sir Horace Curzon (1854–1932)'. Dictionary of National Biography, 1931–1940 Supplement (Oxford University Press)
- 'Horace Plunkett'. Library Review, Vol. 14, No. 8 (1954), pp. 478–482
