= George Finlay (disambiguation) =

George Finlay (1799–1875) was a British historian.

George Finlay or Findlay may also refer to:

- George Finlay (Texas politician) in Eighteenth Texas Legislature
- George Findlay (railway manager) (1829–1893), British railwayman
- George Findlay (1889–1967), Scottish recipient of the Victoria Cross
- George Finlay (priest), Irish Anglican priest
