= Jeanie Bell =

Australian linguist

Jeanie Bell (1949 – 12 May 2024) was an Australian linguist. She was an Indigenous Research Collaborations Fellow in Indigenous Languages and Linguistics at Batchelor Institute of Indigenous Tertiary Education. She has made substantial contributions to the development of Aboriginal tertiary education, and to the preservation of Indigenous Australian languages.

== Biography ==
Jeanie Bell is a Jagera and Dulingbara woman born in south-east Queensland, and grew up in Brisbane. After leaving school, she moved to Melbourne, Victoria, and attended Monash University. After graduating from Monash, she spent three years teaching linguistics at the Yipirinya school in Alice Springs, Northern Territory, training Aboriginal interpreters for the Institute of Aboriginal Development, and editing two books for the Aboriginal Languages Association. She also taught Indigenous Australian language studies at the North Queensland Institute of TAFE in Cairns. In 1984 she was appointed Lecturer in Aboriginal Studies at the Northern Rivers College of Advanced Education in New South Wales, and in 1985 she became the first coordinator of the Aboriginal and Islander Studies Unit at the University of Queensland. After this role, she returned to Alice Springs and worked at the Institute for Aboriginal Development as acting assistant director.

In 1988, Bell became a member of the National Aboriginal and Islander Education Policy Task Force. In 1990, she undertook research for the Royal Commission into Aboriginal Deaths in Custody. She has also been part of the Research Committee at the Australian Institute of Aboriginal and Torres Strait Islander Studies, and between 2004 and 2005, she worked as a linguist and researcher for the Victorian Aboriginal Corporation for Languages, based in Melbourne.

She received a master's degree in Linguistics from The University of Melbourne for her 2003 sketch grammar of the Badjala language, a variety of Gabi-Gabi spoken on Fraser Island (K'gari) on the southern coast of Queensland. She was closely involved in language revitalisation work focusing on Badjala and Yagara languages, and was involved in research on kinship and marriage in Aboriginal communities as part of a PhD at the Australian National University. Her contributions to Indigenous language maintenance and revitalisation were recognised, along with those of other founding members of the Aboriginal Languages Association, at a 2012 NAIDOC event hosted by Governor General Quentin Bryce. In 1993, she was one of six Indigenous Australians who jointly presented the Boyer Lectures for the International Year of the World's Indigenous People (IYWIP). A scholarship exists in her name for Indigenous PhD students at the Bachelor Institute, to further her legacy in the field of transcultural knowledge creation.

Bell passed away in an aged care home near Caboolture on 12 May 2024.

== Key publications ==
- (2007) Bell, J. Why we do what we do! Reflections of an Aboriginal linguist working on the maintenance and revival of ancestral languages. Ngoonjook: a Journal of Australian Indigenous Issues (no. 30): 12-18.
- (2003). Bell, J. Australia's Indigenous Languages. Ch. 12 in Blacklines, Melbourne University Press.
- (2003) Bell, J. A sketch grammar of the Badjala language of Gari (Fraser Island). Masters Thesis, University of Melbourne.
- (1995) Bell, J. Working on a dictionary for Murri languages. pp 1-9 in Nicholas Thieberger (ed.). Paper and Talk, A manual for reconstituting materials in Australian indigenous languages from historical sources Canberra: AIATSIS.
- (1994) Bell, J. 'Dictionary of the Gubbi Gubbi and Butchella Languages' with assistance from Amanda Seed.
