= George Finlay (priest) =

Irish priest

George Finlay was an Irish Anglican priest in the late nineteenth and early twentieth centuries: he was Archdeacon of Clogher from 1886 until 1903.

Finlay was educated at Trinity College, Dublin and ordained in 1853. He served curacies at Fahan, Templeport, Lower Langfield and Collon. He was the incumbent at Drumcar from 1861 until 1873;"Clogher clergy and parishes : being an account of the clergy of the Church of Ireland in the Diocese of Clogher, from the earliest period, with historical notices of the several parishes, churches, etc" Leslie, J.B. p49: Enniskille; R. H. Ritchie; 1929 and Aghabog from 1873 to 1886.

In 1903 Finlay was put forward to be the next Bishop of Clogher, but was not elected.
