= Edward Maginn =

Irish Catholic priest

Edward Maginn (b. at Fintona, Ireland, 16 December 1802; d. at Derry, 17 January 1849) was an Irish Catholic priest, an advocate of Catholic Emancipation, and supporter of Daniel O'Connell in the Repeal movement. He became coadjutor bishop of Derry.

== Life ==
He was the son of Patrick Maginn, a farmer, and his wife, Mary Slevin. He was educated by his uncle, parish priest of Monaghan, and later by Thomas MacColgan, at Buncrana, Donegal, and entered the Irish College, Paris, in 1818.

He was ordained in 1825 at Derry, and was soon appointed curate of Moville, where he remained till 1829, becoming known as a preacher. He opposed the efforts made by the Episcopalians body to proselytize his flock, and took a prominent part in a public controversy held at Derry concerning Catholic doctrines, a report of which was published later in book form (Dublin, 1828).

In 1829 he became parish priest of Fahan, and applied himself to the suppression of agrarian secret societies, while appealing to the Government to protect the peasantry against the abuse of power by the local non-Catholic magistrates. He endeavoured to heal the breach between the Young Irelanders and Daniel O'Connell. He accepted the "national school" system, and by his protests prevented the withdrawal of the schools from clerical control. He repudiated the Queen's Colleges, and helped to bring about their condemnation at Rome. He was an advocate the establishment of a Catholic university, which, however, he did not live to see.

On 18 January 1846 he was consecrated titular Bishop of Orthosia, and coadjutor to Dr. John McLaughlin of Derry. Seized with typhus fever on 14 January 1849, he died three days later in St. Columb's College and was buried at Buncrana, Donegal.

Maginn was an important factor in the rehabilitation of the Catholic Church in Ulster after Emancipation. His letters on land and the Poor Law administration, together with his evidence before the Devon Commission (Report published at Dublin, 1847), contain valuable information on the social condition of Ireland in the first half of the nineteenth century. The conduct of government officials during the Irish Famine of 1847-49 inspired him with an abhorrence of English misrule. A series of letters was in reply to Lord Stanley, who in the House of Lords, 23 November 1847, had accused the Irish Catholic clergy of using the confessional to encourage lawlessness and crime ("Refutation of Lord Stanley's Calumnies against the Catholic Clergy of Ireland", reprint, Dublin, 1850).
