= Fahan =

Village in County Donegal, Ireland

Fahan Fathain Mura
- Village
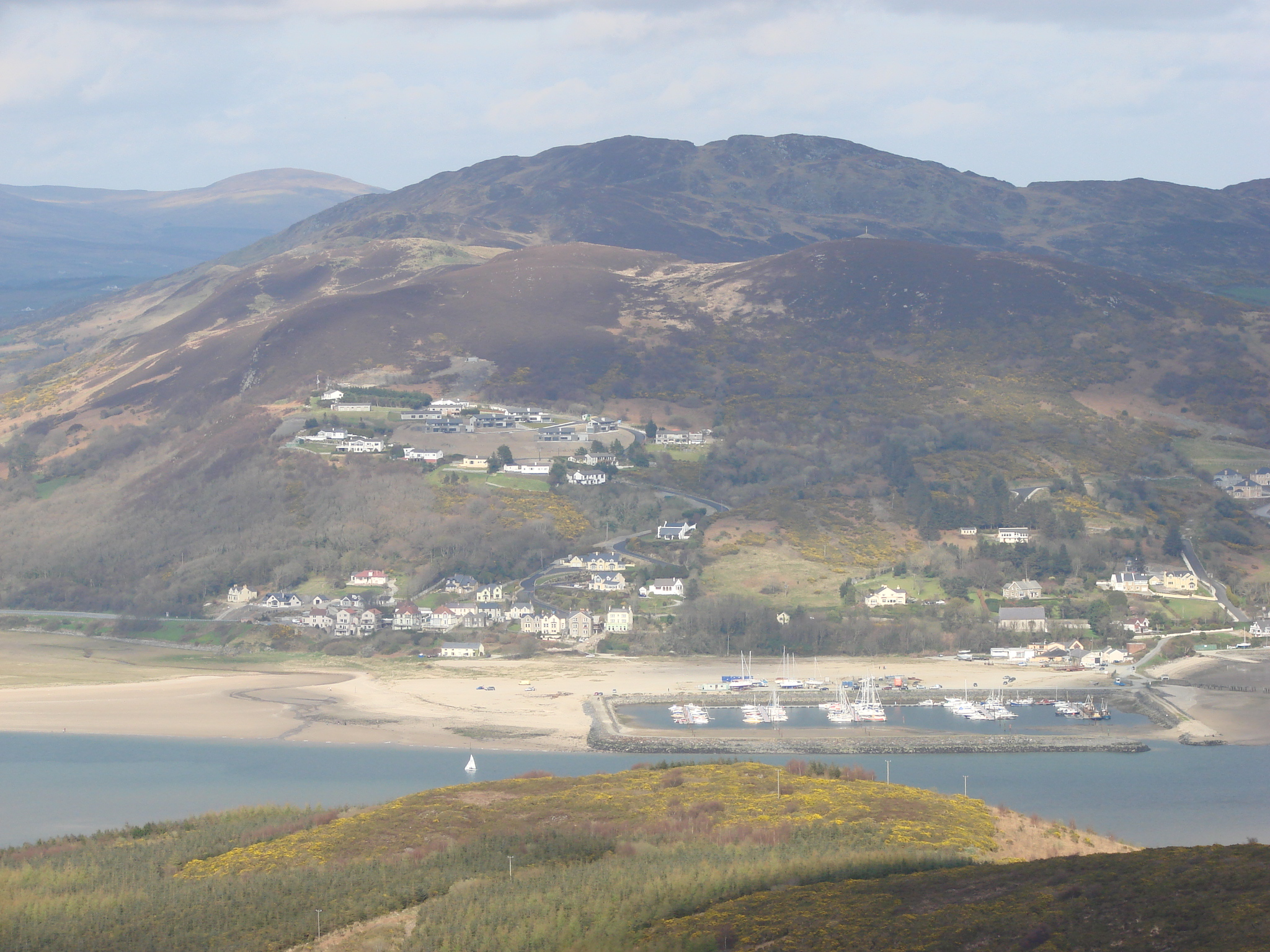
- Fahan from Inch Top

- Location in Ireland
- Coordinates: 55°05′20″N 7°28′42″W
- Country: Ireland
- Province: Ulster
- County: County Donegal

Population (2022)
  - Total: 589
- Time zone: UTC+0 (WET)
  - Summer (DST): UTC-1 (IST (WEST))

Fahan (/fɔːn/; pronounced 'Fawn'. Irish: Fathain Mura, meaning 'little green/field of Mura') is a district of Inishowen in the north of County Donegal, Ireland, located 5 km (3 mi) south of Buncrana. In Irish, Fahan is named after its patron saint, Saint Mura, first abbot of Fahan, an early Christian monastery.

== History ==
The walled graveyard, located west of the rectory, contains the grave of pioneering nurse Agnes Jones, the ruins of a 6th-century monastery featuring a 7th-century cross-slab of St. Mura, and the ruins of a 16th-century monastery and 17th-century church together with a number of grave slabs bearing coats of arms. The monastery and village were sacked by Vikings in the 10th and 13th centuries. Medieval mill wheels are built into both the graveyard wall and the wall on the opposite side of the road.

Cecil Frances Alexander lived in the old rectory in the late 19th century. Her contemporary, Agnes Jones, trained with Florence Nightingale and served as a nurse in the Crimean War. Agnes Jones was born in Cambridge, England. Edward Maginn, a 19th-century bishop, served as a parish priest in Fahan. The church to the north of the rectory contains an early 20th-century stained-glass window by Evie Hone which depicts St. Elizabeth of Hungary.

== Transport ==
Fahan railway station, which opened on 9 September 1864, closed for passenger traffic on 6 September 1948. It finally ceased operation on 10 August 1953.

Fahan is served by the McGonagle Bus Company, with a stop on the route between Buncrana and Derry.

== Notable people ==
- W. G. S. Adams, political scientist and public servant
- William Alexander, Primate of All Ireland
- General Sir Andrew Barnard, British military commander
- Paul Colton, Church of Ireland Bishop of Cork
- Peter Cunnah, from Derry, now resident in Fahan; former lead singer with D:Ream
- George Downame, Bishop of Derry and writer on philosophical and religious subjects
- George Finlay, priest who served as Archdeacon of Clogher
- Niall Frossach, King of Ailech
- Agnes Jones, nurse
- Johnny McCauley, singer-songwriter
- Saint Mura
- Máel Muire Othain, poet
- Andrew Simpson, actor
- Sir St Clair Thomson, surgeon

== Gallery ==
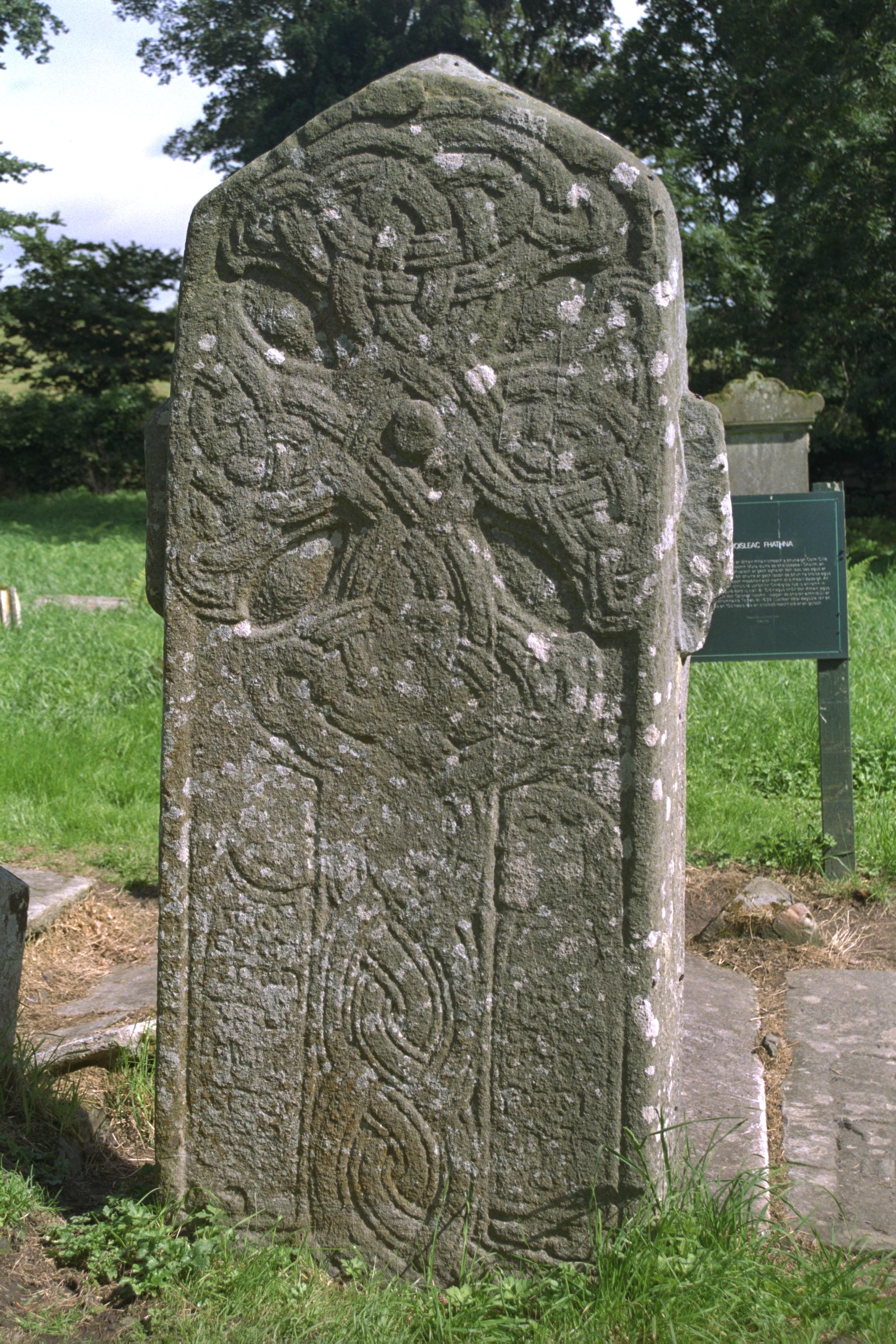
St. Mura Cross Slab from the 7th century

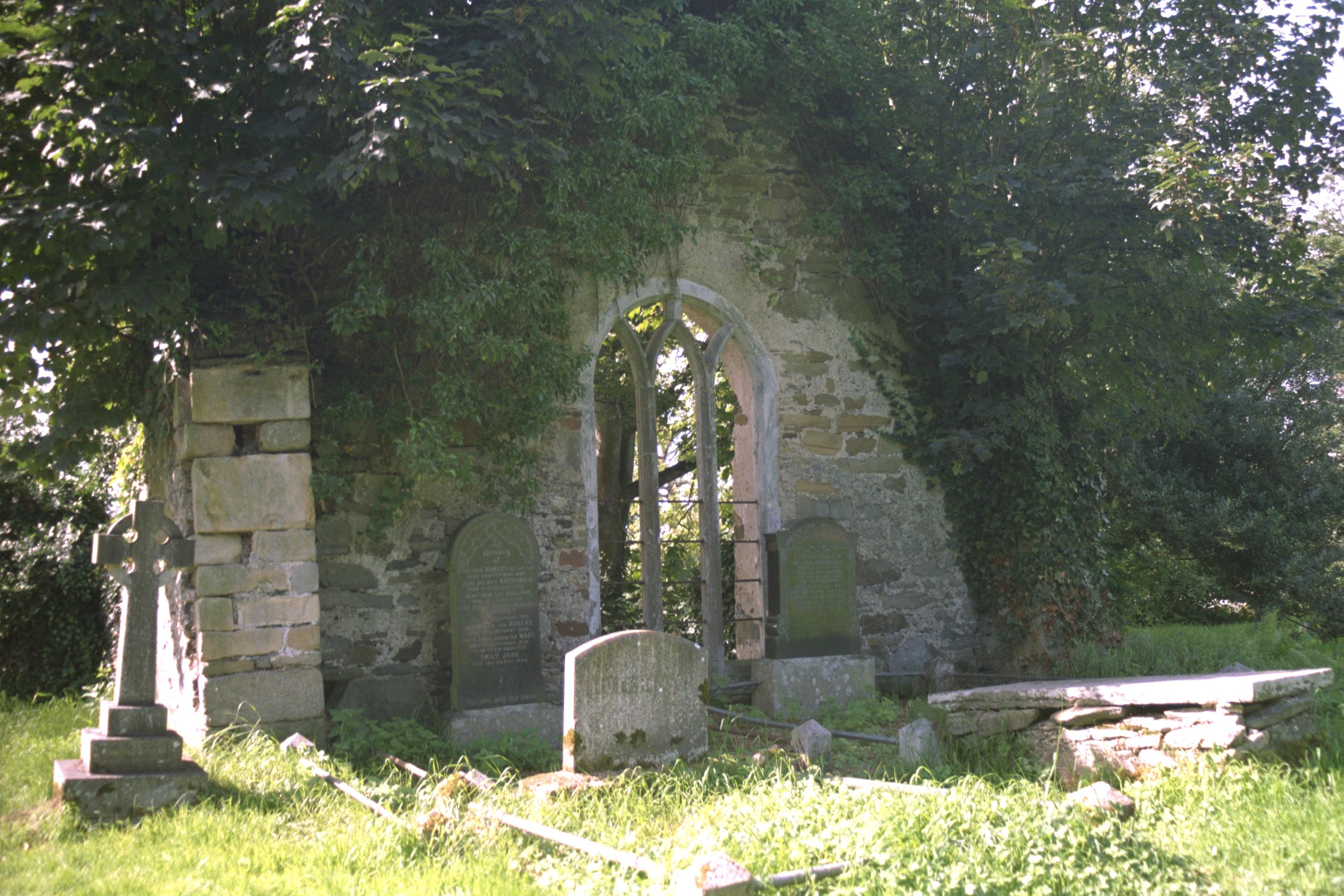
Old church from the 17th century

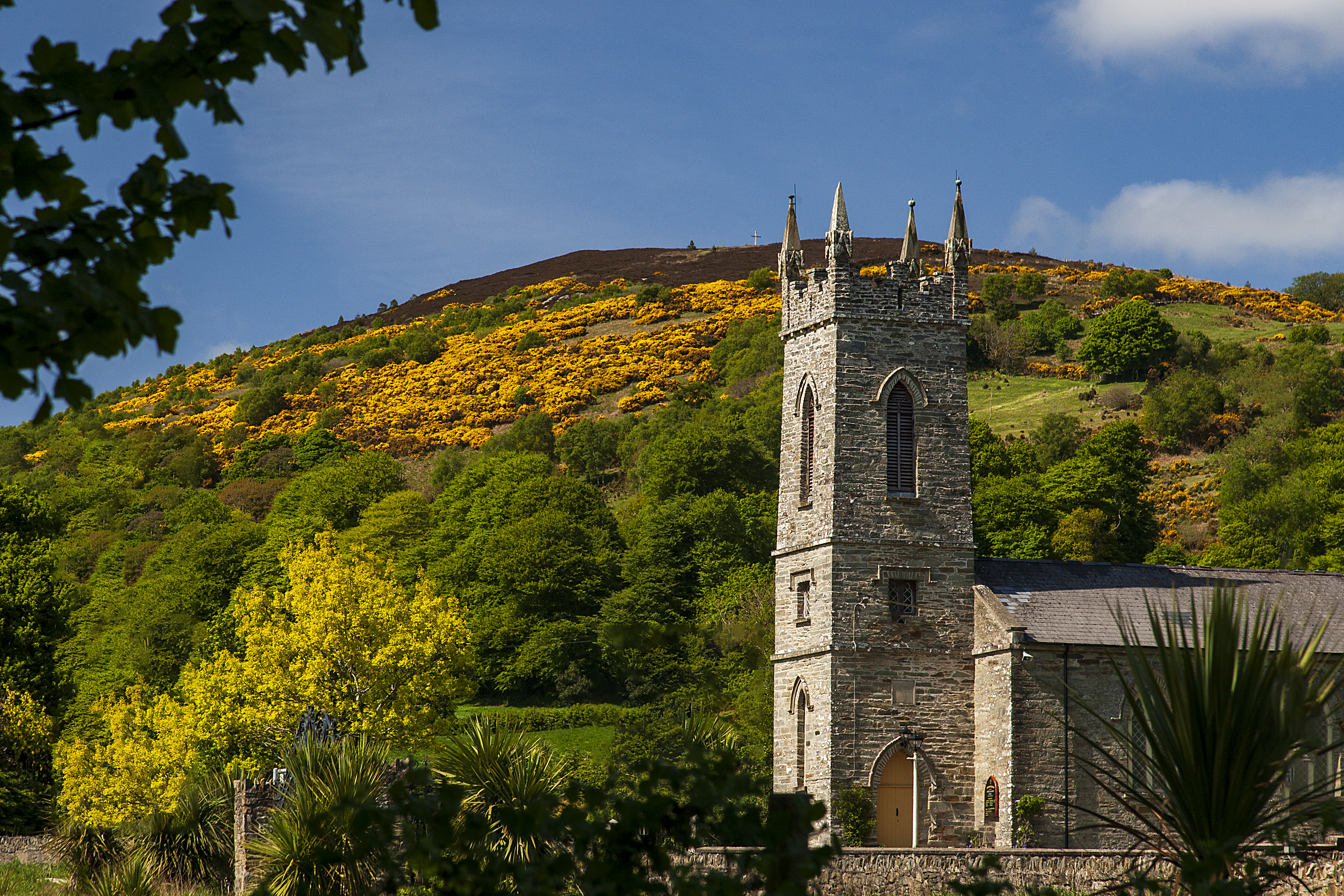
St Mura's Church

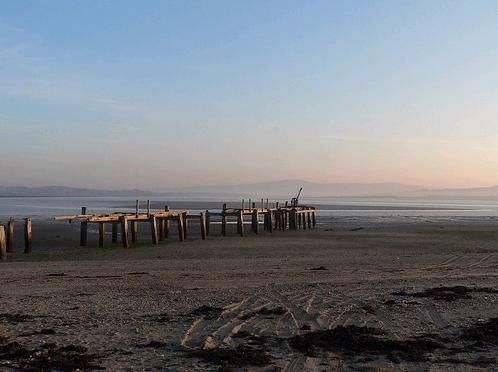
Fahan beach

== See also ==
- List of populated places in Ireland
- List of abbeys and priories in Ireland (County Donegal)
