= Dexter Dunphy =

Australian academic

Dexter Dunphy AM FASSA
- Born: 1934 (age 91–92)

Dexter Colboyd Dunphy AM FASSA, (born 1934) is an Australian academic.

== Education ==
Dunphy obtained a Dip Ed, and BA and M Ed degrees at the University of Sydney and a PhD in sociology at Harvard University.

== Career ==
Dunphy joined the faculty of the University of New South Wales. Dunphy later joined the faculty of University of Technology Sydney.

In 1972, Dunphy delivered the annual series of Australian Broadcasting Corporation Boyer Lectures on "The Challenge of Change".

== Honours and awards ==
Dunphy was appointed a Member of the Order of Australia in 2007 for "service to education, particularly in the fields of organisational change, corporate sustainability and business management, and to the community". He was elected a Fellow of the Academy of the Social Sciences in Australia in 2001.
