= Saint Mura =

Abbot of the monastery at Fahan, County Donegal, Ireland

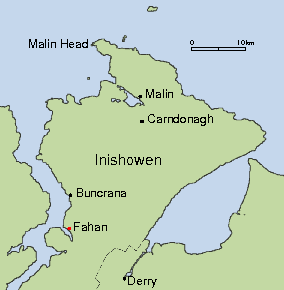
Map of Inishowen Peninsula, including Fahan.

Saint Mura (c. 550–645) was the first abbot of the monastery at Fahan, County Donegal, Ireland. Until around 800, his monastery was the main ecclesiastical sight for rulers of the Inishowen peninsula and genealogically, Saint Mura has been linked to the Dál Fiatach group. There is no hagiography or 'life' of Saint Mura, however there were some notes assembled about St. Mura in the Acta sanctorum Hiberniae which provides preliminary information on the saint. He is the patron saint of Fahan and his feast day is March 12, which is the date that is largely accepted as his death date.

There is little known about Saint Mura's family history, however there is information on the dynastic groups he is linked to, as well as several saint siblings. The information related to this saint that remains is largely archeological evidence. This evidence is either from the period of Saint Mura, or objects that were made later and dedicated to him. Saint Mura's well remains on the site of his monastery in Fahan. His cross is near the ruins of the monastery in Fahan and dates to the 8th century. It stands over 6 foot tall and the west face of the cross has a complex triple banded interlace relief. St. Mura's crosier is currently held in the National Museum of Ireland, Dublin. Finally, the bell shrine of Saint Mura is in the Wallace Collection in London.

Saint Mura has remained relevant in the modern period. There is currently two modern churchs dedicated to Saint Mura in Fahan, County Donegal, Ireland.

== Hagiography Information ==
Hagiographies are religious texts written to record the life of a saint, typically in an idealized fashion which reflects beliefs of the catholic church. Although these texts typically reflect the beliefs the church wishes to project, it also provides information on the specific saint. Because there is not a surviving hagiography for Saint Mura, many dates such as birth, establishment of abbey, and death are estimated. Additionally, descriptions of miracles are included in hagiographies and therefore any miracles of Saint Mura remain unknown.

== Family History ==
There is little known about Saint Mura's family, however St. Mura is thought to not be the only saint from his lineage as his mother, Deirinnill Cheathairchíochach, is believed to have given birth to five saints. Three of these five are recorded as Cilléan of Achadh Caol, Mochuma of Drumbo, and Domhanghart of Slieve Donard. On his paternal side, Saint Mura is also recorded as the son of Fearadhach and is associated with the Ceinéal Eoghain northern Irish dynasty from the 400s, as well as the Dál Fiatach dynasty.

== Church of Saint Mura at Fahan, Ireland ==
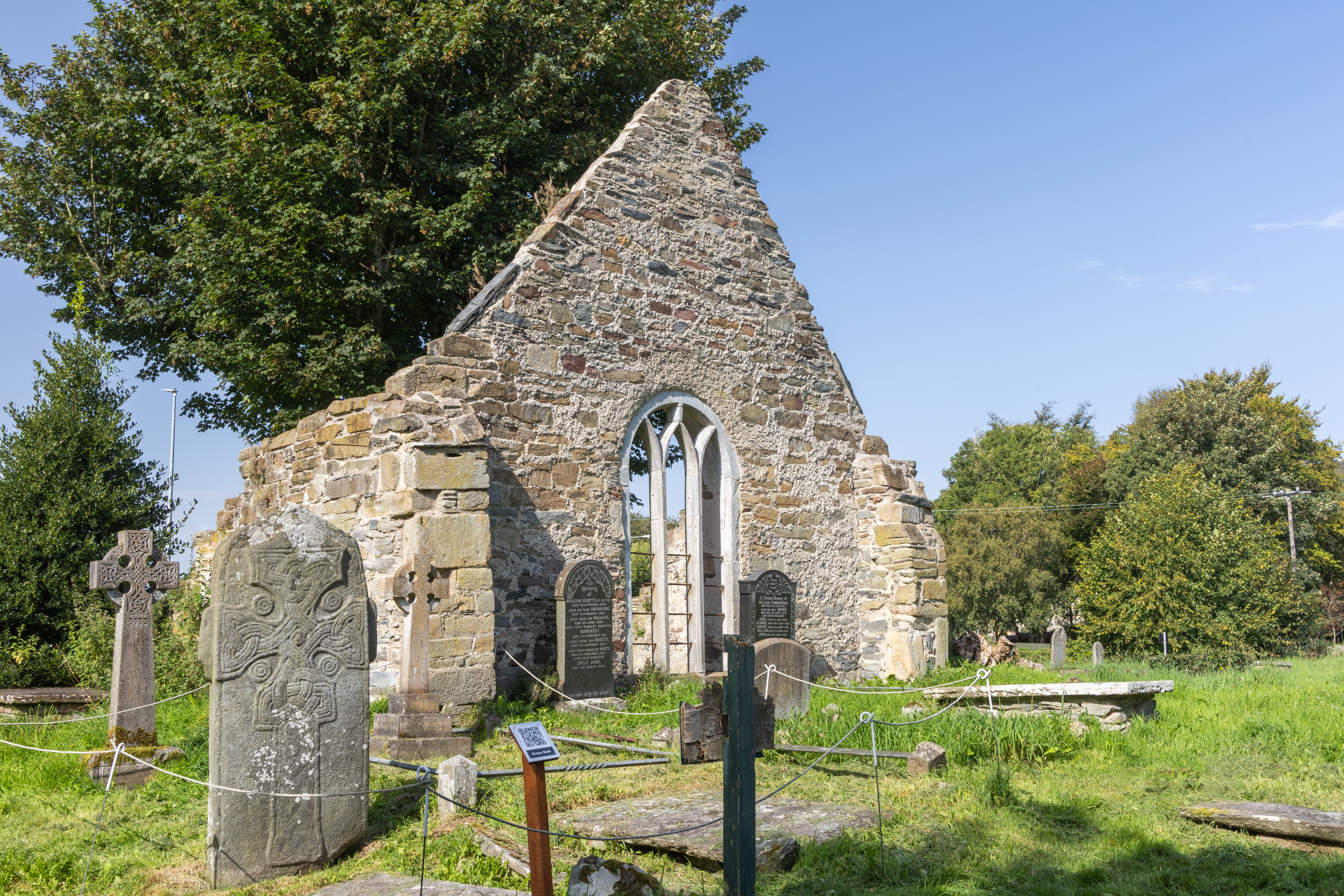
Ruins of St. Mura in Fahan, with the cross slab.

The church of Saint Mura can take on three different meanings. This could refer to the church ruins in Fahan, Ireland which were built on top of the Abbey established by St. Mura himself. On this site there is St. Mura's cross slab as well as St. Mura's well. However, off site but nonetheless associated with him is St. Mura's bell and Crozier. Additionally, the church of Saint Mura can refer to the two modern churchs in Fahan, including a Roman Catholic Church and a Church of Ireland.

=== Saint Mura's Church Ruins ===
Saint Mura's ruins are one of the oldest surviving ecclesiastical sites in the Inishowen peninsula in northern Ireland. At his church ruins is a graveyard, which has surviving gravemarkers from the last three centiures. The ruins at Fahan today were built in the 1600s and were built on top of the Abbey established by Saint Mura.

St. Mura's Cross Slab at Fahan.

=== Saint Mura's Cross Slab ===
Saint Mura's cross slab can be found in the graveyard next to Saint Mura's church ruins. The artistic style of St. Mura's cross slab was influenced by local artists in the Clonmacnois area. The stone is over two meters tall, is decorated with ribbon interlace, and has a Greek inscription of the holy trinity on one side. Scholars have considered if this Greek inscription could indicate a connection between the monks at the time and the Mediterranean. The outline of the cross is square shaped, rather than circular, and the type of interlace used on the stone provides evidence of its early dating. As of 2022, this stone is in danger of eroding and the Fahan Heritage Group was raising funds to support its preservation.

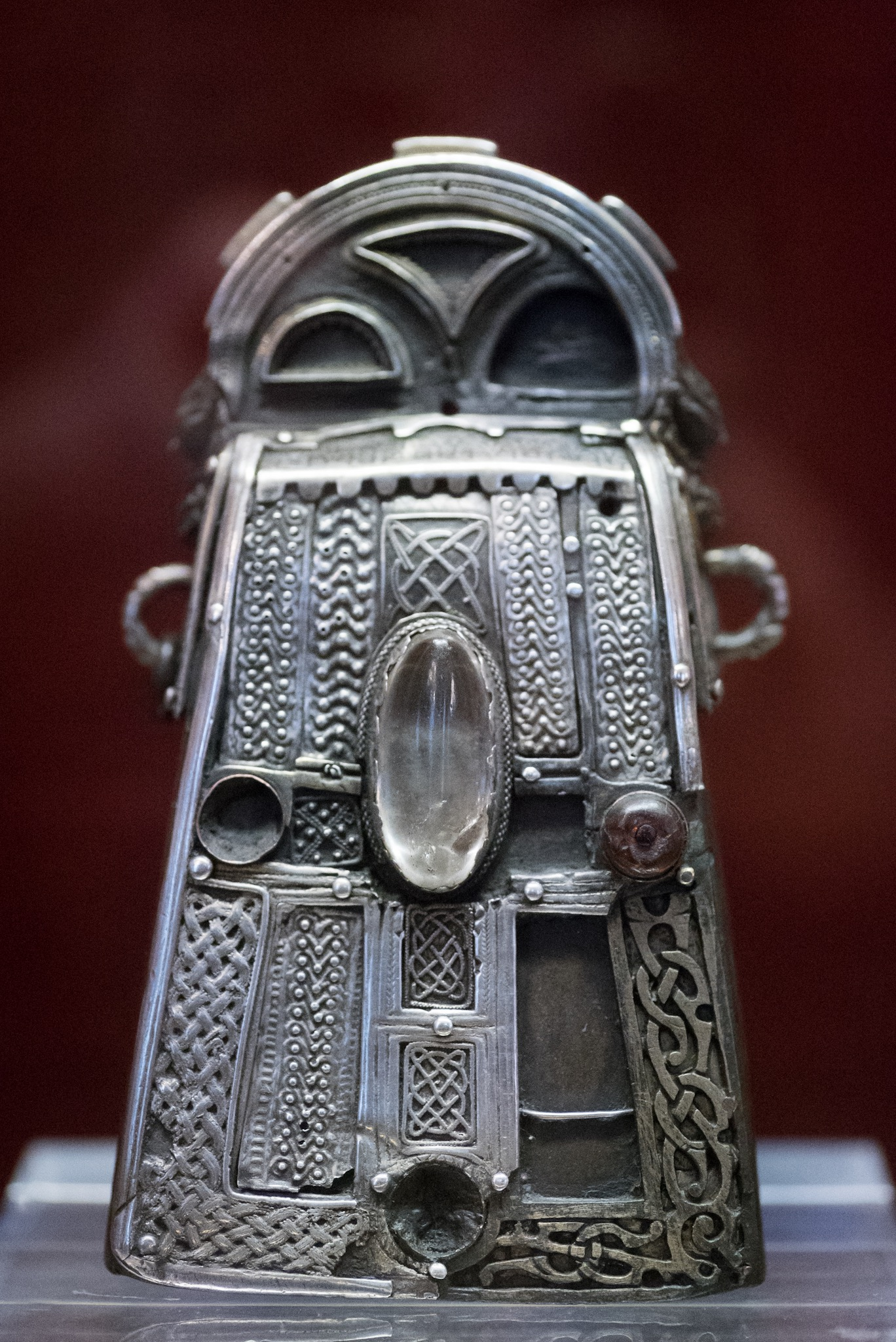
The Bell Shrine of St. Mura is housed in the Wallace Collection in London.

=== Saint Mura's Well ===
The well that sits near st. Mura's ruins in Fahan is thought to have curative purposes, however none survive on record. Although there is little record of the powers of saint Mura, one miracle links the drinking of water at st. Mura's site to a prophecy which predicted the future king of Ireland. Around the well are surviving remains of a redbrick which was added in the 19th century as a protective addition and is not an original installation during st. Mura's time.

=== Saint Mura's Bell ===
The bell shrine of Saint Mura are housed in the Wallace Collection in London and are made of bronze, brass, and silver. This bell could have been used for time keeping purposes, rung at meal times, or for religious purposes. This bell was made in stages, with the body of the bell believed to have been made during the 7th century, and more additions added up until the 11th century.

Saint Mura's Crozier in the National Museum of Ireland.

=== Saint Mura's Crozier ===
There is little known of Saint Mura's Crozier, but it is a staff that was originally dated to the 7th century but was later dated to the 20th century and is currently held at the National Museum of Ireland in Dublin. Crozier staffs are rods with a curved head and are typically used by bishops for a ceremonial purpose and is a symbol of power.

=== Modern St. Mura Church at Fahan ===
Saint Mura's church of Ireland.

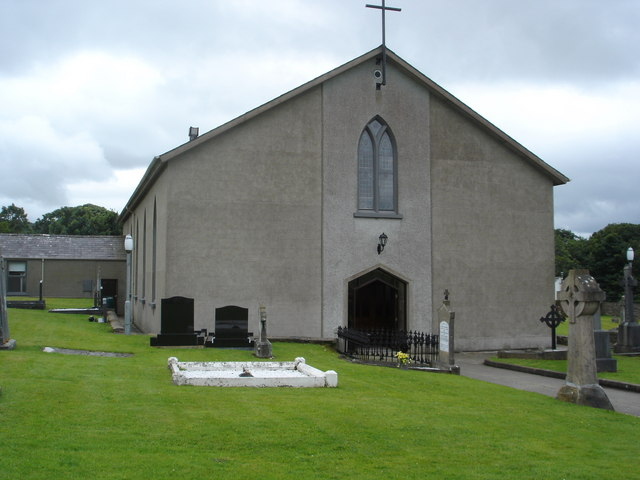
Saint Mura's Roman Catholic in Fahan.

There is currently two churchs in Fahan dedicated to Saint Mura. One is a Roman Catholic church, and the other is a church of Ireland. The Church of Ireland was built and expaneded during the 1800s, which acted as a replacement to an earlier 17th century church nearby.
