= Boyer Lectures =

Lecture series hosted by the Australian Broadcasting Corporation

The Boyer Lectures are a series of talks by prominent Australians, presenting ideas on major social, scientific, or cultural issues, and broadcast on ABC Radio National. The series is broadcast every year in between September and December on ABC Radio National.

== History ==
The Boyer Lectures began in 1959 as the ABC (Australian Broadcasting Commission, now the Australian Broadcasting Corporation) Lectures. They were modelled on the BBC's Reith Lectures, and renamed in 1961 after Richard Boyer (later Sir Richard), the ABC board chairman who had first suggested the lectures.

== Description ==
The lectures are delivered by prominent Australians selected by the Australian Broadcasting Corporation's Board, intended to stimulate thought, discussion and debate in Australia on a wide range of subjects, examining key issues and values. The series is broadcast every year in between September and December on ABC Radio National.

== Lectures ==
=== 1950s ===
- 1959 – Dr David Forbes Martyn – "Society in the Space Age"

1. "World Inherited"
2. "World in Transformation"
3. "Other Worlds"
4. "World of Tomorrow"

=== 1960s ===
- 1960 – Prof Julius Stone – "Law and Policy in the Quest for Survival"

1. "Is There a Rule of Law Between Nations?"
2. "Judgement and Survival"
3. "Law Force and Survival"
4. "Outlawry and Revolution in the Relations of States"
5. "International Law and the Price of Survival"
6. "What Can We Do to Survive"

- 1961 – Prof W. D. Borrie – "The Crowding World"

1. "The Vital Revolution"
2. "Western Man's Victory Over Death"
3. "Births, Deaths and Poverty"
4. "The Future"

- 1962 – Prof W. G. K. Duncan – "In Defence of the Common Man"

- "Should Government be Left in the Hands of Experts"
- "What Type of Leadership is Needed in a Democracy"
- "How Should We Encourage Such Leadership?"
- "The Great Beast or the Great Audience?"

- 1963 – Prof J. D. B. Miller – "Australian and Foreign Policy"

1. "The Limitations of Foreign Policy"
2. "The Problem of National Interest"
3. "Ideology, Trade, Defence"
4. "Party Traditions"
5. "Diplomacy and the Public"

- 1964 – George Ivan Smith – "Along the Edge of Peace"

1. "The House with the Golden Key"
2. "The Human Factor at Work in the World"
3. "The Golden Eggs"
4. "The International Civil Servant"
5. "Australia and the World"

- 1965 – Prof Sir John Eccles – "The Brain and the Person"

1. "Conscious Experience"
2. "Knowing Our World and Acting In It"
3. "The Brain in Consciousness and Learning"
4. "The Evolution of the Brain and the Possibility of Intelligent Life Elsewhere in the Universe"
5. "The Unity of Conscious Experience

- 1966 – Sir Macfarlane Burnet – "Biology and the Appreciation of Life"

1. "The Beginnings of Science"
2. "The Pasteurian Revolution"
3. "The Darwinian Approach"
4. "The Ethics of a Biologist"
5. "Education for Life"

- 1967 – Robin Boyd – "Artificial Australia"

1. "Creative Man in a Frontier Society
2. "The Architecture of Ideas"
3. "Integrity in the Artificial Object"
4. "The Environmental Arts in Australia"
5. The Australian Myth in the Modern World

- 1968 – Prof W. E. H. Stanner "After the Dreaming"

1. "Looking Back"
2. "The Great Australian Silence"
3. "The Appreciation of Difference"
4. "Confrontation"
5. "Composition"

- 1969 – Sir Zelman Cowen "The Private Man"

1. "The Right to be Let Alone"
2. "The Goldfish Bowl"
3. "The Clandestine Observer"
4. "The Computer and the Dossier"
5. "The Beleagured Private Man

=== 1970s ===
- 1970 – Dr H. C. Coombs – "The Fragile Pattern—Institutions and Man"

1. "Institutions Maketh Man"
2. "Are Good Intentions Enough"
3. "Is Man Another Crown of Thorns"
4. "Shall We Join the Dropouts"
5. "The Measure is Man

- 1971 – Prof Basil Hetzel – "Life and Health in Australia"

- "Health and Community Action"

- 1972 – Prof Dexter Dunphy – "The Challenge of Change"

1. "Riders in the Chariot"
2. "The Searching Self"
3. "The World of Work"
4. "Principalities and Power"
5. "Designing Utopias"

- 1973 – Prof Sir Keith Hancock – "Today, Yesterday and Tomorrow"

- "Pollution"
- "A Little Lower than the Angels"

- 1974 – Hugh Stretton – "Housing & Government"

1. "The Conventional Wisdom"
2. "Home Economics—How People Use Space and Time"
3. "How to be Free and Equal and Productive"
4. "A National Housing Policy"

- 1975 – Dame Roma Mitchell – "The Web of Criminal Law"

1. "Protection"
2. "Apprehension"
3. "Prosecution"
4. "Reparation"
5. "Rehabilitation"

- 1976 – Manning Clark – "A Discovery of Australia"

1. "Being an Historian"
2. "Having Something to Say" Part One
3. "Having Something to Say" Part Two
4. "Collecting the Material"
5. "Telling the Story"

- 1977 – Douglas Stewart – "Writers of The Bulletin"

1. "JF Archibald's Paper"
2. "The Bulletin as I Knew It"
3. "Ronald McCuaig's Poetry"
4. "Books of the Bulletin—Part 1—AG Stephens to SH Prior"
5. "Books of the Bulletin—Part 2—The Endeavour Press and After"

- 1978 – Sir Gustav Nossal – "Nature's Defences—New Frontiers in Vaccine Research"

1. "Vaccines and History"
2. "Strategies of the Cellular Defence System"
3. "Diseases due to Civil Warfare"
4. "Immunology and Cancer"
5. "Immunology and Genetics"

- 1979 – Bob Hawke – "The Resolution of Conflict"

1. "How We Are Governed" Part One
2. "How We Are Governed" Part Two
3. "Australia in Crisis" Part One
4. "Australia in Crisis" Part Two
5. "The International Context"

=== 1980s ===
- 1980 – Bernard Smith – "The Spectre of Truganini"

1. "The Ethical Roots of Culture"
2. "The Mechanism of Forgetfulness"
3. "The Concerned Conscience"
4. "Black Voices"
5. "A Cultural Conveyence?"

- 1981 – Prof John Passmore – "The Limits of Government"

1. "The General Problem"
2. "Coercion"
3. "Protection"
4. "Subsidisation"
5. "Conclusions and Reflections"

- 1982 – Prof Sir Bruce Williams – "Living with Technology"

1. "Dynamic Technology"
2. "Technological Employment and Unemployment"
3. "Education Skills and the Working Life"
4. "Run Over by Technology?"
5. "Possible Futures"

- 1983 – Justice Michael Kirby – "The Judges"

1. "Behind the Curtain"
2. "Selection, Training, Function"
3. "Judicial Method"
4. "Human Error and Human Frailty"
5. "Judges as Reformers"
6. "The Future?"

- 1984 – Shirley Hazzard – "Coming of Age in Australia"

1. "An Air of Disbelief"
2. "Into the Mainstream"
3. "Australia and the Menace of Eternal Youth"
4. "To Live Without an Enemy"

- 1985 – Helen Hughes – "Australia in a Developing World"

1. "The Global Background"
2. "The Right to Work"
3. "The Role of Government"
4. "A People and an Environment"
5. "Policies for Progress"

- 1986 – Prof Eric Willmot – "Australia—The Last Experiment"

1. "A Different Genesis"
2. "The Embedded Dolls"
3. "The Dragon of the New Eden"
4. "Lushy Country Dreaming"
5. "A Rational Differential"
6. "A Choice of Destinies"

- 1987 – Davis McCaughey – "Piecing Together a Shared Vision" (multicultural Australia)

1. "Who Are We?"
2. "Something Beyond Ourselves"
3. "Professions and Conventions: A Matter of Trust
4. "Ourselves Writ Strange"
5. "Some Larger Love or Loyalty"

- 1988 – "Postscripts: eight previous Boyer lecturers revisit their lectures"
- 1989 – Max Charlesworth – "Life, Death, Genes and Ethics"

1. "New Ways of Birth"
2. "New Ways of Dying"
3. "The Ethics of the Genes"
4. "Bioethics: Committees, Expers and the Community"
5. "Controlling the Biotechnological Genie"

=== 1990s ===
- 1990 – Tom Fitzgerald – "Between Life and Economics"

1. "Early Perspectives on Life"
2. "Economics, Broad and Narrow"
3. "Japan in Fact and in Theory"
4. "Capital Disaster"
5. "Canberra's Manufacturing Capacity"
6. "No Dialectic"

- 1991 – Fay Gale and Ian Lowe – "Changing Australia"

- Lectures by Fay Gale

1. "Change in Universities—Evolution or Revolution"
2. "Equity—It is a Cover for Uniformity?"
3. "Technology-driven Education"

- Lectures by Ian Lowe

1. "The Search for the Engine of Change"
2. "Who's Paying the Driver?"
3. "Change and our Future"

- 1992 – Geoffrey Bolton – "A View From the Edge: An Australian Stocktaking"

1. "Human Resources"
2. "Resourceful Humans"
3. "The Belly and the Limbs"
4. "Australoedipus"
5. "International Debits and Credits"
6. "Taking Stock: The Choices Before Us"

- 1993 – Presented by seven Indigenous Australians in the International Year of the World's Indigenous Peoples – "Voices of the Land"

1. Getano Lui Jnr – "A Torres Strait Perspective"
2. Dr Ian Anderson – "Towards a Koori Healing Practice"
3. Jeanie Bell – "Australia's Indigenous Languages"
4. Mandawuy Yunupingu – "Yothu Yindi–Finding Balance"
5. Dot West – "Indigenous Media"
6. Noel Pearson – "Mabo: Towards Respecting Equality and Difference"
7. Helen Corbett – "International Efforts"

- 1994 – Kerry Stokes – "Advance Australia Where?"

1. "Don't Shoot the Pigeons Just Yet"
2. "Evil Communications Corrupt Good Manners"
3. "Culture—It's Yoghurt for American"
4. "The Hand that Rocks the Cradle"
5. "Double Jeopardy: Double Expense"

- 1995 – Eva Cox – "A Truly Civil Society"

1. "Broadening the Viewing Points"
2. "Raising Social Capital"
3. "The Dark Side of the Warm Inner Glow: Family and Communitarians"
4. "The Companionable State"
5. "Change, Diversity and Dissent"
6. "A Utopian Road Movie"

- 1996 – Prof Pierre Ryckmans – "The View from the Bridge—Aspects of Culture"

1. "Learning"
2. "Reading"
3. "Writing"
4. "Going Abroad and Staying Home"

- 1997 – Prof Martin Krygier – "Between Fear and Hope: Hybrid Thoughts on Public Views"

1. "Hybrids and Comparisons"
2. "Between Fear and Hope"
3. "The Uses of Civility"
4. "Pride, Shame and Decency"
5. "The Good That Governments Do"
6. "In Praise of Hybrid Thoughts"

- 1998 – David Malouf – "A Spirit of Play: The Making of Australian Consciousness"

1. "The Island"
2. "A Complex Fate"
3. "Landscapes"
4. "Monuments to Time"
5. "The Orphan in the Pacific"
6. "A Spirit of Play

- 1999 – Dr Inga Clendinnen – "True Stories"

1. "Incident on a Beach"
2. "Pilgrims, Stains and Sacred Places"
3. "Back to the Past: Victoria 1841"
4. "Arnhem Land 1931-7"
5. "Inside the Contact Zone: One and Two"
6. "What Now?"

=== 2000s ===
- 2000 – Chief Justice Murray Gleeson – "The Rule of Law and the Constitution"

1. "A Country Planted Thick with Laws"
2. "Becoming One People"
3. "Aspects of the Commonwealth Constitution"
4. "Constitutional Rights"
5. "The Keystone of the Federal Arch"
6. "The Judiciary"

- 2001 – Prof Geoffrey Blainey – "This Land is all Horizons: Australian Fears and Visions"
- 2002 – Ian Castles (Not delivered due to bereavement)
- 2003 – Owen Harries – "Benign or Imperial? Reflections on American Hegemony"
- 2004 – Peter Conrad – "Tales of Two Hemispheres"
- 2005 – Archbishop Peter Jensen – "The Future of Jesus"
- 2006 – Ian Macfarlane – "The Search For Stability"
- 2007 – Graeme Clark – "Restoring The Senses"
- 2008 – Rupert Murdoch – "A Golden Age of Freedom"
- 2009 – General Peter Cosgrove – "A Very Australian Conversation"

=== 2010s ===
- 2010 – Professor Glyn Davis – "The Republic of Learning: higher education transforms Australia"
- 2011 – Geraldine Brooks – "The Idea of Home"
- 2012 – Professor Marcia Langton – "The Quiet Revolution: Indigenous People and the Resources Boom"
- 2013 – Governor-General Quentin Bryce – "Back to Grassroots"
- 2014 – Professor Suzanne Cory – "The promise of science: a vision of hope"
- 2015 – Dr Michael Fullilove – "A larger Australia"
- 2016 – Professor Sir Michael Marmot – "Fair Australia: Social Justice and the Health Gap"
- 2017 – Professor Genevieve Bell – "Fast, Smart and Connected: What is it to be Human, and Australian, in a Digital World?"
- 2018 – Professor John Rasko – "Life Re-engineered"
- 2019 – Filmmaker Rachel Perkins – "The End of Silence"

=== 2020s ===
- 2020 – Philanthropist and business leader Dr Andrew Forrest AO – "Rebooting Australia: How ethical entrepreneurs can help shape a better future"
- 2021 – Actor John Bell – "Shakespeare: Soul of the Age"
- 2022 – Noel Pearson – "Who we were and who we can be"
- 2023 – Professor Michelle Simmons AO –

1. "The Atomic Revolution"
2. "The Quantum Promise"
3. "Imagination and Mindset"
4. "The Importance of Doubt"

- 2024 – Classical music in the contemporary age –

1. Professor Anna Goldsworthy, Kairos
2. Aaron Wyatt
3. Iain Grandage
4. Lyn Williams AM

- 2025 - Australia: A Radical Experiment in Democracy

1. Professor Justin Wolfers, "Australia is Freaking Amazing"
2. John Anderson, AO, "Our Civilisational Moment"
3. Professor Larissa Behrendt, "Justice, Ideas and Inclusion"

== See also ==
- History of the Australian Broadcasting Corporation
- Reith Lectures
- Massey Lectures
