= The Garden Suburb =

The Garden Suburb is the name given to a collection of ministerial positions created by the British Prime Minister David Lloyd George in December 1916, to help facilitate the running of World War I. They were housed in temporary wooden structures in the Garden of 10 and 11 Downing Street. Due to their contacts with the press, they were sometimes regarded with suspicion, and their ideas at times created trouble for the Cabinet Secretary Maurice Hankey, who was tasked not just with supervising the taking of minutes at War Cabinet meetings, but also with executing their decisions. Known as the Prime Minister's personal secretariat and private "brain trust", the Garden Suburb included the likes of Professor W. G. S. Adams, Lord Milner, Philip Kerr and Waldorf Astor.

In a 24 February 1917 article in The Nation, entitled, "The New Bureaucracy" H. W. Massingham described the Garden Suburb as:

"A little body of illuminati, whose residence is in the Prime Minister's garden, and their business to cultivate the Prime Minister's mind. These gentlemen stand in no sense for a Civil Service cabinet. They are rather the class of travelling empirics in Empire, who came in with Lord Milner, whose spiritual home is fixed somewhere between Balliol and Heidelburg. Their function is to emerge from their huts in Downing Street, like the competitors in a Chinese examination, with answers to our thousand questions of the Sphinx."

The references to Empire, Balliol and Heidelburg were made because of Lord Milner, a Balliol-educated, German-born staunch imperialist and loyal ally of Lloyd George, and member of the Prime Minister's War Cabinet. Milner had great influence in the selection of Garden Suburb members, resulting in the placement of some of his proteges from the time he was the High Commissioner for South Africa, from a group known as Milner's Kindergarten. It may have helped Lord Milner become the second most powerful man in Britain.

While the Prime Minister and his War Cabinet were initially confronted by problems with Greece, President Wilson's Peace Note, and Lloyd George's desire to expand the War beyond the Western Front, the Garden Suburb shouldered all peacetime duties, like military questions, foreign and colonial affairs, and labour matters. It was also responsible for new ideas and suggestions to make things run efficiently. Its founding members were W. G. S. Adams, David Davies, Joseph Davies, Philip Kerr and Waldorf Astor. In May 1917 Cecil Harmsworth joined, in June David Davies left, and in July Astor left.
