= Harold Laski =

English political theorist (1893–1950)

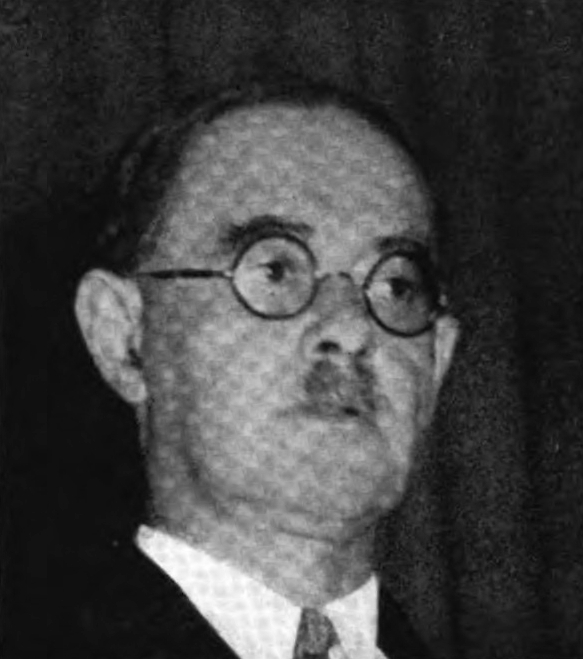

Chairman of the Labour Party
- In office 1945–1946
- Preceded by: Ellen Wilkinson
- Succeeded by: Philip Noel-Baker

Personal details
- Born: Harold Joseph Laski; 30 June 1893 Manchester, England
- Died: 24 March 1950 (aged 56) London, England
- Party: Labour
- Spouse: Frida Kerry (m. 1911)
- Occupation: Political theorist and economist

Academic background
- Education: New College, Oxford (BA)
- Influences: John Neville Figgis; Otto von Gierke; Frederic William Maitland; John Lewis Paton

Academic work
- Discipline: Economics; history; political science
- Sub-discipline: Political economy; political theory
- School or tradition: Marxism
- Institutions: London School of Economics
- Doctoral students: W. G. K. Duncan; Ralph Miliband; Franz Neumann; Abdur Razzaq; Robin Gollan
- Notable students: Leslie Goonewardene; Joseph P. Kennedy Jr.; Jawaharlal Nehru; C. B. Macpherson; V. K. Krishna Menon; K. R. Narayanan; Pierre Trudeau; Jyoti Basu; Lionel Robbins
- Notable works: A Grammar of Politics (1925)
- Influenced: Robert Dahl; Jawaharlal Nehru; Leo Strauss

Harold Joseph Laski (30 June 1893 – 24 March 1950) was an English political theorist and economist. He was active in politics and served as the chairman of the British Labour Party from 1945 to 1946 and was a professor at the London School of Economics from 1926 to 1950. He first promoted pluralism by emphasising the importance of local voluntary communities such as trade unions. After 1930, he began to emphasize the need for a workers' revolution, which he hinted might be violent. Laski's position angered Labour leaders who promised a nonviolent democratic transformation. Laski's position on democracy-threatening violence came under further attack from Prime Minister Winston Churchill in the 1945 UK general election, and the Labour Party had to disavow Laski, its own chairman.

Laski was one of Britain's most influential intellectual spokesmen for Marxism in the interwar years. In particular, his teaching greatly inspired students, some of whom later became leaders of the newly independent nations in Asia and Africa. He was perhaps the most prominent intellectual in the Labour Party, especially for those on the far left who shared his trust and hope in Joseph Stalin's Soviet Union; however, he was distrusted by the moderate Labour politicians who were in charge, such as Prime Minister Clement Attlee, and he was never given a major government position or a peerage.

Born to a Jewish family, Laski was also a supporter of Zionism and supported the creation of a Jewish state.

== Early life ==
Harold Laski was born in Manchester on 30 June 1893 to Nathan and Sarah Laski. Nathan Laski was a Lithuanian Jewish cotton merchant from Brest-Litovsk in what is now Belarus, as well as a local leader of the Liberal Party, while his mother was born in Manchester to Polish Jewish parents. He had a disabled sister, Mabel, who was one year younger. His elder brother was Neville Laski (the father of Marghanita Laski), and his cousin Neville Blond was the founder of the Royal Court Theatre and the father of the author and publisher Anthony Blond.

Laski attended the Manchester Grammar School. In 1911, he studied eugenics under Karl Pearson for six months at University College London (UCL). The same year, he met and married Frida Kerry, a lecturer of eugenics. His marriage to Frida, a Gentile and eight years his senior, antagonised his family. He also repudiated his faith in Judaism by claiming that reason prevented him from believing in God. After studying for a degree in history at New College, Oxford, he graduated in 1914. He was awarded the Beit memorial prize during his time at New College.

In April 1913, in the cause of women's suffrage, he and a friend planted an explosive device in the men's lavatory at Oxted railway station, Surrey; it exploded but caused only slight damage. Laski failed his medical eligibility tests and so missed fighting in World War I. After graduation, he worked briefly at the Daily Herald under George Lansbury. His daughter Diana was born in 1916.

== Career ==
=== Academic career ===
In 1914, following his graduation from Oxford University, Laski was appointed as a lecturer of modern history at McGill University in Montreal. In 1916, he moved to Harvard University. He also lectured at Yale in 1919 to 1920. For his outspoken support of the Boston Police Strike of 1919, Laski received severe criticism. He was briefly involved with the founding of The New School for Social Research in 1919, where he also lectured.

Laski cultivated a large network of American friends centred at Harvard, whose law review he had edited. He was often invited to lecture in America and wrote for The New Republic. He became friends with Felix Frankfurter, Herbert Croly, Walter Lippmann, Edmund Wilson, and Charles A. Beard. His long friendship with Supreme Court Justice Oliver Wendell Holmes Jr. was cemented by weekly letters, which were later published. He knew many powerful figures and claimed to know many more. Critics have often commented on Laski's repeated exaggerations and self-promotion, which Holmes tolerated. His wife commented that he was "half-man, half-child, all his life".

Laski returned to England in 1920 and began teaching government at the London School of Economics (LSE). In 1926, he was made professor of political science at the LSE. Laski was an executive member of the socialist Fabian Society from 1922 to 1936. In 1936, he co-founded the Left Book Club along with Victor Gollancz and John Strachey. He was a prolific writer and produced a number of books and essays throughout the 1920s and the 1930s.

At the LSE in the 1930s, Laski developed a connection with scholars from the Institute for Social Research, now more commonly known as the Frankfurt School. In 1933, with almost all the Institute's members in exile, Laski was among a number of British socialists, including Sidney Webb and R. H. Tawney, who arranged for the establishment of a London office for the Institute's use. After the Institute moved to Columbia University in 1934, Laski was one of its sponsored guest lecturers invited to New York. Laski also played a role in bringing Franz Neumann to join the Institute. After fleeing Germany almost immediately after Adolf Hitler's rise to power, Neumann did graduate work in political science under Laski and Karl Mannheim at the LSE and wrote his dissertation on the rise and fall of the rule of law. It was on Laski's recommendation that Neumann was then invited to join the Institute in 1936.

=== Teacher ===
Laski was regarded as a gifted lecturer but he would alienate his audience by humiliating those who asked questions. Despite this, he was liked by his students, and was especially influential among the Asian and African students who attended the LSE. Describing Laski's approach, Kingsley Martin wrote in 1968:

He was still in his late twenties and looked like a schoolboy. His lectures on the history of political ideas were brilliant, eloquent, and delivered without a note; he often referred to current controversies, even when the subject was Hobbes's theory of sovereignty.

Ralph Miliband, another of Laski's students, praised his teaching:

His lectures taught more, much more than political science. They taught a faith that ideas mattered, that knowledge was important and its pursuit exciting.... His seminars taught tolerance, the willingness to listen although one disagreed, the values of ideas being confronted. And it was all immense fun, an exciting game that had meaning, and it was also a sieve of ideas, a gymnastics of the mind carried on with vigour and directed unobtrusively with superb craftsmanship. I think I know now why he gave himself so freely. Partly it was because he was human and warm and that he was so interested in people. But mainly it was because he loved students, and he loved students because they were young. Because he had a glowing faith that youth was generous and alive, eager and enthusiastic and fresh. That by helping young people he was helping the future and bringing nearer that brave world in which he so passionately believed.

Laski also had a large influence on Indian independence activist and later India's first Defence Minister V. K. Krishna Menon, both politically and personally. Indeed Laski is famously quoted as stating "Krishna Menon is the best student I ever had."

=== Ideology and political convictions ===
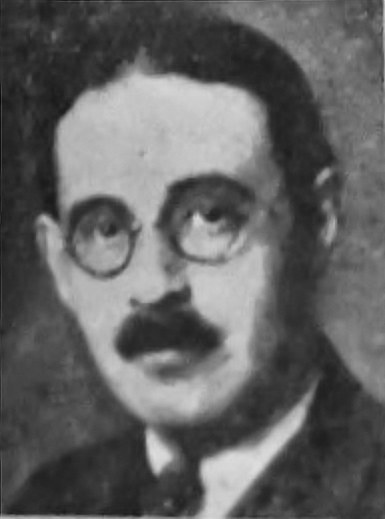
Laski c. 1930s

Laski's early work promoted pluralism, especially in the essays collected in Studies in the Problem of Sovereignty (1917), Authority in the Modern State (1919), and The Foundations of Sovereignty (1921). He argued that the state should not be considered supreme since people could and should have loyalties to local organisations, clubs, labour unions, and societies. The state should respect those allegiances and promote pluralism and decentralisation.

Laski became a proponent of Marxism and believed in a planned economy based on the public ownership of the means of production. Instead of, as he saw it, a coercive state, Laski believed in the evolution of co-operative states that were internationally bound and stressed social welfare. He also believed that since the capitalist class would not acquiesce in its own liquidation, the co-operative commonwealth was not likely to be attained without violence. He also had a commitment to civil liberties, free speech and association, and representative democracy. Initially, he believed that the League of Nations would bring about an "international democratic system". From the late 1920s, his political beliefs became radicalised, and he believed that it was necessary to go beyond capitalism to "transcend the existing system of sovereign states". Laski was dismayed by the Molotov–Ribbentrop Pact of August 1939 and wrote a preface to the Left Book Club collection criticising it, titled Betrayal of the Left.

Between the beginning of World War II in 1939 and the attack on Pearl Harbor in 1941, which drew the United States into the war, Laski was a prominent voice advocating American support for the Allies, became a prolific author of articles in the American press, frequently undertook lecture tours in the United States and influenced prominent American friends including Felix Frankfurter, Edward R. Murrow, Max Lerner, and Eric Sevareid. In his last years, he was disillusioned by the Cold War and the 1948 Czechoslovak coup d'état. George Orwell described him as a "socialist by allegiance, and a liberal by temperament". Laski tried to mobilise Britain's academics, teachers, and intellectuals behind the socialist cause, the Socialist League being one effort. He had some success but that element typically found itself marginalised in the Labour Party.

=== Zionism and anti-Catholicism ===
Laski was always a Zionist at heart and always felt himself a part of the Jewish nation but viewed traditional Jewish religion as restrictive. In 1946, Laski claimed in a address that the Catholic Church opposed democracy, and said that "it is impossible to make peace with the Roman Catholic Church. It is one of the permanent enemies of all that is decent in the human spirit." In his final years, he became critical of what he saw as extremism in Israel at the outbreak of the 1947–1948 civil war in Mandatory Palestine, arguing that they had not prevailed "upon an indefensible group among them to desist from using indefensible means for an end to which they were never proportionate."

=== Political career ===
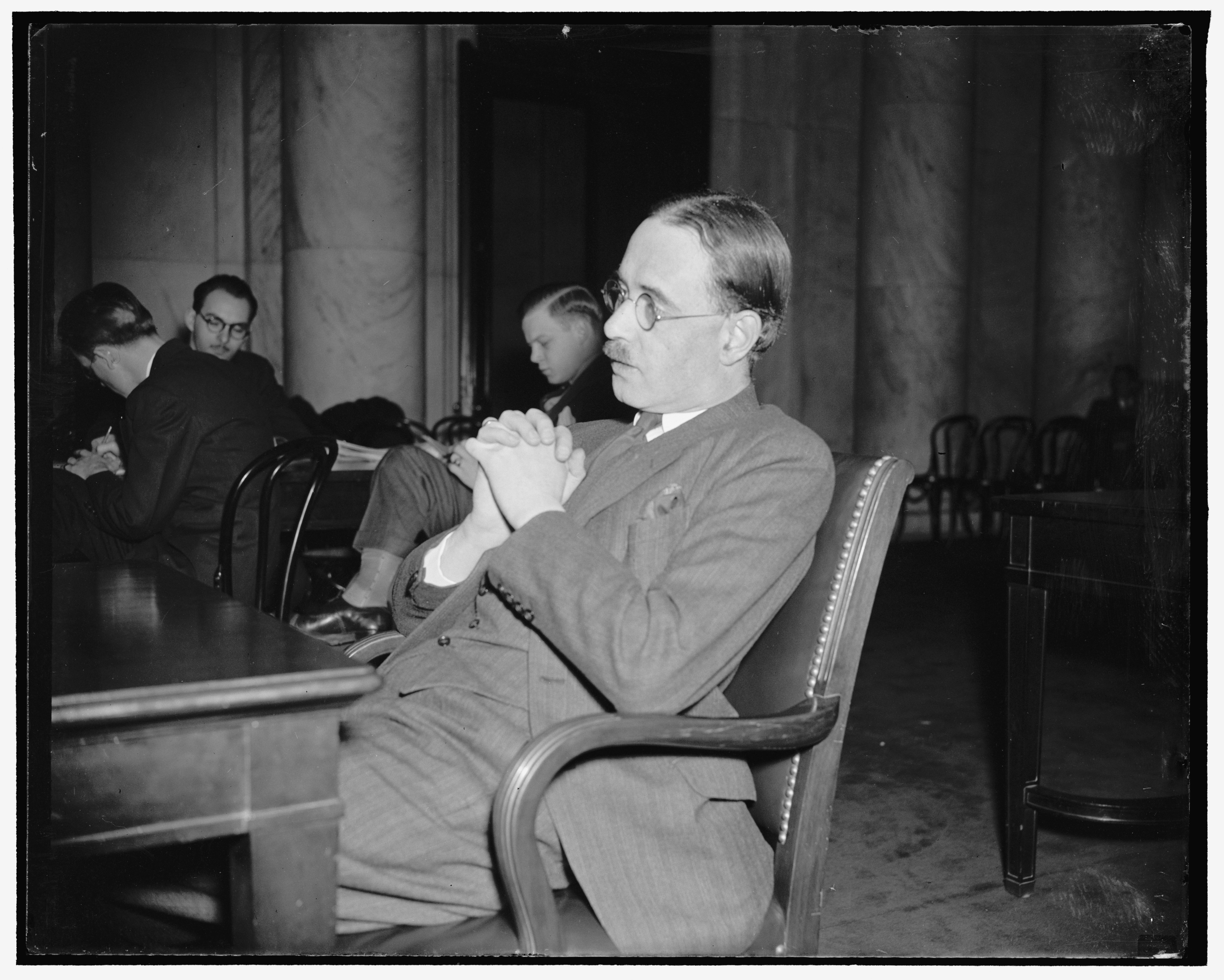
Laski speaks before the United States Senate Committee on the Judiciary, 1938

Laski's main political role came as a writer and lecturer on every topic of concern to the left at that time, including socialism, capitalism, working conditions, eugenics, women's suffrage, imperialism, decolonisation, disarmament, human rights, worker education, and Zionism. He was tireless in his speeches and pamphleteering and was always on call to help a Labour candidate. In between, he served on scores of committees and carried a full load as a professor and advisor to students.

Laski plunged into Labour Party politics on his return to London in 1920. In 1923, he turned down the offer of a Parliament seat and cabinet position by Ramsay MacDonald and also a seat in the Lords. He felt betrayed by MacDonald in the crisis of 1931 and decided that a peaceful, democratic transition to socialism would be blocked by the violence of the opposition. In 1932, Laski joined the Socialist League, a left-wing faction of the Labour Party.

In 1937, he was involved in the failed attempt by the Socialist League in co-operation with the Independent Labour Party (ILP) and the Communist Party of Great Britain (CPGB) to form a Popular Front to bring down the Conservative government of Neville Chamberlain. In 1934 to 1945, he served as an alderman in the Fulham Borough Council and also the chairman of the libraries committee. Also in 1937, the Socialist League was rejected by the Labour Party and folded. He was elected as a member of the Labour Party's National Executive Committee and he remained a member until 1949. In 1944, he chaired the Labour Party Conference and served as the party's chair in 1945 to 1946.

=== Declining role ===
During World War II, he supported Prime Minister Winston Churchill's coalition government and gave countless speeches to encourage the battle against Nazi Germany. He suffered a nervous breakdown brought about by overwork. During the war, he repeatedly feuded with other Labour figures and with Churchill on matters great and small. He steadily lost his influence. In 1942, he drafted the Labour Party pamphlet The Old World and the New Society calling for the transformation of Britain into a socialist state by allowing its government to retain wartime economic planning and price controls into the postwar era.

In the 1945 UK general election campaign, Churchill warned that Laski, as the Labour Party chairman, would be the power behind the throne in an Attlee government. While speaking for the Labour candidate in Newark, Nottinghamshire, on 16 June 1945, Laski said, "If Labour did not obtain what it needed by general consent, we shall have to use violence even if it means revolution." The next day, accounts of Laski's speech appeared, and the Conservatives attacked the Labour Party for its chairman's advocacy of violence. Laski filed a libel suit against the Daily Express newspaper, which backed the Conservatives. The defence showed that over the years Laski had often bandied about loose threats of "revolution". The jury found for the newspaper within forty minutes of deliberations.

Attlee gave Laski no role in the new Labour government. Even before the libel trial, Laski's relationship with Attlee had been strained. Laski had once called Attlee "uninteresting and uninspired" in the American press and even tried to remove him by asking for Attlee's resignation in an open letter. He tried to delay the Potsdam Conference until after Attlee's position was clarified. He tried to bypass Attlee by directly dealing with Churchill. Laski tried to pre-empt foreign policy decisions by laying down guidelines for the new Labour government. Attlee rebuked him:

You have no right whatever to speak on behalf of the Government. Foreign affairs are in the capable hands of Ernest Bevin. His task is quite sufficiently difficult without the irresponsible statements of the kind you are making ... I can assure you there is widespread resentment in the Party at your activities and a period of silence on your part would be welcome.

Although he continued to work for the Labour Party until he died, Laski never regained political influence. His pessimism deepened as he disagreed with the anti-Soviet policies of the Attlee government in the emerging Cold War, and he was profoundly disillusioned with the anti-Soviet direction of American foreign policy.

== Death and legacy ==
Laski contracted influenza and died in London on 24 March 1950, aged 56.

Laski's biographer Michael Newman wrote:

Convinced that the problems of his time were too urgent for leisurely academic reflection, Laski wrote too much, overestimated his influence, and sometimes failed to distinguish between analysis and polemic. But he was a serious thinker and a charismatic personality whose views have been distorted because he refused to accept Cold War orthodoxies.

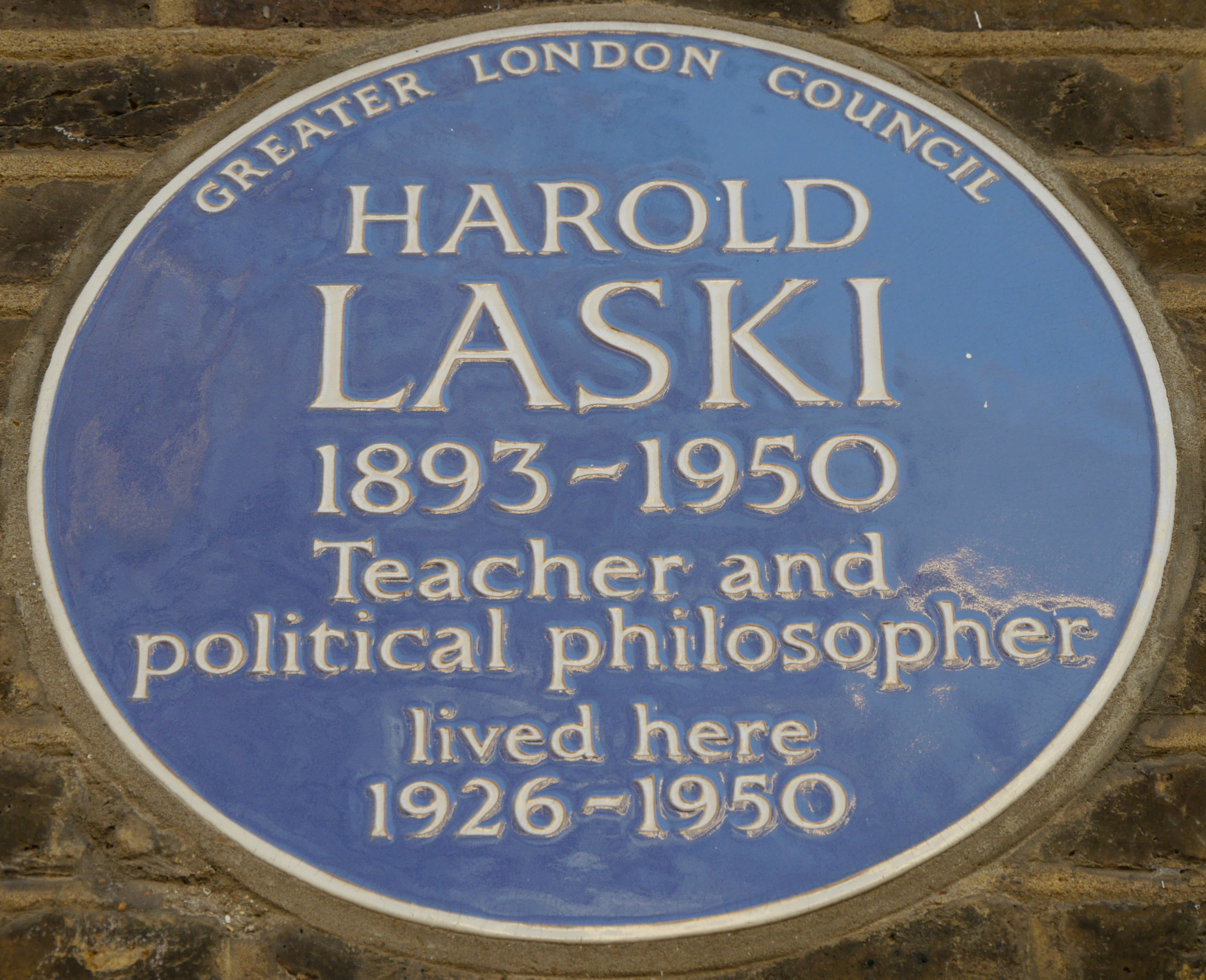
Blue plaque, 5 Addison Bridge Place, West Kensington, London

Columbia University professor Herbert A. Deane identified five distinct phases of Laski's thought that he never integrated. The first three were pluralist (1914–1924), Fabian (1925–1931), and Marxian (1932–1939). There followed a popular front approach (1940–1945), and in the last years (1946–1950) near-incoherence and multiple contradictions. Laski's long-term impact on Britain is hard to quantify. Newman observes: "It has been widely held that his early books were the most profound and that he subsequently wrote far too much, with polemics displacing serious analysis." In an essay published a few years after Laski's death, Professor Alfred Cobban of University College London commented:

Among recent political thinkers, it seems to me that one of the very few, perhaps the only one, who followed the traditional pattern, accepted the problems presented by his age, and devoted himself to the attempt to find an answer to them was Harold Laski. Though I am bound to say that I do not agree with his analysis or his conclusions, I think that he was trying to do the right kind of thing. And this, I suspect, is the reason why, practically alone among political thinkers in Great Britain, he exercised a positive influence over both political thought and action.

Laski had a major long-term impact on support for socialism in India and other countries in Asia and Africa. He taught generations of future leaders at the LSE, including India's Jawaharlal Nehru. According to John Kenneth Galbraith, "the centre of Nehru's thinking was Laski" and "India the country most influenced by Laski's ideas". It is mainly due to his influence that the LSE has a semi-mythological status in India. He was steady in his unremitting advocacy of the independence of India. He was a revered figure to Indian students at the LSE. According to his biographers Isaac Kramnick and Barry Sheerman, "it was often said that there was a vacant chair at every Cabinet meeting in India, reserved for the ghost of Professor Harold Laski". His recommendation of K. R. Narayanan (later president of India) to Nehru (then Prime Minister of India), resulted in Nehru appointing Narayanan to the Indian Foreign Service. In his memory, the Indian government established The Harold Laski Institute of Political Science in 1954 at Ahmedabad.

Speaking at a meeting organised in Laski's memory by the Indian League at London on 3 May 1950, Nehru praised him as follows:

It is difficult to realise that Professor Harold Laski is no more. Lovers of freedom all over the world pay tribute to the magnificent work that he did. We in India are particularly grateful for his staunch advocacy of India's freedom, and the great part he played in bringing it about. At no time did he falter or compromise on the principles he held dear, and a large number of persons drew splendid inspiration from him. Those who knew him personally counted that association as a rare privilege, and his passing away has come as a great sorrow and a shock.

Laski educated the outspoken Chinese intellectual and journalist Chu Anping at LSE. Anping was later prosecuted by the Chinese Communist regime of the 1960s. Juan Perón, Argentine lieutenant general as well as left-wing populist and nationalist who served as the 35th and 45th president of Argentina, was also inspired by Laski and based many of his economic policies on Laski's postulates, including his welfare state project. Perón stated that Laski provided “theoretical support” to his policies, and that his Labour Party was based on Laski's party model. Perón consistently cited Laski as one of his main political inspirations, along with Franklin D. Roosevelt and Christian socialism. Perón's ideological legacy is highly contested - denounced as a form of fascism by some, Peronism is variously defined as "Christian socialism, national socialism, demagogic dictatorship, plebiscitary presidential system, state socialism, non-Marxist collectivism, worker democracy or national capitalism". Contemporary scholars of Peronism such as Federico Finchelstein see it as "the synthesis of nationalism and non-Marxist Christian socialism". Judith Adler Hellman wrote on Perón and Peronism: "Rather than Mussolini's Italy, Perón's most frequently quoted model was none other than Britain's new Labour Government, which was no more comfortable with Harold Laski than was the Peronist Movement with its left wing."

Laski was an inspiration for Ellsworth Toohey, the antagonist in Ayn Rand's novel The Fountainhead (1943). The posthumously published Journals of Ayn Rand, edited by David Harriman, include a detailed description of Rand attending a New York lecture by Laski, as part of gathering material for her novel, following which she changed the physical appearance of the fictional Toohey to fit that of the actual Laski. George Orwell, in his 1946 essay "Politics and the English Language" cited, as his first example of poor writing, a 53-word sentence with five negatives from Laski's "Essay in Freedom of Expression": "I am not, indeed, sure whether it is not true to say that the Milton who once seemed not unlike a seventeenth-century Shelley had not become, out of an experience ever more bitter in each year, more alien (sic) to the founder of that Jesuit sect which nothing could induce him to tolerate." Orwell parodied it with "A not unblack dog was chasing a not unsmall rabbit across a not ungreen field." 67 of the Labour MPs elected in 1945 had been taught by Laski as university students, at Workers' Educational Association classes or on courses for wartime officers. When Laski died, the Labour MP Ian Mikardo commented: "His mission in life was to translate the religion of the universal brotherhood of man into the language of political economy."

Laski was quoted by General António Ramalho Eanes, the leader of the 25 November 1975 anti-communist counter-coup in Portugal that brought Socialist Party to power and ended the radical phase of the Carnation Revolution, in his inaugural speech as president on 14 July 1976.

== Partial bibliography ==
- Basis of Vicarious Liability 1916 26 Yale Law Journal 105
- Studies in the Problem of Sovereignty 1917
- Authority in the Modern State 1919, ISBN 1-58477-275-1
- Political Thought in England from Locke to Bentham 1920
- The Foundations of Sovereignty, and other essays. New York: Harcourt, Brace, and Company. 1921 – via Internet Archive.
- Karl Marx 1921
- The state in the new social order 1922
- Letters of Edmund Burke: A Selection, 1922
- The position of parties and the right of dissolution 1924
- A Grammar of Politics, 1925
- Britain), Fabian Society (Great; Laski, Harold J. 1893-1950. (Harold Joseph) (1925). Socialism and freedom. Westminster: The Fabian Society – via HathiTrust.
- The problem of a second chamber 1925
- Communism, 1927
- The British Cabinet : a study of its personnel, 1801-1924 1928
- Liberty in the Modern State, 1930
- "The Dangers of Obedience and Other Essays" 1930
- The limitations of the expert 1931
- Democracy in Crisis 1933
- The State in Theory and Practice, 1935, The Viking Press
- The Rise of European Liberalism: An Essay in Interpretation, 1936
  - US title: The Rise of Liberalism: The Philosophy of a Business Civilization, 1936
- The American Presidency, 1940
- Where Do We Go From Here? A Proclamation of British Democracy 1940
- Reflections on the Revolution of our Time , 1943
- Faith, Reason, and Civilisation, 1944
- The American Democracy, 1948, The Viking Press
- Communist Manifesto: Socialist Landmark: A New Appreciation Written for the Labour Party (1948)

== See also ==
- American studies in the United Kingdom

Party political offices
Preceded by Ellen Wilkinson	Chair of the Labour Party; 1944–1945	Succeeded by Philip Noel-Baker
Preceded by G. D. H. Cole	Chairman of the Fabian Society; 1946–1948	Succeeded by G. D. H. Cole
