= List of Grade B+ listed buildings in County Tyrone =

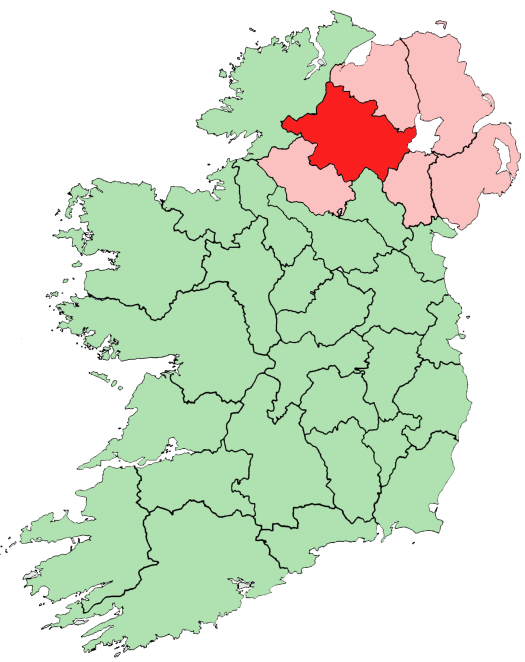
County Tyrone within Ireland

This is a list of Grade B+ listed buildings in County Tyrone, Northern Ireland.

In Northern Ireland, the term listed building refers to a building or other structure officially designated as being of "special architectural or historic interest". Grade B+ structures are those considered to be "buildings which might have merited grade A status but for detracting features such as an incomplete design, lower quality additions or alterations. Also included are buildings that because of exceptional features, interiors or environmental qualities are clearly above the general standard set by grade B buildings. A building may merit listing as grade B+ where its historic importance is greater than a similar building listed as grade B."

Listing began later in Northern Ireland than in the rest of the UK; the first provision for listing was contained in the Planning (Northern Ireland) Order 1972, and the current legislative basis for listing is the Planning (Northern Ireland) Act 2011. Under Section 80 of the Act, the Department for Communities is required to compile lists of buildings of "special architectural or historic interest". The responsibility for the listing process rests with the Historic Environment Division (HED), a division within the Department.

An initial survey of Northern Ireland's building stock was begun in 1969, in anticipation of the legislation. By the time of the completion of this First Survey in 1994, the listing process had developed considerably, and it was therefore decided to embark upon a Second Survey to update and cross-check the original information. As of April 2016, the Second Survey had completed around 60% of the region. Information gathered during this survey, relating to both listed and unlisted buildings, is entered into the publicly accessible Northern Ireland Buildings Database. A range of listing criteria, which aim to define architectural and historic interest, have been developed and are published as Annex C of Planning Policy Statement 6 (March 2011), and are used to determine whether or not to list a building.

Once listed, Listed building consent must be obtained from local authority prior to any alteration to such a structure. The authority must pay 'due regard' to the architectural and historic interest of the building when considering proposals for change There are approximately 8,500 listed buildings in Northern Ireland, representing 2% of the total building stock. Of these, around 580 are listed at Grade B+.

County Tyrone covers 3,155 square kilometres (1,218 sq mi), and has a population of around 166,500. The County has 110 Grade B+ listed buildings.

== Listed buildings ==
| Building address | Grid Ref. (Note: Sometimes known as OSGB36, the grid reference is based on the British national grid reference system used by the Ordnance Survey.) Geo-coordinates | Type (Note: The type of structure, as identified by the DfC.) | Local authority | Second Survey | Original Survey | HB Number (Note: The "HB Number" is a unique number assigned to each listed building by the DfC.) | Image |
|---|---|---|---|---|---|---|---|
| Kildress Rectory 6 Rectory Road Kildress Cookstown BT80 9RX | | Rectories/ Manses etc | Cookstown | B+ | B | HB09/01/001 | Upload Photo |
| St Mary's Roman Catholic Church, 7 Cavanakeeran Road, Pomeroy, Dungannon | | Church | Cookstown | B+ | B | HB09/02/003 | Upload another image |
| Bridge, Wellbrook Road, Cookstown | | Bridge | Cookstown | B+ | B | HB09/04/004 | Upload Photo |
| Wellbrook Beetling Mill, 20 Wellbrook Road, Cookstown BT80 9RY | | Gallery/ Museum | Cookstown | B+ | B+ | HB09/04/003 | Upload another image See more images |
| Desertcreat Parish Church, 6 Desertcreat Road, Tullyhogue, Cookstown BT80 9UH | | Church | Cookstown | B+ | B | HB09/05/009 | Upload Photo |
| Rockdale House, 39 Rockdale Road, Cookstown BT80 9BA | | Country House | Cookstown | B+ | B1 | HB09/05/015 | Upload Photo |
| Tullylagan House, 40 Tullylagan Road, Cookstown BT80 8UP | | Country House | Cookstown | B+ | B1 | HB09/05/019 | Upload Photo |
| St Andrew's Church of Ireland, Ardtrea Road, Stewartstown, Dungannon BT71 5LY | | Church | Cookstown | B+ | B | HB09/08/017 B | Upload Photo |
| St Patrick's Church of Ireland, 125 Coagh Road, Stewartstown, Dungannon BT71 5LL | | Church | Cookstown | B+ | B+ | HB09/08/014 | Upload Photo |
| Holy Trinity Roman Catholic Church, Chapel Street, Cookstown BT80 8QB | | Church | Cookstown | B+ | B+ | HB09/14/003 | Upload another image See more images |
| Kingsmill Farm, 62 Ballynargan Road, Stewartstown BT71 5NF | | House | Cookstown | B+ | B1 | HB09/08/021 | Upload Photo |
| Coyle's Cottage, Annaghmore Road, Coagh BT80 0JA | | Gallery/ Museum | Cookstown | B+ | B1 | HB09/10/003 | Upload another image |
| 48 Molesworth Street, Cookstown BT80 8PA | | Health Centre | Cookstown | B+ | B1 | HB09/13/016 | Upload Photo |
| Former LMS Railway Terminus, Molesworth Street Cookstown BT80 8PA | | Shop | Cookstown | B+ | B1 | HB09/13/019 | Upload Photo |
| 48/50 William Street, Cookstown BT80 8NB | | Shop - Terrace | Cookstown | B+ | B1 | HB09/13/022 | Upload Photo |
| St Luran's Church of Ireland Church, 96 Church Street Cookstown BT80 8HX | | Church | Cookstown | B+ | B+ | HB09/15/001 | Upload Photo |
| Cottage and Outbuildings at 74 Alderwood Rd FivemiletownBT75 0JG | | Farm Buildings | Dungannon & South Tyrone | B+ | | HB13/01/055 | Upload Photo |
| St. John's Church, Fivemiletown | | Church | Dungannon & South Tyrone | | B+ | HB13/01/001 | Upload another image |
| Blessingbourne, Fivemiletown | | House | Dungannon & South Tyrone | | B+ | HB13/01/003 | Upload Photo |
| Original Dwelling at Blessingbourne, Fivemiletown BT75 0QS | | HOUSE | Dungannon & South Tyrone | | B+ | HB13/01/003 B | Upload Photo |
| Blessingbourne Lodge, Fivemiletown | | Gates/ Screens/ Lodges | Dungannon & South Tyrone | | B+ | HB13/01/006 | Upload Photo |
| ST. MACARTAN'S HOME 74 MAIN ST. CLOGHER | | HOUSE | Dungannon & South Tyrone | | B+ | HB13/02/002 A | Upload Photo |
| GATE LODGE 72 MAIN ST. CLOGHER | | Gates/ Screens/ Lodges | Dungannon & South Tyrone | | B+ | HB13/02/002 B | Upload Photo |
| Garden Cottage at Favor Royal House Favour Royal Road Augher Dungannon BT77 OEW | | Estate Related Structures | Dungannon & South Tyrone | B+ | B | HB13/03/008 | Upload Photo |
| Favor Royal Favour Royal Road Augher Dungannon BT77 OEW | | Country House | Dungannon & South Tyrone | B+ | B+ | HB13/03/004 | Upload Photo |
| ST. MC CARTAN'S RC CHURCH AUGHER | | CHURCH | Dungannon & South Tyrone | | B+ | HB13/03/054 | Upload another image |
| ST. MICHAEL'S CHURCH CLONOE PARISH, KILLARY GLEBE COALISLAND | | CHURCH | Dungannon & South Tyrone | | B+ | HB13/05/002 | Upload another image |
| DERRYWINNIN HOUSE COALISLAND ROAD DUNGANNON | | HOUSE | Dungannon & South Tyrone | | B+ | HB13/06/001 | Upload Photo |
| 142 Moy Road Culceeran Dungannon BT71 7DX | | House | Dungannon & South Tyrone | B+ | B1 | HB13/08/077 | Upload Photo |
| 14 GRANGE ROAD GRANGE DUNGANNON | | House | Dungannon & South Tyrone | | B+ | HB13/08/065 | Upload Photo |
| GRANGE PARK 35 GRANGE ROAD GRANGE DUNGANNON | | House | Dungannon & South Tyrone | | B+ | HB13/08/067 | Upload Photo |
| ST. PAUL'S CHURCH (KILLEESHILL PARISH) (C of I) 79 FASGLASHAGH ROAD DUNGANNON | | Church | Dungannon & South Tyrone | | B+ | HB13/09/004 | Upload Photo |
| 1 BANK TERRACE MAIN ST. CALEDON | | House - Terrace | Dungannon & South Tyrone | | B+ | HB13/10/001 A | Upload Photo |
| 2 BANK TERRACE MAIN ST. CALEDON | | House - Terrace | Dungannon & South Tyrone | | B+ | HB13/10/001 B | Upload Photo |
| 3 BANK TERRACE MAIN ST. CALEDON | | House - Terrace | Dungannon & South Tyrone | | B+ | HB13/10/001 C | Upload Photo |
| 4 BANK TERRACE MAIN STREET CALEDON | | House - Terrace | Dungannon & South Tyrone | | B+ | HB13/10/001 D | Upload Photo |
| 5 BANK TERRACE MAIN ST. CALEDON | | House - Terrace | Dungannon & South Tyrone | | B+ | HB13/10/001 E | Upload Photo |
| 6 BANK TERRACE MAIN ST. CALEDON | | House - Terrace | Dungannon & South Tyrone | | B+ | HB13/10/001 F | Upload Photo |
| 1 ESTATE TERRACE MAIN ST. CALEDON | | House - Terrace | Dungannon & South Tyrone | | B+ | HB13/10/002 A | Upload Photo |
| 2 ESTATE TERRACE MAIN ST. CALEDON | | House - Terrace | Dungannon & South Tyrone | | B+ | HB13/10/002 B | Upload Photo |
| 3 ESTATE TERRACE MAIN ST. CALEDON | | House - Terrace | Dungannon & South Tyrone | | B+ | HB13/10/002 C | Upload Photo |
| 4 ESTATE TERRACE MAIN ST. CALEDON | | House - Terrace | Dungannon & South Tyrone | | B+ | HB13/10/002 D | Upload Photo |
| MAIN GATE LODGE CALEDON HOUSE CALEDON | | Gates/ Screens/ Lodges | Dungannon & South Tyrone | | B+ | HB13/10/005 | Upload Photo |
| COACH YARD BUILDING CALEDON HOUSE CALEDON | | OUTBUILDINGS | Dungannon & South Tyrone | | B+ | HB13/10/006 | Upload Photo |
| GATEWAY TO FORECOURT CALEDON HOUSE CALEDON | | Gates/ Screens/ Lodges | Dungannon & South Tyrone | | B+ | HB13/10/014 | Upload Photo |
| METHODIST CHURCH(ELIM CHURCH) CHURCH HILL CALEDON | | Church | Dungannon & South Tyrone | | B+ | HB13/10/046 | Upload Photo |
| DYAN CORN MILL, CALEDON | | Mill | Dungannon & South Tyrone | | B+ | HB13/10/075 | Upload Photo |
| DREDGE BRIDGE OVER THE BLACKWATER GLENARB CALEDON | | Bridge | Dungannon & South Tyrone | | B+ | HB13/10/077 | Upload Photo |
| THE ARCHDEACONRY CARNTEEL ROAD GLACK AUGHNACLOY | | House | Dungannon & South Tyrone | | B+ | HB13/12/035 | Upload Photo |
| ST. JOSEPH'S CONVENT GRAMMAR SCHOOL MULLYGRUEN DONAGHMORE | | School | Dungannon & South Tyrone | | B+ | HB13/15/001 | Upload Photo |
| DISUSED AQUEDUCT DRUMREAGH OTRA/FARLOUGH Dungannon | | Canal Structure | Dungannon & South Tyrone | | B+ | HB13/15/002 | Upload Photo |
| ANNAGINNY LODGE 38 ANNAGINNY ROAD DONAGHMORE | | House | Dungannon & South Tyrone | | B+ | HB13/15/003 | Upload Photo |
| ST. ANNE'S PARISH CHURCH CHURCH ST., Dungannon | | Church | Dungannon & South Tyrone | | B+ | HB13/19/001 | Upload Photo |
| 18 Northland Row, Dungannon | | House - Terrace | Dungannon & South Tyrone | | B+ | HB13/20/003 D | Upload Photo |
| 24 Northland Row, Dungannon | | House - Terrace | Dungannon & South Tyrone | | B+ | HB13/20/003 G | Upload Photo |
| 32 Northland Row, Dungannon | | House - Terrace | Dungannon & South Tyrone | | B+ | HB13/20/004 C | Upload Photo |
| 40 Northland Row, Dungannon | | House - Terrace | Dungannon & South Tyrone | | B+ | HB13/20/004 G | Upload Photo |
| 42 Northland Row, Dungannon | | House - Terrace | Dungannon & South Tyrone | | B+ | HB13/20/004 H | Upload Photo |
| 44 Northland Row, Dungannon | | House - Terrace | Dungannon & South Tyrone | | B+ | HB13/20/004 I | Upload Photo |
| General Nicholson Statue, Dungannon Royal School, Dungannon | | Memorial | Dungannon & South Tyrone | | B+ | HB13/20/005 | Upload another image See more images |
| Dungannon Royal School, Dungannon | | School | Dungannon & South Tyrone | | B+ | HB13/20/001 | Upload another image See more images |
| 12 Northland Row, Dungannon | | House - Terrace | Dungannon & South Tyrone | | B+ | HB13/20/003 A | Upload Photo |
| 14 Northland Row, Dungannon | | House - Terrace | Dungannon & South Tyrone | | B+ | HB13/20/003 B | Upload Photo |
| 16 Northland Row, Dungannon | | House - Terrace | Dungannon & South Tyrone | | B+ | HB13/20/003 C | Upload Photo |
| 20 Northland Row, Dungannon | | House - Terrace | Dungannon & South Tyrone | | B+ | HB13/20/003 E | Upload Photo |
| 22 Northland Row, Dungannon | | House - Terrace | Dungannon & South Tyrone | | B+ | HB13/20/003 F | Upload Photo |
| 26 Northland Row, Dungannon | | House - Terrace | Dungannon & South Tyrone | | B+ | HB13/20/003 H | Upload Photo |
| 28 Northland Row, Dungannon | | House - Terrace | Dungannon & South Tyrone | | B+ | HB13/20/004 A | Upload Photo |
| 34 Northland Row, Dungannon | | House - Terrace | Dungannon & South Tyrone | | B+ | HB13/20/004 D | Upload Photo |
| 38 Northland Row, Dungannon | | House - Terrace | Dungannon & South Tyrone | | B+ | HB13/20/004 F | Upload Photo |
| ST. PATRICK'S R C CHURCH, KILLYMAN ROAD, Dungannon | | CHURCH | Dungannon & South Tyrone | | B+ | HB13/20/006 | Upload Photo |
| FORMER BANK OF IRELAND aka RANFURLY HOUSE 26 MARKET SQUARE, Dungannon | | Bank | Dungannon & South Tyrone | | B+ | HB13/20/009 | Upload Photo |
| The Old Rectory, Lower Langfield, Sloughan Road, Drumquin, BT78 4PF | | House | Omagh | B+ | B1 | HB11/04/001 | Upload Photo |
| Clanabogan Church Dromore Road Clanabogan, Lower Omagh BT78 1SN | | Church | Omagh | B+ | B+ | HB11/05/002 | Upload another image |
| Clogherny Parish Church (C of I) (St.Patrick's) Church Road Beragh Sixmilecross Omagh BT79 0SA | | Church | Omagh | B+ | B+ | HB11/07/002 | Upload Photo |
| Camowen Green, Camowen Road, Omagh, BT79 0HA | | House | Omagh | B+ | | HB11/07/040 | Upload Photo |
| Courthouse High Street Omagh BT78 1DU | | Court House | Omagh | B+ | A | HB11/13/001 | Upload another image See more images |
| First Presbyterian Church Dublin Road Omagh BT78 1TT | | Church | Omagh | B+ | B | HB11/13/011 | Upload another image See more images |
| St. Columba’s Church of Ireland Church Street Omagh BT78 1DG | | Church | Omagh | B+ | B+ | HB11/13/002 | Upload another image See more images |
| Tyrone County Club 10 High Street Omagh BT78 1BQ | | Recreational Club - Terrace | Omagh | B+ | B1 | HB11/13/013 | Upload Photo |
| Fermanagh and Tyrone Hospital 1 Donaghanie Road Omagh BT79 0NS | | School | Omagh | B+ | B1 | HB11/15/004 A | Upload Photo |
| Old Mountjoy 205 Gortin Road Mountjoy Forest East Division Gortin BT79 7JQ | | Country House | Omagh | B+ | B+ | HB11/16/002 | Upload Photo |
| Beltrim Castle 86 Killymore Road Gortin BT79 8PL | | House | Omagh | B+ | B1 | HB11/16/013 B | Upload Photo |
| Cappagh Church of Ireland Cappagh Road Omagh BT79 7JG | | Church | Omagh | B+ | | HB11/16/042 | Upload another image |
| Termon House 64 Termon Road Carrickmore Omagh BT79 9JB | | House | Omagh | B+ | B1 | HB11/19/003 | Upload Photo |
| Killeter Bridge, Carn Road, Killeter Castlederg, BT81 7EH | | Bridge | Strabane | B+ | B1 | HB10/01/018 | Upload Photo |
| Mourne Bridge, Carn Road, Castlederg, BT81 7UU | | Bridge | Strabane | B+ | B1 | HB10/01/020 | Upload Photo |
| Derg Parish Church, 13 Main Street, Castlederg, BT81 7AY | | Church | Strabane | B+ | B+ | HB10/02/001 | Upload Photo |
| Baronscourt Parish Church, Cloonty Road Newtownstewart, BT78 4TG | | Church | Strabane | B+ | B | HB10/03/001 | Upload Photo |
| 35 Knockbrack Road Spamount Castlederg BT81 7LU | | House | Strabane | B+ | | HB10/03/013 | Upload Photo |
| Woodbrook, 61 Deerpark Road, Birnaghs, Newtownstewart, BT78 4LB | | House | Strabane | B+ | B | HB10/04/013 | Upload Photo |
| The Agent's House, Baronscourt, Newtownstewart, BT78 4EZ | | House | Strabane | B+ | B+ | HB10/04/001 C | Upload Photo |
| Newtownstewart Old Bridge Douglas Road Newtownstewart BT78 4NE | | Bridge | Strabane | B+ | B+ | HB10/04/007 | Upload another image |
| The Stableyard, Baronscourt, Newtownstewart, BT78 4EZ | | Estate Related Structures | Strabane | B+ | B1 | HB10/04/001 B | Upload Photo |
| Rock Cottage, 20 Drumlegagh Road North, Baronscourt, Newtownstewart, BT78 4HD | | House | Strabane | B+ | B1 | HB10/04/001 H | Upload Photo |
| St Eugene's RC Church, Plumbridge Road, Newtownstewart, BT78 4NR | | Church | Strabane | B+ | B+ | HB10/05/003 | Upload Photo |
| Wilson House, 28 Spout Road, Dergalt, Strabane BT82 8NB | | Gallery/ Museum | Strabane | B+ | B+ | HB10/06/011 | Upload another image |
| Herdmans' Mill, Mill Avenue, Sion Mills Liggartown, Strabane BT82 9HE | | Mill | Strabane | B+ | B | HB10/07/004 | Upload another image |
| St Theresa's RC Church, 145 Melmount Road, Sion Mills, Strabane BT82 9EX | | Church | Strabane | B+ | B | HB10/07/021 | Upload another image See more images |
| Church of the Good Shepherd, Melmount Road, Sion Mills BT82 9ET | | Church | Strabane | B+ | B+ | HB10/07/002 A | Upload another image |
| Gate Lodge, Zion House, Melmount Road, Sion Mills | | Gates/ Screens/ Lodges | Strabane | | B+ | HB10/07/001 | Upload another image |
| Christ Church, Bell Road, Urney, Strabane BT82 9RS | | Church | Strabane | B+ | B+ | HB10/08/005 | Upload another image |
| Glencush Bridge, Ballyheather Road, Strabane BT82 | | Bridge | Strabane | B+ | B1 | HB10/10/004 | Upload another image |
| Grange House Grange Road Bready Strabane BT82 0DT | | House | Strabane | B+ | B1 | HB10/10/009 | Upload Photo |
| St Patrick's (C of I) Church, Leckpatrick, Artigarvan, Strabane BT82 0LE | | Church | Strabane | B+ | B | HB10/11/005 | Upload Photo |
| Gray's Stationery Shop (and Printing Presses), 49 Main Street, Strabane BT82 8AU | | Shop | Strabane | B+ | B+ | HB10/12/003 | Upload another image See more images |
| Church Of The Immaculate Conception (RC), Barrack Street, Strabane BT82 8HD | | Church | Strabane | B+ | B+ | HB10/14/008 | Upload Photo |
| Christ Church (C of I) Bowling Green, Strabane BT82 8BW | | Church | Strabane | B+ | B+ | HB10/14/009 | Upload another image See more images |
| The Argory, 144 Derrycaw Road, Moy | | House | Armagh | | B+ | HB15/01/002 | Upload another image |
| EDENDERRY HOUSE, 114 MAYDOWN ROAD, BALLTMARTRIM BENBURB | | House | Armagh | | B+ | HB15/12/009 | Upload Photo |
