= W. G. K. Duncan =

Australian political scientist and academic

Walter George Keith Duncan FASSA
- Born: 11 July 1903; Leichhardt, New South Wales, Australia
- Died: 18 December 1987 (aged 84); North Adelaide, South Australia
- Spouse: Dorothy Mary Anderson

Academic background
- Doctoral advisor: Harold Laski

Academic work
- Institutions: University of Sydney; University of Adelaide

Walter George Keith Duncan FASSA, (1903-1987) was an Australian academic and political scientist.

== Education ==
Duncan was educated at Fort Street Boys' High School, Sydney, completing his education, BA and MA at the University of Sydney and PhD at the London School of Economics.

== Career ==
Duncan returned to Australia in 1932 where he taught at the University of Sydney.

Duncan joined the University of Adelaide in 1951 as the chair of history and political science. Duncan retired in 1968, but in 1973 completed a previously unfinished commissioned centenary history of the University of Adelaide.

In 1962, Duncan delivered the fourth in the annual series of ABC Boyer Lectures, "In Defence of the Common Man".

== Personal ==
Duncan was born on 11 July 1903 in Leichhardt, Sydney, to New Zealanders George Henry Duncan and Clara Walton. Duncan married Dorothy Mary Anderson in 1934, but had no children. He died on 18 December 1987.

== Honours and awards ==
- 1956 Elected Fellow of the Academy of the Social Sciences in Australia
