= Ranjit Singh of Bharatpur =

Maharaja of Bharatpur from 1778–1805

Maharaja Ranjit Singh
- Maharaja of Bharatpur; Farzand Jang
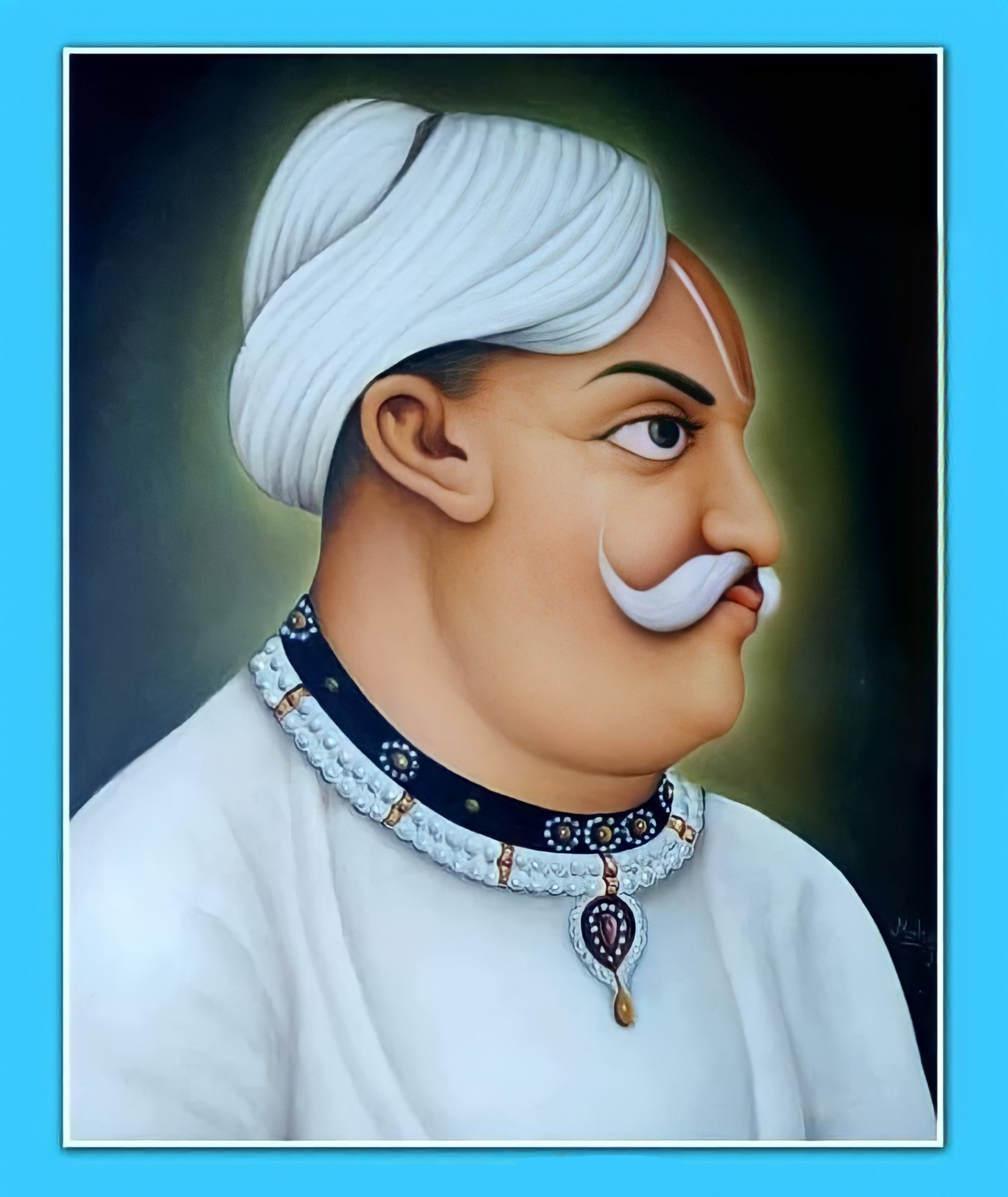
- Portrait of Maharaja Ranjit Singh
- Reign: 1777 – 1805
- Coronation: Gopal Bhavan, Deeg, 29 March 1778
- Predecessor: Kehri Singh
- Successor: Randhir Singh
- Born: 2 May 1745; Deeg
- Died: 6 December 1805 (aged 60); Govardhan
- Issue: Randhir Singh; Baldeo Singh; Lachman Singh
- House: Sinsinwar
- Father: Suraj Mal
- Religion: Hinduism

Maharaja Ranjit Singh (2 May 1745 – 6 December 1805) was the ruling Maharaja of the princely state of Bharatpur (r. 1777–1805) and the successor of Maharaja Kehri Singh, he was bestowed upon the title of Farzand Jang meaning Son of War by the Mughal Emperor Shah Alam II. He participated in the Second Anglo-Maratha War on the side of the Marathas and his forces proved to be a tough match for Lord Lake.

== Biography ==
Jawahar Singh had no sons thus he was succeeded by his brother Ratan Singh, who was murdered in 1769. Nawal Singh seized Bharatpur, while Ranjit Singh occupied Kumbhar, which Nawal Singh invaded. Ranjit Singh called in the Sikhs for help, the Sikh then set out to help Ranjit Singh. They arrived near Aligarh in January 1770, Nawal Singh marched to oppose them. The rumours of the Sikhs' ferocity terrified him so much he fled without even meeting them. The Sikhs pursued him plundering and ravaging all the way.

In 1805 war between the Britishers and the Holkar broke out. Maharaja Ranjit Singh agreed to help Yashwant Rao Holkar and the two Maharajas fell back to Bharatpur fort. The British laid siege to the fort and after three months, Ranjit Singh agreed to peace and signed a treaty with the British, thus making Bharatpur a princely state.

== See also ==
- Siege of Bharatpur (1805)
