= Lohagarh Fort =

Fort at Bharatpur District of Rajasthan

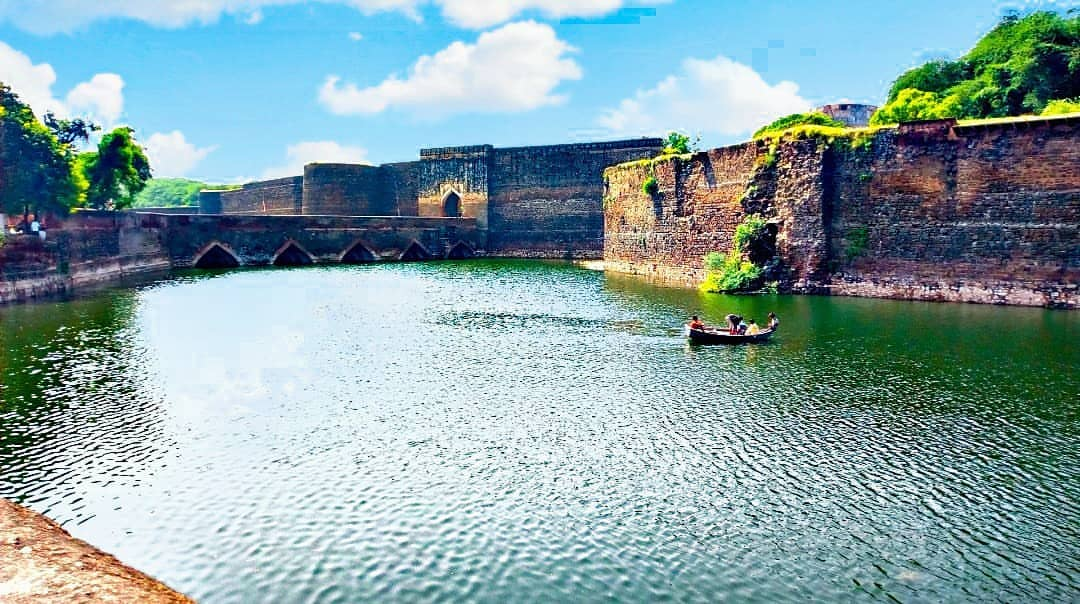
- Lohagarh Fort, Bharatpur

- Location within Rajasthan
- 27°13′13.51″N 77°29′42.938″E
- Type: Historical Landmark
- Location: Bharatpur, Rajasthan, India

History
- Founder: Maharaja Suraj Mal

Lohagarh Fort (transl. Iron Fort) is an 18th-century fort located at Bharatpur in Rajasthan, India.Maharaja Suraj Mal commissioned its construction in 1732. The British army attempted to conquer this fort 13 times. The Lohagarh Fort withstood repeated attacks of British forces led by Lord Lake during the Siege of Bharatpur in January and February 1805 when they failed in all four attempts to storm the fortress, However the Fort was successfully breached by the British East India Company on January 18, 1826, under the command of Lord Combermere, This victory during the Second Siege of Bharatpur shattered the fort's long standing reputation of being completely impregnable.

== History ==
Between December 1825 and January 1826, British troops under Lord Combermere initially surrounded the state's capital until on 18 January 1826 its fortress was stormed and captured. After this siege, Bharatpur became a princely state under British Raj control.

Of the two gates in the fort, the one in the north is known as Ashtadhatu (eight metaled) gate while the one facing the south is called Chowburja (four-pillared) gate. Monuments in the fort include are Kishori Mahal, Mahal Khas, and Kothi Khas.

Jawahar Burj was built by Maharaja Jawahar Singh in 1765 to commemorate his victory over Mughals at Battle of Delhi (1764). Jawahar Burj was also used for the coronation ceremony of the rulers. Fateh Burj was built by Raja Ranjeet Singh in 1805 for the commemoration of his win over the British at the Siege of Bharatpur (1805).

Following parts of Lohagarh Fort are recognized as Monuments of National Importance in Rajasthan - Jawahar Burj, Ashtadhatu Gateway, Moat surrounding the Fort wall, Fort walls including Chowburja gate and approach bridges at the Chowburja and Ashtadhatu gates.

These parts of the Fort are granted the status of State Protected Monuments in Rajasthan – Kamara Khas, Kishori Mahal, Hansarani Mahal, Kachahari Kala, Chaman Bagichi, Hammam & mudwall gates i.e. Mathura gate, Binarain gate, Atal Bandh gate, Anah gate, Kumher gate, Govardhan gate, Neemda gate, Chandpol gate, and bastion near Suraj pol.
