= Capture of Agra =

Siege-ending incident in 1761

Coordinates: 27.1795°N 78.0211°E

Capture of Agra Fort
- Part of Mughal-Jat Wars
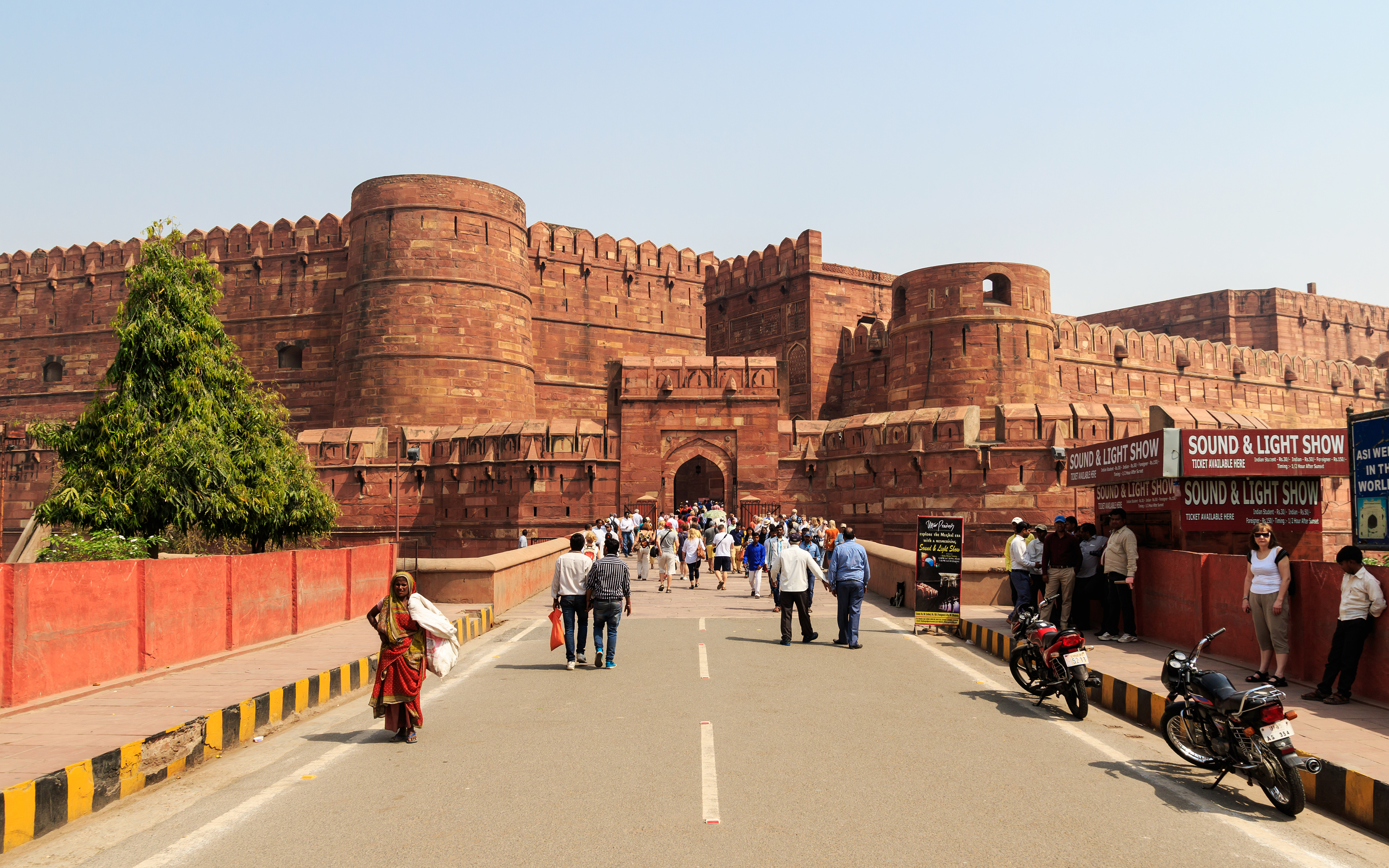
- Present-day view of Agra Fort
Date	3 May 1761–12 June 1761; 265 years ago
Location	Agra, Uttar Pradesh
Result	Jat/Bharatpur victory
Territorial changes	Agra Fort occupied by Kingdom of Bharatpur.

Belligerents
Kingdom of Bharatpur	Mughal Empire

Commanders and leaders
Maharaja Suraj Mal	Mirza Fazilka Khan; Mughal Faujdar of Agra

The Capture of Agra Fort ended a month-long siege by Jat ruler Maharaja Suraj Mal on 12 June 1761, marking the annexation of Agra into Bharatpur. After a one-month siege of Agra, the Mughal army, led by Mirza Fazilka Khan, surrendered to the Jat army. The Jats seized the old capital of the Mughal Empire. It remained in possession of Bharatpur rulers until 1774.

== Background ==
Under Suraj Mal, Jats began to expand the boundaries of their kingdom. They expanded their territory to eastern Rajasthan, western Uttar Pradesh, southern Haryana, and Delhi. The Jat ruler of Bharatpur Suraj Mal maintained control over the Braj region. He believed Agra had to be merged with his territory to dominate.

== Battle ==
Suraj Mal's army of four thousand Jat soldiers advanced towards Agra. After a month's siege, on 12 June 1761, Suraj Mal offered peace terms and promised the Qiledar, Fazilka Khan, one lakh rupees and five villages. Following the negotiation, Agra was annexed by the Jats.

== Jat Rule Over Agra ==
Following their victory, the Jats melted the two silver doors of the famous Mughal monument Taj Mahal. These silver doors were never replaced. The Jats also looted the Taj Mahal's chandeliers, carpets, jewels, and other valuables, and transported them to their capital in Deeg. Agra remained under the control of Bharatpur rulers until 1774. After the Jats captured Agra, the Taj Mahal had been severely damaged, as the mausoleum had been stuffed with straw and set on fire.

== Aftermath ==
After capturing Agra Fort, Suraj Mal became more powerful and influential. He now became the ruler of the area of Yamuna. For the Jats, the capture of Agra was an emotional moment, as in 1688, just a short distance away from the gate of this fort, Gokula, a Jat rebel, was executed by Mughal Emperor Aurangzeb. The Jats ruled Agra for 13 years from 1761 to 1774. On 18 February 1774, the Mughal Commander Mirza Najaf Khan re-captured Agra.

== See also ==
- Battle of Delhi (1764)
