= Bharatpur State =

Princely state in British India

Coordinates: 27.22°N 77.48°E

Kingdom of Bharatpur
- 1722–1947
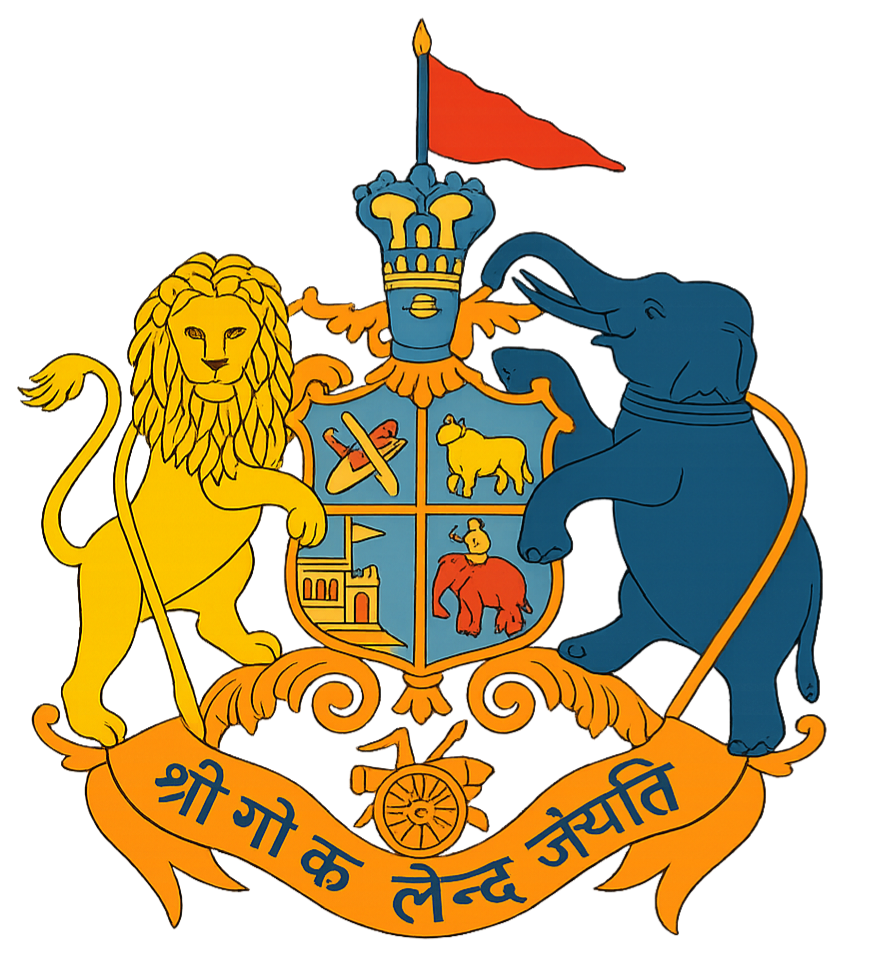
- Flag from 1722 to 1880 (top); Flag from 1880 to 1943 (bottom) Coat of arms

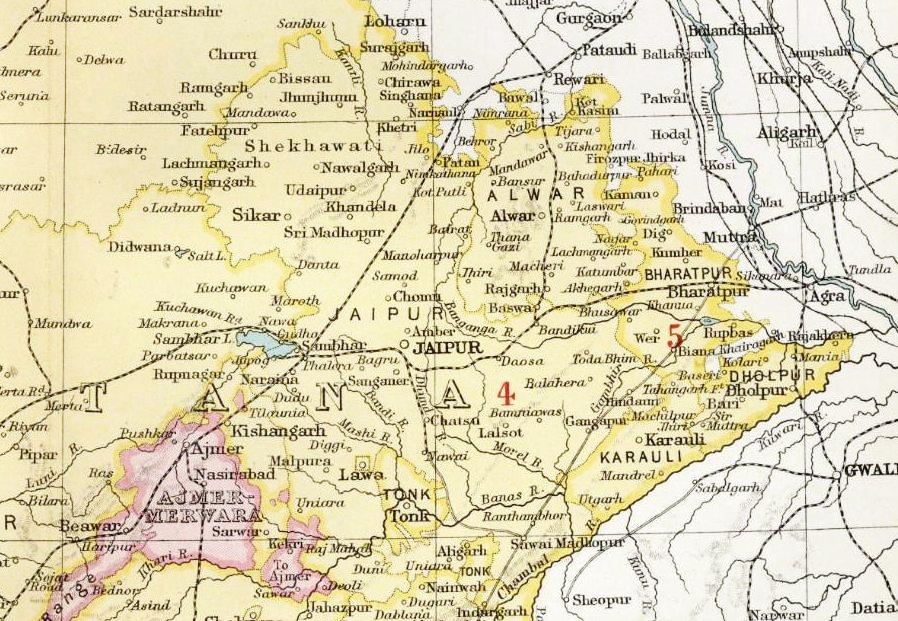
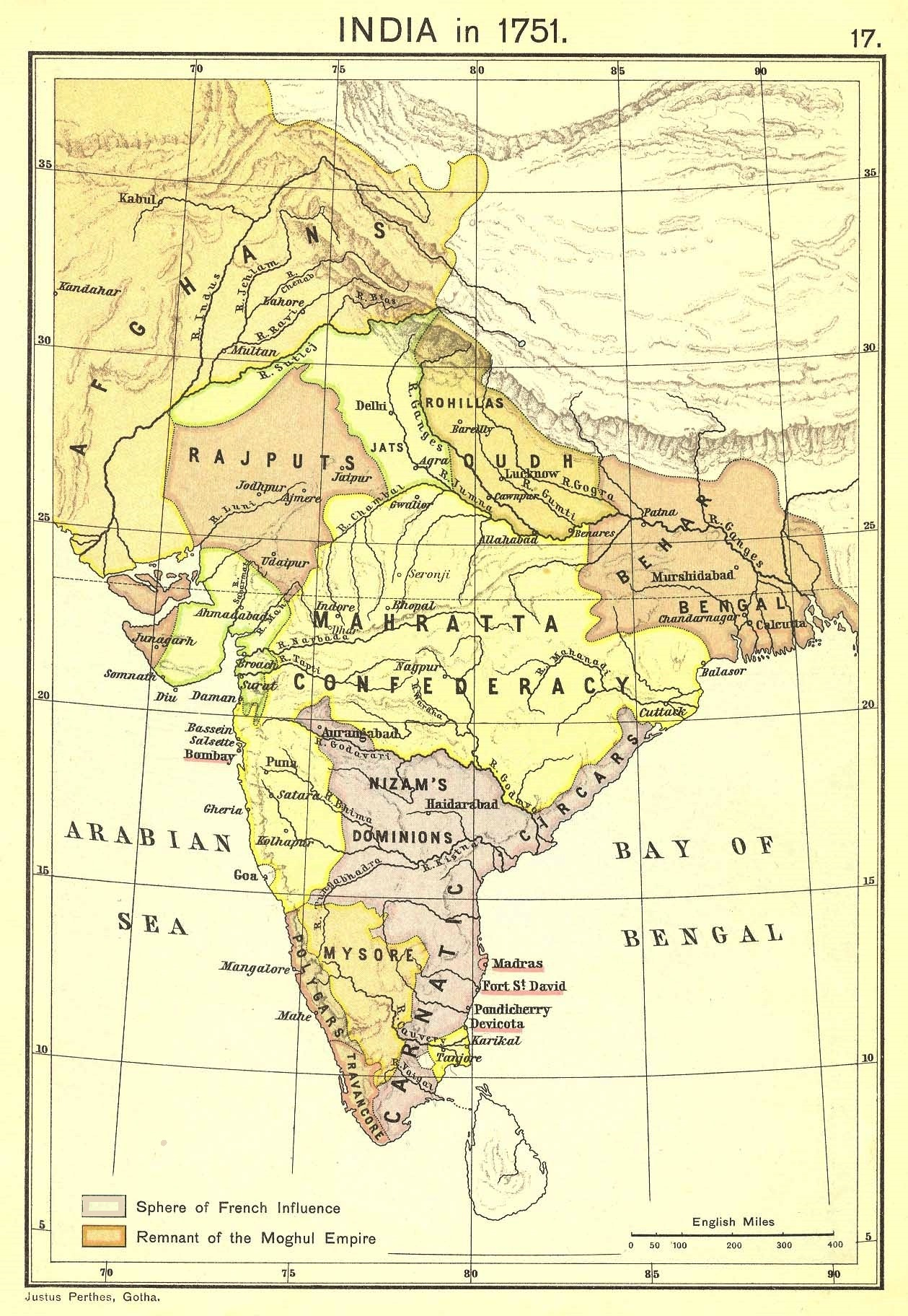
- Bharatpur State in the Imperial Gazetteer of India
- Capital: Bharatpur
- Common languages: Braj; Hindi
- Government: Tributary of the Maratha Confederacy under the House of Scindia (1722–1825); Princely state (1826–1947)
- Maharaja
  - 1722–1755 (first): Badan Singh
  - 1929–1947 (last): Brijendra Singh
- Historical era: Early-modern India
  - Established: 18 November 1722
  - End of British suzerainty; Accession to Dominion of India: 15 August 1947
Preceded by	Succeeded by
Mughal Empire	Dominion of India
- Today part of: Rajasthan (India)

Bharatpur was a tributary of the House of Scindia, and later a princely state under British suzerainty. It was ruled by the Sinsinwar clan of the Hindu Jats. The state was founded by Maharaja Badan Singh in 1722. Suraj Mal played an important role in the development and expansion of the state. During Suraj Mal's reign (1755–1763), the annual revenue of the state was 17,500,000 gold coins.

Under Suraj Mal leadership, the major architecture of this state include the Lohagarh Fort, Deeg Palace and the Keoladeo National Park, a royal hunting reserve, is a World Heritage Site.

== History ==
=== Background ===
Bharatpur was a Jat-ruled kingdom. The Jat rulers of Deeg and Bharatpur emerged in the medieval period, spreading over parts of the Subah of Agra, including Deeg, Bharatpur, and Mewat. During this time, the Jats were zamindars and cultivators causing trouble for the Mughal Empire alongside Gujars and Meos. During early time Jats were considered outcasts and jungle inhabitants. According to Tarikh-i-Firishta, in 1026 AD, a band of Jats attacked Mahmud of Ghazni on his return from Gujarat but were nearly exterminated. In 1397 AD, Timur massacred a group of Jats while marching towards Delhi. In 1526 AD, Babar army was harassed by Jats during his march through Punjab.

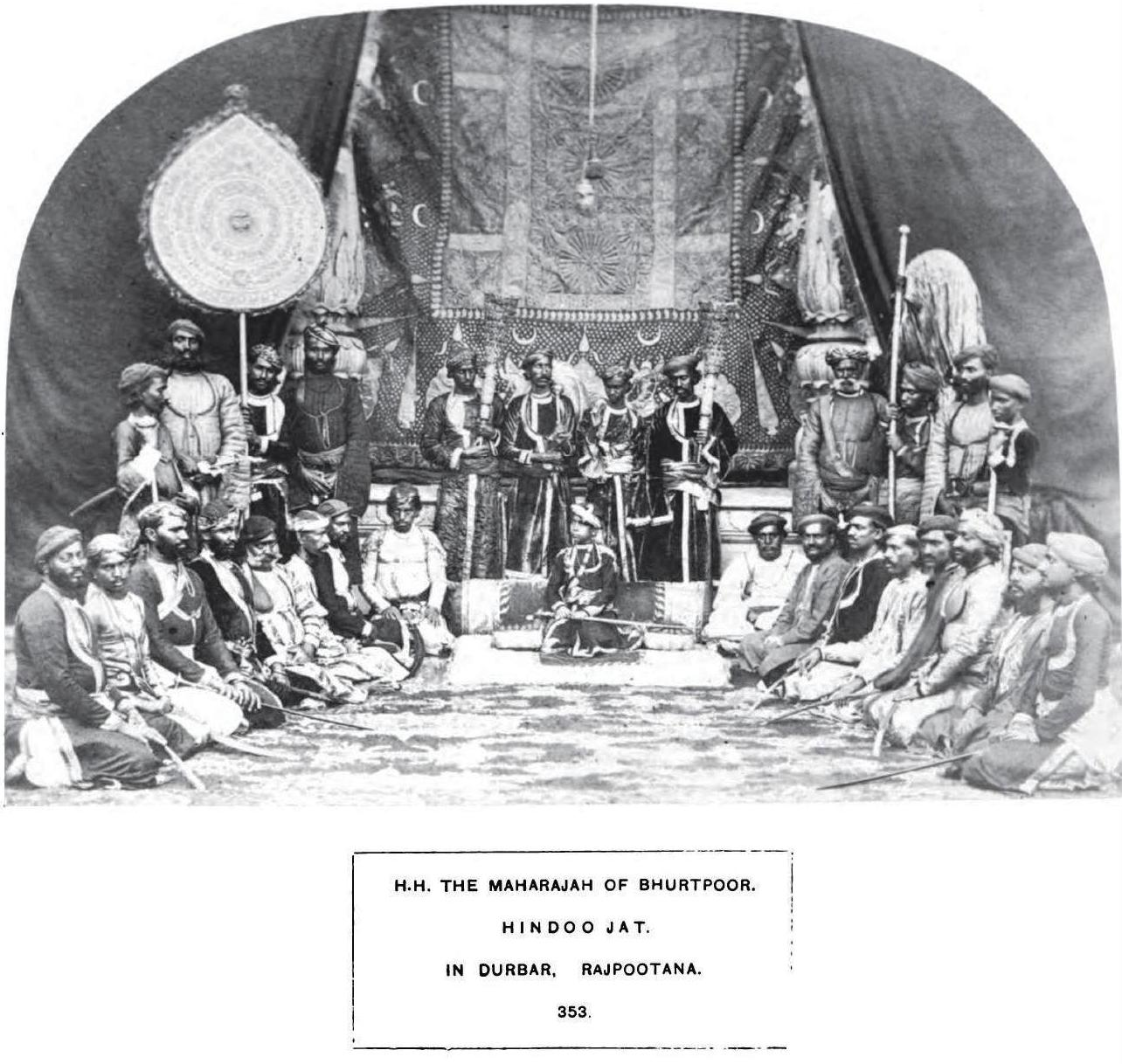
Royal court of Bharatpur Kingdom during 1860s

The Bharatpur rulers were Jats of Sinsinwar clan. According to a mythological origin, they descended from Balchand, a Yadav Rajput, through his sons Vijje and Sijje, born to a Jat concubine. They adopted the Sinsinwar gotra after being rejected as Rajputs. Ram Pande states that this legend was created "to show superiority of Sinsinwar Jats over other Jats."

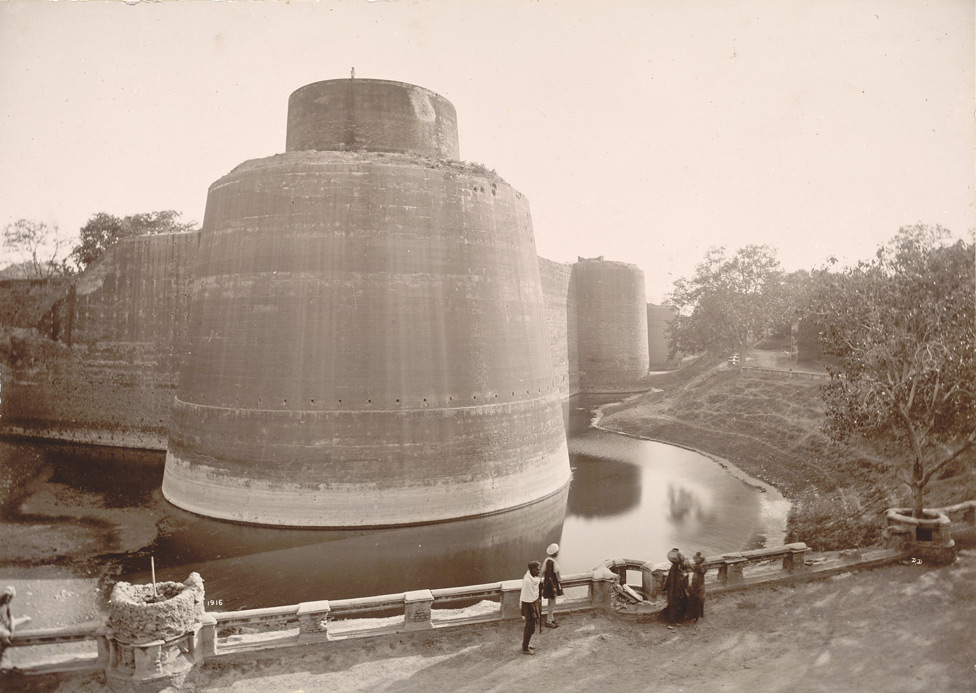
View of the Deeg Fort taken in the 1890s. Deeg was the first capital of the Sinsini Jats established by Badan Singh. Later the capital was moved to Bharatpur.

The formation of the state of Bharatpur was a result of revolts by the Jats living in the region around Delhi, Agra, and Mathura against the imperial Mughals. Gokula was a prominent Jat zamindar of Tilpat who led a rebellion against the Mughal Empire during the reign of Aurangzeb. In 1669, he spearheaded the Battle of Tilpat, where Jat farmers revolted against heavy Mughal taxation. Despite initial successes, Gokula was eventually captured and executed in 1670.

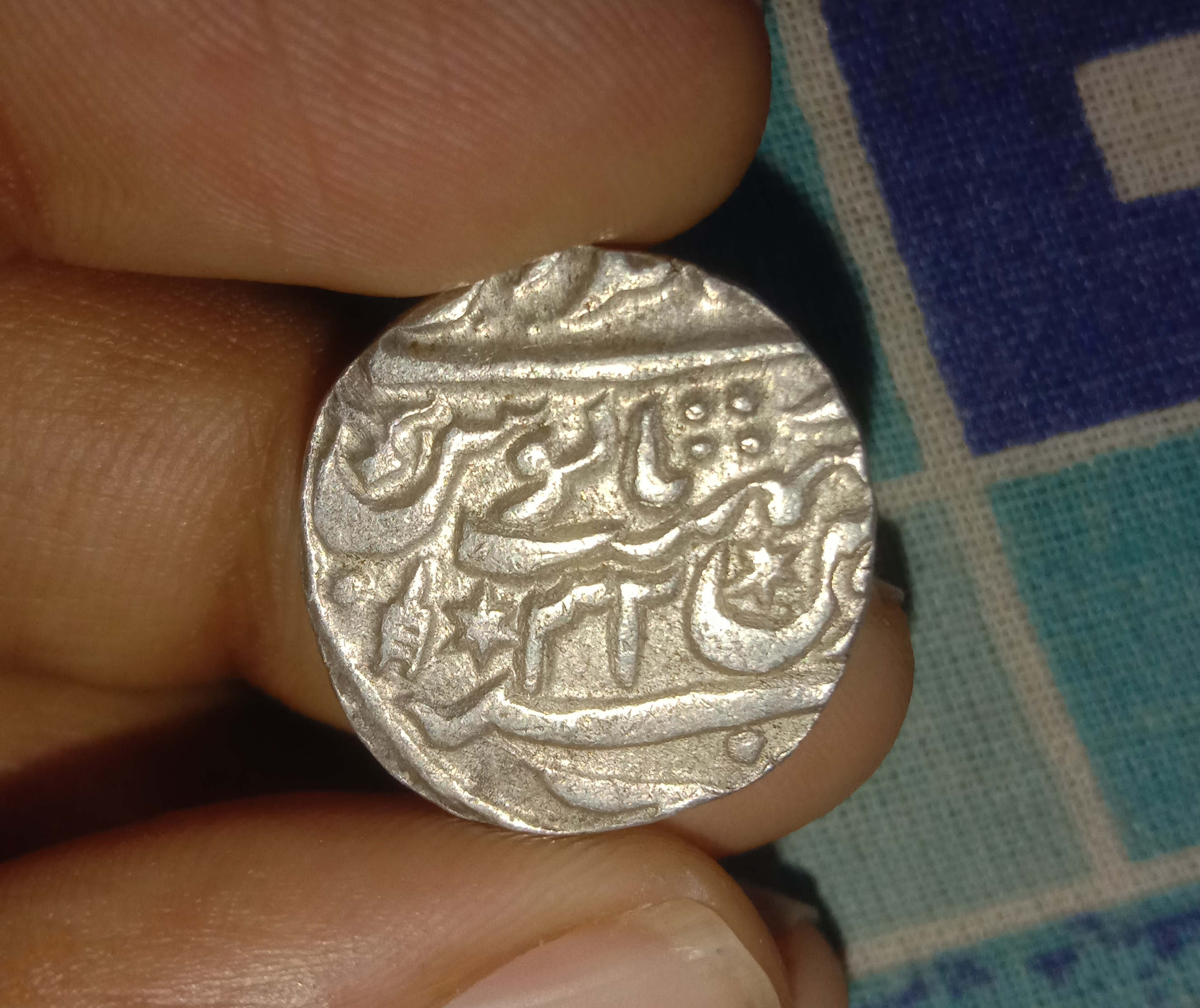
Silver Rupee of Bharatpur state, struck in the name of Mughal emperor Akbar II, Mahe Indrapur Mint.

Rajaram of Sinsini succeeded Gokula and continued the struggle against Mughal rule. He is noted for organising the Jats into a more cohesive force and avenging Gokula’s death by desecrating Akbar’s tomb. Rajaram’s leadership saw several victories against Mughal forces, including the defeat of Mughal Nawab Bahadur Khan (Mughal general). He was instrumental in consolidating Jat power in the region until his death in 1688. Now Aurangzeb approached the Kachhwaha Rajput ruler Bishan Singh to crush the uprising and appointed him as the faujdar of Mathura, granting him the entire area in zamindari. Conflict between Jats and Rajputs for zamindari rights also complicated the issue, with Jats primarily being landowners, whereas the Rajputs were primarily revenue collectors.

The Jats put up a stiff resistance but by 1691, Rajaram and his successor Churaman were compelled to submit to the Imperial Mughals. However unrest among Jats continued and later on in the beginning of the 18th century, Churaman, taking advantage of the Mughal civil wars, was able to expel the Rajputs from the area and establish an independent state where Jat chiefs formed the ruling class. Rajaram who also exhumed and burned the remains of Akbar is known for setting up a small fort at Sinsini and it was a key foundation of this kingdom.

=== Foundation ===
In the early 18th century, the two fortresses of Thoon and Sinsini were constructed by Chudamani Singh, the head of a band of plunderers and the brother of Badan Singh (whom had been imprisoned by Chudamani). Chudamani was able to repel the Mughal forces of Aurangzeb and the forces of Sawai Jai Singh of Jaipur. Chudamani's antic were opposed by his brother Badan Singh, who teamed-up with Maharaja Jai Singh and ousted Chudamani, who fled with his son Muhakam. This would lead to the formation of a Jat state by Badan Singh. Sujan Singh (Suraj Mal) was born in 1707 to Badan Singh and Rani Devaki, who became martially trained. Badan Singh became increasingly blind and forfeited power to his son Sujan Singh in 1750, with Sujan officially succeeding as maharaja in 1756.

The decline of the Mughal Empire in the second half of the 18th century allowed for the kingdom of Bharatpur to emerge as a regional power. Maharaja Suraj Mal was the most prominent ruler of Bharatpur. On 12 June 1761, he captured the significant Mughal city of Agra. During his reign, he melted the two silver doors of the Taj Mahal. Agra remained under Bharatpur’s control until 1774. After Maharaja Suraj Mal’s death, his successors continued to rule over Agra Fort. Maharaja Jawahar Singh succeeded him, followed by Maharaja Ratan Singh. During the minority of Maharaja Kehri Singh, Maharaja Nawal Singh acted as the regent.

=== British era ===
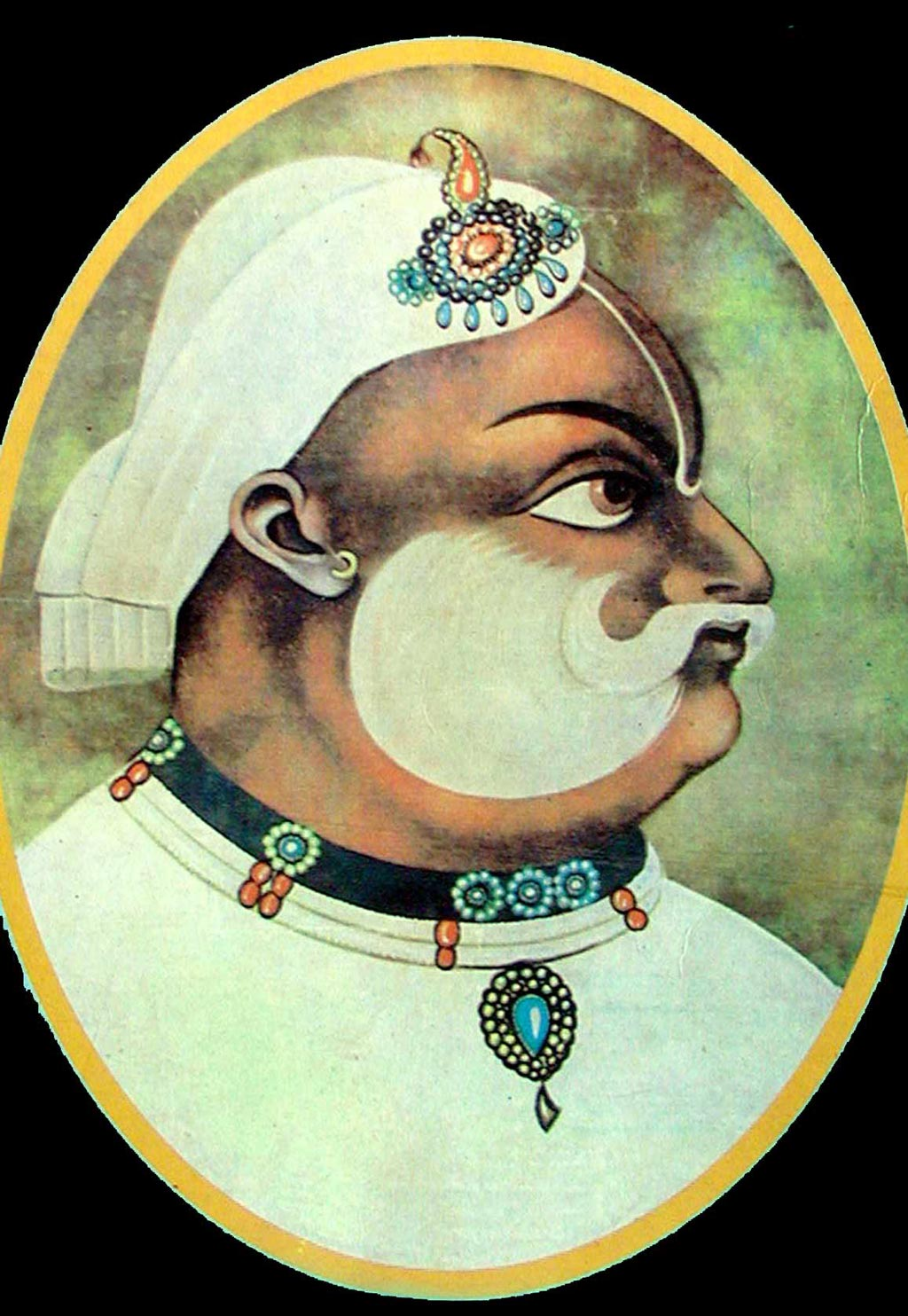
Suraj Mal, most prominent ruler of Bharatpur Kingdom

In 1805, war between the British and the Holkars broke out. Maharaja Ranjit Singh agreed to help the Holkar and the two Maharajas fell back to the Bharatpur fort. The British surrounded the fort and after three months, Ranjit Singh agreed to peace and signed a treaty with the British, thus becoming a princely state. Maharaja Jaswant Singh of Bharatpur provided great support for the British during the Indian Rebellion of 1857 and this aid was greatly acknowledged by the British. Jaswant Singh was made a G.C.S.I and his personal gun salute was increased.

=== Post-independence ===
In August 1947, Bharatpur acceded to the newly independent Dominion of India. The following year, in 1948, it became part of the Matsya Union, and in 1949, it was integrated into the state of Rajasthan. Members of the Bharatpur royal family have remained active in national and regional politics. Several family members have served as members of parliament and in the state legislature.

== List of Maharajas ==
This section includes list of Maharajas of Bharatpur in chronological order. The current titular Maharaja of Bharatpur is Vishvendra Singh since July 1995.

Portrait	Name of Maharaja	Reign	Notes
	Badan Singh	1722 - 1755	Founder of the princely state of Bharatpur.
	Suraj Mal	1755 - 1763	Son of Badan Singh. He is known for his political acumen and military prowess, he expanded his kingdom significantly and built the formidable Lohagarh Fort and Deeg Palace. He is often referred to as the Plato of the Sinsinwar Jat tribe or Jat Ullyses.
	Jawahar Singh	1763 - 1768	Son of Suraj Mal. He successfully repelled several attacks, including Ahmad Shah Abdali's, from Bharatpur. Additionally, he oversaw campaigns against the Marathas and Rohillas. With Sikh allies' assistance, he seized areas in Bundelkhand and Northern Malwa and even sacked Delhi in 1764.
	Ratan Singh	1768 - 1769	Brother of Jawahar Singh. He ruled only for about nine months.
	Kehri Singh	1769 - 1777	Son (minor) of Ratan Singh
	Ranjit Singh	1777 - 1805	Son of Suraj Mal. He participated in the Second Anglo-Maratha War on the side of the Marathas and his forces proved to be a tough match for Lord Lake
	Randhir Singh	1805 - 1823	Son of Ranjit Singh
	Baldeo Singh	1823 - 1825	Brother of Randhir Singh
	Balwant Singh	1825 - 1853	Son of Baldeo Singh
	Jaswant Singh	1853 - 1893	Son of Balwant Singh
	Ram Singh	1893 - 1900	Son of Jaswant Singh
	Kishan Singh	1900 - 1929	Son of Ram Singh
	Brijendra Singh	1929 - 1947	He was the last ruler of the princely state of Bharatpur. He was a Member of Parliament (Lok Sabha) 1962–1971. He was deprived of his royal rank, titles and honours by the Government of India on 28 December 1971.

== Expansion and decline ==
Bharatpur State, founded in 1722 by Maharaja Badan Singh, saw significant expansion under the leadership of Maharaja Suraj Mal, who ruled from 1755 to 1763, was instrumental in consolidating and expanding the state’s territories. During his reign, the state’s revenue reached an impressive 17,500,000 gold coins per annum. Suraj Mal's strategic alliances and military prowess enabled Bharatpur to withstand numerous invasions, including those from the Mughal Empire and the East India Company.

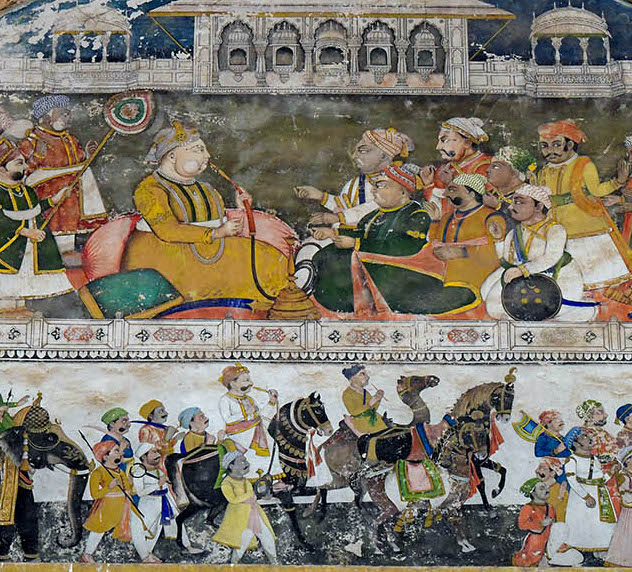
Mural depicting a durbar (court) scene of Maharaja Suraj Mal of Bharatpur, from the Samadhi of Maharaja Suraj Mal, Govardhan Hills, Mathura, Uttar Pradesh, ca.1768

Suraj Mal captured important territories such as Agra, Mathura, and parts of Aligarh. The capture of Agra in 1761, in particular, was a significant achievement, as it was a major Mughal stronghold. Suraj Mal’s forces also successfully defended Bharatpur against multiple invasions, showcasing the state’s military strength.

In the 1760s, the Kingdom of Bharatpur reached its zenith and covered present day capital Delhi and district of Agra, Aligarh, Alwar, Bharatpur, Bulandshahr, Dholpur, Etah, Etawa, Faridabad, Firozabad, Ghaziabad, Gurgaon, Hathras, Jhajjar, Kanpur Dehat, Mainpuri, Auraiya, Hapur, Firozabad, Mathura, Baghpat, Mewat, Meerut, Muzaffarnagar, Palwal, Rewari, Rohtak, Sonipat, Charkhi Dadri, Mahendragarh, Gautam Buddha Nagar. The areas under the control of Jats broadly included parts of modern eastern Rajasthan, southern Haryana, western Uttar Pradesh and Delhi.

After Suraj Mal death in 1763, Bharatpur State experienced internal conflicts and succession issues, weakening its stability. The British East India Company saw an opportunity and attacked in 1805, but Bharatpur initially resisted. However, in 1825-26, the British, led by Lord Combermere, besieged and captured the Lohagarh Fort. This ended Bharatpur’s independence, and in 1826, the state had to sign a treaty, making it a British protectorate. Jats ruled Agra for 13 years from 1761 to 1774. On 18 February 1774, the Mughal Commander Mirza Najaf Khan re-captured Agra.

== Military power ==
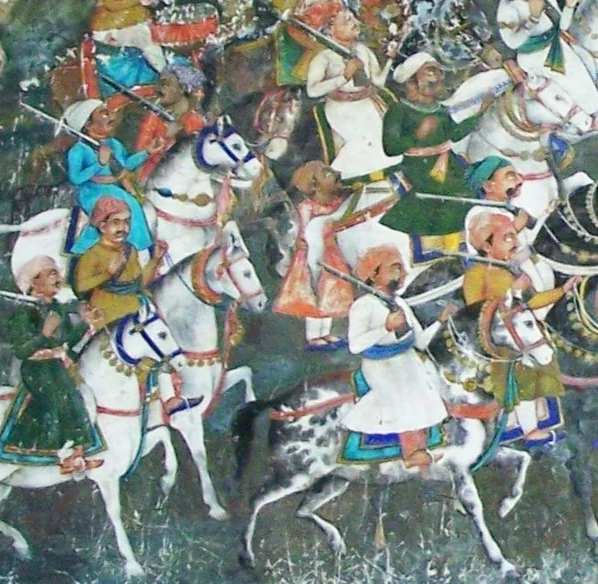
Cavalry troops, detail of a mural depicting Maharaja Suraj Mal of Bharatpur in a war procession, from the Samadhi of Maharaja Suraj Mal, Govardhan Hills, Mathura, Uttar Pradesh, ca.1768

The Kingdom during Jawahar Singh's time had a large army of 25,000 Infantry, 15,000 Cavalry and 300 pieces of cannons with addition to the troops stationed at his forts.

== Architecture ==
Bharatpur State is known for its blend of Mughal and Rajput architectural styles.

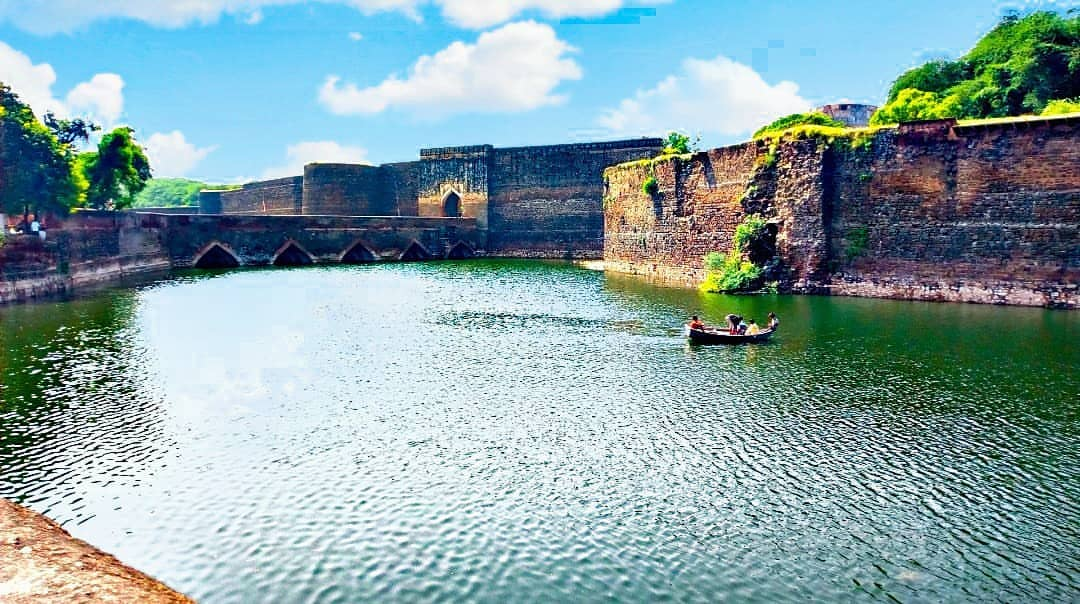
Lohagarh Fort, built by Maharaja Suraj Mal in 1732 on an artificial island and took eight years to complete.

Lohagarh Fort is one of the architectural achievement of the state. It was built by Maharaja Suraj Mal in 1732 A.D. on an artificial island and construction of this fort took almost eight years. This fort is considered as one of the strongest fort due to its formidable defense because the British forces led by Lord Lake were unable to capture the fort in spite of multiple attacks during the Siege of Bharatpur and the fort remained free from British control for more than twenty years till 1825.

Between December 1825 and January 1826, British troops under Lord Combermere initially surrounded the state's capital until on 18 January 1826 its fortress was stormed and captured. After this siege, it became princely state under British Raj control.

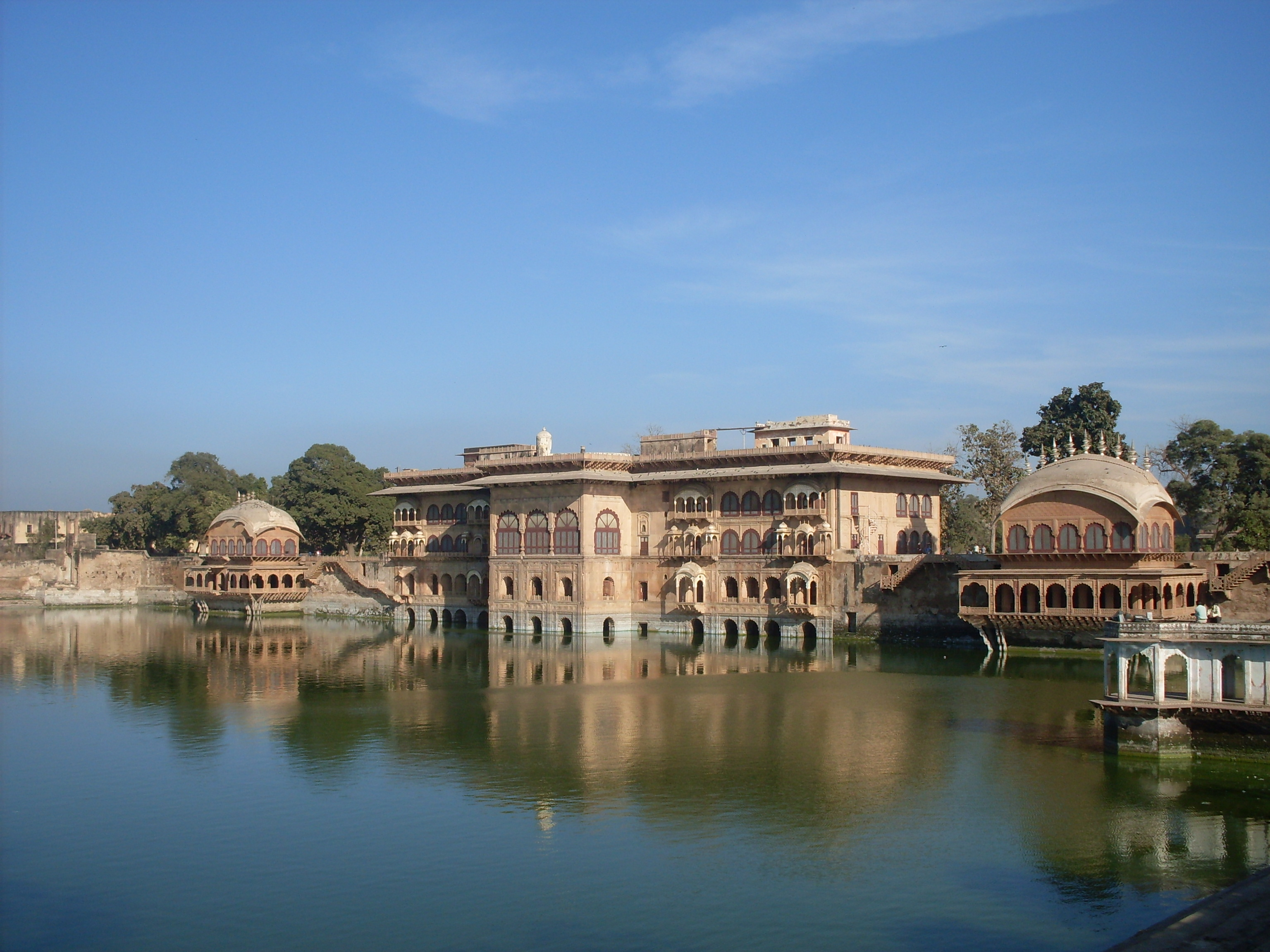
Deeg Palace, built in 1772 as a palace for the rulers of Bharatpur State.

Apart from the Lohagarh fort, the Deeg Palace was also built by the Maharaja Suraj Mal in 1730 as a luxurious summer resort for the rulers of Bharatpur State. It is the only Hindu-style palace in north India and a perfect blend of Mughal and Rajput architecture.

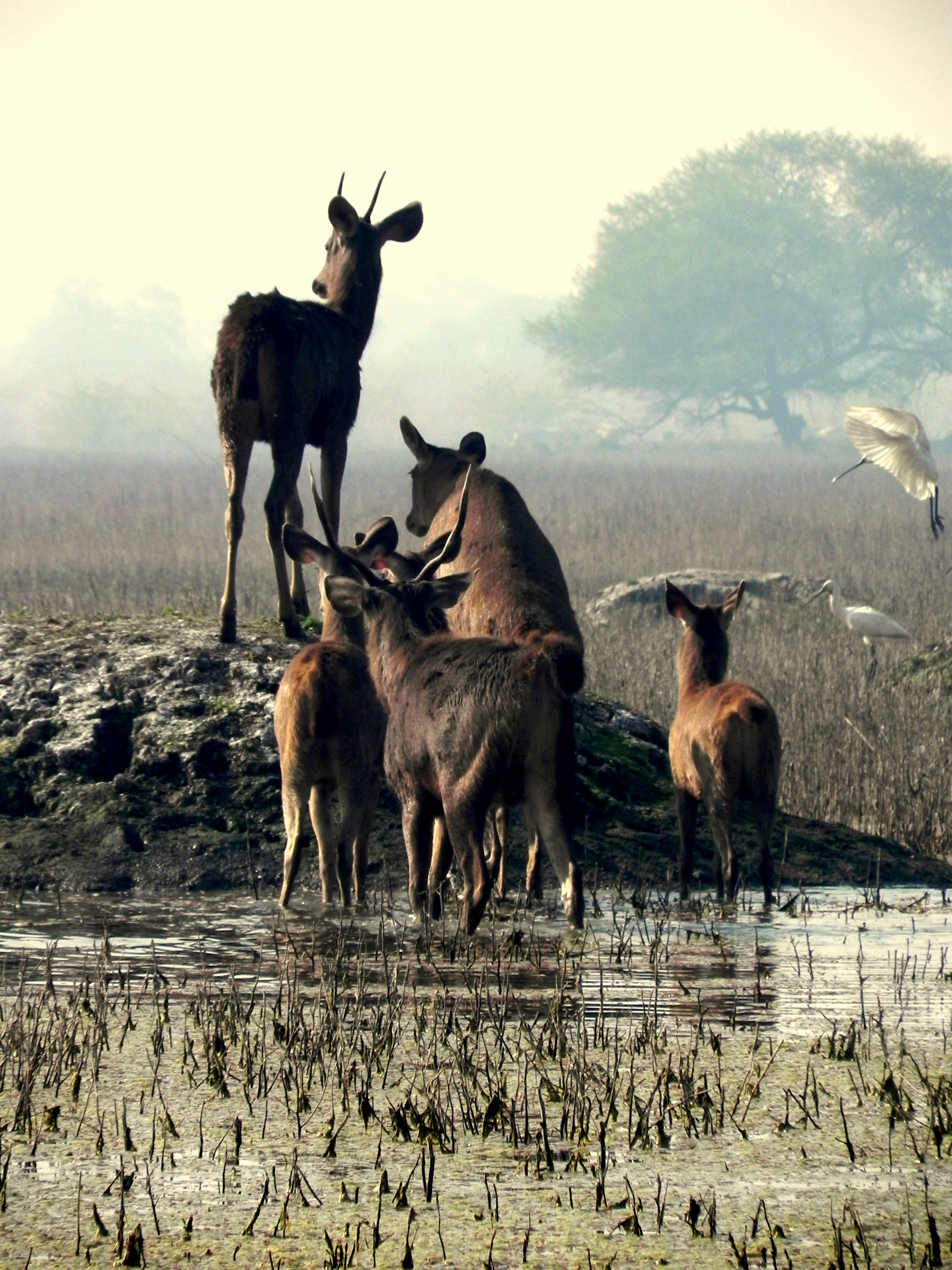
Sambar deer in Keoladeo National Park

Originally a royal hunting reserve, Keoladeo National Park was developed by Maharaja Suraj Mal. It is now a UNESCO World Heritage Site and a bird sanctuary.

== See also ==
- Battle of Pichuna

== Notes ==
- Imperial Gazetteer of India Vol 8, P-73 Bharatpur State
- R. C. Majumdar, H.C. Raychaudhury, Kalikaranjan Datta: An Advanced History of India, fourth edition, 1978, ISBN 0-333-90298-X, p. 535-36

Attribution
