= Randhir Singh of Bharatpur =

Maharaja of Bharatpur from 1805–1823

Maharaja Randhir Singh
- Maharaja of Bharatpur
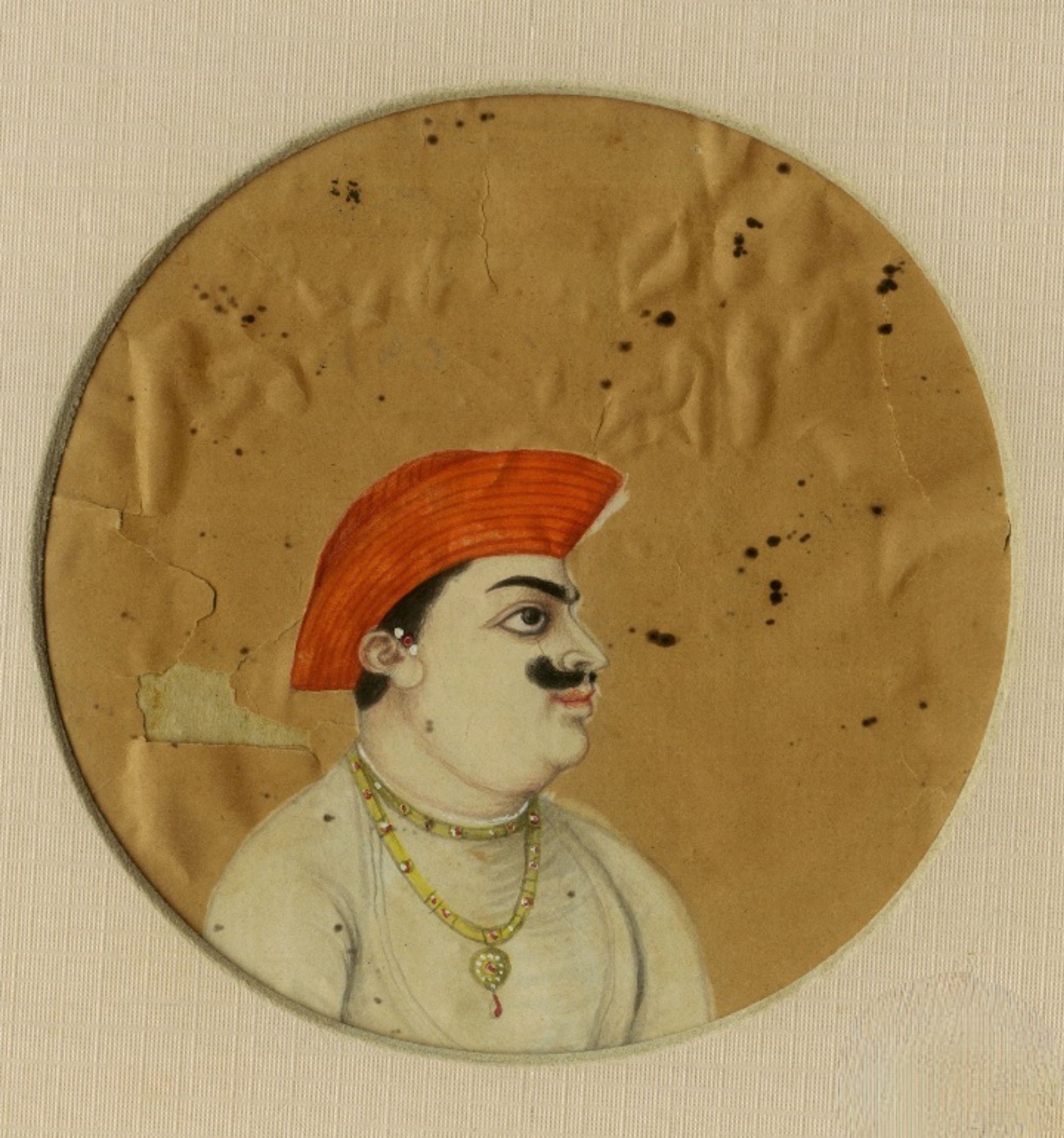
- Painting of Maharaja Randhir Singh
- Reign: 1805–1823
- Predecessor: Ranjit Singh
- Successor: Baldeo Singh
- House: Sinsinwar
- Father: Ranjit Singh
- Religion: Hinduism

Randhir Singh (r.1805–1823) (महाराजा रणधीर सिंह) was the ruler of the Princely state of Bharatpur and the successor of Ranjit Singh of Bharatpur. Randhir Singh ascended the throne after death of his father Ranjit Singh in 1805.

Randhir Singh tried to improve the state administration in various ways. He abolished the huge army that was creating disturbances and rebels due to delay in payment of salaries in order to maintain peace and reduced taxes in the state. He aided the Britishers in reducing the terror of Pindaris. He ruled Bharatpur for 18 years with harmony and vision.

He constructed a chhatri and palace in memory of his father Ranjit Singh. He had no son. He died in 1823. His successor was his brother Baldeo Singh.
