= Battle of Delhi (1764) =

1764 battle in Delhi between the Bharatpur Jat State and the Mughal Empire

- Part of Decline of the Mughal Empire and Sikh attacks on Delhi
Date	November 1764 – February 1765
Location	Delhi, India
Result	Kingdom of Rohilkhand victory

Belligerents
Kingdom of Bharatpur; Reinforced by: Maratha Empire; Indore State; Dal Khalsa	Kingdom of Rohilkhand

Commanders and leaders
Jawahar Singh; Malhar Rao Holkar	Najib ad-Dawlah

Strength
Bharatpur: 30,000; Maratha: 20,000; Sikh: 15,000; Total: 65,000	Unknown

Casualties and losses
Heavy	Heavy

The Battle of Delhi (1764) was fought between the ruler of Kingdom of Bharatpur and the Rohilkhand Kingdom. Jawahar Singh of Bharatpur invaded and plundered Delhi with the military support of the Marathas of Holkar dynasty and Sikh cavalry. However failed to yield any success.

== Background ==
On 25 December 1763, Najib-ad Daulah accidentally shot Jawahar Singh's father Maharaja Suraj Mal, leading to his demise. Maharaja Sawai Jawahar Singh started preparing to avenge the death of his father. Jawahar Singh assembled a large force by hiring 20,000 Marathas under Malhar Rao Holkar and later adding 15,000 Sikhs. Besides these, he had about 30,000 of his own troops. Najib then dispatched his agent Meghraj to Ahmad Shah Abdali in Kandahar seeking help. Since the direct road through Lahore was blocked by the Sikhs, Meghraj travelled via the foothills through Jammu.

== Battles ==
Jawahir Singh besieged Delhi in early November 1764. On 15 November, both sides fought, losing nearly 1,000 men. Jawahar Singh advanced to the Rohilla trenches and asked Malhar Holkar to support him in the assault, but Malhar halted far behind and refused to move. Jawahir Singh then sent a detachment across the Jamuna to destroy Najib's bridge of boats and attack the Rohila's from the rear. The Jat troops wasted time plundering Patparganj. Najib sent a strong contingent against them. Many Jats were slain; the rest were saved by Naga troops sent by Jawahar Singh. The battle lasted till sunset. On 18 November, Jawahar Singh pitched his guns on the eastern bank of the Jamuna near Shahdara and bombarded the city for a fortnight. Early in January 1765, 12,000 to 15,000 Sikhs arrived near Delhi. Jawahar Singh met their chiefs. It was decided that the Sikhs would attack from the north and stop supplies from the west. Later, 10,000 Naga sanyasis under Umaro Gir Gosain were hired by Jawahar Singh. Several fierce battles were fought, but Najib’s superior generalship saved the city. Delhi faced severe famine and the Rohilla troops were hard-pressed. Jawahar Singh had no trustworthy friend. Malhar Holkar had been bribed by Najib. Imad joined Malhar in favour of the Rohillas. Even old Jat captains did not fully co-operate. Disgusted, Jawahar Singh opened peace negotiations. Najib accepted and visited Malhar and Jawahir Singh on 9 February 1765. Jawahir Singh retired from Delhi on 16 February after spending nearly two crores of rupees without achieving anything.

== Aftermath ==
In early 1766, Sikhs raided Najib's territories up to Sonipat–Panipat. On 17 April they plundered Patparganj but were driven off by Afzal Khan's men. Najib pursued them, surprised them at Kutanaghat, defeated them, recovered most booty, and forced them to withdraw across the Jamuna.

== See also ==
- Plunder of Old Delhi (1753)
- Capture of Agra (1761)
- Battle of Delhi (disambiguation)

== Bibliography ==
- Banerjee, A. C.; Ghose, D. K., eds. (1970). A Comprehensive History of India. Vol. 9. People's Publishing House.
