= Ratan Singh of Bharatpur =

Maharaja of Bharatpur from 1768 to 1769

Maharaja Ratan Singh
- Maharaja of Bharatpur
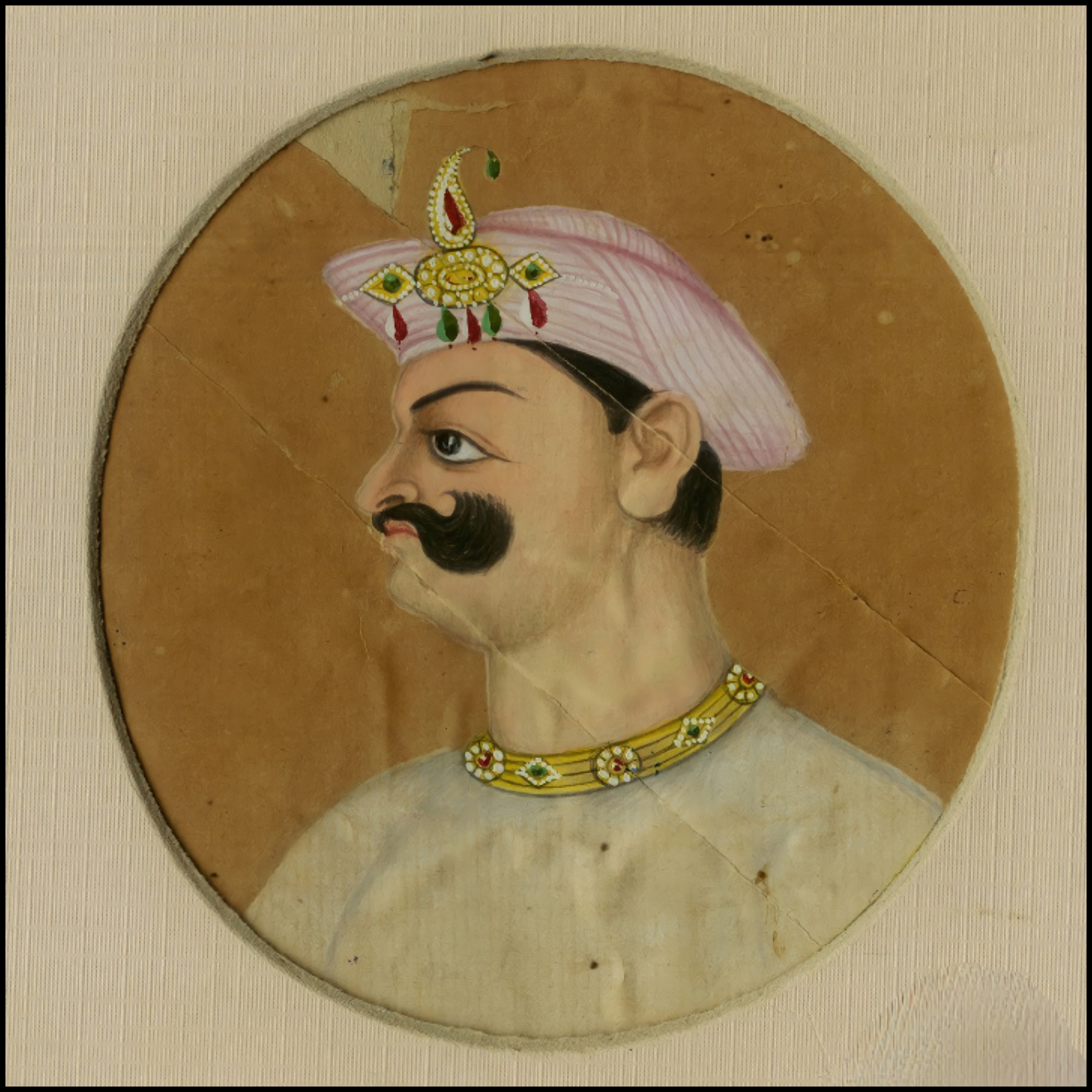
- Portrait of Maharaja Ratan Singh
- Reign: 28 August 1768 –11 April 1769
- Coronation: 28 August 1768, Deeg
- Predecessor: Jawahar Singh
- Successor: Kehri Singh
- Died: 11 April 1769; Vrindavan (Brindaban)
- House: Sinsinwar
- Father: Suraj Mal
- Mother: Ganga Devi
- Religion: Hinduism

Ratan Singh was the ruling Maharaja of the princely state of Bharatpur from 1768 to 1769.

He ascended the throne after the assassination of his brother Maharaja Jawahar Singh.

== Biography ==
Soon after becoming ruler, Ratan Singh turned entirely to a life of luxury and celebration. As the new lord of Braja-mandal, he went on a pilgrimage to Vrindavan and hosted extravagant shows by the Jamuna River with 4,000 dancing girls. He also hired a Brahmin monk named Gosain Rupanand, reputed for his skill in alchemy, to find the Philosopher’s stone. However, when the trickster who had swindled the Rajah of money realized he could not escape punishment, he attempted to kill the Rajah during a secret metal-transmutation experiment in his tent. The Rajah’s servants quickly killed him, while Ratan Singh survived for a few more hours (8 April 1769).

Ratan Singh of Bharatpur Sinsiniwar Jat Dynasty Born: ? ? Died: 1769
Regnal titles
Preceded by Maharaja Jawahar Singh	Maharaja of Bharatpur; 28 August 1768 –11 April 1769	Succeeded by Maharaja Keshri Singh
