= Deeg Palace =

Historical monument in Rajasthan, India

Coordinates: 27.47087°N 77.32907°E

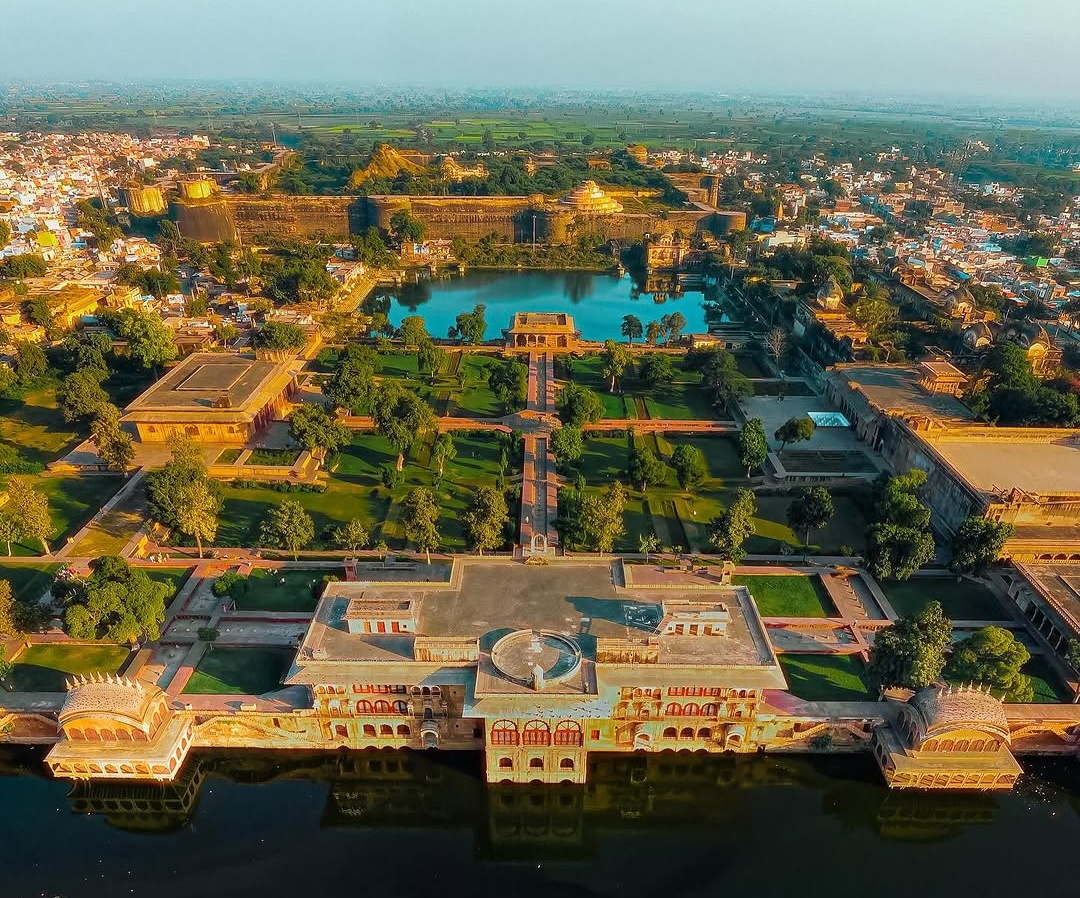
- Drone view of palace

General information
- Architectural style: Mughal & Rajput style
- Location: Deeg district, Rajasthan, India
- Completed: 1772
- Owner: Kingdom of Bharatpur; Government of Rajasthan

Deeg Palace is a historical monument in Deeg district in the Indian state of Rajasthan built in the 18th century as a luxurious summer resort by the rulers of the Bharatpur State. It was strategically positioned near Agra and served as a refuge during invasions. It is the only Hindu-style palace in North India and it is a perfect blend of Mughal and Rajput architecture. The palace was in use until the early 1970s and currently it is preserved as a monument by the Government of Rajasthan.

== History ==
Deeg Palace was built around the early 18th century by Maharaja Badan Singh, a Hindu Jat ruler and founder of the Bharatpur State. It was later renovated and expanded by his son, Maharaja Suraj Mal. The palace served as a fortified summer retreat and administrative centre.

Key structures within the palace include Gopal Bhavan, a two-story residence with arches and frescoes; Suraj Bhavan, a marble pavilion with carved inlays; and Keshav Bhavan, an open pavilion with a water system simulating rain. The complex has charbagh-style gardens, over 500 fountains, and a hydraulic system using terracotta pipes fed by nearby reservoirs like Gopal Sagar.

The palace was fortified with high walls, bastions, and a moat. It withstood several sieges but declined after Suraj Mal's death in 1763, later partially restored by the Archaeological Survey of India. The palace was in use up to the 1970s and has since been preserved as a monument.

== Gallery ==
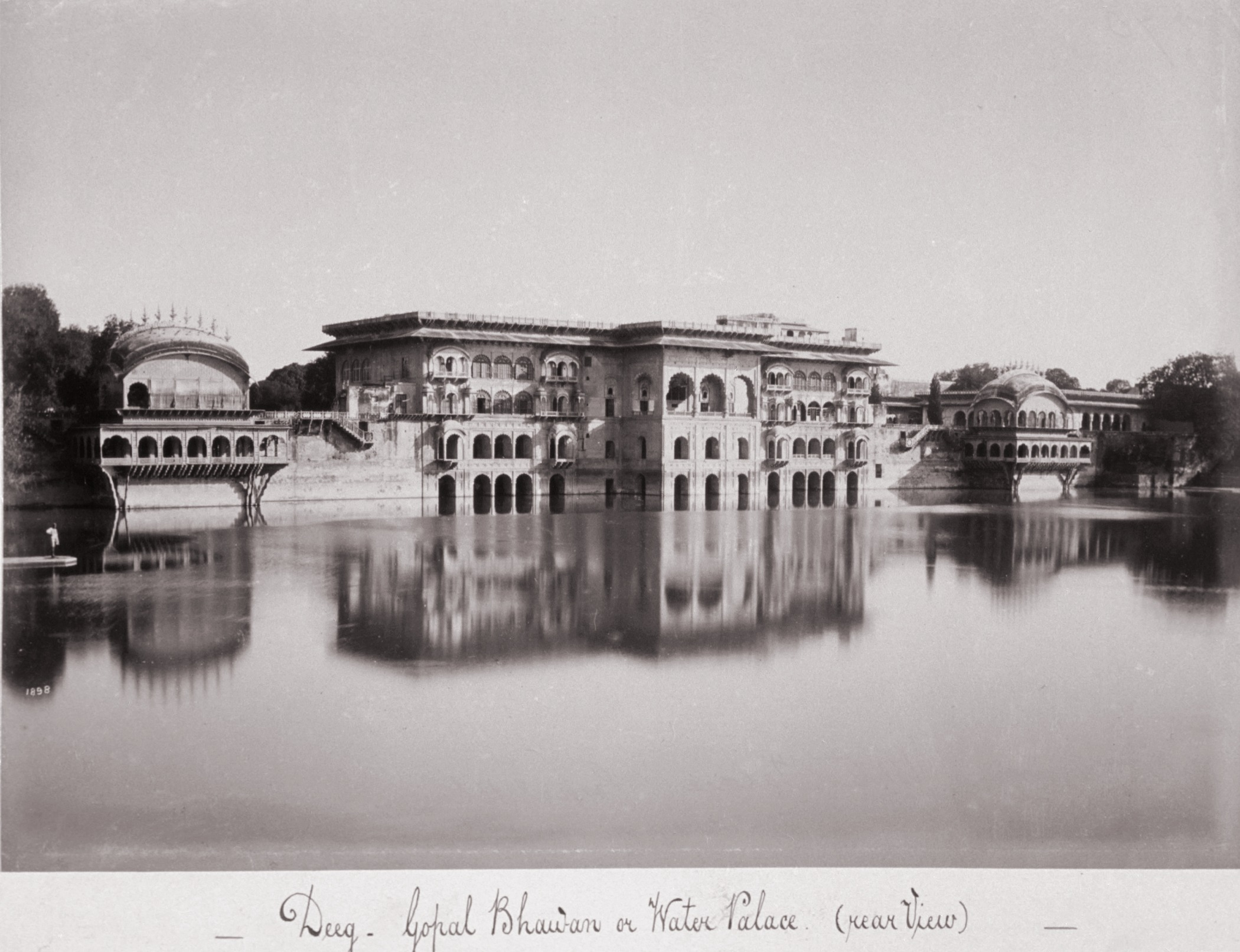
Deeg, Gopal Bhawan or Water Palace LACMA

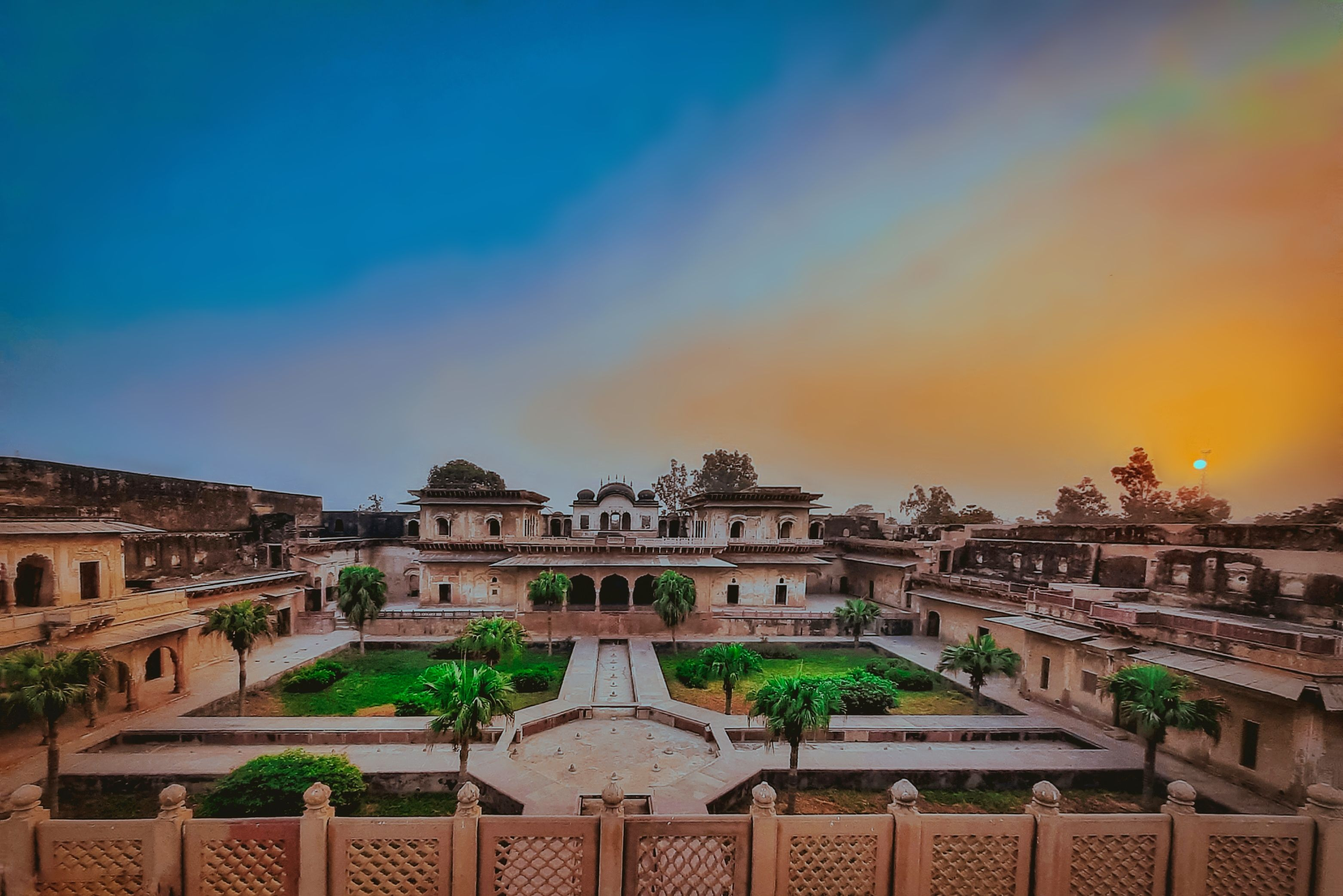
Chaar Baag

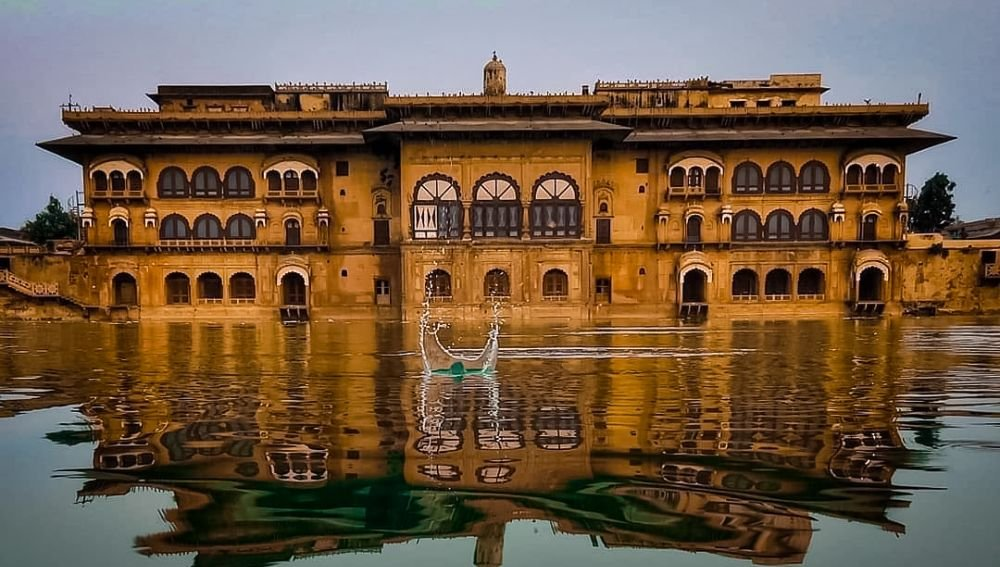
Gopal Bhavan (Rear view)

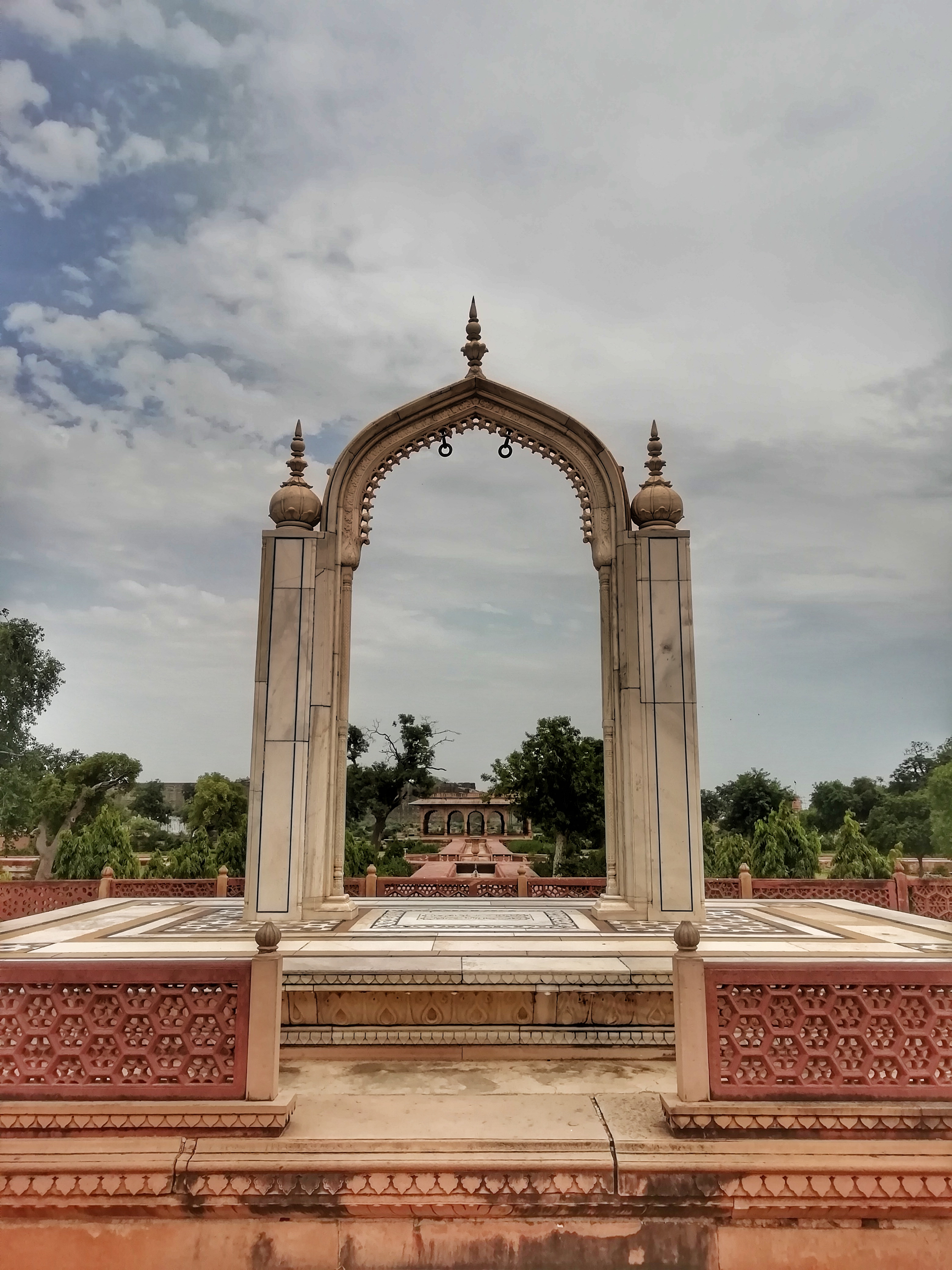
Noorjahan ka jhoola

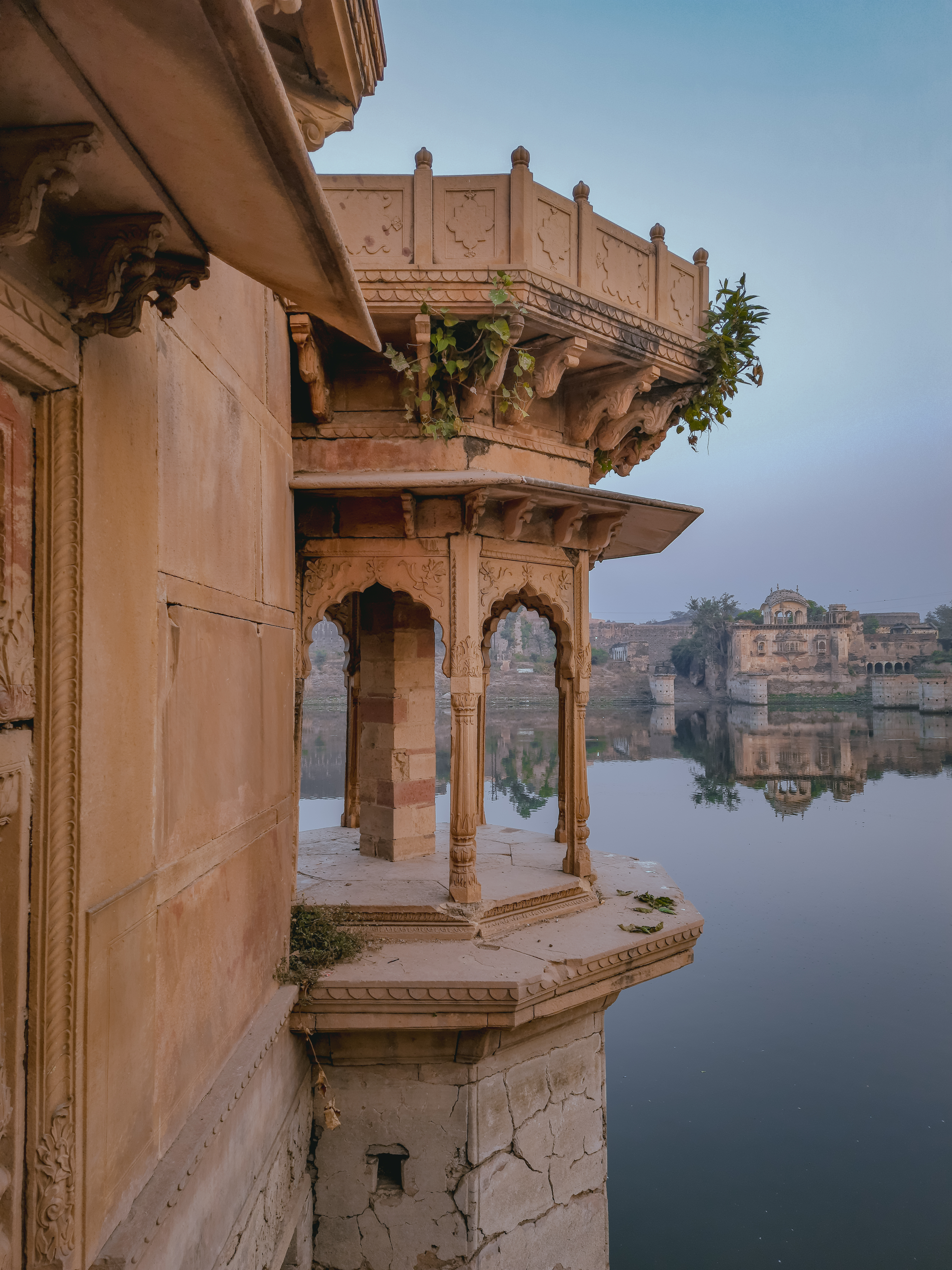
Seeshmahal facing roopsagar

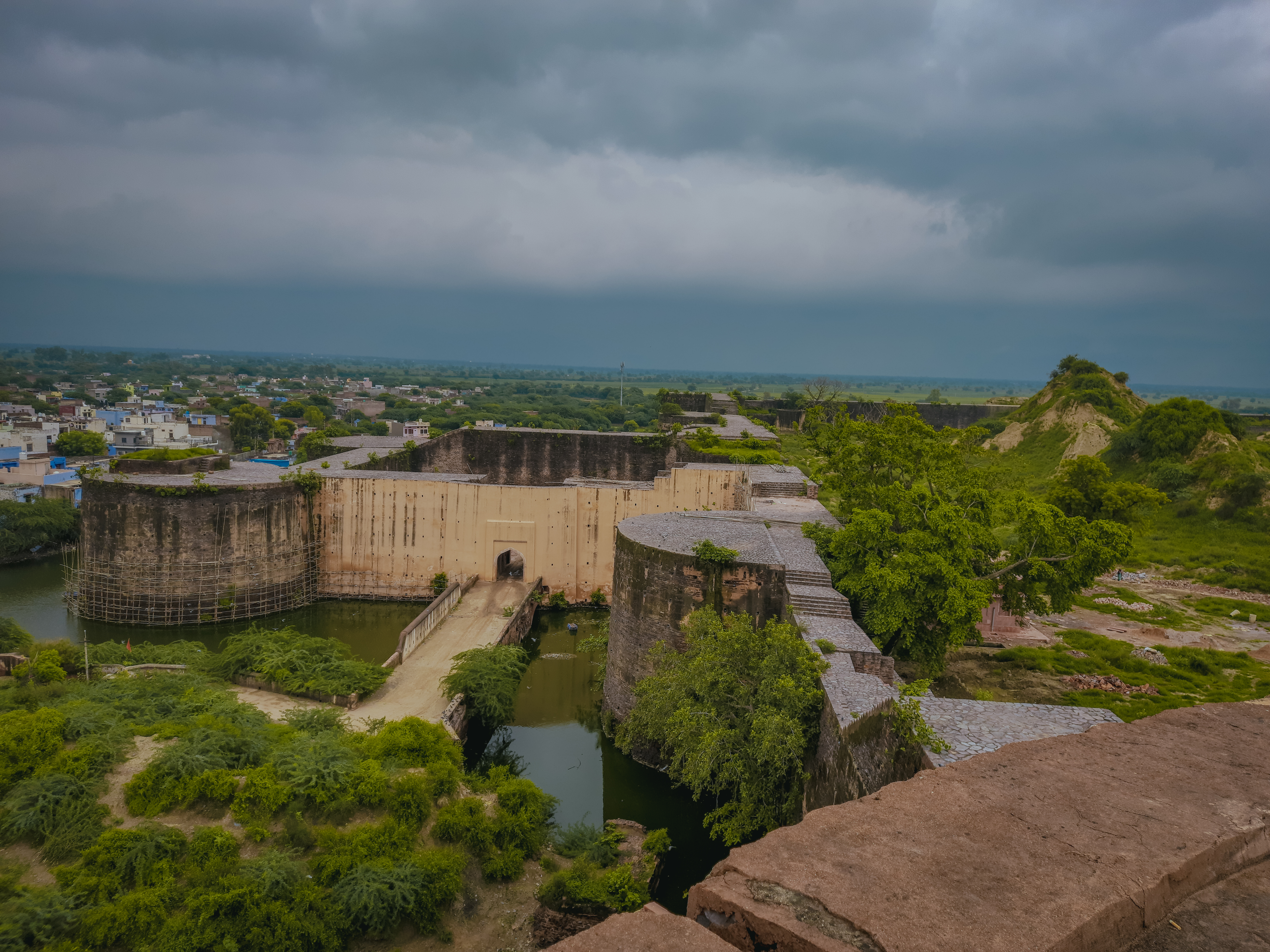
Deeg Fort

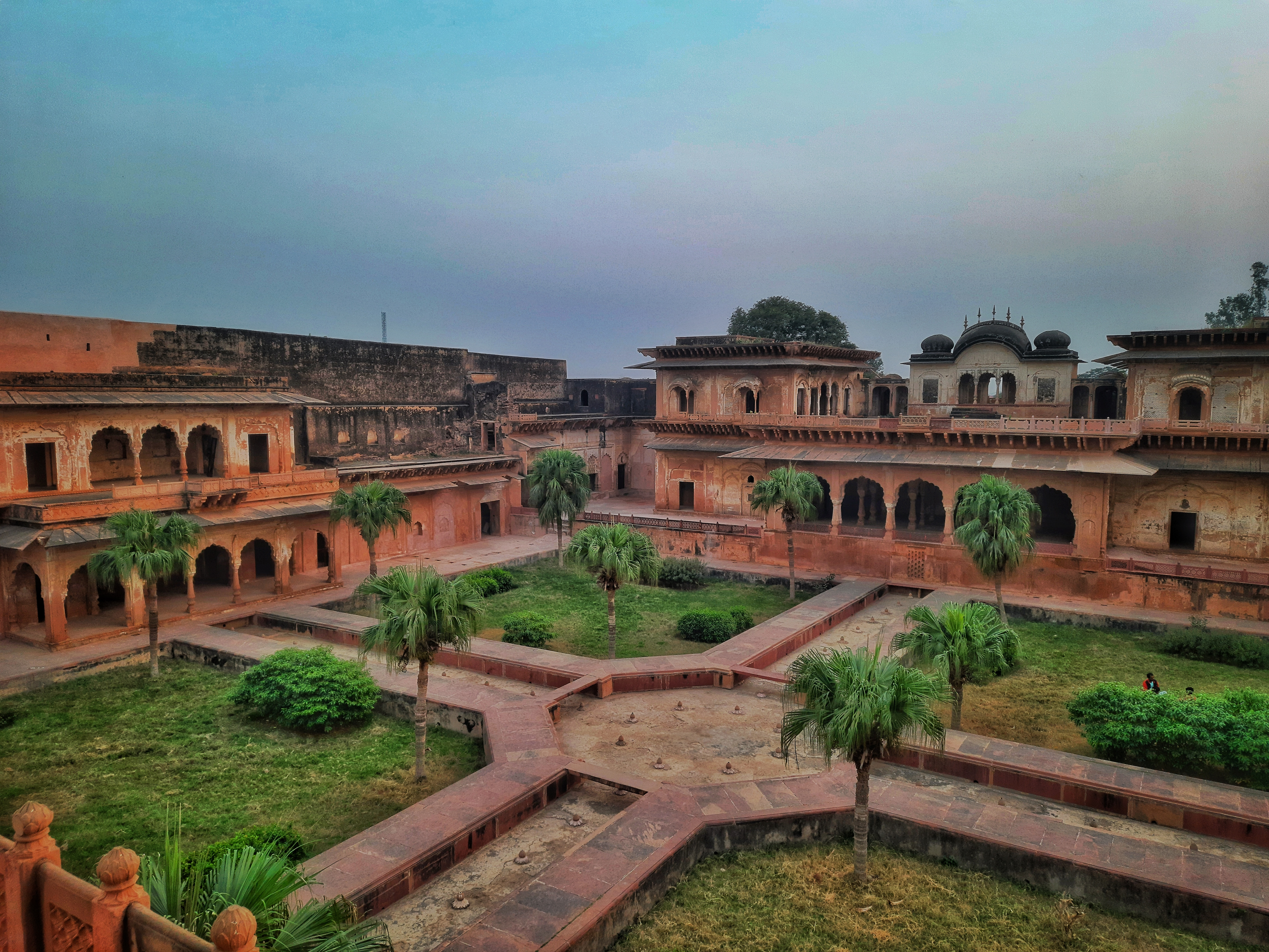
Hardev Bhawan

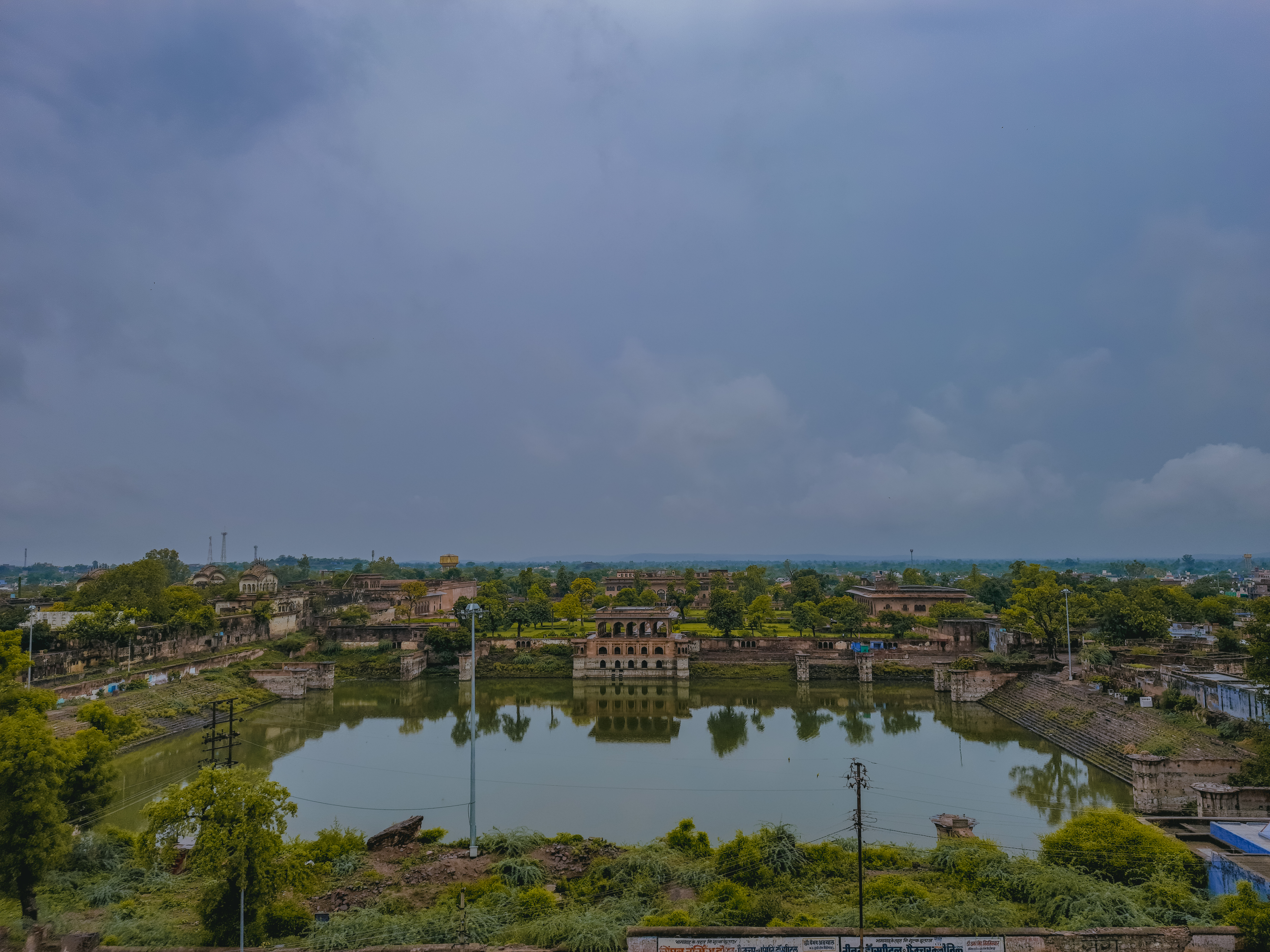
Roop Sagar (fort view)

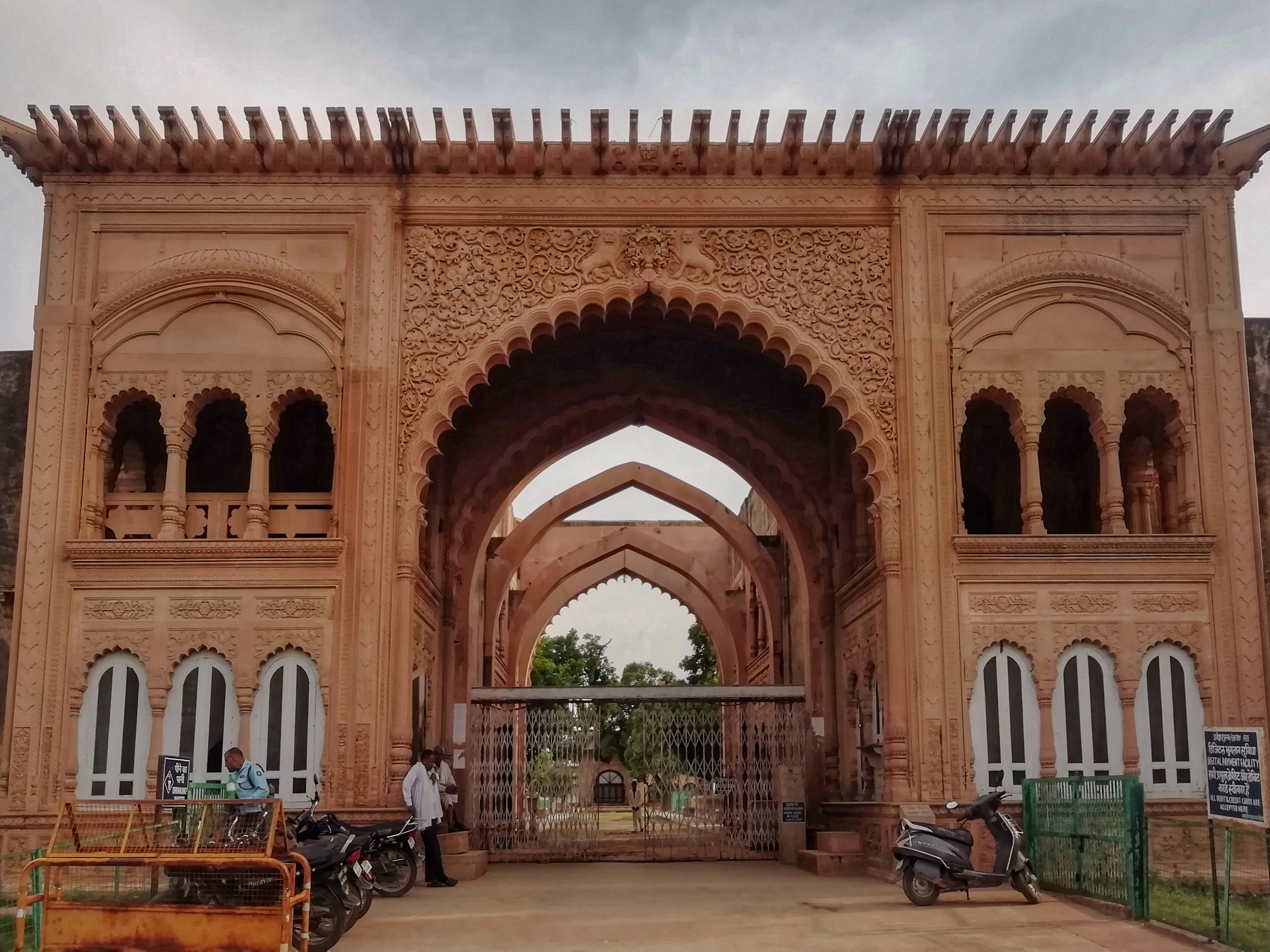
Singhpole Gate

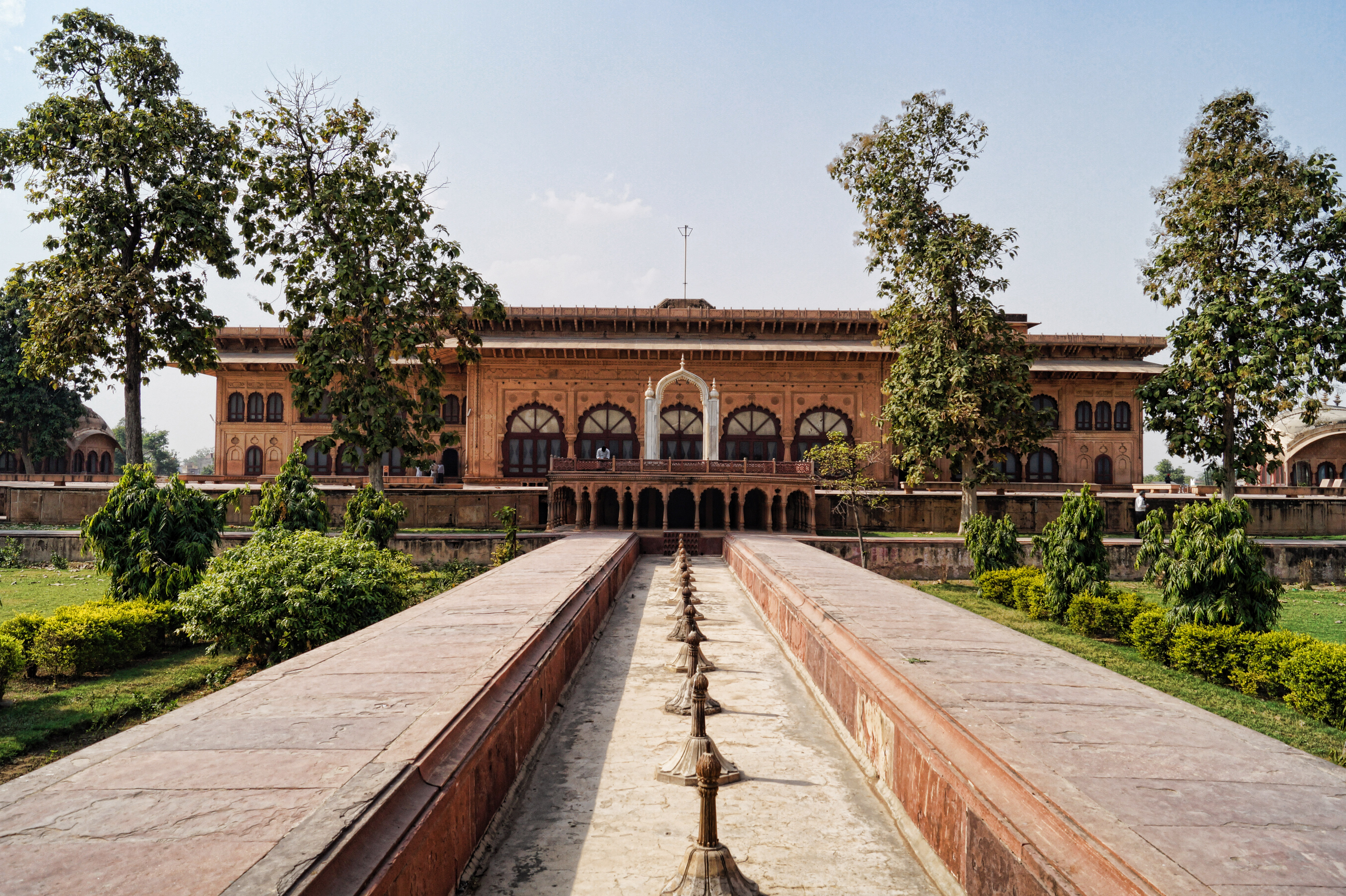
Gopal Bhawan (front view)

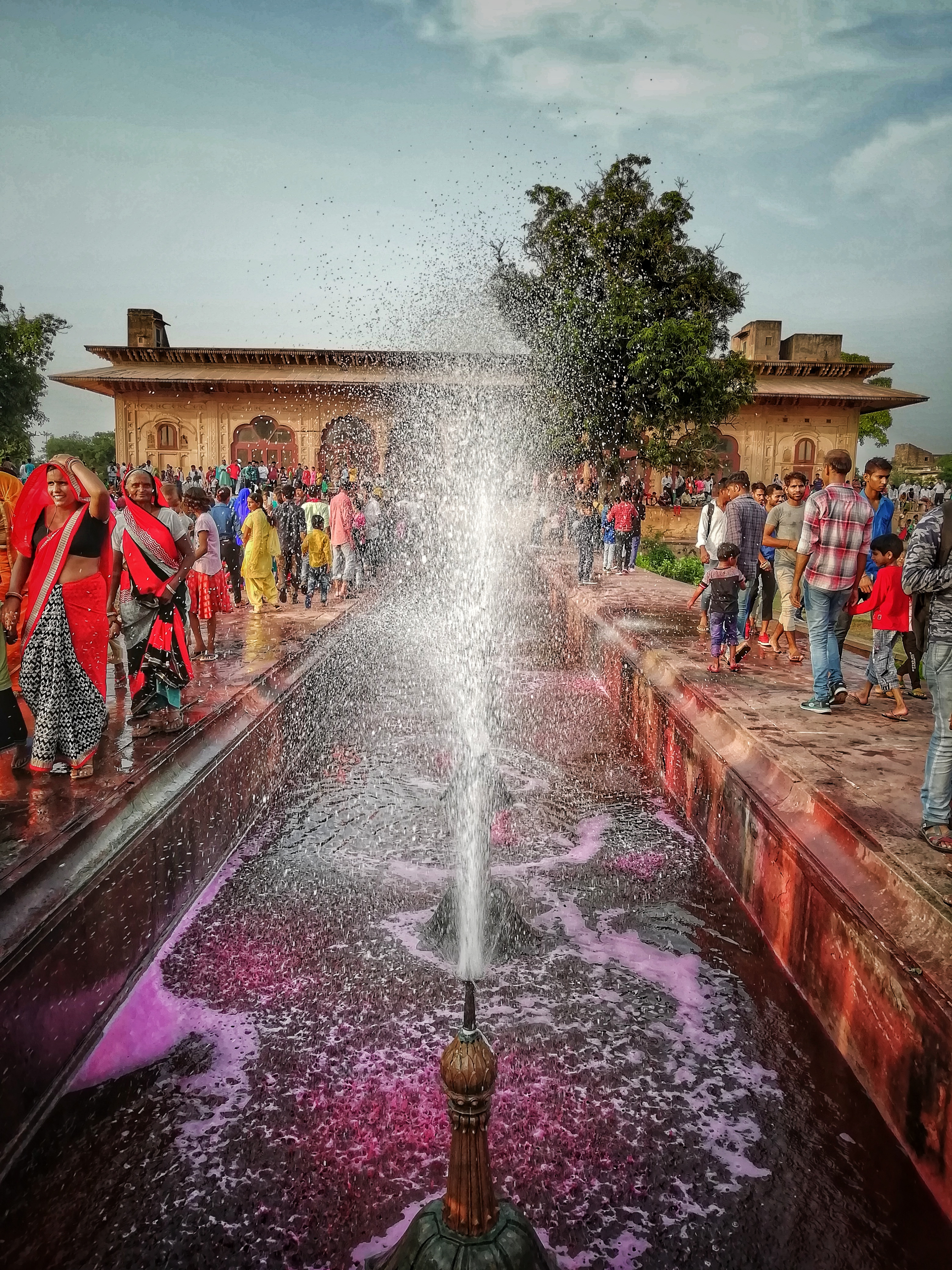
Colourful Fountains

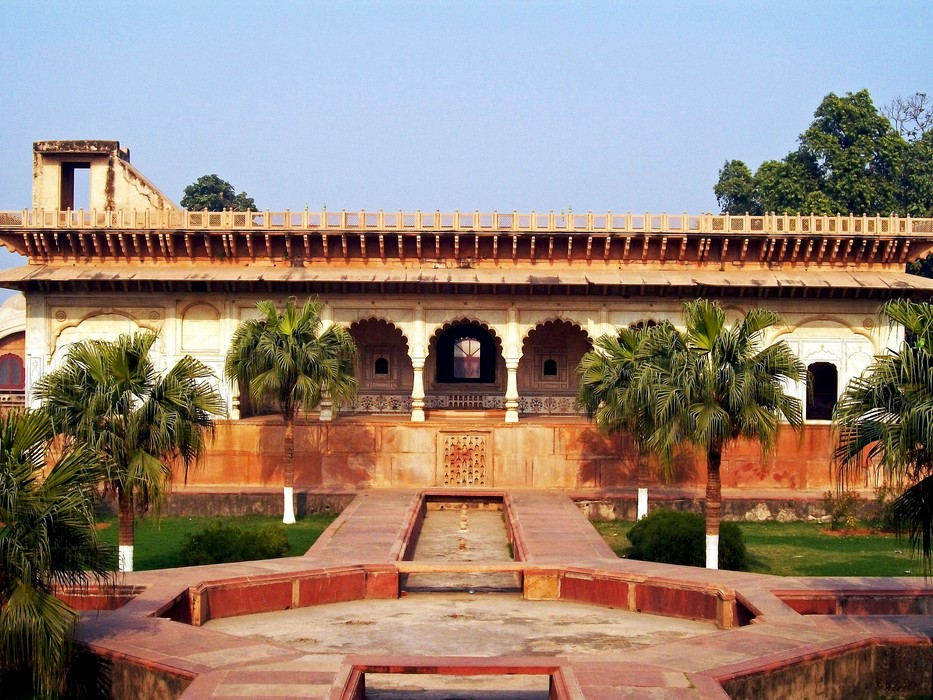
Suraj Bhawan

== See also ==
- Deeg
- Bharatpur, Rajasthan
