= Nahar Singh of Bharatpur =

Maharaja of Shekhawati

Maharaja Nahar Singh (26 December 1672 – 6 December 1697), as the first son of Veena Devi and Maharaja Suraj Singh the jat Maharaja of the princely state of Bharatpur (in Rajputana), he was chosen as the next successor by his father and proclaimed as the ruler of Bharatpur on 26 December 1672 at Jhunjhunu by General Balla Singh on receipt of news of Nahar Singh's father's death. But he was opposed by Maharani Veena and the chief nobles of the state. He later died in Sikar on 6 December 1697 by natural causes.

== See also ==
- List of princely states of British India (by region)
- List of princely states of British India (alphabetical)
