= Jawahar Singh =

Maharaja of Bharatpur from 1763 to 1768

- Maharaja Sawai of Bharatpur State; Bharatendra (Lord of the Bharatá); Prithvendra (The Lord of the World); Prince of Victories
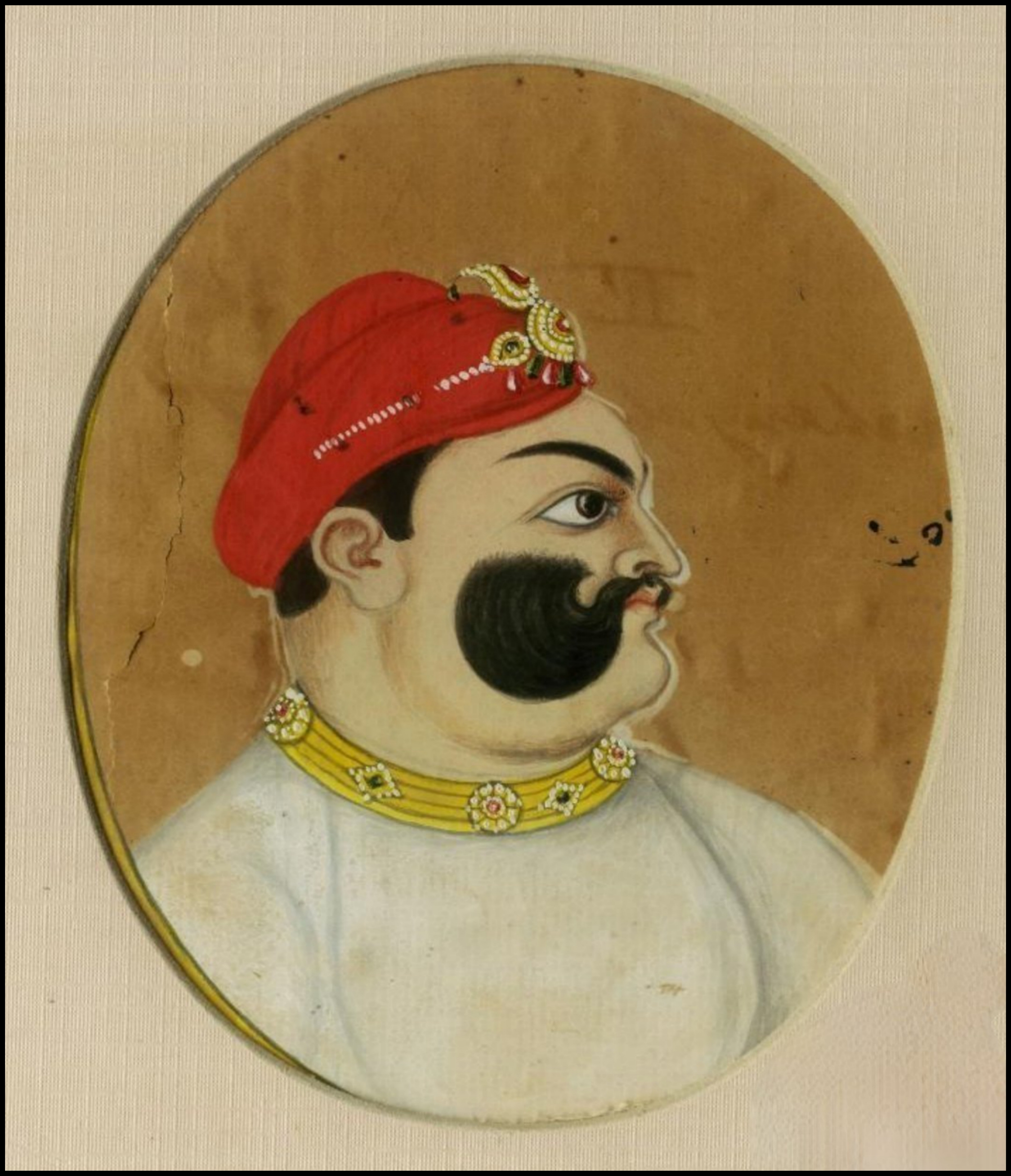
- Portrait of Maharaja Jawahar Singh

Maharaja of the Kingdom of Bharatpur
- Reign: 25 December 1763 – 27 August 1768
- Predecessor: Maharaja Suraj Mal
- Successor: Maharaja Ratan Singh
- Died: 27 August 1768; Agra Fort, Agra, Kingdom of Bharatpur
- House: Sinsiniwar Dynasty
- Father: Maharaja Suraj Mal
- Mother: Maharani Gauri
- Religion: Hinduism

Maharaja Jawahar Singh (r. 1763–1768) was the ruler and heir of the Bharatpur Kingdom. He succeeded to the throne when his father, Maharaja Surajmal, died in 1763.

== Early life ==
Jawahar Singh was born to Maharaja Surajmal and Maharani Gauri. He was later adopted by Maharani Kishori (from Sorout clan of Palwal). He was the 22nd direct descendant of Chaudhary Sobha Singh of Bayana, who founded Sinsini in 12th century by defeating native Kalals.

During Ahmed Shah Abdali's invasion of India in 1757, Abdali attacked Ballabhgarh.In a battle between the Durranis and Prince Jawahar Singh, he managed to captured 150 Durrani horses. Jawahar Singh had to return from the fort in the night as the defence of the fort was not possible in the face of heavy bombardments of Abdali's guns. After taking the city, Abdali sent his generals Jahan Khan and Najib Khan with 20,000 men to attack the territory and holy city of Mathura. According to historian Jadunath Sarkar, the Marathas fled from the north and not a single Maratha soldier fought for the holy city of Mathura which had the holiest of Vaishnav shrines, their "Hindupat-Padshahi" didn't involve any duty to protect it. But they were determined to defend this sacred city. Kunwar Jawahar Singh and Raja Shyam Singh Kuntal of Sonkh with 6,000 men blocked the path of the Afghans. They faced Afghans in Chaumuhan, in the fight that followed the cavalry charged the Afghan positions and almost seven to nine thousand men of Durranis were killed by Jat troops and Afghans subsequently carried out a general massacre in the unfortified city of Mathura. The people were looted, their property plundered and acts of iconoclasm followed.

The Great Mosque of Agra was changed into a market: The grain merchants had orders to expose their goods for sale there. The butchers shops were closed. They made very severe prohibition of the slaughter of oxen, cows and also of kids. All public profession of the Mohammedan religion was interdicted under very harsh treatment. One man gave the azaan but the government of Agra cut his tongue.

== Victory in Delhi ==
In 1764, Maharaj Jawahar Singh attacked Najib ad-Dawlah and Mughals and later bombarded and plundered Delhi. He enlisted the help of the Sikh Jatt chiefs for the campaign, but they retired early. The Rohilla Pathans and Mughals were sieged inside the fort and Delhi was captured on 9 January 1765 by Maharaja Jawahar Singh corroborated by contemporary Persian record (Delhi Chronicle by Naruddin): "News from Delhi- Najib-ud-daulah has been defeated by Jawahir Singh, and has retired into the fort . The city has fallen into the hands of Jawahir Singh. The city has fallen into the hands of Jawahir Singh. Najib-ud-daulah is desirous of going to his own country through the assistance of the Marathas."

Later peace negotiations were being carried out by Malhar Holkar. Maharaja Jawahar Singh realized that Holkar was double dealing with him and were in secret negotiation with Najib Khan. Jawahar Singh got the war expenses and he took the gates of Red fort with him to Bharatpur as the sign of victory.

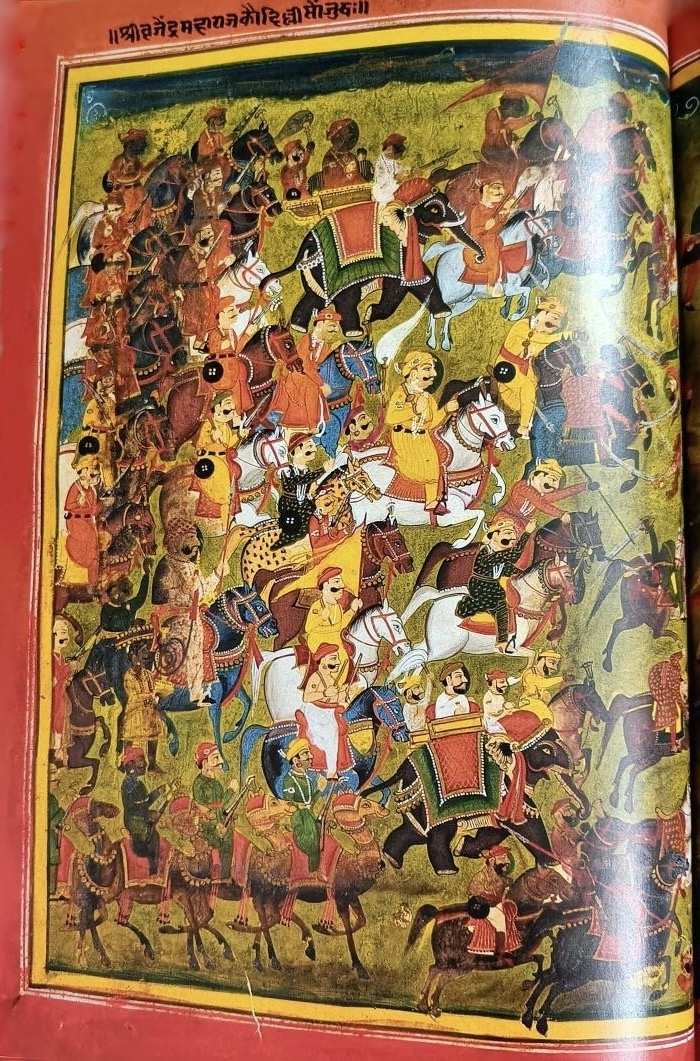
Maharaja Jawahar Singh in a battle

== War with Marathas ==
Maharaja Jawahar Singh was annoyed with the treacherous behavior of Malhar Rao Holkar during the Siege of Delhi as Holkar wanted to gain money from both sides (Jats and Rohilas), and sources also inform us that Holkar was secretly in-contact with Najib-ud-daula against Maharaja Jawahar Singh. Another reason to wage a war against Holkar was that Marathas and Holkar had tried to help his brother Raja Nahar Singh of Dholpur. This made Jawahar Singh to take actions against Marathas.

Both sides came in front of each other and a pitched battle was fought between the Sikh troops (hired by Jawahar Singh) and Marathas under Holkar on 13 and 14 March 1766 near Dholpur. In this battle Marathas was beaten back by Jat and Sikh troops. The fleeing Maratha forces of Holkar were chased by Jat troops. The city of Dholpur was taken by the Jats and many Maratha generals were captured, the Maratha army of 14,000 scattered and many of the troops were killed. Malhar Rao Holkar was thus defeated by Maharaja Jawahar Singh in Battle of Dholpur (1766).

== Bundelkhand Campaign ==
Maharaja Sawai Prithvendra Jawahar Singh Bahadur planned to expand his kingdom on the side of Bundelkhand and Northern Malwa.

Maharaja started his campaign in June 1767 by capturing Bhadarwar region from Bhadoria Rajput vassals of Marathas. The Jat army defeated the Maratha forces at Rampura and further moved to Ayaman fort, its Maratha chief became frightened by the Jat invasion. He fled from there and went to the shelter of Gaur Rajput chief of Indurkhi. The fortress was captured and the nearby area was plundered by Jats.

The enthusiasm of the young Maharaja increased greatly due to these victories. Therefore, during the days of heavy rains (July 11, 1767 AD), he attacked Bhind and Ater and captured them also by defeating Maratha army. Till now these states used to pay Khandani (state tax) to the Marathas. Now they would pay to Maharaja Jawahar Singh. Now he marched towards Samthar via Muravali to take over other areas with great speed, but at the same time he got the news that the people of Rampura had revolted, then the conquest of Samthar was postponed and the Jats headed towards Javar Paravara village. On July 13, 1767, Jats went towards Rampura. It was surrounded. After some time, the people of Rampur agreed to accept the sovereignty of the Jats.

Maharaja's army moved towards the Kalpi area, where its Maratha officer Balaji Govind Khair wanted to prevent disturbance and plunder. He sent Krishnaji-pant to Maharaja Jawahar with an offer of Rs. 3 lakhs, if he would spare Maratha territory in Bundelkhand. But the Jats did not concede to his offer. Maharaja took control of the march and attacked Balaji Govind. All Maratha chiefs fled, and Govind's with his children fled to Raipur (Jalaun). Govind maratha then crossed the Betwa river and took refugee. Maharaja now, moved further and established his dominance in Jalaun.

On August 14, 1767, Maharaja Jawahar Singh received a request from the Khichi Rajput chief of Raghogarh to help free his state from the Marathas. However, he rejected the request and returned to the north. He, then won the Maratha police station of Jigani by defeating Gobind Sabharam and joined the Jat kings of Gohad and Pichorre. These victories of Maharaja led to a problem for the Peshwa in Poona, who wanted to maintain Maratha power in the north. In September 1767, the Maratha officers on the orders of Peshwa made a treaty with Jawahar Singh. After this treaty, Maharaja gained Jigani and Jatalwar parganas of Vitthalrao Tavardhar and parganas of Sikarwar which belonged to Mahadaji Kasi. Thereafter. Maharaja crossed Chambal and returned to Bharatpur.

Thus, after taking the entire region of Kalpi- Jalaun under his control, Maharaja Jawahar Singh set out and reached Samthar from there. Gujjar chief of Samthar readily accepted the submission and promised to give him 20-25 thousand rupees to Maharaja Singh. Thereafter, around the first week of August, 1767 AD. he moved towards Narwar. Thus, in the words of a Maratha correspondent "every place in Kalpi province- Kachhavadhar. Bhadawar, Tanvardhar, Sikarwar, Dandroli, Khitoli and Shraddha areas was captured by the Jats (Jawahar Singh). And just Jhansi itself was the center of our (Marathas) and Gwalior have remained in reverence." However, the marathas recovered the bundelkhand region in January 1768.

== War with Kingdom of Jaipur ==
Jawahar Singh made the big mistake of leaving Pratap Singh of Machheri, the rebel noble of Jaipur, for the defence of Bharatpur. He had provided him shelter in his realms during the hour of crises in the latter's life and considered Partap Singh to be a reliable man. But his faith proved misplaced as the Rao Raja proved traitor. When Jawahar Singh was at Pushkar, he left Bharatpur and joined the camp of Madho Singh. Rather he instigated Madho Singh to take action against Jawahar Singh.

All the Rajput rulers assembled at Pushkar and held a conference in which no Jat rulers were invited. Raja Madho Singh said in this conference that the Jat ruler had injured the vanity of all the Rajputs. It was here that a witty Marwari, Raja Vijay Singh pointed out that after all the Jats were also Hindus and if they donated liberally on this auspicious occasion according to their financial position, it must not be taken as humiliation by Rajputs. Madho Singh, however, rejected this advice and appealed for war. The decision of this conference soon reached Jawahar Singh. He was expecting it.

Madho Singh laid on ambush in a valley to intercept Jawahar Singh on his return. Jawahar Singh had anticipated this and took the alternative route via Turnawati, which was a bottleneck Surrounded by hills. The column of troops with cavalry and artillery was marching under the leadership of Captain Samru.

All of a sudden Rajputs attacked them from three sides. It was a fierce battle.

It is said that 25,000 casualties occurred in this battle. Jawahar Singh reached Bharatpur. But apparently the loss did not have much of a repercussion on the strength of Jats. He was assassinated by one of his favourite soldiers (swallowing poison) in at Agra Fort, 27 August 1768.
