= Deeg =

- City
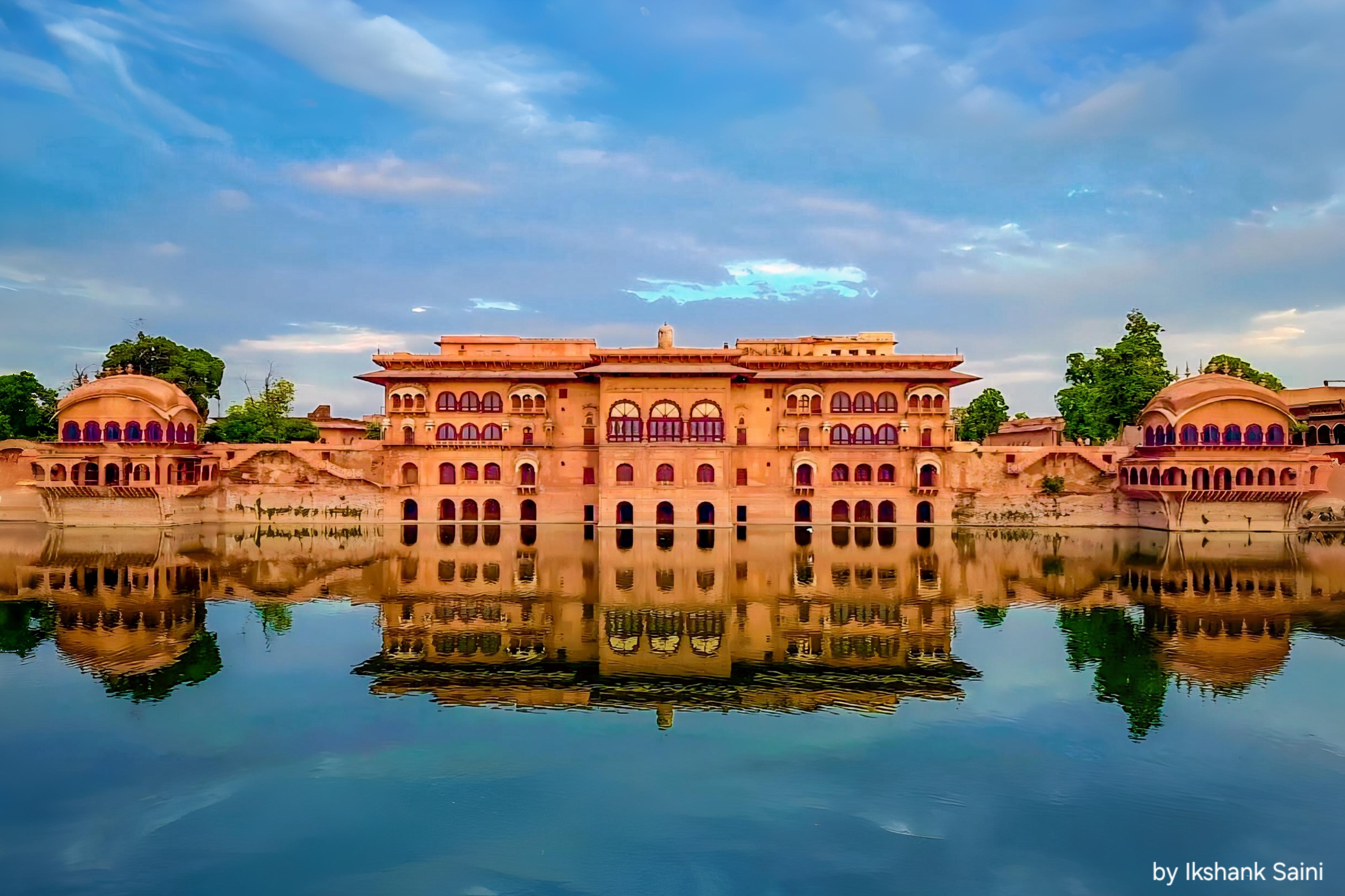
- Deeg Palace or Jal Mahal Deeg in Deeg, Rajasthan

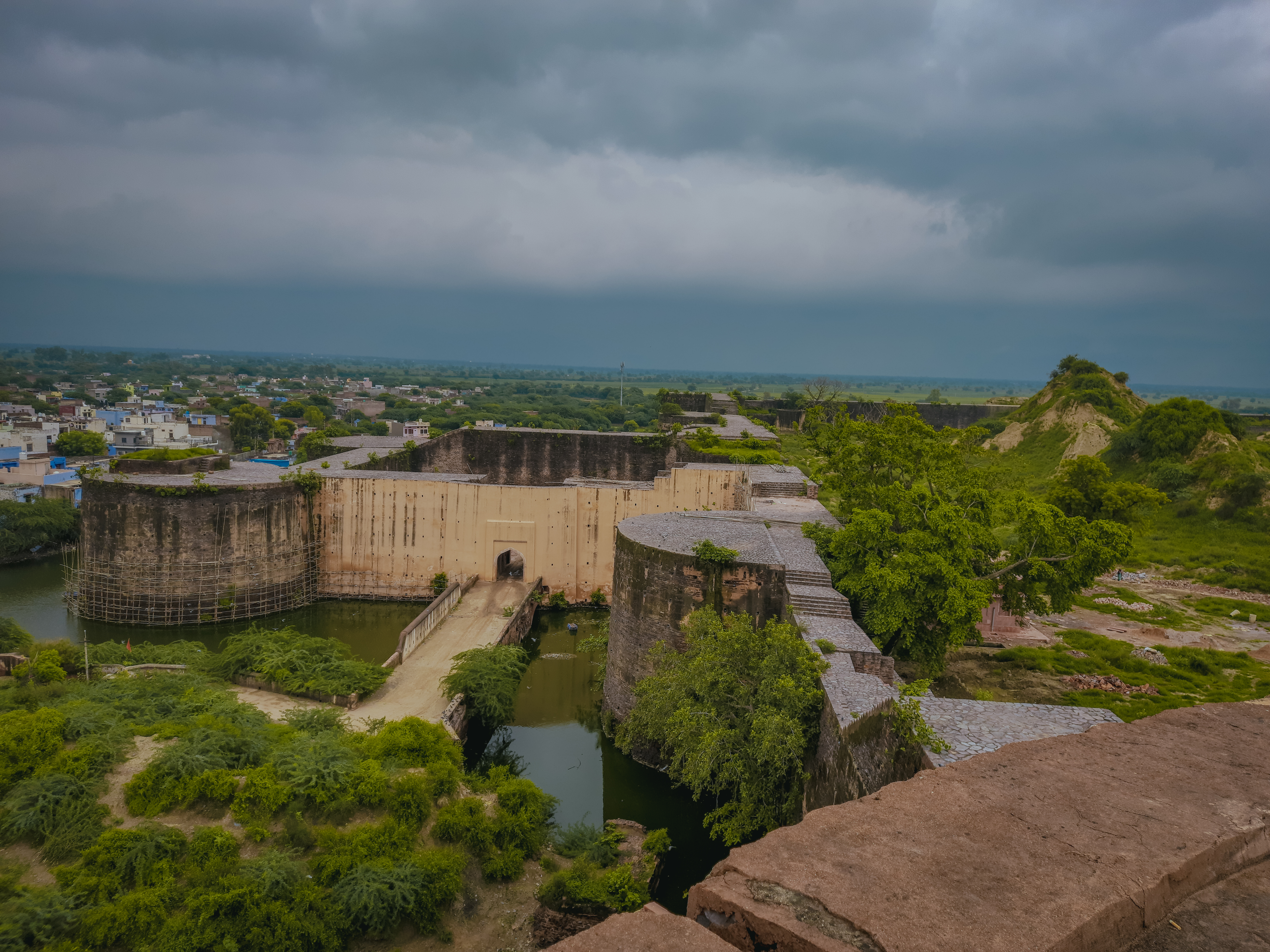
- Deeg Fort in Deeg, Rajasthan

- Location in Rajasthan, India
- Coordinates: 27.47°N 77.33°E
- Country: India
- State: Rajasthan
- District: Deeg
- Founder: Maharaja Badan Singh

Government
  - Type: Municipal Council
  - Body: Deeg Municipal Council
- Elevation: 174 m (571 ft)

Population (2011)
  - City: 44,999
  - Urban: 44,999
  - Rural: 181,711

Languages
  - Official: Hindi, Rajasthani, Braj Bhasa
- Time zone: UTC+5:30 (IST)
- Postal code: 321203
- Vehicle registration: RJ05
- Website: https://deeg.rajasthan.gov.in/home/dptHome

Deeg is a historical city in the Deeg district of the Indian state of eastern Rajasthan. It is renowned for its architectural heritage, including palaces, forts, gardens, and fountains. Historically, Deeg became the first capital of the Hindu Jats of Bharatpur. It played a significant role in the region's political and cultural development due to its proximity to Agra. Later, Maharaja Suraj Mal ordered the construction of multiple buildings and landmarks in Deeg, as well as the renovation of the Deeg Palace, the only Hindu-style palace in North India.

== Deeg in films ==
Some scenes of Noorjehan (1967) and Mughal-e-Azam were shot in the Deeg Palace. The same is true for Siddhartha (1972), an Indo-American drama mystery film based on the 1922 novel of the same name by Hermann Hesse. Siddhartha also has some scenes in Bharatpur's Keoladeo National Park.

== Geography ==
Deeg Palace is a palace in Deeg, 32 km from city of Bharatpur in the Deeg District in Rajasthan, India. It was built in 1772 as a luxurious summer resort for the Jat rulers of Bharatpur. The palace was in active use until the early 1970s. Deeg Palace is the only Hindu-style palace in North India.

Deeg is located at 27.47°N 77.33°E. It has an average elevation of 174 m (571 ft).

== History ==
After acquiring the throne, Jat ruler Maharaja Badan Singh chose Deeg as the place for his stronghold and capital. Hence, he initiated the construction of the Deeg Palace here. Being the capital of the Jat rulers and located at a distance of just about 32 km from Bharatpur, his palace served as a summer mansion for the royal family. He became the founder of the Jat House in Bharatpur and under his reign, Deeg gained immense prosperity and urbanisation. In fact, Maharaja Suraj Mal, son of Badan Singh, is often considered a role model for modern Jats. Owing to its great location, architectural beauty and grandeur, the palace caught the attention of many contemporary empires and states. Deeg was almost constantly under the threat of a Mughal invasion. Hence, in order to protect the Deeg Palace, Maharaja Suraj Mal ordered the construction of a fortress around the palace.

During 1804, both the Battle of Deeg and the Siege of Deeg brought the British East India Company into conflict with Bharatpur's Jat rulers and their Maratha allies for control of the area.

== Architecture ==
The palace complex together with its water gardens was a summer retreat for the Jat Maharajas of Bharatpur. The layout comprises several palaces called Bhawans, interwoven within a series of charbaghs and water gardens. The major Bhawans are Gopal Bhawan, Divan I Khas or the Kishan Bhawan, Wrestling Palace or Nand Bhawan, Keshav Bhawan, Hardev Bhawan, Suraj Bhawan and the symmetrically arranged twin pavilions of Sawan & Bhadon.

== Demographics ==
As of the 2011 Indian census, Deeg had a population of 44,999. Males constitute 54% of the population and females 46%. Deeg has an average literacy rate of 75.61%, higher than the national average of 74.04%: male literacy is 85.73% and, female literacy is 64.23%. In Deeg, 17% of the population is under 6 years of age.

== Attractions and festivals ==
- Deeg Palace with its 900 fountains, which operate twice a year during Braj Holi festival in February/ March and the Avamasaya festival in September. There is a Jawahar exhibition fair, named after Maharaja Jawahar Singh, held every year around September. The Deeg Palace museum is closed on Fridays.
- Deeg Festival is celebrated in the Deeg to celebrate Deeg sathapna Diwas memory. Several activities are celebrated, including shobhayatra, sports activities, dress competition, deepdan, colour fountain, cultural evening, mehndi rangoli.
- Deeg Fort is known for its security and force. The Deeg Fort was designed as a square and stands on a slightly elevated ground. Its walls are composed of rubble and mud and are strengthened with twelve imposing towers, the most impressive features of the Deeg Fort. The largest tower is known as Lakha-Burj (literal translation: 100,000 towers) and is located in the northwest corner. These towers were fixed with cannons to attack advancing enemies. The entire Deeg Fort is surrounded by a shallow wide moat, to which access is possible through a bridge on the northern side linked with the only gate. A partially ruined palace or Haveli is the principal building of Deeg Fort. Some parts of the palace have been re-constructed in the 20th century to appear like the original palace. The palace has a court covered by compartments. The use of red sandstones and pointed arch of the palace is remarkable. The other significant structures of the fort include certain underground chambers, the tomb of Muhammad Shafi, a Mughal Mir bakhshi.
