= List of dynasties and rulers of Rajasthan =

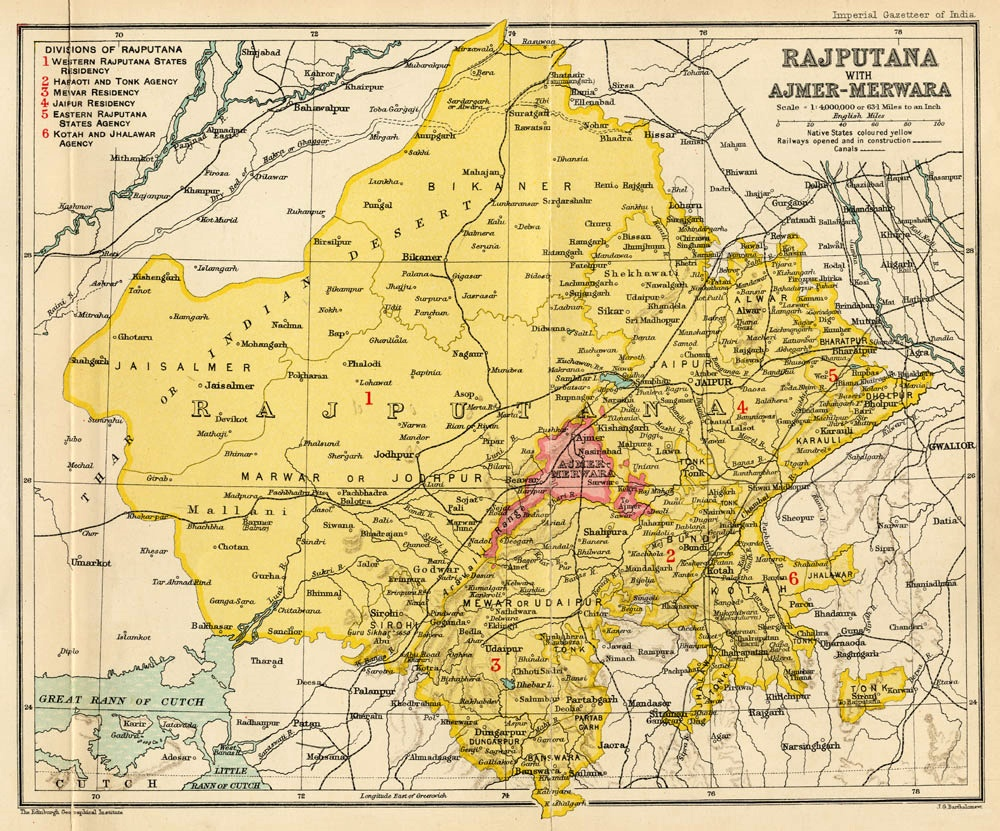
The map of the Rajputana Agency in 1909 from the Imperial Gazetteer. Legend: princely states are in yellow

Rajasthan is a state in northern India. The history of Rajasthan is about 5000 years old. The history of Rajasthan can be classified into three parts owing to the different epochs- Ancient, Medieval and Modern. Rajput clans emerged and held their sway over different parts of Rajasthan from about 700 CE.

Rajputana “land of the Rajputs” was Rajasthan's old name under the British Raj. When India became independent, 23 princely states were consolidated to form the state of Rajasthan, “Home of Rajas”.

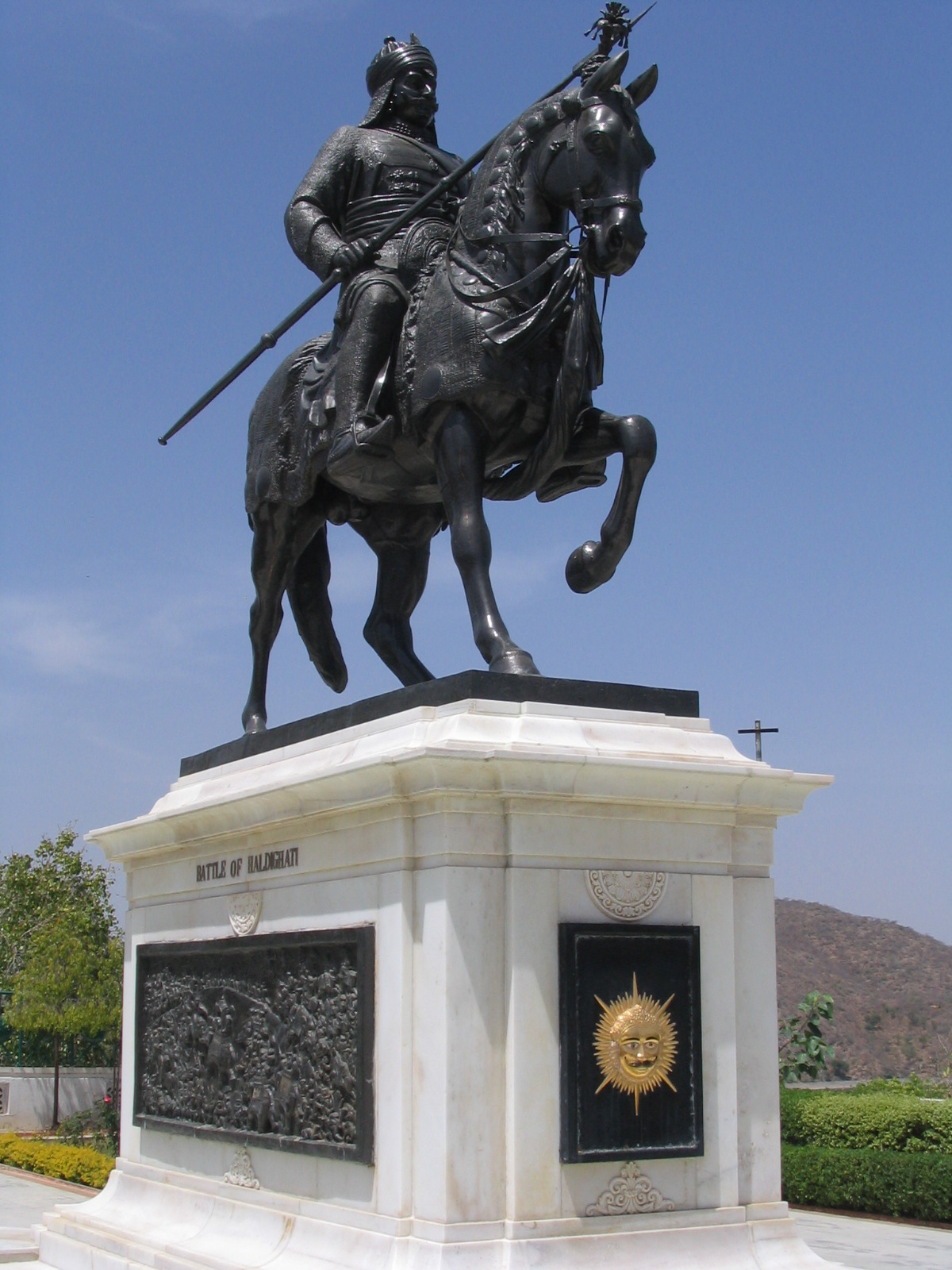
Statue of Maharana Pratap most celebrated ruler of Rajasthan from Sisodia Dynasty

Following is a list of dynasties and rulers, which ruled or origin from Rajasthan from Ancient period to Modern period:

== Pratihara dynasty (c. 550 – 1036 CE) ==
=== Pratiharas of Mandavyapura (Mandore) (c. 550 – 860 CE) ===
Rudolf Hoernlé assumed a period of 20 years for each generation, and placed the dynasty's founder Harichandra in c. 640 CE. Baij Nath Puri placed Harichandra in c. 600 CE. R. C. Majumdar, on the other hand, assumed a period of 25 years for each generation, and placed him in c. 550 CE. The following is a list of the dynasty's rulers (IAST names in brackets) and estimates of their reigns, assuming a period of 25 years:

- Harichandra (Haricandra) alias Rohilladhi (r. c. 550 CE)
- Rajilla (r. c. 575 CE)
- Narabhatta (Narabhaṭa) alias Pellapelli (r. c. 600 CE)
- Nagabhata (Nāgabhaṭa) alias Nahada (r. c. 625 CE)
- Tata (Tāta) and Bhoja (r. c. 650 CE)
- Yashovardhana (Yaśovardhana) (r. c. 675 CE)
- Chanduka (Canduka) (r. c. 700 CE)
- Shiluka (Śīluka) alias Silluka (r. c. 725 CE)
- Jhota (r. c. 750 CE)
- Bhilladitya alias Bhilluka (r. c. 775 CE)
- Kakka (r. c. 800 CE)
- Bauka (Bāuka) (r. c. 825 CE)
- Kakkuka (r. c. 861 CE)

Bauka and Kakkuka were sons of Kakka from different mothers. The Jodhpur and Ghantiyala inscriptions of the two step-brothers give same genealogy of the family, except the last two names. Since these two inscriptions were found not far from each other, it appears that Bauka succeeded Kakka (rather than the two dividing Kakka's kingdom).

=== Pratiharas of Bhinmala and Kannauj (c. 730 – 1036 CE) ===
List of Imperial Gurjara-Pratihara dynasty rulers
Serial No.	Ruler	Reign (CE)
1	Nagabhata I	730–760
2	Kakustha and Devaraja	760–780
3	Vatsaraja	780–800
4	Nagabhata II	800–833
5	Ramabhadra	833–836
6	Mihira Bhoja or Bhoja I	836–885
7	Mahendrapala I	885–910
8	Bhoja II	910–913
9	Mahipala I	913–944
10	Mahendrapala II	944–948
11	Devapala	948–954
12	Vinayakapala	954–955
13	Mahipala II	955–956
14	Vijayapala II	956–960
15	Rajapala	960–1018
16	Trilochanapala	1018–1027
17	Yasahpala	1024–1036

== Mewar dynasty (c. 566 – 1948 CE) ==
Guhila dynasty of Nagada-Ahar is one of the oldest dynasties of Mewar, they ruled in the 6th century and Sisodia Dynasty (1326–1947 CE) is one of the branch of Guhila dynasty.

=== Guhila dynasty (c. 566 – 1303 CE) ===
List of Guhila dynasty rulers
Serial No.	King (Rawal)	Reign (CE)	Notes
1	Rawal Guhil	566–586	
2	Rawal Bhoj	586–606	
3	Rawal Mahendra I	606–626	
4	Rawal Naga (Nagaditya)	626–646	
5	Rawal Shiladitya	646–661	
6	Rawal Aprajeet	661–688	
7	Rawal Mahendra II	688–716	
8	Bappa Rawal	728–753	
9	Rawal Khuman I	753–773	
10	Rawal Mattat	773–793	
11	Rawal Bhartri Bhatt I	793–813	
12	Rawal Sinh	813–828	
13	Rawal Khuman II	828–853	
14	Rawal Mahayak	853–878	
15	Rawal Khuman III	878–926	
16	Rawal Bhartri Bhatt II	926–951	
17	Rawal Allat	951–971	
18	Rawal Narwahan	971–973	
19	Rawal Saliwahan	973–977	
20	Rawal Shakti Kumar	977–993	
21	Rawal Amba Prasad	993–1007	
22	Rawal Shuchivarma	1007–1021	
23	Rawal Narvarma	1021–1035	
24	Rawal Keertivarma	1035–1051	
25	Rawal Yograj	1051–1068	
26	Rawal Vairath	1068–1088	
27	Rawal Hanspal	1088–1103	
28	Rawal Vair Singh	1103–1107	
29	Rawal Vijai Singh	1107–1116	
30	Rawal Ari Singh I	1116–1138	
31	Rawal Chaudh Singh	1138–1148	
32	Rawal Vikram Singh	1148–1158	
33	Rawal Rana Singh	1158–1168	
Post-split Rawal branch rulers
34	Rawal Khshem Singh(Karana)	1168–1172	
35	Rawal Samant Singh(Rahapa)	1172–1179	
36	Rawal Kumar Singh	1179–1191	
37	Rawal Mathan Singh	1191–1211	
38	Rawal Padam Singh	1211–1213	
39	Rawal Jaitra Singh	1213–1252	
40	Rawal Tej Singh	1252–1273	
41	Rawal Samar Singh	1273–1302	
42	Rawal Ratan Singh	1302–1303	

==== Branching of Guhil dynasty ====
During reign of Rawal Rana Singh (1158–1168), the Guhil dynasty got divided into two branches:

- First (Rawal Branch)

Rawal Khshem Singh (1168–1172), son of Ran Singh, ruled over Mewar by building Rawal Branch.

- Second (Rana Branch)

Rahapa, the second son of Ran Singh started the Rana Branch by establishing Sisoda bases. Later Hammir Singh of Sisoda base started main Sisodia or Mewar dynasty in 1326 CE.

==== Rana branch rulers (c. 1168 – 1326 CE) ====
"Rahapa", a son of Ranasimha, established the Rana branch. According to the 1652 Eklingji inscription, Rahapa's successors were:

List of Rana branch rulers
Nu.	King (Rana)	Reign (CE)	Notes
1	Rahapa/Karna	1168 CE	
2	Narapati		
3	Dinakara		
4	Jasakarna		
5	Nagapala		
6	Karnapala		
7	Bhuvanasimha		
8	Bhimasimha		
9	Jayasimha		
10	Lakhanasimha		
11	Arisimha		
12	Hammir Singh	1326 CE	

=== Sisodia dynasty (c. 1326 – 1947 CE) ===
Portrait	King (Maharana)	Reign	Notes
	Hammir Singh	1326–1364	He attacked Chittor in 1326 and re-took it from the Khiljis after the family lost it in 1303. Defeated Muhammad Bin Tughluq in Singoli taking the sultan himself a prisoner of war. Captured Ajmer, Ranthambor, Nagaur and Sopore.
	Kshetra Singh	1364–1382	Hammir's son, he captured Madalgarh and Bundi, completely annexed Ajmer. He also defeated Amin Shah of Malwa at the "Battle of Bakrole" and inflicted heavy casualties. His death can actually by as late as 1405.
	Lakha Singh	1382–1421	Khsetra's son, he was defeated multiple battles by Zafar Khan of Gujrat, but the territories were recovered. He rebuilt temples and shrines destroyed by Allaudin Khilji.
	Mokal Singh	1421–1433	Lakha's son, he defeated the Sultan of Nagaur and Gujrat. Later the sultan of Gujrat invaded Mewar and during this invasion. He was assassinated by his uncles Chacha and Mera.
	Rana Kumbha	1433–1468	Mokal's son, he first attacked and killed his fathers assassins. Defeated the Sultans of Nagaur, Gujarat and Malwa. Mewar became the strongest kingdom in North India. Built multiple strong forts in Mewar.
	Udai Singh I	1468–1473	Kumbha' son, he assassinated his father and was then defeated by his brother.
	Rana Raimal	1473–1508	Son of Kumbha, he killed his brother for assassinating his father. Fought against Malwa sultanate.
	Rana Sanga	1508–1527	Raimal's son, defeated the Sultan of Gujrat, Malwa and Delhi. Under his rule Mewar reached its pinnacle in power and prosperity. Eventually defeated by Babur.
	Ratan Singh II	1528–1531	Sanga's son, defeated and killed by Bahadur Shah of Gujarat.
	Vikramaditya Singh	1531–1536	Sanga's son, assassinated by his cousin Vanvir Singh.
	Vanvir Singh	1536–1540	Usurper of the throne. Defeated and expelled by his cousin Udai Singh II.
	Udai Singh II	1540–1572	Sanga's son, defeated Vanvir. Fought against Mughals and was defeated in Siege of Chittorgarh.
	Maharana Pratap	1572–1597	Udai's son, notable for his military resistance against the Mughals.
	Amar Singh I	1597–1620	Pratap's son, notable for his struggle against Mughals.
	Karan Singh II	1620–1628	Amar's son, maintained good relations with Mughals, built many temples, forts and strengthened existing ones.
	Jagat Singh I	1628–1652	Karan's son, attempted to restore fort of Chittor but Shah Jahan blocked his attempt.
	Raj Singh I	1652–1680	Jagat's son, fought and defeated Mughals many times. Regained territory and increased the wealth of the kingdom. Fought against Aurangzeb. Eventually poisoned by Aurangzeb's loyalists.
	Jai Singh	1680–1698	Raj's son, struggled to regain captured parts of Mewar from Mughals.
	Amar Singh II	1698–1710	Jai's son, invaded neighboring territories, formed an alliance against the Mughals with Jaipur and Marwar. Capitalized over a weak Mughal empire.
	Sangram Singh II	1710–1734	Amar's son, defeated Ranabaaz Khan at the Battle of Bandanwara. Reestablished relations with a weak Mughal emperor.
	Jagat Singh II	1734–1751	Sangram's son, started paying Chauth to the Marathas. Heavily invested in placing Sawai Madho Singh on the throne of Jaipur, eventually bankrupting Mewar.
	Pratap Singh II	1751–1754	Jagat's son.
	Raj Singh II	1754–1762	Pratap's son, paid heavy tribute to Maratha's, financially devastating Mewar.
	Ari Singh II	1762–1772	Raj's son, under him, Maratha's raided Mewar multiple times for not paying tribute.
	Hamir Singh II	1772–1778	Ari's son, underaged when became Rana and died.
	Bhim Singh	1778–1828	Hamir's brother, under him Mewar was repeatedly raided by Pindaris, Marwar and Jaipur fought for his daughter Krishna Kumari. Accepted sub ordinance of East India Company.
	Jawan Singh	1828–1838	Bhim's son, abused alcohol, not interested in ruling Mewar. Mewar racked up a lot of debt under his rule.
	Sardar Singh	1838–1842	Jawan's son
	Swarup Singh	1842–1861	Ruler during the Indian Rebellion of 1857.
	Shambhu Singh	1861–1874	Focused on reform of education and social reforms.
	Sajjan Singh	1874–1884	Shambhu's ruler.
	Fateh Singh	1884–1930	Sajjan's son
	Bhupal Singh	1930–1948 1948–1955 (titular)	Signed the Instrument of Accession to India, dissolving his kingdom into the India. Titular ruler from 1955
	Titular Maharanas		
	Bhagwat Singh	1955–1984	Lost the Privy Purse.
	Mahendra Singh	1984–2024	Bhagwat's elder son
	Vishvaraj Singh	2024–present	Present ruler

== Chauhan dynasty (c. 551 – 1315 CE) ==
Chauhans originally known as Chahamanas is the Rajput dynasty. The earliest Chauhan dynasty was Chahamanas of Shakambhari that ruled territory known as Sambhar.

The ruling dynasties belonging to the Chauhan clan included

- Chahamanas of Shakambhari (Chauhans of Ajmer) (c. 551 – 1194 CE)
- Chahamanas of Naddula (Chauhans of Nadol) (c. 950 – 1197 CE)
- Chahamanas of Jalor (c. 1160 – 1311 CE), branched off from the Chahamanas of Naddula
- Chahamanas of Ranastambhapura (c. 1192 – 1301 CE), branched off from the Chahamanas of Shakambhari
- Chahamanas of Chandravati and Abu (Kingdom of Sirohi) (c. 1311 – 1949 CE)
- Chahamanas of Lata
- Chahamanas of Dholpur
- Chahamanas of Partabgarh
- Hada Chauhan kingdoms of Hadoti region are–
  - Kingdom of Bundi (c. 1342 – 1949 CE)
  - Kingdom of Kota (c. 1579 – 1948 CE)
  - Kingdom of Jhalawar (c. 1838 – 1949 CE), branched off from the Kingdom of Kota in 1838 CE.

=== Chahamanas of Sambhar, Ajmer and Delhi (c. 551 – 1194 CE) ===
Following is a list of Chahamana rulers of Shakambhari, Ajmer and Delhi with approximate period of reign, as estimated historian by R. B. Singh:

Serial no.	Regnal names	Reign (CE)	Notes
1	King Chahamana	(Unknown)	Ancient founder of Chahamana clan.
2	Vasu-deva	c. 551 CE (disputed)	First known ruler of the dynasty. He ruled the Sapadalaksha region and made Shakambhari (modern Sambhar) as capital.
3	Samanta-raja	684–709	Identified as the ancient King Manik Rai by R. B. Singh.
4	Nara-deva	709–721	Naradeva was succeeded by his brother Ajayaraja I.
5	Ajaya-raja I	721–734	According to Prithviraja Vijaya, he was a great warrior who defeated several enemies.
6	Vigraha-raja I	734–759	He achieved military successes upon neighbouring kingdom.
7	Chandra-raja I	759–771	Chandraraja I was a son of the Chahamana king Vigraharaja I. He was succeeded by his brother Gopendraraja.
8	Gopendra-raja	771–784	The Prabandha-Kosha states that Gopendra defeated Arab invader Muhammad bin Qasim in a battle.
9	Durlabha-raja I	784–809	He achieved military success against the Pala Empire king Dharmapala as a vassal of the Pratihara emperor Vatsaraja.
10	Govinda-raja I alias Guvaka I	809–836	The Harsha stone inscription suggests that he was a vassal the Pratihara emperor Nagabhata II.
11	Chandra-raja II	836–863	He was succeeded by his son Govindaraja II.
12	Govindaraja II alias Guvaka II	863–890	The Harsha stone inscription describes Govinda II as a warrior. He married his sister to Pratihara emperor Mihira Bhoja.
13	Chandana-raja	890–917	According to the Harsha stone inscription, Chandana defeated a Tomara ruler named Rudra (Chandrapala).
14	Vakpati-raja	917–944	His younger son established the Naddula Chahamana branch in 950 CE.
15	Simha-raja	944–971	He was the first independent ruler of dynasty. He had assume the title of Maharajadhiraja.
16	Vigraha-raja II	971–998	He joined an alliance formed by the ruler of Lahore against the Ghaznavid ruler Sabuktigin.
17	Durlabha-raja II	998–1012	He assumed the title Maharajadhiraja. He joined a confederacy of Hindu kings to support Anandapala in Battle of Chach against invasion Mahmud of Ghazni in 1008 CE.
18	Govinda-raja III	1012–1026	The Prabandha Kosha states that he defeated Mahmud of Ghazni badly.
19	Vakpati-raja II	1026–1040	Later texts claimed that he defeated Bhoja, the Paramara king of Malwa.
20	Viryarama	1040 (few months)	Paramara king Bhoja attacked Chahamana kingdom and defeated him.
21	Chamunda-raja	1040–1065	He have defeated a Muslim army led by a Ghaznavid Sultan or general.
22	Durlabha-raja III alias Duśala	1065–1070	He conquered military successes upon neighbouring kingdom.
23	Vigraha-raja III alias Visala	1070–1090	He defeated Shahab-ud-Din (general of Ibrahim of Ghazna).
24	Prithvi-raja I	1090–1110	After defeating Muslim invaders he adopted titles as Parama-bhattaraka Maharajadhiraja Parameshvara.
25	Ajaya-raja II	1110–1135	He founded the city of Ajmer and moved his capital there.
26	Arno-raja alias Ana	1135–1150	His title as Maharajadhiraja-Parameshvara.
27	Jagad-deva	1150	Some sources claimed that he ascended Chahamana throne after killing his father.
28	Vigraha-raja IV alias Visaladeva	1150–1164	The Chahaman kingdom reached its zenith under him.
29	Apara-gangeya	1164–1165	He have ascended the throne as a minor, and ruled for a very short period.
30	Prithvi-raja II	1165–1169	He probably died heirless, so he was succeeded by his uncle Someshvara.
31	Someshvara	1169–1178	He adopted title of Pratāpalaṃkeśvara.
32	Prithviraja III Rai Pithora	1177–1192	Last effective ruler of the dynasty who was defeated in the Second Battle of Tarain against Muhammad of Ghor in 1192 CE.
33	Govinda-raja IV	1192	Ghurid vassal who later established the Chahamana branch of Ranastambhapura in 1192 CE.
34	Hari-raja	1193–1194	Last ruler of Chauhan dynasty branch of Ajmer.

=== Chahamanas of Naddula (c. 950 – 1197 CE) ===
Following is a list of Chahmana rulers of Naddula, with approximate period of reign, as estimated by R. B. Singh:

List of Chauhan rulers of Naddula
Serial no.	Kings	Reign (CE)
1	Lakshmana	950–982
2	Shobhita	982–986
3	Baliraja	986–990
4	Vigrahapala	990–994
5	Mahindra	994–1015
6	Ashvapala	1015–1019
7	Ahila	1019–1024
8	Anahilla	1024–1055
9	Balaprasada	1055–1070
10	Jendraraja	1070–1080
11	Prithvipala	1080–1090
12	Jojalladeva	1090–1110
13	Asharaja	1110–1119
14	Ratnapala	1119–1132
15	Rayapala	1132–1145
16	Katukaraja	1145–1148
17	Alhanadeva	1148–1163
18	Kelhanadeva	1163–1193
19	Jayatasimha	1193–1197

=== Chahamanas of Jalor (c. 1160 – 1311 CE) ===
The Chahamana rulers of the Jalor branch, with their estimated periods of reign, are as follows:

Virama-deva (1311 CE) was last ruler of dynasty, crowned during the Siege of Jalore, but died 2 1/2 days later.

List of Chauhan rulers of Jalor
Serial no.	Kings	Reign (CE)
1	Kirti-pala	1160–1182
2	Samara-simha	1182–1204
3	Udaya-simha	1204–1257
4	Chachiga-deva	1257–1282
5	Samanta-simha	1282–1305
6	Kanhada-deva	1292–1311
7	Virama-deva	1311

=== Chahamanas of Ranastambhapura (c. 1192 – 1301 CE) ===
List of Chauhan rulers of Ranastambhapura
Serial no.	Kings	Reign (CE)
1	Govinda-raja	1192
2	Balhana-deva	
3	Prahlada-deva	
4	Viranarayana	
5	Vagabhata	
6	Jaitra-simha	
7	Shakti-deva	
8	Hammira-deva	1283–1311

== Kachwaha dynasty (c. 966 – 1949 CE) ==
Kachwahas king Sorha Dev and Dulha Rao defeated Meena of Dhundhar kingdom between 950 and 966 CE and established Kingdom of Amber.

List of Kachwaha rulers of Dhoondar

- 27 Dec 966 – 15 Dec 1006 Sorha Dev (d. 1006)
- 15 Dec 1006 – 28 Nov 1036 Dulha Rao (d. 1036)
- 28 Nov 1036 – 20 Apr 1039 Kakil (d. 1039)
- 21 Apr 1039 – 28 Oct 1053 Hanu (d. 1053)
- 28 Oct 1053 – 21 Mar 1070 Janddeo (d. 1070)
- 22 Mar 1070 – 20 May 1094 Pajjun Rai (d. 1094)
- 20 May 1094 – 15 Feb 1146 Malayasi (d. 1146)
- 15 Feb 1146 – 25 Jul 1179 Vijaldeo (d. 1179)
- 25 Jul 1179 – 16 Dec 1216 Rajdeo (d. 1216)
- 16 Dec 1216 – 18 Oct 1276 Kilhan (d. 1276)
- 18 Oct 1276 – 23 Jan 1317 Kuntal (d. 1317)
- 23 Jan 1317 – 6 Nov 1366 Jonsi (d. 1366)
- 6 Nov 1366 – 11 Feb 1388 Udaikarn (d. 1388)
- 11 Feb 1388 – 16 Aug 1428 Narsingh (d. 1428)
- 16 Aug 1428 – 20 Sep 1439 Banbir (d. 1439)
- 20 Sep 1439 – 10 Dec 1467 Udharn (d. 1467)
- 10 Dec 1467 – 17 Jan 1503 Chandrasen (d. 1503)
- 17 Jan 1503 – 4 Nov 1527 Prithviraj Singh I (d. 1527)
- 5 Nov 1527 – 19 Jan 1534 Puranmal (d. 1534)
- 19 Jan 1534 – 22 Jul 1537 Bhim Singh (d. 1537)
- 22 Jul 1537 – 15 May 1548 Ratan Singh (d. 1548)
- 15 May 1548 – 1 June 1548 Askaran (d. 1599)
- 1 Jun 1548 – 27 Jan 1574 Bharmal (d. 1574)
- 27 Jan 1574 – 4 Dec 1589 Bhagwant Das (b. 1527 – d. 1589)
- 4 Dec 1589 – 6 Jul 1614 Man Singh (b. 1550 – d. 1614)
- 6 Jul 1614 – 13 Dec 1621 Bhau Singh (d. 1621)
- 13 Dec 1621 – 28 Aug 1667 Jai Singh I (b. 1611 – d. 1667)
- 10 Sep 1667 – 30 Apr 1688: Ram Singh I (b. 1640 – d. 1688)
- 30 Apr 1688 – 19 Dec 1699: Bishan Singh (b. 1672 – d. 1699)
- 19 Dec 1699 – 21 Sep 1743: Jai Singh II (b. 1688 – d. 1743)
- 1743 – 12 Dec 1750: Ishwari Singh (b. 1721 – d. 1750)
- Dec 1750 – 6 Mar 1768: Madho Singh I (b. 1728 – d. 1768)
- 7 Mar 1768 – 16 Apr 1778: Prithvi Singh II
- 1778 – 1803: Pratap Singh (b. 1764 – d. 1803)
- 1803 – 21 Nov 1818: Jagat Singh II (b. ... – d. 1818)
- 22 Dec 1818 – 25 Apr 1819: Mohan Singh (regent) (b. 1809 – d. ...)
- 25 Apr 1819 – 6 Feb 1835: Jai Singh III (b. 1819 – d. 1835)
- Feb 1835 – 18 Sep 1880: Ram Singh II (b. 1835 – d. 1880)
- 18 Sep 1880 – 7 Sep 1922: Madho Singh II (b. 1861 – d. 1922)
- 7 Sep 1922 – 15 Aug 1947 (subsidiary): Sawai Man Singh II (b. 1912 – d. 1970)
- 15 Aug 1947 – 7 Apr 1949 (independent): Sawai Man Singh II (b. 1912 – d. 1970)

He was the last ruler of Kachawa dynasty, he annexed Jaipur State with Union of India in 1949 CE.

Titular rulers

- 7 Apr 1949 – 24 Jun 1970: Sawai Man Singh II
- 24 Jun 1970 – 28 Dec 1971: Sawai Bhawani Singh (b. 1931 – d. 2011)

Titles were abolished in 1971 according to the 26th amendment to the Indian Constitution.

- 28 Dec 1971 – 17 Apr 2011: Sawai Bhawani Singh (b. 1931 – d. 2011)
- 17 Apr 2011 – present: Padmanabh Singh (b. 1998)

== Bhati dynasty (c. 600 – 1949 CE) ==
Bhati dynasty ruled present Jaisalmer from 600s CE.

Early rulers

- Jaisimha, while the genealogy of the Bhatti Rajputs is known, it does seem to be approximate, and is poorly dated. Only a few names stand out and can be linked to historical events, and not reliably so until the 12th century.
- Bahubal
- Subahu
- Rajh
- Gaj
- Salivahan
- Baland
- Bhati
- Mangal Rao
- Majam Rao
- Kehar / Ehar I (773–806)
- Tano (806–821)
- Bijairai I (821–853)
- Deoraj / Devraj (853–908)
- Mund / Mundh (908–979)
- Bachharajat / Bijairaj II (979–1044)
- Dusaj (1044–1124)
- Lanja
- Bhojdev / Bhojdeo

Rawals

- Rawal Jaisal Singh (1153–1168), official founder of kingdom, early Bhatti capital at Lodorva (Ludarva) is ransacked and laid waste Muhammad of Ghor. Nevertheless, he and Jaisal patch up their differences and Jaisal goes on to kill his own brother and nephew in battle with the help of Muhammad Ghor A new capital is established when Jaisal founds the city of Jaisalmer.
- Rawal Shalivahan Singh II (1168–1200)
- Rawal Baijal Singh (1200–1200)
- Rawal Kailan Singh (1200–1219)
- Rawal Chachak Deo Singh (1219–1241)
- Rawal Karan Singh I (1241–1271)
- Rawal Lakhan Sen (1271–1275)
- Rawal Punpal Singh (1275–1276)
- Rawal Jaitsi Singh I Rawal Jethsi (1276–1294), the Bhati Rajput leader Jethsi faces an eight-year siege by Sultan Aladin Khilji of Delhi. Tradition has it that when the Bhatti Rajputs are sure of their impending defeat, they kill their womenfolk, with some committing 'Jauhar' by jumping into the fire lest they be defiled by the enemy. The males, the warriors, march from the fort, heading straight for their enemy and a final massacre. Eventually some surviving Bhattis reoccupy the fort.
- Rawal Mulraj Singh I (1294–1295)
- Rawal Durjan Sal (Duda) (1295–1306), The second Jauhar takes place under similar circumstances, this time against Sultan Ferozshah of Delhi.
- Rawal Gharsi Singh (1306–1335)
- Rawal Kehar Singh II (1335–1402)
- Rawal Lachhman Singh (1402–1436)
- Rawal Bersi Singh (1436–1448)
- Rawal Chachak Deo Singh II (1448–1457)
- Rawal Devidas Singh (1457–1497)
- Rawal Jaitsi Singh II (1497–1530)
- Rawal Karan Singh II (1530–1530)
- Rawal Lunkaran Singh (1530–1551), the third Jauhar takes place when a local Afghan chief by the name of Amir Ali attacks Jaisalmer, one of many Afghans settled in north-western India. This time around the army of Jaisalmer is victorious in its defence. Lunakaran also fights Moghul emperor, Humayun as the emperor passes through on his way to Ajmer.
- Rawal Maldev Singh (1551–1562)
- Rawal Harraj Singh (1562–1578), the Moghul king Akbar gains the submission of Jaisalmer, along with the other Rajputs of Bikaner, Bundi, and Jodhpur
- Rawal Bhim Singh (1578–1624), Bhim Singh forms a matrimonial alliance with the Moghuls when he marries his daughter to Raja Raj Singh of Bikaner. The raja's own daughter is married to Prince Salim, son of Akbar (later to be the Emperor Jehangir).
- Rawal Kalyan Singh (1624–1634)
- Rawal Manohar Das Singh (1634–1648)
- Rawal Ram-Chandra Singh (1648–1651)
- Rawal Sabal Singh (1651–1661), Sahal Singh assists Moghul Emperor Shah Jahan in his Peshawar campaign. He also extends his kingdom and comes into conflict with the Bikaner Rathors.

Maharawals

- Maharawal Amar Singh of Jaisalmer (1661–1702)
- Maharawal Jaswant Singh of Jaisalmer (1702–1708)
- Maharawal Budh Singh (1708–1722)
- Maharawal Akhi Singh (1722–1762)
- Maharawal Mulraj II (1762–1820), attacks by the Jodhpur Rathors begin during the reign of Mulraj Singh II. Mulraj Singh signs a treaty with the British for protection.
- Maharawal Gaj Singh (1820–1846)
- Maharawal Ranjit Singh of Jaisalmer (1846–1864)
- Maharawal Bairi Sal (1864–1891)
- Maharawal Shalivahan Singh III (1891 –1914)
- Maharawal Jawahir Singh (1914–1947)
- Girdhar Singh (1949–1950), last ruler of kingdom merge state with Rajasthan Union in 1949.

Titular kings

- Raghunath Singh (1950–1982)
- Brijraj Singh (1982–2020)
- Chaitanya Raj Singh (2020–present)

== Jadaun dynasty (c. – 1947 CE) ==
Jadaun dynasty ruled over Karauli.

== Rathore dynasty of Marwar (c. 1226 – 1950 CE) ==
=== Rathore rulers of Pali and Mandore (c. 1226 – 1438 CE) ===
Rulers-

Name		Notes	Reign began	Reign ended
1	Rao Siha	He conquered Pali and became the first rao of the Rathore dynasty in Marwar. He died in the battle of Lakha Jhawar (1273) against Sultan Ghaus ud-din Balban.	1226	1273
2	Rao Asthan	Conquered Kher from the Gohils and Idar from the Bhils. He died in battle against Jalaludin Khilji.	1273	1292
3	Rao Doohad	He conquered more than 140 villages. He was killed in battle against the Parihars.	1292	1309
4	Rao Raipal	He avenged his father by killing the ruler of the Parihars. During a famine in Marwar he distributed his own personal grains to the people.	1309	1313
5	Rao Kanhapal	He suffered raids from the Turko-Afgan tribes and was killed in action defending his lands.	1313	1323
6	Rao Jalansi	He defeated the Sodhas. He took the turban of the Sodha chief to mark his supremacy in the region.	1323	1328
7	Rao Chado		1328	1344
8	Rao Tida	He was killed in battle against the sultan of Delhi.	1344	1357
9	Rao Kanha Dev		1357	1374
10	Rao Viram Dev	He died in battle against the Johiyas.	1374	1383
11	Rao Chandra	He conquered Mandore from the Turks in 1406. He further conquered the areas of Nagaur, Sambhar, Khatu, Nadol and Ajmer. He was killed in battle against Salim Shah of Multhan.	1383	1424
12	Rao Kanha	Fought battles with his brothers. Died young in Mandore.	1424	1427
13	Rao Ranmal	He consolidated his rule with the help of the Sisodias of Mewar. He was later assassinated on the orders of Rana Kumbha.	1427	1438

=== Rathore rulers of Jodhpur (c. 1459 – 1950 CE) ===
Rulers-

Name		Notes	Reign began	Reign ended					
1	Rao Jodha	Fought Rana Kumbha and reclaimed his lands. He later founded the city of Jodhpur and made it his capital. He subjugated the states of Jalore and Bundi and annexed Ajmer, Sambhar and Mohilavati.	12 May 1438	6 April 1489	2	Rao Satal	Died from wounds after saving 140 women from Afghan raiders.	6 April 1489	March 1492
3	Rao Suja		March 1492	2 October 1515					
4	Rao Biram Singh	Son of Bagha	2 October 1515	8 November 1515					
5	Rao Ganga	Assisted Rana Sanga in his campaigns against the Sultans of India.	8 November 1515	9 May 1532					
6	Rao Maldeo	Successfully repelled the invasions of Sher Shah Suri. Called as one of the most potent rulers of Hindustan by Ferishta.	9 May 1532	7 November 1562					
7	Rao Chandra Sen	He defended his kingdom for nearly two decades against relentless attacks from the Mughal Empire.	7 November 1562	1581					
8	Raja Udai Singh Mota Raja	He was the father in law of Jahangir and got married his daughter Mani Bai married to him, later on who became parents of Shah Jahan	4 August 1583	11 July 1595					
9	Sawai Raja Suraj-Mal		11 July 1595	7 September 1619					
10	Maharaja Gaj Singh I	The first to take the title Maharaja by himself	7 September 1619	6 May 1638					
11	Maharaja Jaswant Singh	He fought Aurangzeb in the Battle of Dharmatpur.	6 May 1638	28 December 1678					
12	Maharaja Ajit Singh	Became Maharaja of Marwar after 25 years of war with Aurangzeb. Durgadas Rathore played a key role in the war.	19 February 1679	24 June 1724					
13	Raja Indra Singh	Installed in opposition to Maharaja Ajit Singh by Emperor Aurangzeb but unpopular with people of Marwar	9 June 1679	4 August 1679					
14	Maharaja Abhai Singh	Defeated Sarbuland Khan and occupied all of Gujarat for a short time.	24 June 1724	18 June 1749					
15	Maharaja Ram Singh	First reign	18 June 1749	July 1751					
16	Maharaja Bakht Singh	He was the general of the Marwari forces against Sarbuland Khan and defeated him. In the Battle of Gangwana he defeated a combined army of Mughals and Kachwahas.	July 1751	21 September 1752					
17	Maharaja Vijay Singh	First reign	21 September 1752	31 January 1753					
18	Maharaja Ram Singh	Second reign	31 January 1753	September 1772					
19	Maharaja Vijay Singh	Second reign – Was defeated by Mahadji Scindia and forced to surrender the fort and city of Ajmer.	September 1772	17 July 1793					
20	Maharaja Bhim Singh		17 July 1793	19 October 1803					
21	Maharaja Man Singh	Entered into treaty relations with the British on 6 January 1818.	19 October 1803	4 September 1843					
22	Maharaja Sir Takht Singh	Not in the direct line, but a great-great-great-grandson of Ajit Singh. Formerly Regent of Ahmednagar.	4 September 1843	13 February 1873					
23	Maharaja Sir Jaswant Singh II	Kaisar-i-Hind	13 February 1873	11 October 1895					
24	Maharaja Sir Sardar Singh	Colonel in the British Indian Army	11 October 1895	20 March 1911					
25	Maharaja Sir Sumair Singh	Colonel in the British Indian Army	20 March 1911	3 October 1918					
26	Maharaja Sir Umaid Singh	Lieutenant-General in the British Indian Army	3 October 1918	9 June 1947					
27	Maharaja Sir Hanwant Singh	Ruler of Marwar (Jodhpur) until accession to the Union of India in 1949; died on 26 January 1952	9 June 1947	7 April 1949					
28	(titular) Maharaja Gaj Singh II of Jodhpur	Became head of the House on 26 January 1952	26 January 1952	Present					

== Rathore dynasty of Bikaner (c. 1465 – 1947 CE) ==
Rulers–

Name		Reign Began (in CE)	Reign Ended (in CE)	Notes
1	Rao Bika	1465	1504	First ruler of dynasty and founder of Bikaner city.
2	Rao Narayan Singh	1504	1505	
3	Rao Luna Karana (Lon-Karan)	1505	1526	
4	Rao Jait Singh (Jetasi)	1526	1542	
5	Rao Kalyan Mal	1542	1574	Acknowledged the suzerainty of Emperor Akbar at Nagaur in November 1570
6	Rao Rai Singh I (Rai Rai Singh)	1574	1612	Important general in the Mughal army like Raja Man Singh I of Amber
7	Rai Dalpat Singh (Dalip)	1612	1613	
8	Rai Surat Singh Bhuratiya	1613	1631	
9	Rao Karan Singh (Jangalpat Badhshah)	1631	1667	Deposed by Emperor Aurangzeb for dereliction of duty at Attock, 11 January 1667. Exiled to his betel gardens at Karanpura in the Deccan.
10	Anup Singh	1669	1698	To be the first to be granted the title "Maharaja" by Emperor Aurangzeb. Served in the Deccan campaign at Salher in 1672, Bijapur in 1675, and the siege of Golconda in 1687. He was administrator of Aurangabad from 1677 to 1678, 'Hakim' of Adoni in 1678, Imtiazgarh and Adoni from 1689 to 1693, and of Nusratabad and Sukkar from 1693 to 1698 CE.
11	Rao Sarup Singh	1698	1700	He died from smallpox at Adoni in the Deccan on 15 December 1700.
12	Rao Sujan Singh	1700	1735	Ordered to attend Emperor Aurangzeb in the Deccan, where he remained for ten years. Faced invasions from Maharaja Abhai Singh of Jodhpur and Maharaja Bakht Singh of Nagaur, but successfully repulsed both.
13	Rao Zorawar Singh	1735	1746	
14	Rao Gaj Singh	1746	1787	The first of his line granted permission to mint his own coinage by Emperor Alamgir II.
15	Rao Rai Singh II (Raj Singh)	1787	1787	
16	Rao Pratap Singh	1787	1787	Reigned under the Regency of his uncle Surat Singh who poisoned him to assume the throne.
17	Rao Surat Singh	1787	1828	He incurred huge debts due to his military adventures which had reduced his state to near anarchy. Entered the protection of the East India Company with a subsidiary alliance on 9 March 1818.
18	Rao Ratan Singh	1828	1851	Received the hereditary title of Narendra Maharaja from Emperor Akbar Shah II and assisted the British by furnishing them with supplies during the First Afghan War of 1841.
19	Rao Sardar Singh	1851	1872	Assisted the British during the Indian Uprising of 1857 and served in person during many of the battles. Removed the name of the Mughal Emperor from his coinage, replacing the words with Aurang Arya Hind wa Queen Victoria.
20	Dungar Singh	1872	1887	Assisted the British during the Second Afghan War.
21	Ganga Singh	1887	1943	Member of Parliament (Lok Sabha) for Bikaner, 1952–1977. On 28 December 1971, India amended its Constitution to remove the position of the rulers of princely states and their right to receive privy-purse payments, thus making him the last ruler of Bikaner. Imperial Conferences and at the League of Nations.
22	Sadul Singh	1943	1947	Signed the Instrument of Accession to the Dominion of India on 7 August 1947. Merged his state into the present state of Rajasthan, India on 30 March 1949.
23	Karni Singh	1947	1971	First titular ruler.

== Sinsinwar Jat dynasty (c. 1683 – 1947 CE) ==
Rulers-

Portrait	King (Maharaja)	Reign	Notes
	Badan Singh	1722–1755	First Maharaja of the kingdom of Bharatpur.
	Suraj Mal	1755–1763	Son of Badan Singh, known for his political acumen and military powers, expanded his kingdom and took it to its zenith, built the formidable Lohagarh Fort and Deeg Palace. He is often referred as "Plato of Jat tribe." Or Jat Ulysses."
	Jawahar Singh	1763–1768	Son of Suraj Mal. He successfully repelled several attacks, including Ahmad Shah Abdali's, from Bharatpur. Additionally, he oversaw campaigns against the Marathas and Rohillas. With Sikh allies assistance, he seized areas in Bundelkhand and northern Malwa and even sacked Delhi in 1764.
	Ratan Singh	1768–1769	Brother of Jawahar Singh, Ruled only for nine months.
Portrait of Maharaja Kehri Singh of Bharatpur State (cropped)	Kheri Singh	1769–1777	Son (minor) of Ratan Singh.
	Ranjit Singh	1777–1805	Son of Suraj Mal, he participated in the Second Anglo-Maratha War on the side of Marathas and his forces proved to be a tough match for Lord Lake, Defeated britishers several times during the Siege of bharatpur (1805). After months of struggle between bharatpur and britishers, Ranjit Singh finally agreed to peace and Signed the treaty, thus making Bharatpur a princely state.
	Randhir Singh	1805–1823	Son of Ranjit Singh, tried to improve the state's administration several ways, ruled bharatpur for 18 years with harmony and vision, constructed a chhatri and Palace in memeory of his father Ranjit Singh
	Baldeo Singh	1823–1825	Brother of Randhir Singh.
	Balwant Singh	1825–1853	Son of Baldeo Singh.
	Jaswant Singh	1853–1893	Son of Balwant Singh.
	Ram Singh	1893–1900	Son of Jaswant Singh.
	Kishan Singh	1900–1929	Son of Ram Singh
	Brijendra Singh	1929—1947	He was the last ruler of the princely state of Bharatpur. He signed the instrument of accession to the Dominion of India in August 1947 and merged his state to Matsya Union.
	Titular Maharajas		
	Brijendra Singh	1947–1995	He became Member of Parliament, Lok Sabha 1962-1971. He was deprived of his royal rank, titles and honours by the Government of India on 28 December 1971.
	Vishvendra Singh	1995–present	Present ruler

== Gaur dynasty (c. 400 -1947) ==
  - Gaur dynasty belong to the Surya vansh, they are descendants of the Maharaj Bharat(brother of lord rama), they ruled many parts of Rajasthan namely:- Sarwar, Fatehgarh,kekri, Maroth, Gaurati, Ajmer, Junia, Kishangarh, whole gorwar & Gaurati region was named due to glory of this dynasty. Gaurati State is the head seat of Whole Gaur Clan and a direct descendant of Bharat and Pala dynasty.

== Gaur dynasty of Gaurati (c. 1180-1949) ==
List of Gaur dynasty rulers of Gaurati
Serial No.	Portrait	Maharawal	Notes
1		Raja Shivpal Singh	Eldest Son of Bhimpal Singh last ruler of pal dynasty
2		Raja Haripal Singh	
3		Raja Padam Singh I	
4		Raja Karan Singh I	
5		Raja Narayan Singh	
6		Maharaja Rai Singh	
7		Maharaja Chandrasen Singh	
8		Maharaja Madho Singh	
9		Maharaja Narayan Singh II	
10		Maharaja Ajit Singh	
11		Maharaja Fateh Singh	
12		Maharaja Padam Singh II	
13		Maharaja Abhai Singh	
14		Maharaja Man Singh	
15		Maharaja Chattar Singh	
16		Maharaja Agar Singh I	
17		Maharaja Takht Singh I	
18		Rawal Amar Singh	
19		Rawal Sardar Singh	
20		Rawal Sujan Singh	
21		Rawal Gulab Singh	
22		Rawal Sher Singh	
23		Rawal Zalim Singh	
24		Maharawal Prithviraj Singh	
25		Maharawal Rajranveer Pratap Singh I	participated in War of Dharmat & Samugarh against Mughal Badhshah Aurangzeb
26		Maharawal Takht Singh II	Shifted his capital to kekri
27		Maharawal Raj Singh I	
28		Maharawal Agar Singh	
29		Maharawal Bhimpal Singh II	
30		Maharawal Mahadev Singh I	
31		Maharawal Jagat Singh	
32		Maharawal Sajjan Singh	
33		Maharawal Megh Singh	
34		Maharawal Karan Singh II	
35		Maharawal Indupraksh Singh	
36		Maharawal Shekhvyas Singh	
37		Maharawal Roopchandar Singh	
38		Maharawal Mangalchandar Singh	
39		Maharawal Ganpat Singh	
40		Maharawal Mahadev Singh II	Rejected the treaty with Britishers and remained only independent Monarch
41		Maharawal Murlidhar Singh	Last Monarch & First Titular king, a friend of Adolf Hitler & participated in world war
42		Maharawal Shyam Singh	Titular King
43		Maharawal Raj Singh II aka Rajkumar Singh	Present titular king

== Jhala dynasty of Jhalawar (c. 1838-1949) ==
List of Jhala dynasty rulers of Jhalawar
Serial No.	Maharaj-Rana	Reign (CE)	Notes
1	Maharaj Rana Madan Singh	8 Apr 1838 – 1845	
2	Maharaj Rana Prithvi Singh	1845 – 29 Aug 1875	
3	Maharaj Rana Zalim Singh II	29 Aug 1875 – 1 Jan 1899	
4	HH Maharaj Rana Sir Bhawani Singh	1 Jan 1899 – 13 Apr 1929	
5	HH Maharaj Rana Sir Rajendra Singh	13 Apr 1929 - 2 Sep 1943	
6	HH Maharaj Rana Sir Harish Chandra Singh	2 Sep 1943 – 15 Aug 1947	

== See also ==
- Rajasthan
- History of Rajasthan
- Outline of Rajasthan
- List of Rajput dynasties
- List of battles of Rajasthan
- Timeline of history of Rajasthan

== Sources ==
- Mishra, Vibhuti Bhushan (1966). The Gurjara-Pratīhāras and Their Times. S. Chand. OCLC 3948567.
- Puri, Baij Nath (1957). The history of the Gurjara-Pratihāras. Munshiram Manoharlal. OCLC 2491084.
- Somani, Ram Vallabh (1976). History of Mewar, from Earliest Times to 1751 A.D. Mateshwari. OCLC 2929852.
