= Battle of Fatehpur Sikri =

1721 battle

- Part of Mughal-Jat Wars
Date	26 September 1721
Location	Fatehpur Sikri
Result	Jat victory

Belligerents
Jat Kingdom	Mughal Empire

Commanders and leaders
Muhkam Singh Sinsinwar; Shardul Singh	Nilkanth Nagar

Strength
6,000 Jats	10,000 Mughals forces

Casualties and losses
5,000 jats killed	Unknown

The Battle of Fatehpur Sikri occurred near Fatehpur Sikri on 26 September 1721 between Mughal forces and those of the Jats. 10,000 Mughal forces were led by Nilkanth (the deputy governor of Agra) against 6,000 soldiers led by Muhkam Singh Sinsinwar of Thun and Shardul Singh of Pathena. Nilkanth was killed during the battle, ultimately a failed attempt by the Mughal to re-establish themselves.

== Battle ==
Saadat Khan, who had played a leading part in the overthrow of Husain Ali Khan, was rewarded with the governorship of Agra (October, 1720). In February, 1721, he took leave from the Court to look after his new assignment. The Jats of Mathura were proving intractable, so he took the field against them and forced the rebels to take shelter in their fortresses. Then he besieged them and succeeded in capturing four of them situated near Mathura. A number of the defenders were put to the sword, Saadat Khan also lost 400 men in the process. Pleased with this news, the Emperor sent him a congratulatory message with a Khilat and a jewelled dagger. However, he could not personally follow up his success, as he was temporarily recalled to help suppress Ajit Singh. In his absence his deputy, Nilkanth Nagar, took up his unfinished task. With a force of 10,000 horses and more of infantry he attacked Jat villages in the environs of Fatehpur Sikri and penetrated as far as Pichuna (8 miles south of Bharatpur). Here he captured some villagers and their animals. But when he was returning to their camp near Fatehpur Sikri on 26 September 1721 (5th Zil Hijjah, 1133 II.) Muhkam Singh and Shardul Singh of Halena whom Churaman had deputed earlier, fell upon him with a force of 6,000 on horse and foot, and fought a severe battle with the deputy governor. Although Nilkanth Nagar was the master of double the number of men, he could cope with the valiant Jats were beaten. In course of the fight he received bullet shot and fell down, but stood up in bravery and mounted his elephant. Those jats who could manage, escaped, while the rest surrendered their horses and arms and became prisoners in the hands of the mughals., nagar taking all the elephants, the captives and other goods, went to his place and obtained money in the form of fine from every prisoner according to his status.

== See also ==
- Decline of the Mughal Empire
