= Giriraj Kaur =

Regent of Bharatpur from 1900 to 1918

- Maaji Sahiba
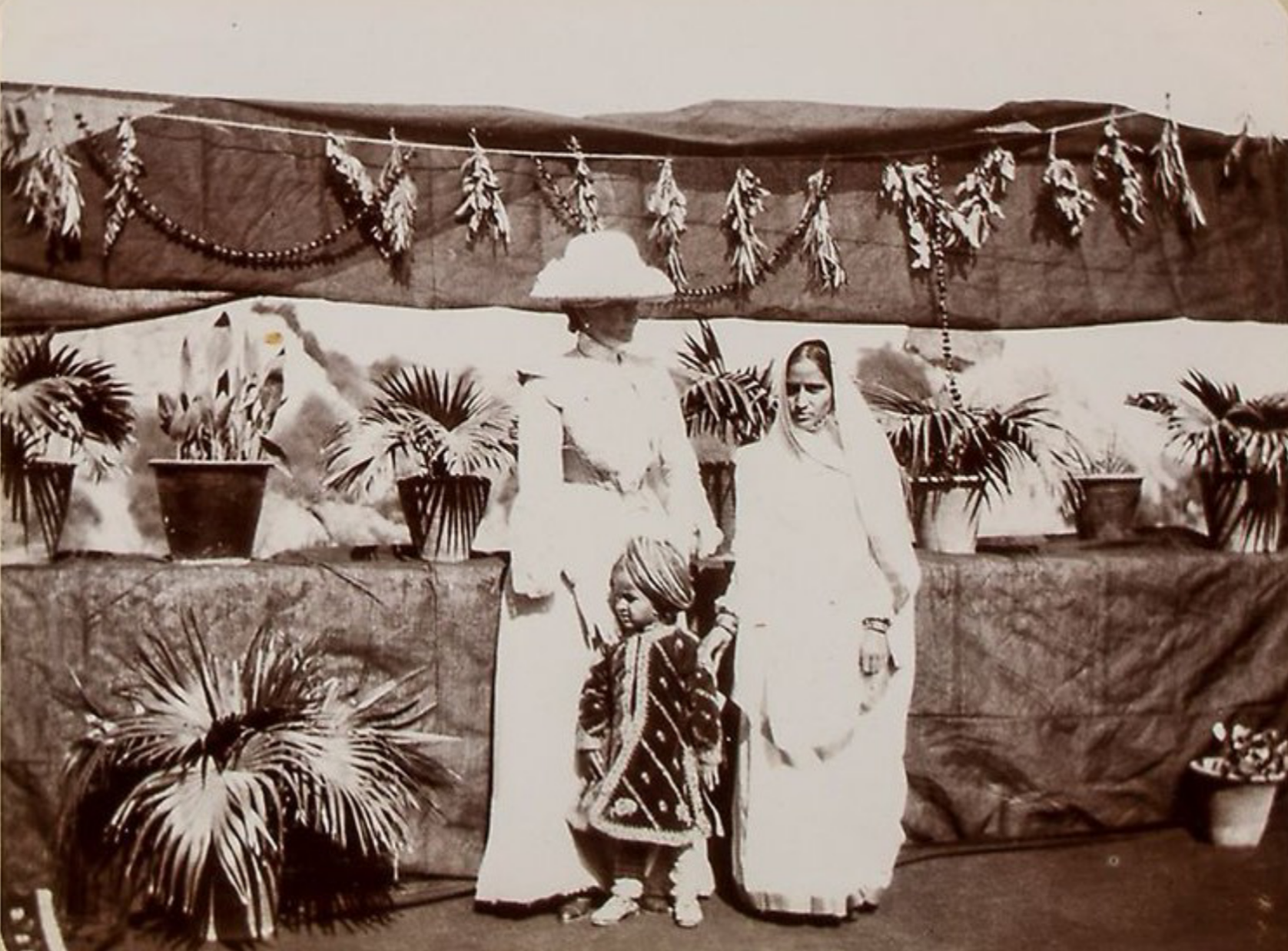

Regent of Bharatpur State
- Tenure: 27 August 1900 – 28 November 1918
- Died: 24 August 1922; Lohagarh Fort, Bharatpur, Rajasthan, British Raj (now India)
- Spouse: Ram Singh
- Issue: Kishan Singh
- House: Bharatpur (by marriage)

Giriraj Kaur was a Maharani of Bharatpur as the wife of Ram Singh. After her husband's deposition in 1900, she was the regent of Bharatpur during the minority of her son Kishan Singh.

== Background ==
She was the daughter of the Zamindar of Deoli in Bharatpur and married Ram Singh, the Maharaja of Bharatpur, as his second wife. She had a son with her husband, Kishan Singh, who was born on 4 October 1899 at Moti Mahal, Bharatpur.

== Regent of Bharatpur ==
Her husband, Ram Singh, visited Mount Abu in 1900, where he killed one of his private servants. As a consequence, he was deposed by the Government of India on 27 August 1900, and his infant son, Kishan Singh, was installed on the same date on the throne of Bharatpur. During his minority, his mother, Giriraj Kaur, acted as regent from 27 August 1900 to 28 November 1918, until he came of age. She sent her son to Mayo College, Ajmer, and appointed special tutors to guide his studies.

She was granted the Imperial Order of the Crown of India in the 1918 New Year Honours list. She took great interest in the art of her country, particularly in architecture and gardening, and was compared to Nawab Shahjahan, Begum of Bhopal.

=== Visits to England ===
During her son Kishan Singh's minority, she, along with him, extended visits to England in 1908 and 1910 for the benefit of his health and were presented to George V and Mary of Teck.

=== After regency ===
On 28 November 1918, Kishan Singh was invested with full ruling powers by Viscount Chelmsford, thereby becoming the de facto ruler of Bharatpur. Kishan Singh wasted so much money that he nearly bankrupted Bharatpur. In 1924 alone, he spent 7.8 million rupees, which was more than twice the State's income. His mother, during her lifetime, had striven her best to stop his excesses.

== Delhi Durbars ==
She attended the Delhi Durbars of 1903 and 1911.

=== Durbar of 1903 ===
She, along with her son, Kishan Singh, then only three years, attended the Delhi Durbar of 1903.

=== Durbar of 1911 ===
She, along with her son, Kishan Singh, attended the Delhi Durbar of 1911, and at a reception held on 13 December 1911 by Winifred Hardinge, she was presented to Mary of Teck.

== Philanthropy ==
=== Lady Hardinge Medical College ===
She contributed a sum of Rs. 7,500 for the marble flooring of the entrance hall of Lady Hardinge Medical College, which is named after Winifred Hardinge.

== World War I ==
During World War I, she placed all the resources of her State at the disposal of the Government of India, including two motor cars and a chauffeur, with all expenses covered, and contributed Rs. 2,000 to the Indian Relief Fund.

== Moti Mahal Palace ==
In 1916, she built the Moti Mahal Palace in white sandstone.

== Death ==
She died at Lohagarh Fort, Bharatpur on 24 August 1922.

== Honours ==
Country	Year	Honour	Class	Ribbon	Post-nominal letters
British India	1903	Delhi Durbar Medal (1903)	Gold		
British India	1911	Delhi Durbar Medal (1911)	Gold		
British India	1918	Imperial Order of the Crown of India			CI
