= Saadat Khan =

Nawab of Awadh from 1722 to 1739

- Nawab of Awadh; Burhan ul Mulk; Bahadur Jang; Mir Atish (Commander of Arsenal); Khuld-e-Ashian (Note: Posthumous title)
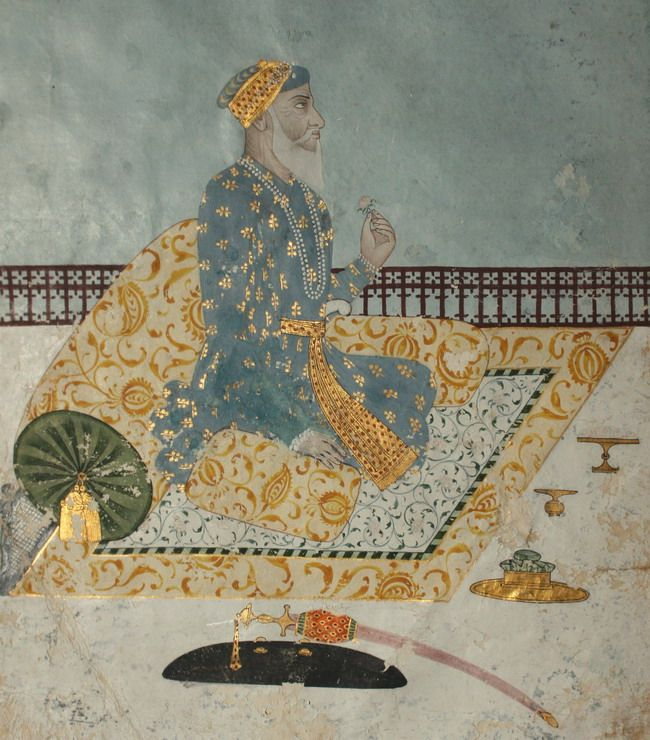
- Saadat Khan

1st Nawab of Oudh
- Reign: 26 January 1722 – 19 March 1739
- Predecessor: Position established
- Successor: Safdar Jung
- Born: c. 1680; Nishapur, Khorasan, Safavid Iran
- Died: 19 March 1739 (aged 58–59); Delhi, Delhi Subah, Mughal Empire
- Burial: Sadat Ali Khan Tomb, Kaiser Bagh, Lucknow
- Issue: One Son (died infant of smallpox) and Five daughters
- House: Nishapuri-Iranian
- Father: Muhammad Nasir

Saadat Khan Nishapuri (born Mir Muhammad Amin; c. 1680 – 19 March 1739) was the first Nawab of the Kingdom of Awadh from 26 January 1722 to 1739 and the son of Muhammad Nasir. At age 25, he accompanied his father on the final campaign of the Mughal Emperor Aurangzeb against the Marathas in the Deccan, and the emperor awarded him the title of Khan Bahadur for his service.

== Early life ==
Khan's date of birth has not been recorded. According to historian Ashirbadi Lal Srivastava, Khan was born in c. 1680 and his birth name was Mir Muhammad Amin. His father was Mir Muhammad Nasir, a merchant in Khorasan. Khan had one elder brother, Mir Muhammad Baqar. One of their ancestors was Mir Shamsuddin, a sayyid (descendant of Islamic prophet Muhammad) and a kazi (Islamic judge) in Nishapur. He was a twenty-first-generation descendant of Musa al-Kadhim, the seventh imam of Shia Islam.

The Safavid dynasty began declining at the end of the 17th century. Sultan Husayn (the last Safavid monarch) alienated his court's nobility, and Khan's family was reduced to poverty. To try his luck in India, Khan's father and elder brother migrated to Bengal in late 1707 during the reign of Mughal Emperor Bahadur Shah I. From there they went to Bihar, settled in Patna and were granted an allowance by Murshid Quli Khan, the first Nawab of Bengal. At this time, Khan lived in Nishapur. According to historian Kamaluddin Haider, his wife ridiculed him for being a hanger-on in her father's house. Stung, Khan migrated to India in search of a job. According to historian Ghulam Ali, he arrived in Patna in 1708 or 1709. Khan's father died before his arrival, and was buried "some distance away from his new home". In 1709, the brothers started for Delhi in search of employment.

Khan was employed by an amil (village head), and lived in poverty during his first year in Delhi. In July 1710, he and his brother were employed by Sarbuland Khan. Sarbuland Khan, a fellow Persian and sayyid, was the faujdar (garrison commander) of Kara-Manikpur in Prayagraj and made Khan his mir manzil (camp superintendent). After the defeat and death of Azim-ush-Shan (Sarbuland Khan's employer), Jahandar Shah ascended the Mughal throne and transferred Sarbuland Khan to Ahmedabad; Khan accompanied him in November 1712. By the end of the year, the relationship between Khan and Sarbuland Khan had deteriorated. Heavy rain and high winds tore down Khan's tents; Sarbuland Khan had to spend the night in a bullock cart, and criticised Khan for putting the tents up in a poor place. Khan disagreed, and Sarbuland Khan accused him of behaving like a haft hazari (master of seven thousand troops). Khan replied that that was an "auspicious prophecy" of his career; after moving to Delhi and becoming a haft hazari, he would rejoin Sarbuland Khan's service.

On 12 January 1713, Farrukhsiyar ascended the Mughal throne with the help of the Sayyid brothers. During his reign Khan arrived at Delhi. With the patronage of Muhammad Jafar, a friend of Farrukhsiyar, Khan succeeded in getting a mansab of a hazari (1,000 horses) and became the commander of the Wala-Shahi regiment. Jafar's death in 1716 left Khan without any patron in the royal court. He failed to get any promotion in the following three years.

In 1719, Farrukshiyar was deposed by the Sayyid brothers with the help of Marathas.

During the reign of Shah Jahan II, Khan accompanied Syed Hassan Ali Khan Barha (the elder Sayyid brother) in his expedition against Maharaja Jai Singh II of Jaipur. Khan's husn-i-akhlaq (elegance of manners) and military skill won him the patronage of Syed Hussain Ali Khan, the younger Sayyid brother. Hussain Ali Khan appointed him faujdar (garrison commander) of Hindaun and Bayana in present-day Rajasthan on 6 October 1719, and Khan took charge in November. The Rajput and Jat zamindars (landlords) were rebelling; Khan began recruiting more troops, and borrowed from the wazir (minister) of the province. With the help of auxiliary troops, Khan suppressed the rebellion in the area; the zamindars, attacked one by one, were forced to surrender. After restoring law and order within six months of his appointment, Khan was promoted to the rank of 15 sad-izat (commander of 1,500 horses) in the army.

By the end of 1719, friction arose between Nizam-ul-Mulk and the Sayyid brothers. Nizam-ul-Mulk killed Dilawar Khan (Syed Hussain Ali Khan's agent) at the Asirgarh Fort in June 1720 and killed Sayyid Alam Khan, a relative (nephew, brother's son ) of the Sayyid brothers, in August. Hussain Ali Khan decided to march to the Deccan Plateau, and Hassan Ali Khan agreed to march towards Delhi. Mughal Emperor Muhammad Shah also started for the Deccan from Agra. A few days before Shah began his journey, a conspiracy was hatched at the royal camp to kill Hussain Ali Khan. The chief conspirator was Muhammad Amin Khan Turani, an uncle of Nizam-ul-Mulk. Khan switched his allegiance to the conspirators, for reasons not documented in contemporary records. Khafi Khan writes that Khan was incited to join the conspiracy due to his anger at the murder of Farrukhsiyar. The conspirators met frequently to outline a plan to assassinate Hussain Ali Khan, who was killed by Haidar Beg Daulat on 8 October 1720. The following day, Muhammad Shah held a royal durbar and rewarded Khan and his co-conspirators. He was given the title Saadat Khan Bahadur (lord of good fortune), and was promoted to 5,000 zat and 3,000 horses. According to an anonymous Persian historian, Khan plundered Hussain Ali Khan's treasury with the consent of the Mughal Emperor.

== Governor of Akbarabad ==
Khan was promoted to a rank of 6,000 zat and 5,000 horses, and was appointed governor of Akbarabad province (present-day Agra), on 15 October 1720. He received the title Burhan-ul-Mulk, and appointed Nilkanth as his deputy.

When he reached Akbarabad, Khan decided to put down a Jat rebellion and defeated the Jats of Mathura and Bharatpur. They fled to their mud forts on the Delhi-Mathura road. Khan besieged them, capturing four of the forts. Nilkanth's troops fought Muhkam Singh (a son of Jat leader Churaman) in September 1721, and Nilkanth was killed in the battle.

In October, Khan decided to fight Churaman. Churaman's nephew, Badan Singh, defected to the Mughal side. However, Khan Dauran dismissed Khan as governor of Akbarabad.

== Governor of Awadh ==
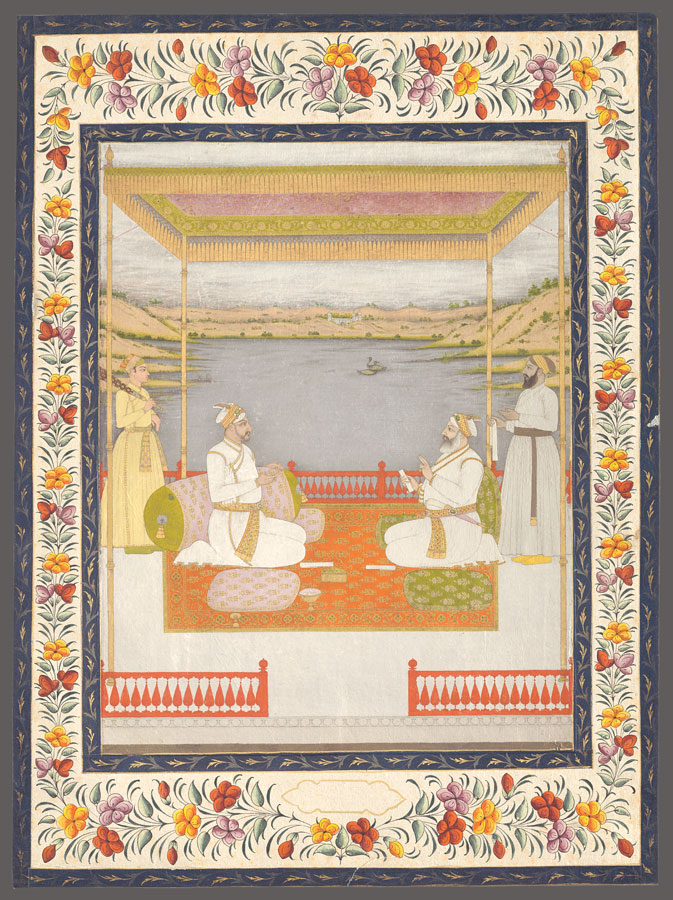
Sa’adat Khan and Khan Dauran seated on a terrace

After his dismissal from Agra, Khan went to Delhi. He was appointed governor of Awadh (in present-day Uttar Pradesh) on 9 September 1722 after the transfer of provincial governor Girdhar Bahadur. Khan gathered his troops including Kalika Prasad Tandon and recruited more before leaving for the province. During his journey, he stayed at Farrukhabad. Muhammad Khan Bangash, the Hindustani Pathan chief, gave him information about the strength of Shaikhzadas (a community which ruled Lucknow). He advised Khan to befriend the sheikhs of Kakori, adversaries of the Shaikhzadas, before entering Lucknow. Khan did so, and the sheikhs informed him about the strengths and weaknesses of the Shaikhzadas of Lucknow. He then marched towards Lucknow, and camped on the city's outskirts. Khan crossed the Gomti River by night, and silently entered the city with his artillery. After pulling down the sword which hung on the gates of the city, he attacked the Shaikhzadas at the Akbari Gate. In the ensuing battle, the Shaikhzadas were defeated and driven from Panchmahala (their palace).

At the start of Khan's governorship of Awadh, its zamindars refused to follow Mughal regulations. Khan tried to solve Awadh's fiscal and jagirdar problems, sending agents to assess crop yields. He soon realized that, except for the zamindars, no one (including the local officials) welcomed his scheme; jagirdar agents tried to prevent its implementation. The jagirdar's amils (personal staff) viewed his scheme as an attempt by Khan to subvert the existing jagirdar system. This alarmed him, since he did not want to alienate the jagirdars. In response, he offered a discount on the jagir assessment paid by the jagirdars. Saiyad Ghulam Ali, author of Imad-us-Sadat, calls this system ijara. This scheme stabilised provincial administration, since the jagirdars no longer had to send their staff to the fields; the amils (appointed by the governor) were now accountable to him, and local officials were to approach them directly to resolve disputes. Thus, Khan ended the administrative authority of the jagirdars over their jagirs. In 1730, Burhan-ul-Mulk sent Mir Muhammad Salah Khan Baraha and Sayyid Munawwar Ali Tirmizi of Bilgram to the qasbahs around Lucknow to recruit men for his army.

== Confrontation with Nader Shah ==
In early 1739, Persian ruler Nader Shah invaded India. To help Mughal emperor Muhammad Shah, Khan marched with a cavalry of 30,000 from Awadh. During his stay at Panipat, Nader Shah's army tried vainly to intercept him. On 12 February, Khan joined Muhammad Shah's forces at Karnal. When Nader Shah learned about the reinforcement, he moved his camp three miles from the Mughal side.

The Persian army clashed with Khan's troops on 22 February. When he heard the news, Khan picked up the sword he had laid in front of Muhammad Shah and asked his permission to attack the Persian army. According to historian Hari Charan Das, the Mughal emperor distrusted the Persian Khan and made him swear allegiance in the name of the Quran. Nizam-ul-Mulk further delayed his advance by claiming that Khan's troops were tired from a month-long march, and Khan would soon have to retreat because there were only three hours of daylight left. Nusrat Jung told him that the Mughal forces were not ordered to fight during the day. Khan, refusing to heed their pleas, ordered his troops to assemble. Although they were tired and most were reluctant to fight, 4,000 cavalry and 1,000 infantry joined him.

When the Persian soldiers saw Khan advancing, they pretended to flee the battlefield; Khan chased them two miles from the Mughal camp, and sent couriers to Muhammad Shah asking for reinforcements. Khan Dauran, commander of the right wing and nearest to Khan, was dispatched with 8,000 horses. During the afternoon, the Mughal emperor joined Khan on the battlefield. Khan formed the right wing of the imperial army, on the east.

On 23 February 1739 at 1 pm, he began advancing towards Nader Shah's army. Shah's army shot arrows at Khan and his troops, and Khan charged them. The Persian army strategically retreated, leaving their weapons. Khan thought that they had fled, and again sent couriers to the Mughal emperor requesting reinforcements. The Persian army then began a cavalry attack, which killed many in Khan's army. Khan's nephew Sher Jung, lost control of his war elephant which charged khan's elephant and drove it into the Persian ranks. Khan started shooting arrow in to enemy ranks to avoid capture. A Turkmen soldier in the Persian army from Nishapur, Khan's birthplace, recognized him; he climbed to the howdah (seat on an elephant), hailed Khan and asked him to surrender. Khan was taken as a prisoner to Nader Shah's camp.

After the Isha prayer, he was brought before Nader Shah. Asked why he fought against a Persian of the same religion (Shia Islam), Khan replied that he did not want to betray the Mughal emperor. During their conversation, Shah appreciated Khan's patriotism and love of his religion. He asked Khan to outline a plan in which he could extort money from Muhammad Shah and return to Persia to fight the Turks. Khan replied that Nizam-ul-Mulk "is the key of the empire of India", and advised Shah to negotiate with him. Shah and Khan wrote to the Nizam the next morning, and the Mughals agreed to pay ₹5 million (equivalent to ₹3.8 billion or US$40 million in 2023) to the Persian conqueror.

On 25 February, Muhammad Shah made Ghazi ud-Din Khan Feroze Jung II, the eldest son of Nizam-ul-Mulk, mir bakshi (equivalent to an army's paymaster general). This angered Khan, who desired the appointment and told Nader Shah that ₹5 million (equivalent to ₹3.8 billion or US$40 million in 2023) was a small portion of the Mughal treasury. He advised Nader Shah to conquer Delhi (where he could loot jewels, cash and other valuables), Shah gave Khan permission to attack the city. When Muhammad Shah arrived at the Persian camp, he was arrested and his harem was confiscated. Nader Shah made Khan the army's wakil-i-mutaliq (regent plenipotentiary), and Muhammad Shah was also forced to accept him.

Khan and Tehmasp Khan Jalair started for Delhi with an army of 4,000 horses on 7 March. Khan carried a letter from Muhammad Shah to Lutfullah Khan Sadiq, the governor of Delhi, asking Sadiq to give Jalair the key to the palaces. Khan reached Delhi on 9 March, and welcomed both the emperors in Shalimar Bagh eight days later. On the night of 19/20 March he retired to his house, and died before dawn. There is no consensus amongst historians about his cause of death. According to historian Abul Qasim Lahori, Khan died of "bodily ailments". Haricharan Das believes that he succumbed to a cancer which had developed in his legs. Rustam Ali, the author of Tarikh-i-Hind, says that Khan committed suicide by drinking poison after humiliation by Nader Shah.

== Issue and succession ==
Sadat Khan married first at Nishapur, Khorasan, Persia before 1706, a daughter of his uncle, Mirza Muhammad Yusuf, married second at Delhi, 1709, a daughter (d.s.p. soon after her marriage) of Ashraf Ali Khan Bahadur a military officer in the Imperial army, married third at Delhi 1710 a daughter of Sayyid Talib Muhammad Khan Asaf Jahi, married for the fourth time at Agra, 1720, Riti Begum Sahiba, daughter of Nawab Muhammad Taqi Khan Bahadur, sometime Subadar of Agra. Married (fourth or one of the above?), a daughter of Khwaja Zachariah, a descendant of Khwaja Ahrar. He had also married Khadija Khanum Sahiba, a former slave girl from the household of Sayyid Talib Muhammad Khan, presented to him in the dower of the latter's daughter. He had five daughters. He gave his eldest daughter in marriage to his nephew, Muhammad Muqim, better known as Safdar Jung. Khan's sister was Safdar Jung's mother; his father was Sayadat Khan, a descendant of Qara Yusuf. Safdar Jung succeeded Sadat Khan as ruler of Awadh. All subsequent Nawabs and Kings of Awadh down to Wajid Ali Shah are thus descended from Sadat Khan through his daughter.

== Notes ==
Preceded by --	Mughal Governor of Agra; 15 Oct 1720 – 9 Sep 1722	Succeeded by --
Preceded by --	Mughal Governor of Awadh; 9 Sep 1722 – 1732	Succeeded by --
Preceded by new creation	Subadar Nawab of Awadh; 1732 – 19 Mar 1739	Succeeded by Abu´l Mansur Mohammad Moqim Khan
