= Giriraj =

Giriraj is a given name. People with the name include:

- Giriraj Singh
- Giriraj Kabra
- Giriraj Kaushalya
- Giriraj Kishore (writer)
- Giriraj Poddar
- Giriraj Kishore
- Giriraj Prasad Tiwari
- Giriraj Kaur
- Giriraj Mani Pokharel
- Giriraja Swami
