= Muhkam Singh =

Chieftain of Sinsini from 1721 to 1722

Raja Muhkam Singh

Chieftain of Sinsini
- Reign: 20 September 1721 – 18 November 1722
- Predecessor: Churaman
- Successor: Badan Singh
- Died: 18 November 1722
- House: Sinsinwar
- Father: Churaman
- Religion: Hinduism

Raja Muhkam Singh was a chieftain and son of Churaman. He succeeded his father to the leadership of Bharatpur from 20 September 1721 to 18 November 1722. Fransoo, while giving the genealogy of the Bharatpur rulers, mentions him as the first Raja, who set up his Raj at Thoon (in Bharatpur in modern day Rajasthan, India). It appears, however, that he himself adopted the title of the Raja.

== Life ==
Muhkam was a capable leader, he had proved his martial ability by defeating and killing the deputy subedar of Agra and by defeating Saadat Khan, the Viceroy of Agra. Muhkam had also challenged Mughal authority by helping rebels like Ajit Singh of Mewar and Chhatrasal. The Mughal Emperor had no choice but to send Jai Singh II of Amber against the Rajput. Badan Singh joined Jai Singh prepared an army of 14,000 men and marched towards the Jat strongholds. Muhkam Singh attacked Jai Singh's army at night several times leading to heavy losses on both sides. Badan Singh who was with the army of Rajah Jai Singh pointed out the weak spots and helped in the reduction of two fortified outworks. After conducting the defence for about two months, Muhkam fled to Jodhpur where he paid the Jodhpur Maharaja Ajit Singh three lakh rupees to help him against Jai Singh. A Jodhpur army was sent under Bijairaj Bhandari to save Thoon, however by the time the Jodhpur army reached Jobner, it was too late as most of the Jat strongholds had fallen and many smaller forts had been dismantled. Muhkam had no choice but to go into exile, a Mughal army was sent to chase him, however he was saved by the Maharaja of Jodhpur. Badan Singh was thus made the Thakur of Bharatpur by Jai Singh.
