= Rajaram of Sinsini =

Chieftain of Sinsini from 1670 to 1688

Rajaram Jat
- Chieftain of Sinsini
- Reign: 1670 – 4 July 1688
- Predecessor: Gokula Jat
- Successor: Churaman
- Died: 4 July 1688
- Dynasty: Sinsinwar
- Father: Bhajja/Bhagwant Singh
- Religion: Hinduism

Rajaram Jat (died 4 July 1688) was a chieftain of Sinsini, who led organised rebellion against Mughal emperor Aurangzeb after Gokula Jat execution. He is notable for desecrating the tomb of Mughal Emperor Akbar in 1688. He united the Jats, modernised their military capabilities, and employed guerrilla tactics to disrupt Mughal authority in the regions around Agra, Mathura, and the Yamuna river.

Rajaram successfully resisted Mughal forces, defeating Nawab Khan-i-Jahan Bahadur Zafar Jang Kokaltash in battle near Sinsini, which allowed to gain control over parganas such as Bhuma, Hodal, Kuthumbar, and Palwal. His leadership laid the foundation for the later establishment of the Kingdom of Bharatpur. After his death in 1688, his brother Churaman and his son continued their resistance against Mughal Empire.

== Early life ==
Rajaram was born in Sinsini, in present-day Bharatpur, Rajasthan, to Bhajja Singh, a Sinsinwar Jat zamindar. He was the cousin of Churaman, son of Bhajja’s brother Brij Raj. The Jats, an agrarian community with martial traditions, had faced Mughal repression, notably after the execution of Gokula Jat. By 1685, with Mughal forces preoccupied in the Deccan, Rajaram, alongside Ramki Chahar (also known as Ramchehra) of Soghar, emerged as a leader to revive Jat resistance.

== Leadership and military ==
After the failure of Gokula’s rebellion of 1669, which lacked proper training, equipment, and defenses, Rajaram introduced major reforms. He united various Jat clans, such as the Sinsinwar and Sogaria, and formed an alliance with Ramki Chahar (also called Ramchehara), who controlled Sogar castle, located four miles southeast of Bharatpur. Rajaram also built connections with Jats in Sidgiri (Bayana, Rupbasia) and Ranthambhor, opposing the Amber ruler Ram Singh.

Rajaram trained Jat farmers in using firearms, horse riding, and military discipline, organising them into regiments led by appointed captains to ensure discipline among the independent Jats. He built simple mud forts, known as kachha forts, in dense jungles, strengthened with mud walls, to serve as bases, safe havens, and storage for looted goods, addressing the defensive shortcomings seen at Tilpat in 1669. Rajaram adopted the Jat "Dhar" guerrilla warfare tactic, avoiding direct battles with larger Mughal forces and focusing on swift, surprise attacks.

== Rebellion and Raids ==
From 1685, Rajaram forces disrupted Mughal trade routes between Dholpur - Delhi, and Agra - Ajmer via Hindaun and Bayana, plundering caravans and villages alongside allied Narukas, Panwars, Gujars, and Mevs. The Mughal governor of Agra, Safi Khan, was largely confined to Agra Fort, and in Mathura, only the Jama Mosque was considered safe from Jat raids. The Jats, supported by local communities around Agra and Delhi, revolted against Mughal authority, expelling imperial revenue officials and jagirdars’ agents from the parganas between Delhi and Agra, weakening Mughal control in the region.

=== Desecration of Akbar tomb ===
In 1686, Rajaram attempted to plunder Akbar’s tomb at Sikandra but was repelled by Mughal faujdar Mir Abul Fazl, who was wounded and later awarded the title Iltifat Khan with an increased rank of 200 cavalrymen. Rajaram then looted Shikarpur and Ratanpur. Near Dholpur, his forces ambushed the baggage train of Mughal commander Aghar Khan, a Turanni warrior traveling from Kabul to the Emperor’s camp at Bijapur. The Jats attacked the disorganized Mughal troops, seizing carts, horses, and women. Aghar Khan impulsively pursued the raiders with a small force and was killed along with his son-in-law and 80 followers, though 200 Jats also died in the skirmish.

In early 1688, Rajaram attacked Mir Ibrahim (Mahabat Khan) near Sikandra, losing 400 men but retreating to regroup. Exploiting the delayed arrival of Agra’s governor-designate Shaista Khan, Rajaram returned to Sikandra on 28 March 1688, plundering Akbar’s tomb and seizing gold, silver, carpets, and lamps. Reports by Niccolao Manucci and Ishwardas Nagar suggest the Jats also burned Akbar’s bones. The inaction of Mughal deputy Muhammad Baqa led to his rank being reduced by 500 and Khan-i-Jahan’s by 1,000 cavalrymen. Jat forces further attacked villages supporting the Taj Mahal and captured Mughal officers at Khurja and Palwal.

=== Mughal Campaigns Against the Jats ===
In the first of two Mughal campaigns led by Nawab Khan-i-Jahan Bahadur Zafar Jang Kokaltash against the Jats of Sinsini, the armies of the Amber state ruler and Mathura’s faujdar joined him. Despite their combined strength, Rajaram’s Jat forces defeated them. This victory allowed the Jats to seize control of the parganas of Bhuma, Hodal, Kuthumbar, and Palwal. Historian R. P. Rana, citing a contemporary petition, notes that the active support of Jats around Agra and Delhi was key to Rajaram’s success. After a month-long unsuccessful campaign, Khan-i-Jahan retreated to Mathura.

In the second campaign, Khan-i-Jahan besieged Ram Chahar’s fortress at Sogar, capturing it and killing Ram Chahar among other Jat casualties. However, when Khan-i-Jahan targeted Sinsini, Rajaram defeated him in a battle nearby, forcing another retreat to Mathura. This battle also saw the deaths of several prominent Rajput Sardars from Amber fighting for the Mughals.

== Death ==
In 1688, Rajaram allied with the Chauhan Rajputs in a land dispute against the Shekhawats, supported by Mughal faujdar Murtaza Khan, Bidar Bakht, Rao Raja Anirudh Singh of Bundi, and Maharao Kishor Singh Hada. On 4 July 1688, during a battle, Rajaram led a charge against the Mughal center, defeating the Hada chief and forcing Anirudh Singh to flee. A Mughal musketeer hidden in a tree shot Rajaram in the chest, killing him instantly. His death led to the Chauhans’ defeat, and his severed head was presented to Aurangzeb on 5 September 1688.

== See also ==
- Decline of the Mughal Empire
- Bharatpur State
