= Timeline of history of Rajasthan =

Aspect of Rajasthan history

The history of human settlement in the west Indian state of Rajasthan dates back to about 5,000 years ago.

== Timeline ==
Timeline of History of Rajasthan

- 4600 BC The development of Sonthi culture (between Saraswati and Darswati in Hanumangarh district) started.
- 4500–3200 BC: Mesolithic site of Bagor
- 3000–2000 BC: Chalcolithic culture of Ganeshwar, Balathal and Ahar
- 2600 BC: Mature Harappan phase of the Indus Valley civilization begins covering the city of Kalibangan
- 1900 BC Saraswati river becomes extinct.
- 1800 BC The Indus Valley civilisation collapses due to a combination of drought and a decline in trade with Egypt and Mesopotamia.
- 1800 BC The Ghaggar-Hakra system retracts its reach towards the foothills of the Himalaya, leading to erratic and less extensive floods that make inundation agriculture less sustainable.
- 1750 BC End of Kalibangan culture.
- 1500 BC entry of Indo Aryans into Rajasthan (??)
- 1500 BC End of copper culture in Ozhiyana (Bhilwara).
- 1000 BC Mahabharata war according to archeology
- 700–300 BC: Matsya Kingdom, one of the sixteen Mahajanpadas, its capital was Viratnagar, modern day Bairat
- 600 BC end of Vedic period.
- 500 BC Development of civilization started in Tilwara
- 443 BC Inscription made in the temple of Bhilot Mata in Bandli village of Ajmer (the oldest inscription in Rajasthan).
- 300 BC–300 AD: Period of small Republics and Kingdoms like Malava, Shivi, Arjunayana, Yaudheya etc.
- 200 BC Creation of two inscriptions related to Vaishnav sect in Nagri (Chittor)
- 187 BC Shivi tribe settled in Madhyamika from Punjab.
- 187 BC Yavana (Greek) king Dimit attacks Chittor.
- 150 BC Malav Ganas came to Rajasthan and Malwa.
- 88 BC Indo-Scythians established themselves in the Indus region.
- 75 BC The Indo-Scythians captured eastern Rajasthan.
- 57 BC Vikram Samvat begins.
- 78 AD Shaka Samvant begins.
- 119 AD Shaka Nahapan captured south-eastern Rajasthan.
- 551 AD Vasudev Chauhan established the Chahamanas of Shakambhari around the Sambhar region, making Ahichhatrapur(Nagaur) his capital.
- 556 AD The state of Guhil dynasty was established by Guhil in Mewar.
- 631 AD Chach of Aror of Sindh attacked Chittor.
- 7th century AD: Chavda dynasty establish its rule in south Rajasthan with its capital at Bhinmal.
- 700 AD Chinese traveler visits a few cities in Rajasthan
- 725 AD: Bappa Rawal defeats Arabs and captures the Chittor Fort from them.
- 728 AD: Bappa Rawal establish Mewar dynastry at Chittor Garh
- 720s AD: Ajayraja II of Chauhan dynasty established City of Ajmer.
- 738 AD: Nagabhata I, the founder of Pratihar dynasty defeated an Arab army.
- 967 Alan Singh Chanda of Chanda dynasty established city of Amber
- 971 AD: Vigraharaja II sits on the throne of Shakambhari
- 1010 Dulha Rai captures Khoh defeating Alan Singh Chanda
- 1018 Mahmud Ghazni attacks
- 1031 Vimalshah constructs Dilwara temple
- 1113 Ajay raj II shifted his capital to Ajaymeru(Ajmer) from Shakambhari
- 1137 Kakil Deo captures Amber
- 1156 Rao Jaisal Singh establishes Jaisalmer state
- 1178 Muhammad Ghori defeated in Battle of Kashadra near Mount Abu by Chaulukyas (Solanki) of Gujarat with the help of Chauhans of Nadol, Jalore and Parmaras of Chandravati.
- 1191 First Battle of Tarain, Prithviraj Chauhan defeats Muhammad Ghori
- 1192: Defeat of Rajputs Under Prithviraj and Gaur rajput dynasty (Sarwar, Kekri, Fatehgarh) in Taraori leading to large scale destruction of their powers.
- 1198: Gaur rajput dynasty ruled the Ajmer for some years .
- 1230 Tejpal and Vastupal build Neminath temples at Dilwara
- 1234 Rawal Jait Singh of Mewar defeats Iltutmish
- 1301 Alauddin Khalji captures Ranthambhor defeating Hammirdeva
- 1303 Chittorgarh falls to Khilji, Rani Padmini's Jauhar
- 1311 Khilji defeats Kanhadadeva and captures Jalore
- 1326 Rana Hammir re takes Chittorgarh
- 1433 Maharana Kumbha becomes king
- 1439 Maharana Kumbha build Vijay Stambha
- 1459 Rao Jodha founded Jodhpur
- 1465 Rao Bika set up Bikaner
- 1517 Rana Sanga defeated combined Muslim forces of Malwa and Gujarat in Gagron and conquered Malwa (Central India) and made Medini Rai king of Malwa with Chanderi as his capital.
- 1519 Rana Sanga defeated Afghans of Ibrahim Lodhi Multiple times and freed most of Present Day Rajasthan.
- 1527 Coalition of Rajput Prince defeated by Babur in Khanua led by Sanga ending supremacy of Rajputs Sanga established in last 10 years.
- 1544 Battle at Jaitaran between Raja Maldeo and Sher Shah Suri
- 1559 Udaipur is founded by Maharana Udaisingh
- 1567 Chittor besieged by Akbar
- 1568 Chittor ravaged by Akbar and placed under the charge of Asaf Khan.
- 1576 Battle of Haldighati where the Mughal forces defeated Maharana Pratap.
- 1606 Battle of Dewair, Mughal forces under Asaf Khan was defeated by Maharana Amar Singh.
- 1727 Sawai Jai Singh II founded city of Jaipur
- 1733 Maharaja Suraj Mal establishes Jat state at Bharatpur
- 1818 Many rulers signed treaties with East India Company
- 1857 first independence movement, Nasirabad
- Rajputana famine of 1869
- 1949 Heera Lal Shastri becomes the chief minister
- 1956 Rajasthan state reorganised

== See also ==
- History of Rajasthan
- List of dynasties and rulers of Rajasthan
