= Jaswant Singh of Bharatpur =

Maharaja of Bharatpur from 1853 to 1893

Jashwant Singh
- Maharaja
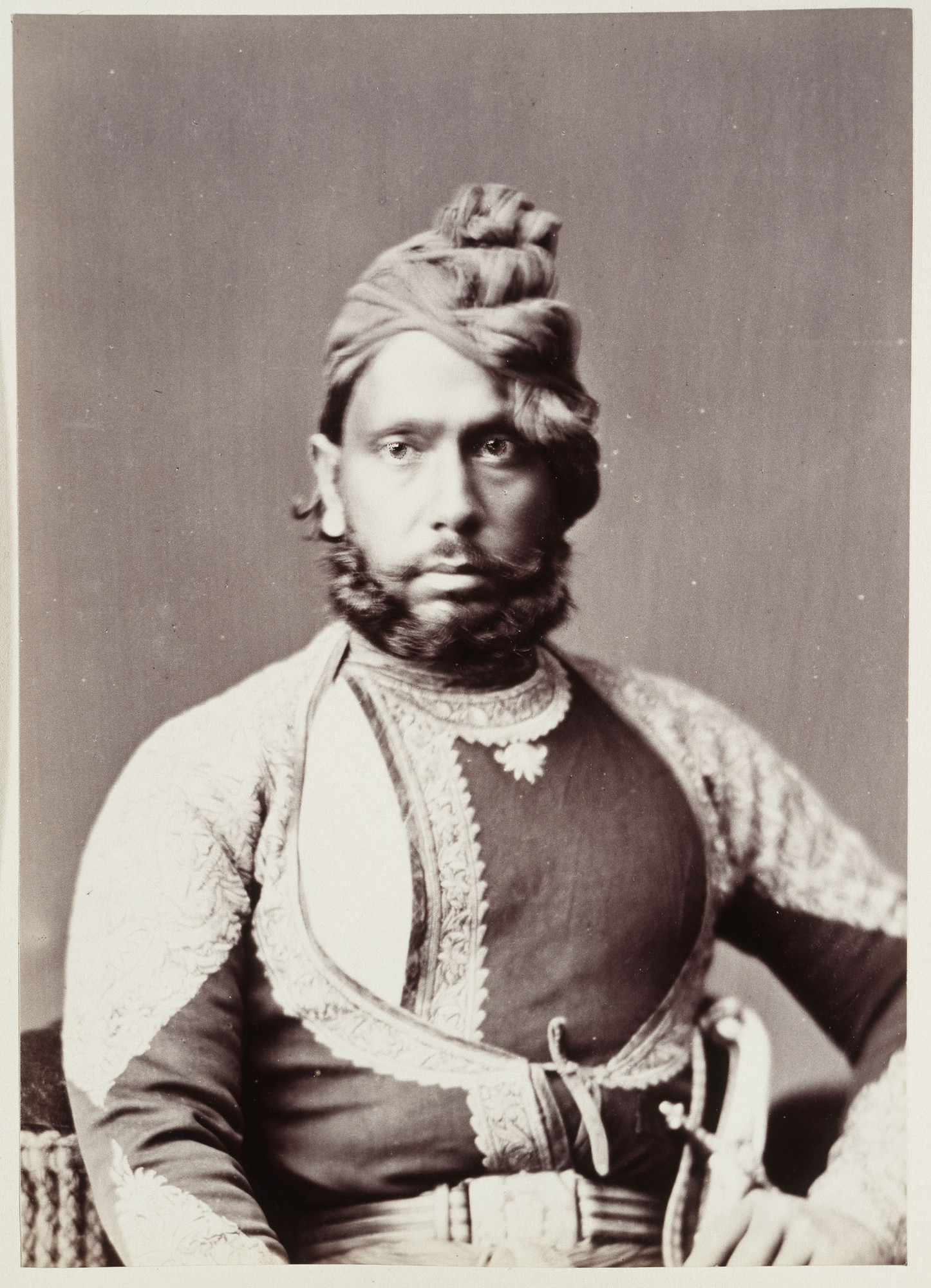
- Formal portrait, c. 1870s–1880s

Maharaja of Bharatpur
- Reign: 21 March 1853 – 12 December 1893
- Coronation: 8 July 1853 (first); 10 June 1869 (second); 28 March 1872 (third)
- Predecessor: Balwant Singh
- Successor: Ram Singh
- Born: 1 March 1851; Deeg, Bharatpur, Rajasthan, Bharatpur State (present-day Rajasthan, India)
- Died: 12 December 1893 (aged 42); Deeg, Bharatpur, Rajasthan, Bharatpur State (present-day Rajasthan, India)
- House: Sinsinwar
- Father: Balwant Singh
- Religion: Hinduism

Maharaja Jashwant Singh (Hindi pronunciation: [məɦaːˈraːd͡ʒa d͡ʒəʃˈʋənt̪ sɪŋɦ]; 1 March 1851 – 12 December 1893) was the ruler of the princely state of Bharatpur from 1853 to 1893 in Rajasthan, India. His successor was Maharaja Ram Singh.

== Early life ==
Jaswant Singh was born at Deeg on 1 March 1851. He was the only son of Maharaja Balwant Singh. He was educated privately. He had knowledge of the Hindi, English and Persian languages.

== Ascension ==
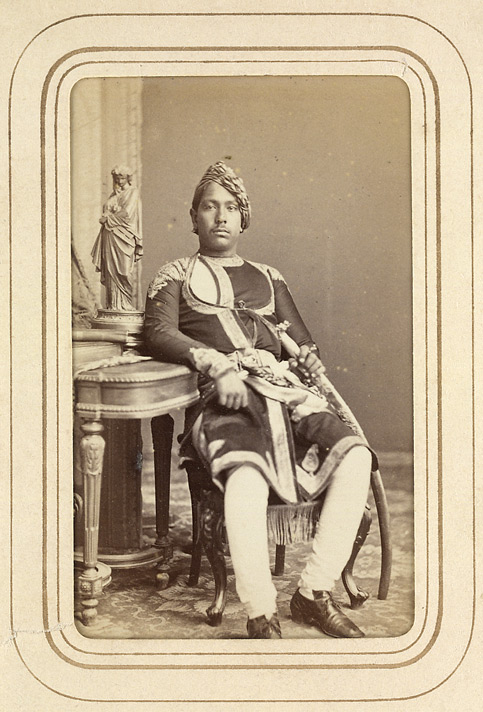
Photograph of Jaswant Singh by Bourne & Shepherd, 1870

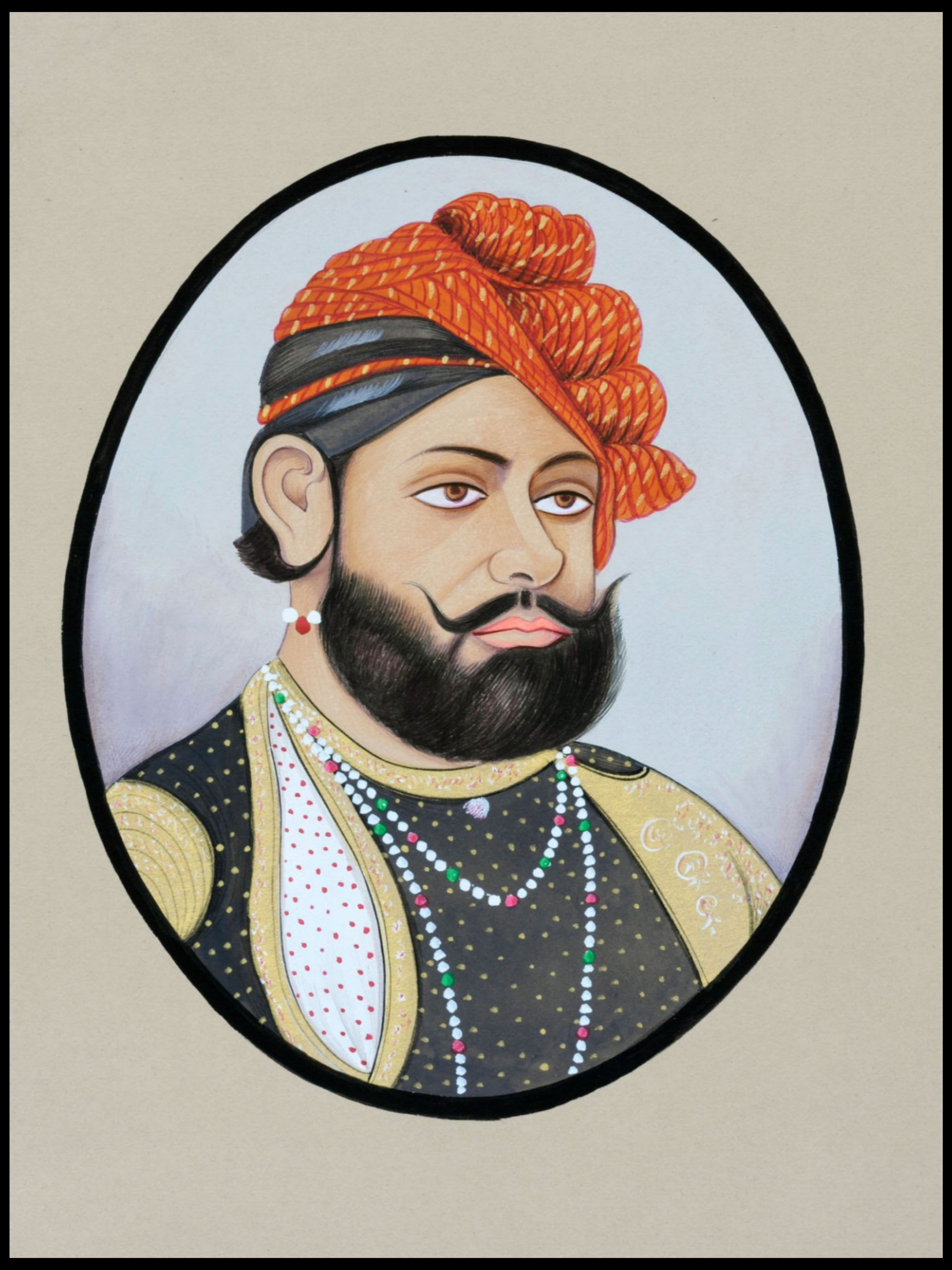
Portrait of Jaswant Singh

Jaswant Singh succeeded on the death of his father on 21 March 1853. He ascended the throne on 8 July 1853, reigning under a Council of Regency until he came of age. He assumed limited ruling powers on 10 June 1869 and was invested with full ruling powers on 28 March 1872.

== Death and succession ==
He died at the Deeg Palace on 12 December 1893, having had issue, four sons and three daughters. His successor was Maharaja Ram Singh. One of his wives was Basant Kaur, the daughter of Maharaja Narinder Singh of Patiala.

== Name and titles ==
His official full name and title was: His Highness Shri Yadukul Maharaja Jaswant Singh, 11th Maharaja of Bharatpur, GCSI.
