= Brijendra Singh =

Last ruling Maharaja of Bharatpur from 1929–1947

Maharaja Brijendra Singh
- Maharaja of Bharatpur
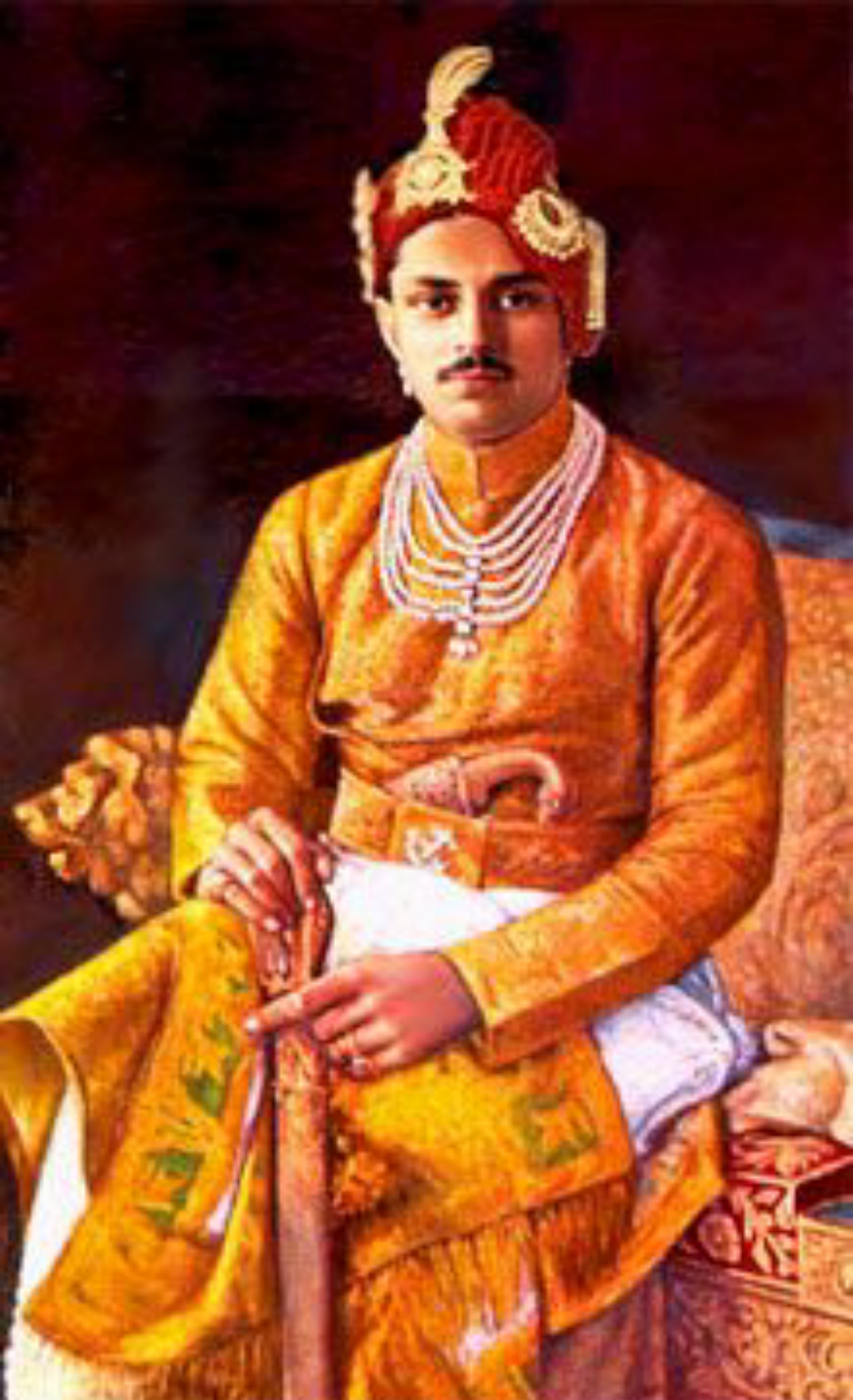
- Maharaja Brijendra Singh
- Reign: 14 April 1929 – 15 August 1947
- Predecessor: Maharaja Kishan Singh
- Successor: Vishvendra Singh (titular)
- Born: 1 December 1918
- Died: 8 July 1995 (aged 76)
- Spouse: Maharani Chamunda Ammani Avaru, Maharani Videh Kaur (div. 1972)
- Issue: Vishvendra Singh
- House: Sinsiniwar Jat Dynasty
- Father: Maharaja Kishan Singh
- Mother: Maharani Rajendra Kaur

Maharaja Brijendra Singh (1 December 1918 – 8 July 1995) was the last ruler of the princely state of Bharatpur from 14 April 1929 to 15 August 1947, and the successor of Maharaja Kishan Singh.

== Early life ==
Maharaja was born at Savar Mahal, Bharatpur on 1 February 1918. He was the eldest son of Maharaja Kishan Singh by his wife Maharani Rajendra Kaur. He was educated at Bryanston and Wellington.

== Ascendancy ==
Maharaja Brijendra Singh succeeded to the throne on the death of his father on 27 March 1929, ascended the throne on 14 April 1929 and reigned under the Council of Regency until he came of age. He was invested with ruling powers on 22 October 1939. He signed the instrument of accession to the Dominion of India in August 1947. He merged his state into the Matsya Union on 18 March 1948, which was subsequently absorbed into state of Rajasthan on 15 May 1949.

== Marriage ==
He was first married on 18 June 1941 at the Amba Vilas Palace, Mysore to Maharani Jaya Chamunda Ammani Avaru, who was the third daughter of Yuvaraja Kanteerava Narasimharaja Wadiyar and the sister of Maharaja Jayachamaraja Wodeyar, the last ruling Maharaja of Mysore. He was married a second time at Bharatpur in June 1961 (div. 1972) to Maharani Videh Kaur.

== Political career ==
He was a Member of Parliament (Lok Sabha) 1962–1971. He was deprived of his royal rank, titles and honours by the Government of India on 28 December 1971.

== Death ==
He died on 8 July 1995, with his sole successor being Vishvendra Singh.
