= Dhar (guerrilla warfare) =

Guerrilla warfare tactic used in India in the 1680s

Dhar or Dhad is a militia, often engaging in guerrilla warfare tactics, used in Indian history. It was used by several castes and ethnic groups throughout history.

== History ==
=== Dhars during Medieval era ===
Different North Indian communities would organize resistance against aggressors throughout the Indian medieval age.

The Jats of Sindh and Multan would offer resistance against Mahmud of Ghazni, harassing and inflicting many casualties on his loot-laden army on their march back to Ghazni. Mahmud would regroup, confront and defeat the Jats.

The famous Rajput king, Maharana Pratap of the Kingdom of Mewar, engaged in guerrilla warfare against the Mughals. His tactics would later influence Malik Ambar and the Marathas.

Historically, Khaps would raise militias to secure their own interests, often pushing for autonomy and threatening revolt if their demands were not met. During the reign of Akbar, the Mughal government would grant many concessions to prominent Jat Khaps in exchange for their support of the new tax reforms. During the reign of Aurangzeb, discriminatory policies against Hindus would push the Jats to revolt under the leadership of Gokula Jat. However, the revolt was quickly crushed. Rajaram would reorganize the Jats and lead another revolt, avoiding direct battles with larger Mughal forces and focusing on swift, surprise attacks. Rajaram's revolt would also be put down, but it paved the way for the Bharatpur State.

=== Dhars during Partition Violence ===
During the Partition of India, Hindu dhars armed themselves and targeted local Muslims. In Mewat and its environs, Hindus of many different castes actively targeted the Muslim Meos. The forces of different princely states, such as Alwar and Bharatpur, would also incite and support rioting Hindus in expelling Muslims from their state.

== See also ==
- Jathas, militia organization used by Sikhs
