= Kishan Singh of Bharatpur =

Maharaja of Bharatpur from 1918 to 1929

King Kishan Singh I
- Maharaja of Bharatpur
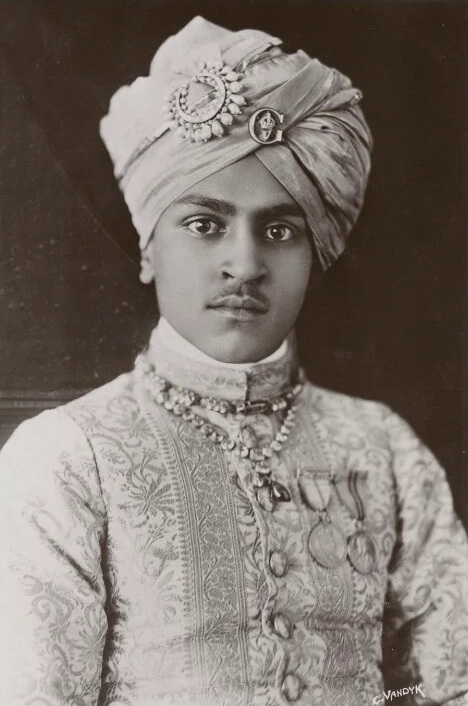
- Portrait, 1910s

King of Bharatpur
- Reign: 27 August 1900 – 27 March 1929
- Predecessor: King Ram Singh I
- Successor: King Brijendra Singh I
- Regent: Queen Giriraj Kaur (1900–1918)
- Born: 4 October 1899; Moti Mahal
- Died: 27 March 1929 (aged 29); Agra
- Spouse: Princess Rajendra Kaur of Faridokt
- Issue: Brijendra Singh I of Bharatpur; Raja Bachchu Singh
- House: Sinsiniwar Jat Dynasty
- Father: Ram Singh I of Bharatpur
- Mother: Giriraj Kaur

Maharaja Sir Kishan Singh, KCSI (1899–1929) was a ruler of the princely state of Bharatpur. Singh was a supporter of the Arya Samaj and its Shuddhi movement, which aimed at reconverting individuals to Hinduism. With the backing of royal courts like his, the Hindu Mahasabha and the Rashtriya Swayamsevak Sangh (RSS) gained prominence. V. D. Savarkar of the Mahasabha actively pursued a strategy of engaging with Hindu rulers. During his reign, Kishan Singh replaced Nastaliq with Nagari as the official script and prohibited the teaching of Urdu and Persian in state schools.

== Early life ==
Maharaja Kishan Singh was born at Moti Mahal, Bharatpur on 4 October 1899 in a Jat family. He was eldest son of Maharaja Ram Singh by his second wife, Maharani Girraj Kaur. He was educated at Mayo College, Ajmer and Wellington.

His father was deposed in 1900, and his mother served as regent for her son until he assumed full powers in November 1918.

He was taken by his mother to attend the Delhi Durbars of 1903 and 1911.

Kishan Singh of Bharatpur Sinsinwar Jat Dynasty Born: 1899 Died: 27 March 1929
Regnal titles
Preceded by Maharani Girraj Kaur	Maharaja of Bharatpur; 1918–1929 AD	Succeeded by Maharaja Brijendra Singh
