= Ram Singh of Bharatpur =

Maharaja of Bharatpur from 1893 to 1900

Maharaja Ram Singh
- Maharaja of Bharatpur
- Reign: 12 December 1893 – 10 August 1900
- Predecessor: Jaswant Singh
- Successor: Kishan Singh
- Born: 21 September 1873; Bharatpur, Rajasthan, British India
- Died: 1929 (aged 56); Agra, Delhi, British India
- Spouse: Maharani Girraj Kaur
- Issue: Kishan Singh
- House: Sinsiniwar Jat Dynasty
- Father: Jaswant Singh
- Mother: Maharani Darya Kaur

Maharaja Ram Singh Kaiser-i-Hind (1873 – 1929) was the ruling Maharaja of the princely state of Bharatpur (1893–1900) and the successor of Maharaja Jaswant Singh. His ruling powers were suspended on 10 August 1900 after the murder of one of his personal servants after which he was exiled to Agra. He was succeeded by his wife Maharani Girraj Kaur who was the regent for her son Kishan Singh from 27 August 1900 to 28 November 1918 until he came of age.

== Early life ==
He was born at Lohagarh, Bharatpur in British India on 21 September 1873, the second son of Maharaja Jashwant Singh by his second wife, Maharani Darya Kaur. He succeeded to the throne after the death of his father on 12 December 1893. He ascended the gadi on 25 December 1893.
