= Badan Singh =

Raja of Bharatpur from 1722 to 1755

- Raja
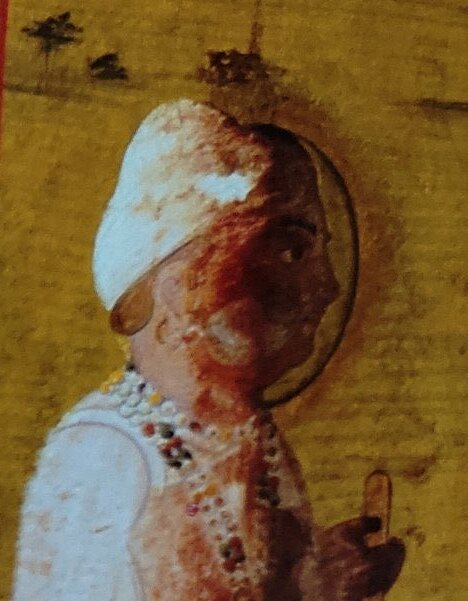
- Portrait of Raja Badan Singh

Raja of Bharatpur
- Reign: 18 November 1722 – 21 May 1755
- Predecessor: Muhkam Singh
- Successor: Maharaja Suraj Mal
- Died: 21 May 1755; Deeg
- House: Sinsinwar Dynasty
- Father: Roop Singh
- Religion: Hinduism

Maharaja Badan Singh (reigned 18 November 1722 – 21 May 1755) was the formal founder and first Maharaja of the Bharatpur state from 1722 to 1755. He was a nephew of Churaman Singh. After Churaman's death on 20 September 1721 there were family disputes between Badan Singh and Churaman's son Muhkam Singh. Badan Singh aligned with Jai Singh II of Jaipur to avoid the wrath of Muhkam Singh. In this family feud, Jai Singh supported Badan Singh.

== Early life ==
Badan Singh was born to a Hindu Jat family to Roop Singh who was the jagirdar of Deeg, Rajasthan. He was the nephew of Rao Churaman Singh, then the chief of Thun stronghold.

== Ancestors ==
The Hindu Jat rulers of Bharatpur kingdom and Braj claim descent from Lord Shri Krishna and indirect relationship with jadaun family of karauli kingdom.One of their ancestor was Shobha Singh who held his sway over Bayana, he attacked the modern-day Sinsini region and defeated the native tribe of Kalal Chandars.

== Architecture ==
G.C. Dwivedi writes: Badan Singh Jat had some aesthetic sense and a taste for architecture too, which is testified by the remains of his numerous buildings and garden-palaces. He beautified the fort of Deeg with handsome palaces, which are known as the Purana Mahal.

At Weir in the Bayana district, he planted within the fort a large garden with a beautiful house and reservoirs in the centre, now called Phul-bari.

He also built palaces at Kamar as well as at Sahar, which are now in ruin, and dedicated a temple at Brindaban, known by the poetic name of Dhir Samir.

Badan Singh lived to a ripe old age, which he spent in happy retirement at Sahar, leaving the management of his State to his most capable son Suraj Mal. He died on 21 May 1755 with the usual suspicion of him being poisoned, though there were no imaginable grounds for this.

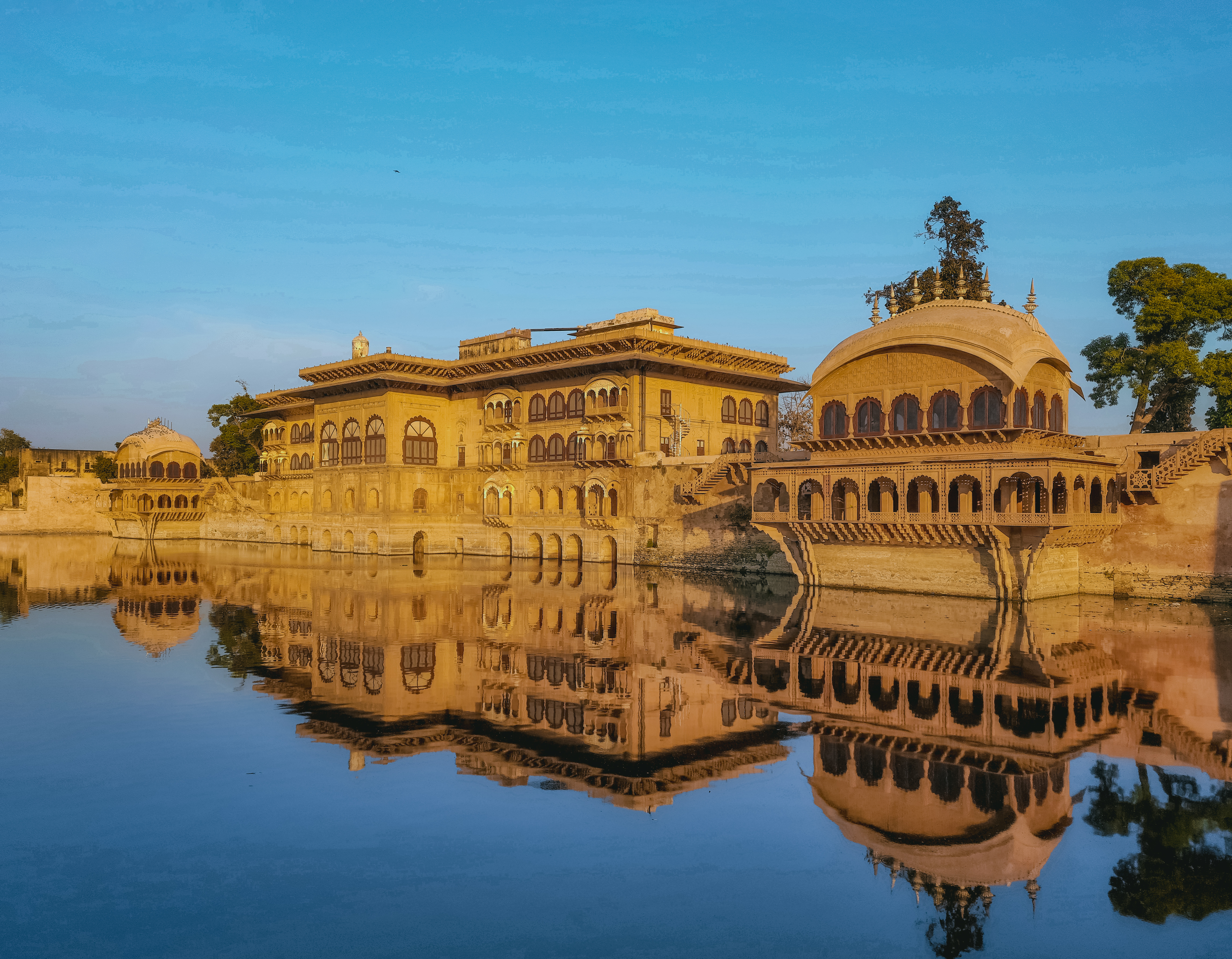
Gopal Bhawan palace, Deeg fort built by Raja Badan Singh

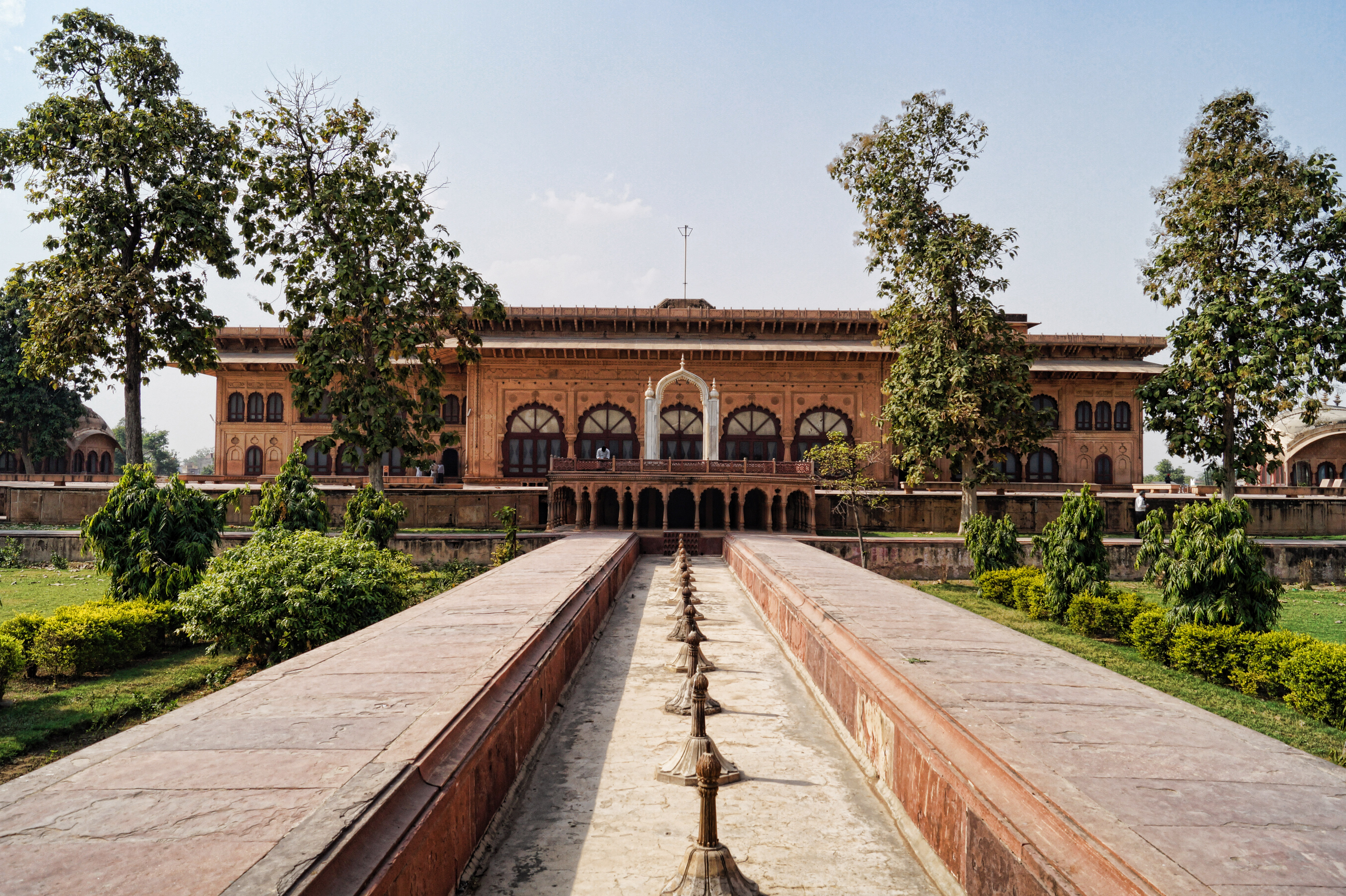
Inside view of Deeg fort

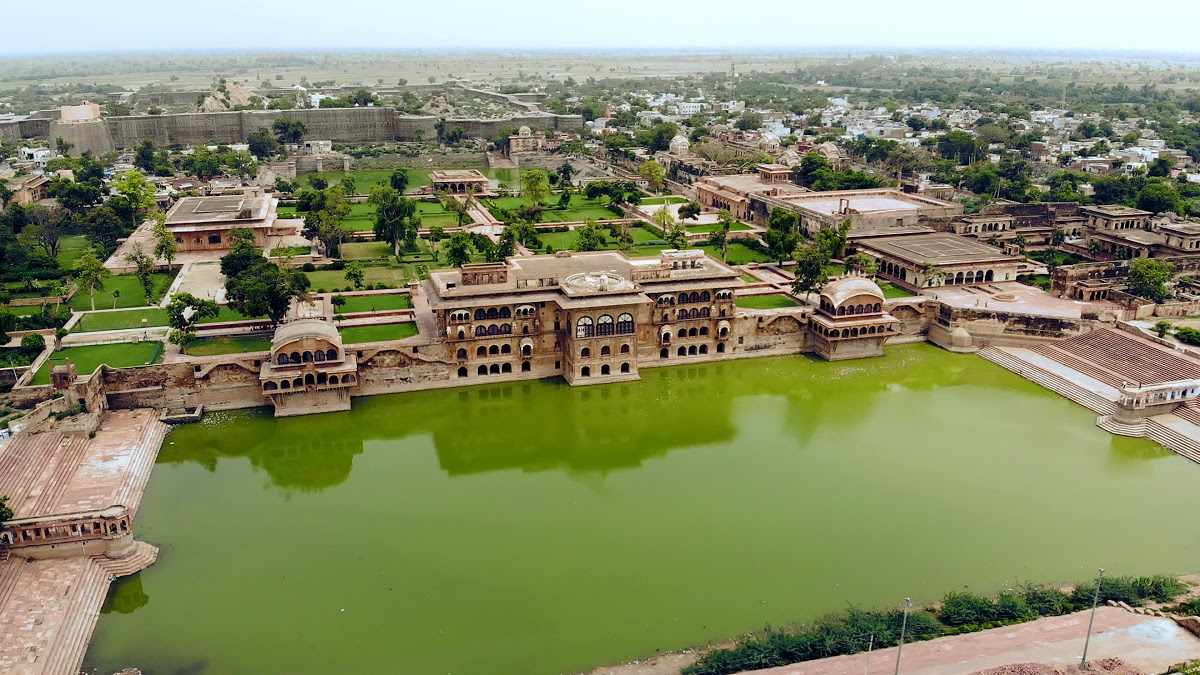
Deeg fort

== Raja Muhkam Singh's downfall ==
After the death of Rao Churaman Singh, his successor Raja Muhkam Singh became unpopular among the Sinsinwar clan. In 1722, he was challenged by Badan Singh(cousin), the chief of Deeg. A joint military campaign led by Jai Singh II of Jaipur and Badan Singh forced Muhkam Singh to abandon the fort of Thun in November 1722. Muhkam fled to Jodhpur, where he secured the protection of the Maharaja of Jodhpur by paying for his defense. Although the Mughals sent a force to capture him, the Maharaja of Jodhpur intervened and safeguarded Muhkam. Following this, Jai Singh II formally recognized Badan Singh as the 'Thakur of Bharatpur'.

— Jadunath Sarkar and Raghubir Sinh, A History of Jaipur: c. 1503–1938, Orient Longman, 1984, pp. 170–171.

== Military career ==
Battle of Mandu (1729)

Raja Badan Singh was an ally of Jai Singh II of Jaipur. Jai Singh was given the Subedari of Malwa in October 1729, then he attacked Marathas at Mandu. Jai Singh asked for Raja Badan Singh's help and the Jat army proceeded towards Mandu town under the leadership of prince Sujan Singh (later known as Maharaja Surajmal) and helped the Jaipur forces to capture Mandu.

Battle of Bhopal (1737)

Jai Singh II sent his army against Peshwa Bajirao and Raja Badan Singh also sent an army for Jai Singh's help under his son and the Raja of Weir- Pratap Singh. In an engagement Jat army of Raja Pratap Singh defeated Bajirao, mentioned by contemporary poet Sudan

Battle of Gangwana (1741)

Jat forces under the leadership of Raja Badan Singh defeated Rajputs under Bakht Singh Rathore of Jodhpur with Jai Singh II.
