= Churaman =

Chieftain of Sinsini from 1695 to 1721

Raja Churaman Singh
- Chieftain of Sinsini
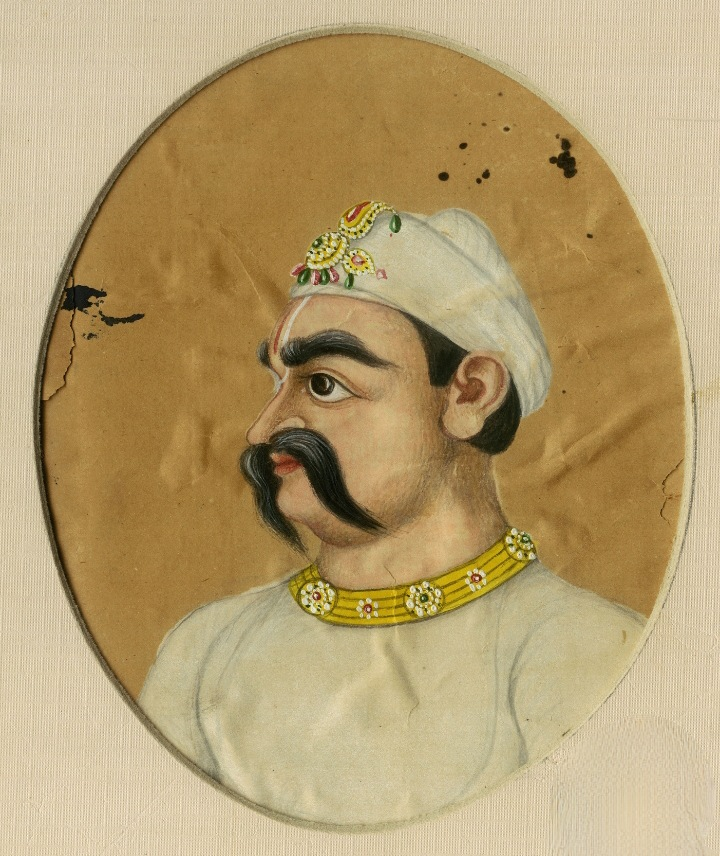
- Portrait of Raja Churaman Singh
- Reign: 1695–20 September 1721
- Predecessor: Raja Ram Sinsinwar
- Successor: Muhkam Singh
- Died: 20 September 1721
- Issue: Muhkam Singh
- House: Sinsinwar
- Father: Bhajja/Bhagwant Singh
- Religion: Hinduism

Churaman (died 20 September 1721) was a chieftain from Sinsini, Rajasthan, who rose to prominence as a leader following the death of his brother Raja Ram. He established the rule mainly centred at Bharatpur, during the decline of the Mughal Empire. Initially a highwayman, Churaman organized plundering expeditions and built a fortified base at Bharatpur. After supporting Bahadur Shah I in the Mughal succession war against Muhammad Azam Shah in 1707, he was appointed a mansabdar and later served as the faujdar of Mathura, overseeing the imperial highway from Delhi to Agra. His strategic alliances, including with the Sayyid brothers, and opportunistic betrayals during Mughal conflicts strengthened his power. Churaman died in 1721 after consuming poison during a family dispute, leaving his nephew Badan Singh to succeed him as formal founder of the Bharatpur State.

== Early life and Rise to power ==
Churaman was the younger brother of Rajaram Jat and a son of Bhajja Singh of Sinsini, Bharatpur. Following the death of Rajaram, leadership of the Jats passed to their father, Bhajja Singh, who faced challenges from Mughal forces intent on suppressing Jat resistance. In the late 1680s, Bishan Singh Kachhwah, the new Raja of Amber (Jaipur), was appointed by the emperor Aurangzeb as faujdar of Mathura with the task of rooting out the Jats and capturing Sinsini as his own jagir. Bishan Singh, eager to emulate the achievements of his father Ram Singh and grandfather Mirza Raja Jai Singh, gave a written undertaking to demolish the fort of Sinsini.

The Mughal campaign against Sinsini, led by Bidar Bakht, was arduous. The besieging army faced severe hardships due to scarcity of provisions and water, as the Jats disrupted grain convoys and watering parties with frequent attacks. Night raids kept the Mughal camp in constant alarm, and hunger and exhaustion led to significant losses, particularly among the animals. Despite these challenges, the Mughals persisted, advancing their trenches to the fort's gate over four months, mounting guns on raised platforms, and laying mines. An initial mine explosion failed due to Jat countermeasures, killing many Mughal artillerymen. However, a second mine was successfully detonated by the end of January 1690, breaching the wall and allowing the Mughals to storm the fort after intense fighting. The Jats suffered heavy losses, with 1,500 men killed, while the Mughals lost 200 soldiers and saw 700 Rajputs killed or wounded. The remaining Jat garrison was executed.

The following year, on 21 May 1691, Raja Bishan Singh surprised the Jat stronghold of Sogar. Taking advantage of an open gate used for grain delivery, the Mughal forces swiftly entered, killing those who resisted and capturing 500 rebels. These defeats forced the surviving Jat leaders into hiding, and the tribe temporarily returned to agriculture, bringing peace to the region for a few years.

After these setbacks and the death of his father, Bhajja Singh, Churaman assumed leadership of the Jats. According to historian J.N. Sarkar, Churaman possessed a character that blended “the stubbornness of a Jat with the cunning and political sagacity of a Maratha”. He began his career as a highwayman, leading a gang that plundered caravans and wayfarers. The author of Imad-us-Saadat notes that he quickly gathered a force of 500 horsemen and 1,000 footmen, later joined by Nanda Jat with an additional 100 horsemen. As his resources grew, Churaman shifted from looting caravans to plundering entire parganas (administrative units). To secure his gains, he constructed a fortified refuge in a marshy, wooded area 48 kos (approximately 96 miles) from Agra, which he later developed into the mud fort of Bharatpur.

By the time his army expanded to 14,000 men, Churaman had established Bharatpur as a key base, leaving a trusted subordinate in charge while he led plundering expeditions toward Kota and Bundi. Around 1704, he briefly recovered Sinsini from Mughal control but lost it again in October 1705.

== Role in Mughal politics ==
Churaman's rise coincided with the decline of the Mughal Empire, particularly after Emperor Aurangzeb's death in 1707. During the succession war between Bahadur Shah and Azam at Jajau (1707), Churaman positioned himself strategically, aligning with the victor, Bahadur Shah. His forces plundered the camp of the defeated Azam, securing a rich booty and earning a *mansab* (military rank) of 500 horse from Bahadur Shah. He invested his wealth in fortifying Bharatpur, recruiting soldiers, and conciliating enemies, while serving Bahadur Shah loyally during campaigns to Lahore in 1711 and the subsequent succession battles among the emperor's sons in 1712.

Under the weak rule of Jahandar Shah (1712–1713), Churaman exploited the Mughal court's instability, retiring to his estates to amass resources. When Farrukh-siyar marched against Jahandar Shah in 1713, Churaman nominally joined the emperor's forces but betrayed him by plundering the imperial baggage during the battle near Agra, contributing to Jahandar Shah's defeat.

== Relations with Farrukh-siyar and the Sayyid Brothers ==
After Farrukh-siyar's ascension, Churaman initially resisted Mughal authority, capitalizing on the emperor's weak leadership. Efforts by Chabela Ram, the subahdar of Agra, to subdue him failed, and Samsam-ud-daulah (Khan-i-Dauran), the next governor, opted for conciliation. Churaman was pardoned and summoned to court, where he was appointed to oversee the royal highway from Delhi to the Chambal River. This position allowed him to levy tolls, which he collected with such harshness that it provoked widespread complaints. His actions effectively legalized his plundering, as he behaved as the de facto ruler of the region.

The growing Jat power alarmed Rajah Jai Singh of Jaipur, a traditional rival of the Jats. In 1716, Jai Singh led a campaign against Churaman, besieging his stronghold at Thun. Despite a prolonged siege lasting twenty months, Churaman's defenses, bolstered by supplies and local allies, held firm. Court intrigues and the influence of the Sayyid brothers, who opposed Jai Singh, led to Churaman's pardon in exchange for a tribute of 30 lakhs to the imperial treasury and 20 lakhs to the wazir, Sayyid Abdullah.

Churaman became a key ally of the Sayyid brothers, who dominated Mughal politics after deposing Farrukh-siyar in 1719. He supported their campaigns, including the siege of Agra against the pretender Neku-siyar, where his influence facilitated the fort's surrender. However, Churaman's loyalty was opportunistic; when Sayyid Husain Ali was murdered in 1720, he accepted rewards to join Muhammad Shah's forces, guiding the emperor's army through rival territories to avoid his own. During the battle against Sayyid Abdullah at Hodal in November 1720, Churaman plundered both sides’ baggage, securing significant loot before retreating to Bharatpur.

== Military campaigns and leadership ==
In 1702 after the death of his father Bhajja Singh, Raja Churaman Singh came to the fore. Within a short period Raja Churaman Singh gathered 500 horsemen and thousands of soldiers. Nand Ram, the Zamindar of Hathras, joined him along with 100 horsemen. Raja Churaman Singh recruited a well-known brigand of Mendoo and Mursan to his army. He constructed a fort at Thoon, 150 kilometres west of Agra, near Bharatpur in modern-day Rajasthan, India. Within a short span there were 80 villages under the Thoon state and an army of 14 – 15 thousand.
