= Sinsini =

Sinsini Sinsani
- village
- Location in Rajasthan, India Sinsini (India)
- Coordinates: 27°22′N 77°17′E
- Country: India
- State: Rajasthan

Government
  - Body: Gram panchayat

Languages
  - Official: Hindi
- Time zone: UTC+5:30 (IST)
- ISO 3166 code: RJ-IN

Sinsini is a historic village located in the Bharatpur district of Rajasthan, India, approximately 20 kilometers south of Deeg and 28 kilometers from Bharatpur. This village is known for its role in the Jat uprising against Mughal Empire during the late 17th and 18th centuries. Gokula, Raja Ram and Churaman were the chieftains of Sinsini and founded the Sinsini fort. With a population of 8,376 as per the 2011 Census, the village had a literacy rate of 70.23%.

== Fort of sinsini ==
Sinsini fort was a historical fort located near the village of Sinsini in Bharatpur district, Rajasthan. Constructed on a nearby hill, the fort was built by the Jats during their mid-17th century revolt against the Mughal Empire. It served as a strategic stronghold, particularly under the leadership of Gokula, Raja Ram, and Churaman, who used it as a base for organising resistance against Mughal forces. However, the fort was destroyed in 1690 by Mughal commander Bidar Bakht, after the death of Raja Ram.
