= Wair, Bharatpur district =

Coordinates: 28°21′N 77°42′E

Wai
- village
- Interactive map of Wai
- Country: India
- State: Rajasthan

Languages
  - Official: Hindi
- Time zone: UTC+5:30 (IST)
- Vehicle registration: RJ-
- Coastline: 0 kilometres (0 mi)

Wair is a village in Rajasthan, India. Wair's railway station code is WAIR, serving Wair Badshapur.

== See also ==
- Suraj Mal of Bharatpur
