= Sinsinwar =

Jat clan in India

Sinsinwar is an Indian clan of Jats mainly found in the state of Rajasthan, Uttar Pradesh, Madhya Pradesh, Haryana. The name Sinsinwar is derived from the village Sinsini in Bharatpur, Rajasthan. Rulers of the Bharatpur state belong to this clan such as Maharaja Suraj Mal.

== Etymology ==
The word Sinsinwar was originated from the name of village Sinsini, to which ancestral lineage of Bharatpur rulers belong.

== Mythological origin ==
The Sinsinwar rulers of the Bharatpur dynasty claimed their descent from Balchand, a Yaduvanshi Rajput of Jadaun clan. Balchand's wife was infertile, so he had two sons named Vijje and Sijje with a Jat concubine whom he had captured during one of his usual plundering raids. His sons became Jats and adopted Sinsinwar as their gotra based on the village of Sinsini after being rejected as Rajputs. Historian Ram Pande notes several issues when examining the veracity of this legend: Sinsini had never been part of Karauli State, the caste of a child is not based on the mother's caste, and they would have become Darogas when rejected as Rajputs instead of Jats. Ram Pande states that this legend was created "to show superiority of Sinsinwar Jats over other Jats".

== List of notable persons ==
This list includes some notable persons from Sinsinwar clan.

- Rajaram of Sinsini, chieftain of Sinsini in Bharatpur
- Badan Singh, Founder and first Maharaja of Bharatpur State
- Suraj Mal, Maharaja of Bharatpur State
- Vishvendra Singh, Indian politician and former cabinet minister in Government of Rajasthan
- Jawahar Singh, Maharaja of Bharatpur State
- Churaman, chieftain of Sinsini in Bharatpur

== See also ==
- Lohagarh Fort
- Deeg Palace
