= Hubli taluk =

- Interactive map of Hubli taluk
- Coordinates: 15°21′01″N 75°08′13″E
- Country: India
- State: Karnataka
- District: Dharwad district
- Headquarters: Hubli

Government
  - Type: Taluka Panchayat
  - Body: Hubli Taluka Panchayat

Area
  - Total: 623 km^{2} (241 sq mi)

Population (2021)
  - Total: 177,081
  - Density: 229/km^{2} (590/sq mi)

Hubli Taluka is a taluka located in Dharwad District of the Indian state of Karnataka.

== Village name and code ==
1. A. Timmasagar 602385
2. Adargunchi 602410
3. Agadi 602431
4. Amargol 602374
5. Anchatgeri 602406
6. B. Aralikatti 602427
7. Belegali 602418
8. Bengeri 602378
9. Bhairidevarakop 602375
10. Bhandiwad 602394
11. Bommapur 602384
12. Bommasamudra 602422
13. Budarsingi 602408
14. Byahatti 602389
15. Channapur 602413
16. Chavargudd 602414
17. Chebbi 602426
18. Devargudihal 602402
19. Gabbur 602386
20. Gangiwal 602405
21. Giriyal 602417
22. Gokul 602383
23. Gopankop 602377
24. Halyal 602396
25. Hebsur 602390
26. Inam-Veerapur 602416
27. Ingalhalli 602393
28. Kamplikop 602425
29. Karadikop 602423
30. Katnur 602412
31. Keshawpur 602380
32. Kirasur 602391
33. Koliwad 602400
34. Kotgondhunshi 602409
35. Kurdikeri 602424
36. Kusugal 602392
37. Malligwad 602401
38. Mantur 602395
39. Mavanur 602407
40. Murarhalli 602411
41. Nagarhalli 602397
42. Nagashettikop 602379
43. Nulvi 602419
44. Pale 602421
45. Palikop 602429
46. Parasapur 602403
47. Ramapur 602415
48. Rayanal 602404
49. Revadihal 602382
50. Sgerewad 602420
51. Shirguppi 602398
52. Sulla 602388
53. Tarihal 602381
54. Tirumalkoppa 602430
55. Umachigi 602399
56. Unkal 602376
57. Warur 602428
58. Yellapura 602387
