= Economy of Hubli =

Hubli-Dharwad is the second largest city, in terms of area and population, in Karnataka. It is one of the 49 Metropolitan clusters selected by McKinsey & Company as growth hotspots in India. It is the 2nd highest in Karnataka and 22nd for India in terms of bank deposits or income-tax. It is the nerve center for North Karnataka region. It is the fastest growing city after the capital, Bangalore and Mangalore. It is home to the Headquarters of South Western Railway, and the Hubli Division of SWR is one of the highest revenue generating railway divisions in India. The High Court Of Karnataka is situated at Belur (Valmi) in Hubli-Dharwad.The Agriculture Produce market at Amargol in Hubli is one of the largest markets in Asia and the cotton market is among the largest cotton markets in India. The city has earned the nickname of "Shikshana Kashi" due to the large number of educational Institutions. The city is home to 4 universities and 2 deemed universities, and also has over 200 colleges. The University of Agricultural Sciences and the Karnataka Universities are internationally acclaimed universities for the quality of research and teaching. The city is a major industrial center and the railway workshop setup in 1880 is one of the oldest workshops in India. It is also the largest holder of EMD locomotives of Indian Railway. The city is home to Tata Motors (Marcopolo), Hitachi Construction Equipments, Telcon and Sankalp Semiconductors, among others. Infosys is about to commence operations from Hubli with a campus of over 50 acres. Due to raising construction activity including malls and business centers in Hubli, Real Estate Companies also added lot to the economy.

== Industrial profile ==
The Hubli-Dharwad neighborhood is the third largest commercial and industrial hub of activities in the State of Karnataka, after Bangalore and Mangalore. It had been a home of textile units since ages. The British established the Southern Mahratta Spinning and Weaving Company in 1897, later known as the Bharat Mills and later again as The Mahadev Textile Mills.

Few of the earliest and the biggest indigenous business houses were established under the names of M/s N.A.Sirur Cotton Merchants, established in 1896, M/s G.N.Madiman and Sons, Merchants and Bankers in 1920, Desai and Company in 1939 have contributed immensely to the industrial development as well as promotion of trade and commerce in this region, especially between the world wars.

The great depression in the United States had a drastic effect on the trade in the region in 1929. Starting in the late 1960s Kirloskar Group established manufacturing units at Hubli, namely, the Mysore Kirloskar Ltd., Kirloskar Electric Company and the Kirloskar Warner Swasey Ltd., at Tarihal. The Akay Industries, BDK Group of Companies, Microfinish Group of Companies, Shree Sai Engineering Works, Universal Group of Companies, Sagun Copper Conductors Pvt. Ltd, etc. came to be established. BDK and Microfinish earned goodwill for themselves as reputed units for manufacturing industrial valves required for chemical refineries. The permanent closure of the industrial units like Kirloskar, etc. has strongly affected the engineering industry of this region. The Walchandnagar Groups TIWAC Industry was set up for manufacturing Alarm Clocks, Bhoruka Textiles was set up in 1981 for the manufacture of Synthetic Clothes.

A host of factors can be attributed to the industrial growth of this region. Karnatak State Financial Corporation (KSFC) with its divisional office at Hubli with branches at Hubli, Gadag and Haveri: the head office of CEDOK, i.e., Centre For Entrepreneurship Development of Karnataka, at Dharwad: Karnataka Material Testing & Research Centre at the industrial estate in Hubli and a material testing centre at Gadag set up by NKSSIA and Gadag Industrial Cooperative Society respectively for the purpose of providing testing facilities.

The Government of Karnataka has set up various institutions like District Industries Centre (DIC), Karnataka Small Scale Industries Development Corporation (KSSIDC), Small Industries Service Institute (SISI), Small Industries Development Corporation (SIDCO) and other organisations like Karnataka Chamber of Commerce and Industry (KCCI), North Karnataka Small Scale Industries Association (NKSSIA), etc., to address the issues and needs of its member industries.

The Karnataka Industrial Area Development Board has been instrumental in developing industrial areas at Lakamanhalli (7318 acres), Sattur (78 acres), Rayapur (200 acres), Tarihal (256 acres), Belur (2,150 acres), MTsagar (old Jangamarakoppa, 250 acres) and Gamanaghatti (280 acres). There are even upcoming industrial areas in Hubli in Mumighatti (950 acres), Itaghatti and Gokul. The Central Government has declared Belur Industrial Area as the "Growth Centre" and has been sponsoring the development of infrastructure including water supply scheme, captive power plant, etc. Most attractive incentives and concessions have been announced by the State Government for the industries that would come in the area of Growth centre.

Further, an electronic city is also being established in Dharwad along with Software Technology Park (STP). This would give impetus to high technology industries. As per the Govt. of Karnataka Prospective plan for Dharwad District (2001–2006), the potential industries likely to come up in this part of the region include food and beverages, textiles, wood and wood products, leather and leather products, rubber, plastic, chemical and chemical products, glass ceramics, basic metal and metal products, general engineering and machine parts, automobile and transport equipments, job work, repair, servicing and miscellaneous products.

== Small-scale industries ==
Hubli-Dharwad is the centre of small-scale industries and ancillary units. There are large number of small-scale industries in Hubli-Dharwad. The total number of small-scale industries in Dharwad is 2774 while there are 4933 small-scale industrial units in Hubli. In the small-scale sector the main products of manufacture are agro products, engineering products, machine tools, chemical and pharmaceutical products, industrial valves manufactured in Hubli meet the nation's major share of requirements.

== Industrial areas ==
There are 7 industrial estates / areas in Hubli –Dharwad city. The government has set up the following industrial estates in view of the potential for industrialization in the area.

- Belur Industrial Area
- Tarihal Industrial Area
- Lakamanahalli Industrial Area
- Sattur Industrial Area
- Rayapur Industrial Area
- Gokul Industrial area phase-1
- Gamanghatti industrial area
- Mariyana Timmasagar industrial area

And there are even upcoming industrial estates in hubli-dharward

- Mumighatti industrial area(by 2021)
- Itaghatti industrial area (by 2024) and
- Gokul industrial area phase -2 (by 2030)

== Agriculture ==
Important crops in Dharwad district are Jowar, maize, wheat, cotton, onions and rice are grown. The district also grows mangoes and bananas as horticultural produce. There are many subsidiary agricultural industries such as the production of puffed rice, beaten rice, and edible oils. Hubli is the main trading centre for agriculture produce. Farmers not only from Karnataka, but from elsewhere sell their produce here. Hubli has a large APMC market at Amargol located between Hubli and Dharwad. Hubli APMC is an important market for red chillies, onions, rice, cotton and jowar. Hubli-Dharwad city has many medium and small-sized industries producing engineering items, electrical goods and agricultural implements. There are several cotton spinning and ginning mills.
