= Agadi =

Agadi may refer to places in India:

- Agadi, Dharwad, Karnataka
- Agadi, Haveri, Karnataka
- Agadi, Uttara Kannada
