= 9th Regiment of Horse =

9th Regiment of Horse or 9th Horse may refer to:

- 7th Dragoon Guards, ranked as 9th Horse from 1690 to 1694
- Montagu's Carabineers (raised by John Montagu, 2nd Duke of Montagu), ranked as 9th Horse from 1745 to 1746
- 9th Deccan Horse
