= Kishori (Maharani) =

Maharani Kishori

- Born: Hodal
- Spouse: Suraj Mal
- Father: Chaudhary Kashi Ram King of Hodal Kingdom in present day Palwal

Maharani Kishori (fl. 18th century) was the wife of Maharaja Suraj Mal of Bharatpur in Rajasthan, India. She was from Hodal, a town in the modern day Palwal district of Haryana, near Mathura and Bharatpur. The house her husband built for her in Bharatpur is now a monument protected by the government of Rajasthan.

It is said the Maharaja was riding his elephant near Hodal when he saw an angry bull frightening people. Kishori was returning from the well with a pitcher on her head, and stepped onto the bull's bridle to control it. The Maharaja was impressed by her courage and beauty, and later sent his messenger to make an offer of marriage. They married in c. 1730.

Kishori is described as "a symbol of pride for the local populace" who "played the role of patron to the Bharatpur state for three generation[s]".

The Maharani Kishori Memorial College of Education in Hodal is named after her, as is the Maharani Kishori Devi Girls' School in Bikaner.

== See also ==
- Maharaja Suraj Mal
- Jawahar Singh
- Bharatpur State

== Sources ==
- Kalika Ranjan Qanungo: History of the Jats : Contribution to the History of Northern India (Up to the Death of Mirza Najaf Khan, 1782). Edited and annotated by Vir Singh. Delhi, Originals, 2003, ISBN 81-7536-299-5
- Dr. Prakash Chandra Chandawat: Maharaja Suraj Mal aur unka yug, Jaypal Agencies Agra, 1982
- Kunwar Natwar Singh: Maharaja Suraj Mal
