= Bairagarh =

Bairagarh may refer to:

- A suburb of the Bhopal city where the Bhopal airport is located
- Bairagarh Airport, the airport of Bhopal
- Bhopal Bairagarh, a railway station in Bhopal suburb
- Bairagarh, Berasia, a locality in the Berasia tehsil of Bhopal district; located near the Dungaria dam
