= 9th Horse (Deccan Horse) =

Regiment of the Indian Army

The Deccan Horse (9 Horse)
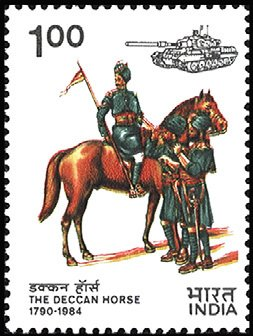
- Active: 1790–present
- Country: British India; India
- Branch: British Indian Army; Indian Army
- Type: Cavalry
- Size: Regiment
- Part of: Indian Armoured Corps
- Nickname: Deccan Horse
- Motto: संघे शक्ति (Sanghe Shakti)
- Equipment: Tanks
- Engagements: Second Afghan War 1879–1880; Burma War 1886–1888; China 1900
- Battle honours: Central India; Battle of Givenchy; Battle of the Somme; Battle of Bazentin; Battle of Delville Wood; Battle of Flers–Courcelette; Battle of Cambrai; France and Flanders 1914–18; Battle of Megiddo; Battle of Sharon; Capture of Damascus; Palestine 1918; Battle of Meiktilla; Rangoon Road; Burma Campaign 1944–45; Asal Uttar; Punjab 1965

Commanders
- Colonel of the Regiment: Lieutenant General Rajesh Pushkar
- Notable commanders: Gen AS Vaidya, Padma Vibhushan, PVSM, MVC & Bar, AVSM; Lt Gen RK Gulati, PVSM; Lt Gen AS Sandhu, PVSM; Lt Gen TS Shergill, PVSM; Lt Gen Aditya Singh, PVSM, AVSM**; Lt Gen RK Loomba PVSM, AVSM

The Deccan Horse or 9 Horse is one of the oldest and most decorated armoured regiments of the Indian Army. The Royal Deccan Horse (9th Horse), which was a regular cavalry regiment of the British Indian Army was formed from the amalgamation of two regiments after World War I. They saw service from the Mutiny of 1857 up to and including World War II.

== Formation ==
The 9th Royal Deccan Horse can trace its formation to 1790 when it was called Asif Sah's Irregular Cavalry. Two regiments were raised for service under the Nizam of Hyderabad in Berar, who was allied with the British East India Company.

During the following years, the titles of these two Regiments went through many changes. They were known by the following titles over the years:

- 1816: Nawab Jalal-ud-Daula's, Captains Davies' and Clerk's Risalas; 1826: 1st Regiment, Nizam's Cavalry; 1854: 1st Cavalry, Hyderabad Contingent; 1890: 1st Lancers, Hyderabad Contingent; 1903: 20th Deccan Horse; 1921: 20th Royal Deccan Horse
- 1816: Nawab Murtaza Yar Jang's, Captains Hallis' and Smith's Risalas; 1826: 2nd Regiment, Nizam's Cavalry; 1854: 2nd Cavalry, Hyderabad Contingent; 1890: 2nd Lancers, Hyderabad Contingent; 1903: 29th Lancers (Deccan Horse).

In 1903, during Kitchener's reform of the Indian Army, the 'Hyderabad Contingent' was incorporated into the regular British Indian Cavalry as the two regiments, the 20th Deccan Horse and 29th Lancers (Deccan Horse). In 1921, 20th Deccan Horse was given the title "Royal" for its distinguished service during World War I. In 1921, the two regiments were merged under the name "The 9th Royal Deccan Horse". In 1927, the designation was changed to "The Royal Deccan Horse (9th Horse)". The regimental class composition at the time of the Hyderabad Contingent was a squadron each of Sikhs, Deccani Mussalmans and Jats. In 1927, the composition was of Punjabi Muslims, Sikhs and Jats. On India becoming a Republic in 1950, the regiment's name was finally changed to "The Deccan Horse (9th Horse)".

== History ==
The Deccan Horse which remained a local corps in the Deccan, was frequently called for service during the 18th and 19th centuries. This included operations in the frontier to check the incursions of the Pindaris (1811), in Aurangabad against the Naiks in Central Berar (1817), the Third Anglo-Maratha War of 1817–18, sieges of Nowah and Umerkher in January 1819, in operations in the Raichur Doab (1819), against the Bhils in Kingaon, attack on the fort at Dandoti (1828), against Bhils in Lonar (1829), attack on the fort of Kaptak (1830), seizure of the fort in Nandgaon (1832), capture of the fort at Nanand (1833), against the Bhils at Jafferabad and Dhar, north of Jalna, against the Arabs near Afzalpur (1841), against the Rohillas at Warur and Bairugarh (1842), against the Rohillas near Nander and at the capture of the fort of Saorgaon (1842), against Bhils (1845–46), attack on the fort at Kandat (1847), in the quelling of a Rohilla rebellion and in the capture of the fort of Rai Mhow (1848), siege of Dharur (1851) and the siege of Sailur (1854).

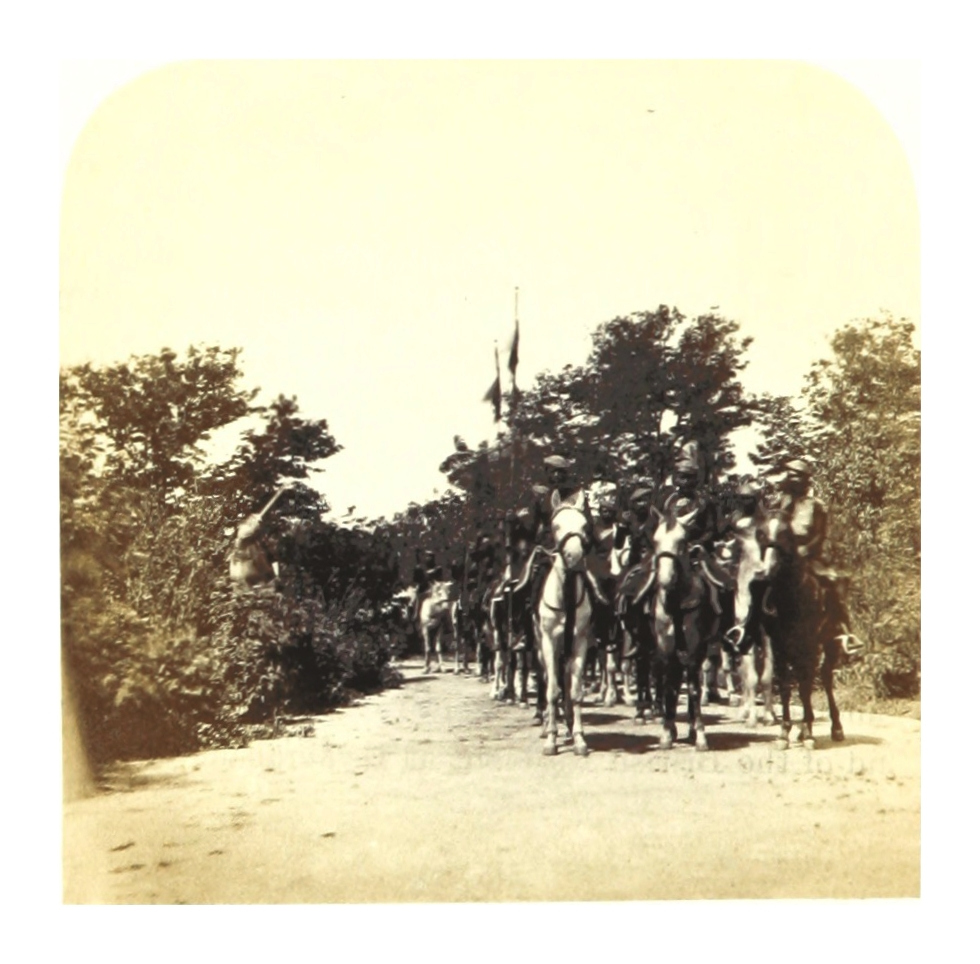
Irregular Cavalry of the Hyderabad Contingent, Mounted, 1862

Following the formation of the Hyderabad Contingent, the unit saw action in many locations around and after the Indian Rebellion of 1857 (Dhar, Jhansi, Piplia, Betwa River, Rawal, Banda, Mandesur, Kunch, Ratgarh, Kalpi, Madanpur, Bilawa, Chanderi, Gwalior and Garakota) winning a Victoria Cross (VC) in 1859 and was also awarded the battle honour, 'Central India' for its efforts in suppression of the mutiny in 1857–58.

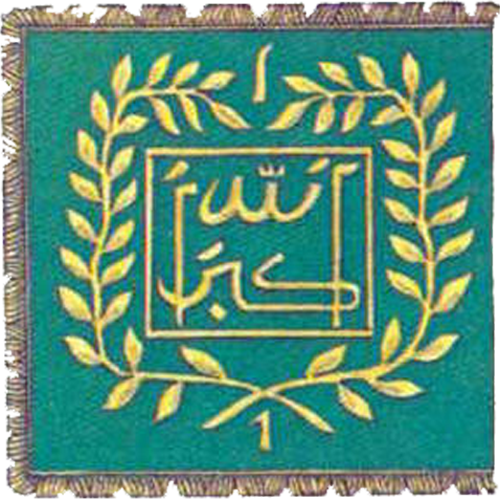
Standard of the 1st Lancers, Hyderabad Contingent

Officers and troops from the regiment took part in the Second Afghan War, Tirah campaign, Kurram Valley Field Force (1879–1880), the Burma War (1886–1888), in Central Africa (1891–1892), in the North-West Frontier expedition (1897–1898), in China during the Boxer Rebellion (1900) and in the South African War (1900–1901).

=== World War I ===
The 20th Deccan Horse was sent to France for service on the Western Front. The regiment was stationed in Bolarum before the war. It sailed from Bombay on board the SS Ellora and HMT Egra on 15 September 1914 to Marseille. It was part of the 9th (Secunderabad) Cavalry Brigade of the 2nd Indian Cavalry Division. The regiment remained in the vicinity or Marseille from 12 to 23 October 1914, following which it moved to Orléans. It moved to Vieille-Chapelle in November and saw fighting around Festubert in November and December 1914. It took part in the attack on Givenchy and took heavy casualties. The regiment remained behind the lines during most of 1915.

On 14 July 1916 during the Battle of Bazentin Ridge, part of the Battle of the Somme, the 20th Deccan with the 7th Dragoon Guards (the 9th (Secunderabad) Cavalry Brigade) were called forward to support the first attack on High Wood. Catching some German infantry in the open, they charged with lance and sword, killing 16 and capturing 32 Germans for the cost of 6 killed 45 wounded, with 12 horses killed and 52 wounded, mainly after the regiment had dismounted to hold the captured ground. They were withdrawn on the following morning, but the charge was given a favourable mention in Sir Douglas Haig's dispatches and received much coverage from the British press, anxious for some news of success.

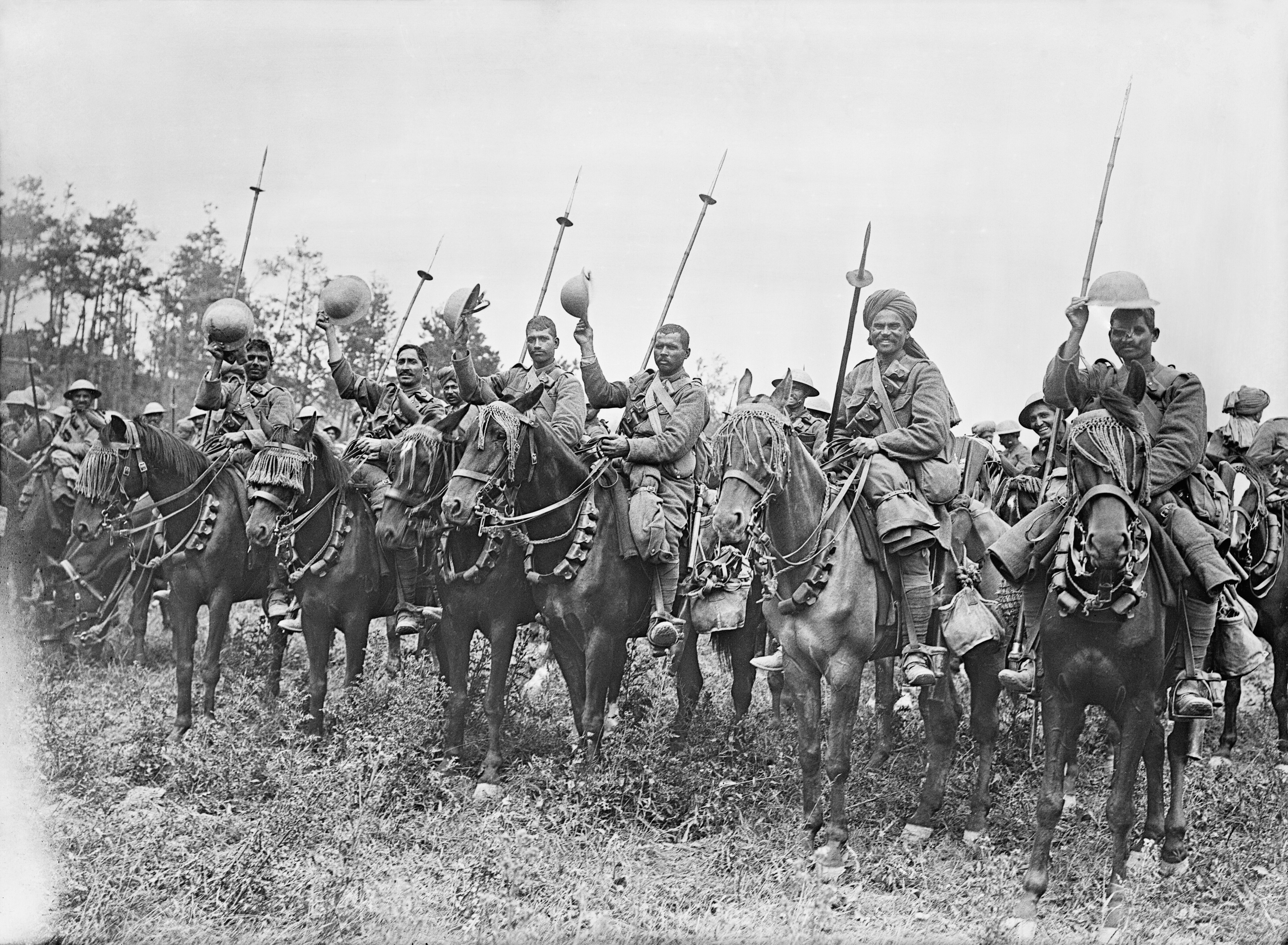
The 20th Deccan Horse in the Carnoy Valley shortly before their unsuccessful attack at High Wood during the Somme offensive, 14 July 1916

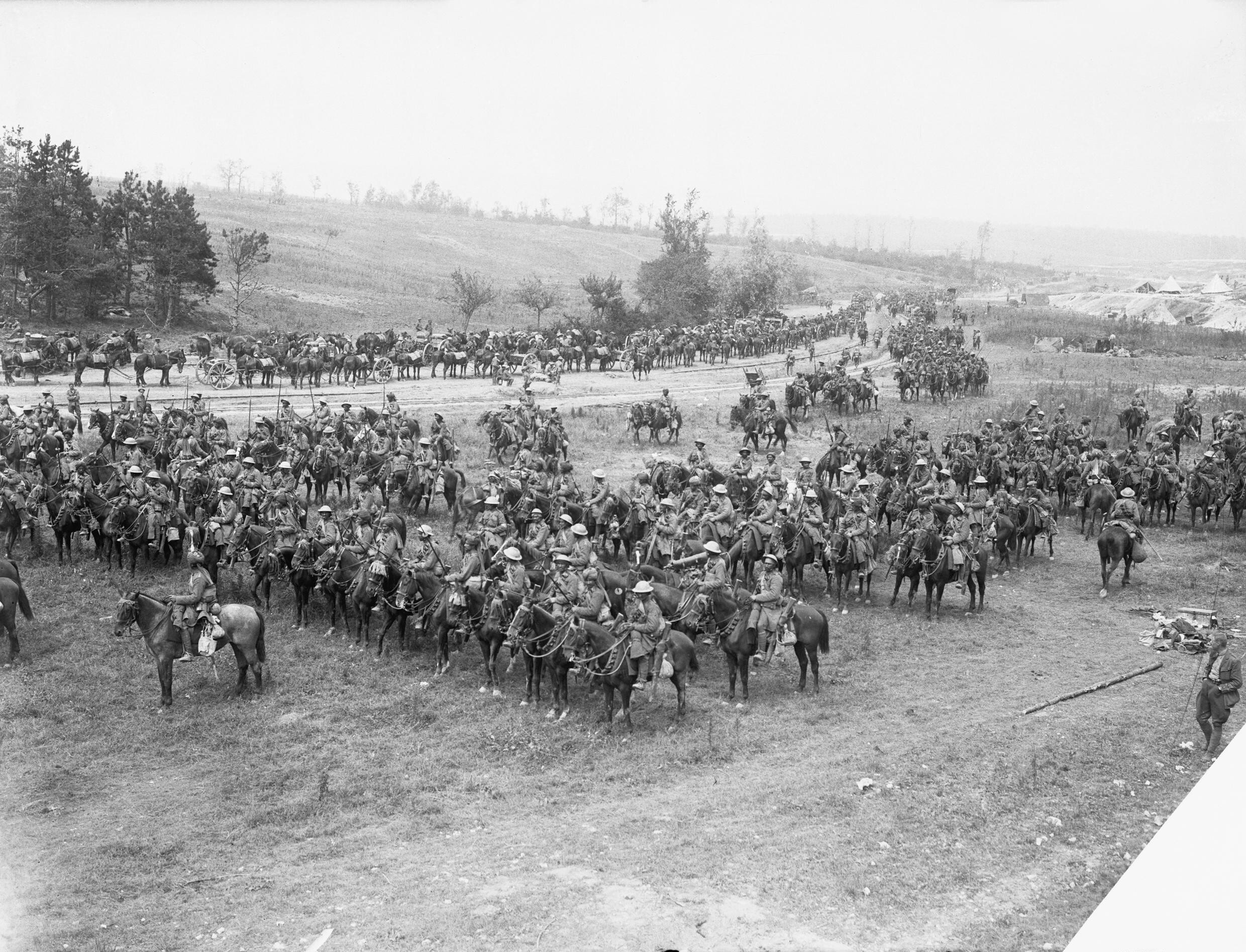
Deccan Horse, Bazentin Ridge in The Battle of the Somme, 1916

The regiment landed in Egypt on 10 April 1918 and moved to Tell El Kebir, Kantara and finally to Belah on 27 April 1918 to join the 14th Cavalry Brigade of the 5th Cavalry Division. The regiment was involved in frequent encounters with the Turkish forces in July and August 1918. The regiment moved to Deiran (Palestine) and fought in the Battle of Megiddo.

The 29th Lancers were also sent to France they formed part of the 8th (Lucknow) Cavalry Brigade of the 1st Indian Cavalry Division. Both regiments would at times serve as Infantry in the trenches, before being withdrawn for service in Palestine.

=== World War II ===
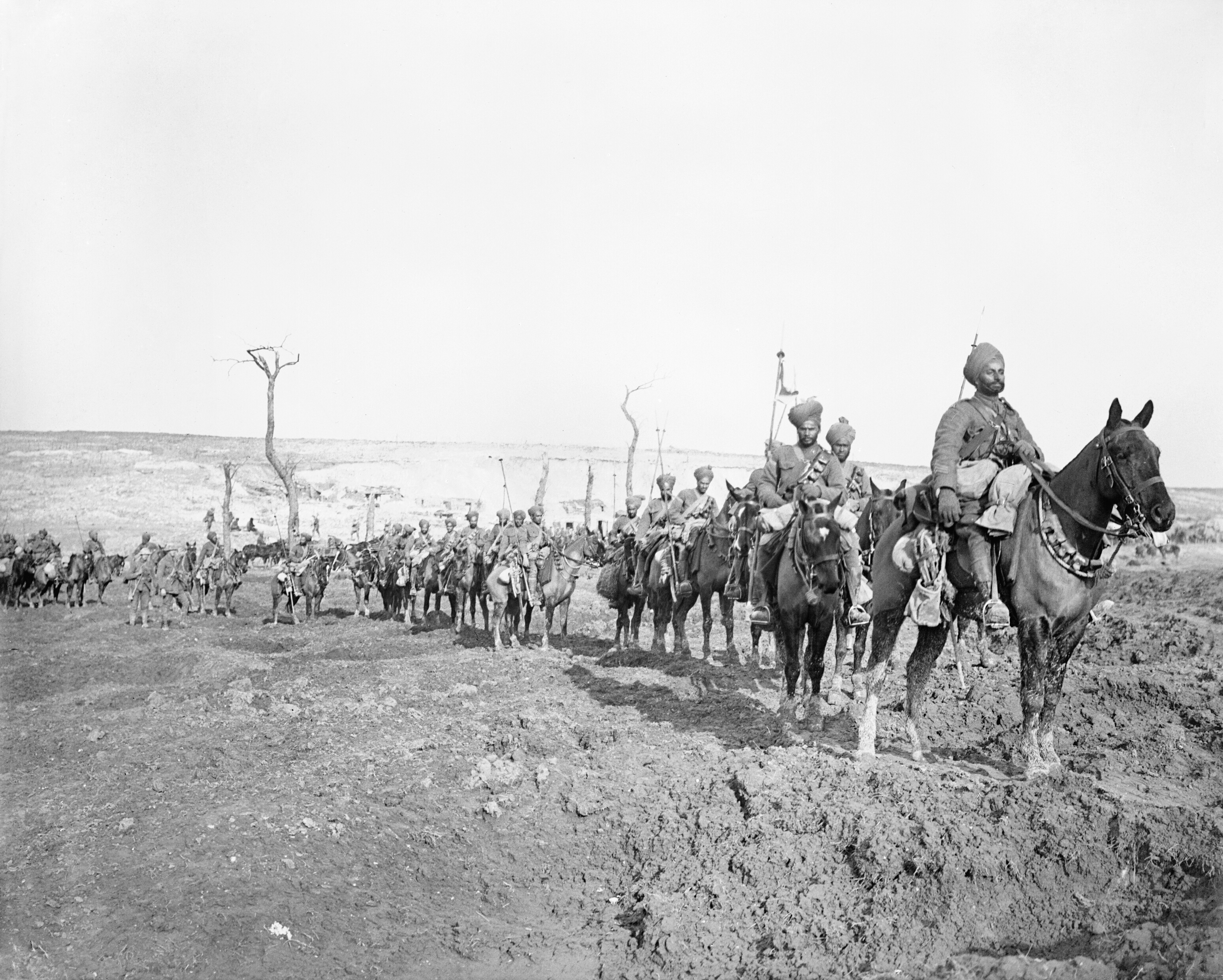
Troops of the 29th Lancers Regiment (Deccan Horse) near Pys, armed with lances and making their way through a shell torn landscape, following the German withdrawal to the Hindenburg Line, March 1917.

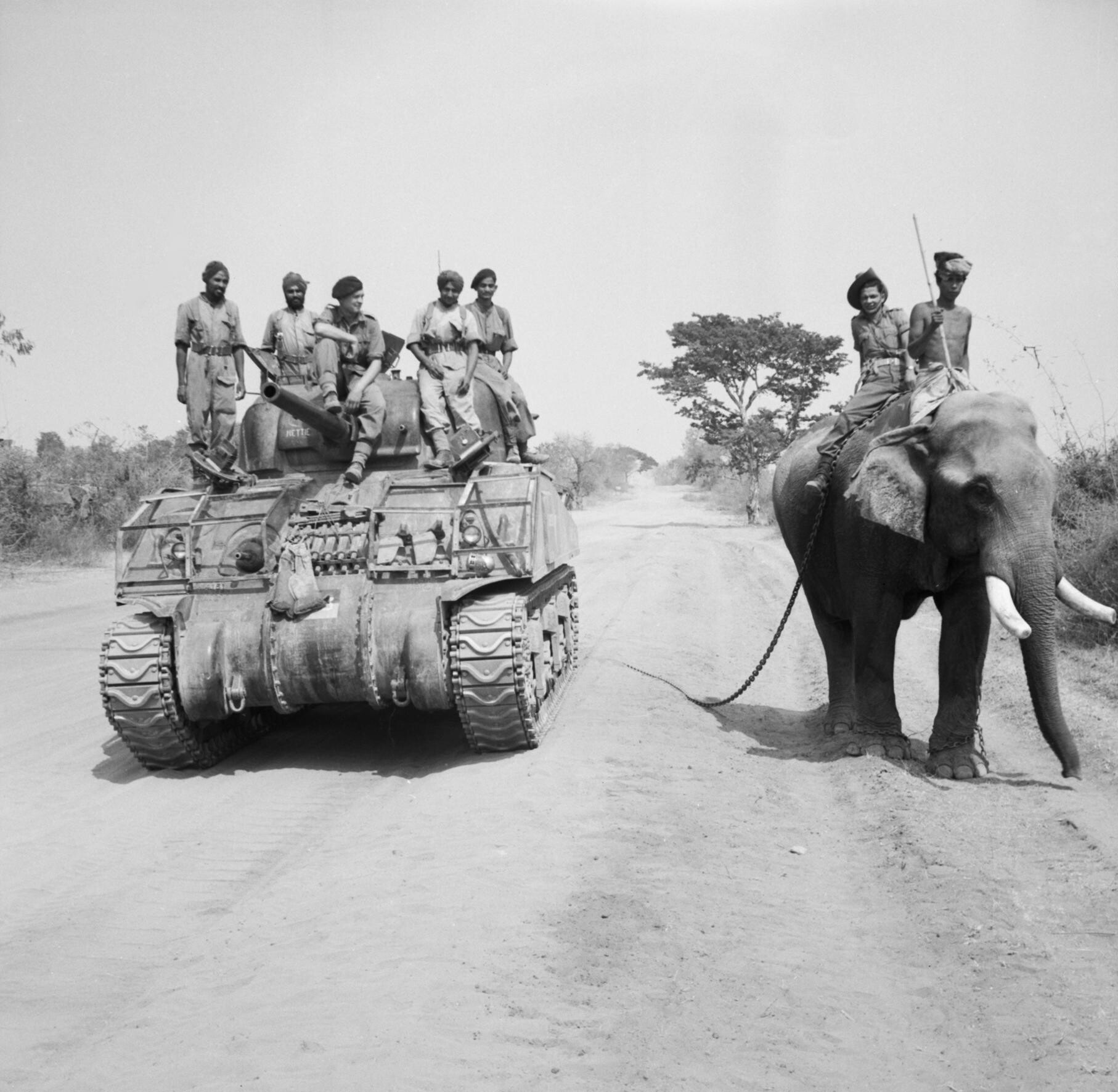
Sherman tank of the 9th Royal Deccan Horse on the road to Meiktila, 29 March 1945

During the Second World War, the regiment converted to tanks and became part of the 255th Indian Tank Brigade. The regiment along with 16th Light Cavalry, 5th King Edward's Own Probyn's Horse and 116th Royal Armoured Corps (Gordon Highlanders) reached Kanglatongbi in Assam in October 1944, where training and exercises took place. The regiment then proceeded east and took part in the re-conquest of Burma.

== Post Independence ==
=== Indo-Pakistani War of 1947–1948 ===
During the Indo-Pakistani War of 1947–1948 A squadron of the regiment fought in the Jammu and Kashmir operations (1948–49) in Chhamb sector. Tanks of the regiment were rafted across the Chenab River at Akhnoor.

=== Indo-Pakistani War of 1965 ===
During the Indo-Pakistani War of 1965, the regiment with its Sherman tanks saw fierce action in the Khemkaran Sector. It was one of the main units responsible for creating the 'Patton Graveyard' of Pakistani tanks. In the Battle of Asal Uttar, Pakistan lost 97 tanks including 75 of the latest Pattons. The Indians lost 14 tanks including 10 of the Deccan horse. The regiment won 24 decorations and the battle honours "Asal Uttar" and "Punjab 1965". The Commandant of the Regiment, Lt Col (later Gen) A S Vaidya was awarded the Maha Vir Chakra for leading the regiment with gallantry.

=== Indo-Pakistani War of 1971 ===
In the Indo-Pakistani War of 1971, The Deccan Horse with its T-54 tanks was once again at the forefront of the fight in the Battle of Chamb. The unit was part of the 10 Infantry Division. The Regimental headquarters and two squadron were with the 191 Infantry Brigade. The third squadron less a troop were with the 52 Infantry Brigade. It won six Gallantry awards. This gallant battle by the Regiment blunted and stalled the largest offensive ever mounted by Pakistan since Independence.

== Awards and honours ==
The unit was one of the most decorated regiments of the British Indian Army and has continued to show its valour under the Indian Army. Prominent winners of gallantry awards include:

Early years

- Battle honour : Central India
- Victoria Cross : Captain Herbert Clogstoun of the 2nd Cavalry, Hyderabad Contingent during the Indian Mutiny when the following deed took place on 15 January 1859 for which he was awarded the VC:

For conspicuous bravery in charging the, Rebels into Chichumbah with only eight men of his Regiment (the 2nd Cavalry Hyderabad Contingent), compelling them to re-enter the Town, and finally to abandon their plunder. He was severely wounded himself, and lost seven out of the eight men who accompanied him.

- Companions of the Order of the Bath: Major H. D. Abbott, Lieutenant H.C. Dowker, 1st Cavalry, Hyderabad Contingent; Major A. W. Macintire, 2nd Cavalry, Hyderabad Contingent, Brevet-Lieutenant-Colonel E. F. H. McSwiney, 1st Lancers, Hyderabad Contingent.
- Companion of the Distinguished Service Order : Lieutenant Macquoid.
- Order of British India : Risaldar Major Ahmad Bakhsh Khan, Hyderabad Contingent, Risaldar Major Karim Dad Khan, 20th Deccan Horse, Risaldar Major Hussain Khan, 29th Lancers (Deccan Horse).
- Indian Order of Merit : Jemadar Sahib Singh, Dufiadar Bhairi Lai Singh, Ressaidar Ala-ud-din, Jemadar Md. Din Khan, Jemadar Mir Karim Ali, Duffadar Jiwan Singh, Duffadar Ganesh Singh, Duffadar Sadhu Singh, Jemadar Alif Khan, Duffadar Ganga Singh, Trooper Mukarrim Khan, Ressaidar Mirza Anwar Ali Beg, Risaldar-Major Mirza Zulfikar Ali Beg, Ressaidar Abdul Rahman Khan, Duffadar Kasim Hussain Beg, Duffadar Kallandar Beg, Trooper Kudrat All Khan, 1st Cavalry, Hyderabad Contingent; Risaldar-Major Mir Dilawar Hussein, Ressaidar Bakshi Ali, and Jemadar Mir Akbar Ali, Jemadar Beg Muhammad Khan, Duffadar Bargir Muhammad Sharif, Trooper Mahomed Noor Khan, Ressaidar Meer Mahomed Shah, Trooper Meer Hossain Ali, Trooper Sheik Chand, Trooper Emom Ali Khan, Trooper Sheik Hyder, 2nd Cavalry, Hyderabad Contingent; Sowar Wazir Khan, Sowar Kale Khan, 2nd Lancers, Hyderabad Contingent; Dafadar Ghafur Khan, Dafadar Hussain Ali Khan, Dafadar Mir Murid Ali, Dafadar Kifayat Khan, Dafadar Anwar Khan, Kot Dafadar Shah Nur Khan, Dafadar Mustafa Khan, Dafadar Salamat Ali Khan, Dafadar Abdul Rahman Khan, 20th Deccan Horse.

=== Imperial Visit to India, 1911 ===
The following were honoured during the Imperial Visit of King George V to India

- Order of British India, 2nd class : Risaldar Major Shaikh Muhammad Afzal Husain, 29th Lancers (Deccan Horse), Risaldar Major Hanuman Singh, 20th Deccan Horse.

=== World War I ===
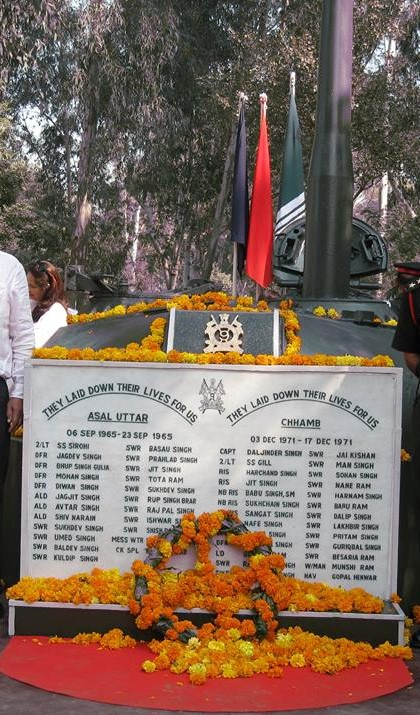
The Deccan Horse War Memorial, Jammu and Kashmir

- Battle honours : Givenchy, 1914, Somme, 1916, Bazentin, Delville Wood, Flers–Courcelette, Cambrai, 1917, France and Flanders 1914–18, Megiddo, Sharon, Damascus, and Palestine, 1918.
- Victoria Cross: Risaldar Badlu Singh – He was part of the 14th Murray's Jat Lancers attached to the 29th Lancers (Deccan Horse). He was awarded the Victoria Cross posthumously for his gallant act of bravery on 23 September 1918 at Kh. Es Samariyeh, Jordan River, Palestine. His citation reads as follows -

On 23rd September 1918 on the west bank of the River Jordan, Palestine, when his squadron was charging a strong enemy position, Risaldar Badlu Singh realised that heavy casualties were being inflicted from a small hill occupied by machine-guns and 200 infantry. Without any hesitation he collected six other ranks and with entire disregard of danger he charged and captured the position. He was mortally wounded on the very top of the hill when capturing one of the machine-guns single handed, but all the guns and infantry had surrendered to him before he died.

23 September is commemorated as "Jordan Valley Day" every year in the Regiment. Other gallantry awards include:

- Military Cross: Jemadar Jai Lal Singh, 29th Lancers (Deccan Horse) (Egypt)
- Order of British India: Risaldar Prem Singh, Risaldar Major Nigahia Ram, Risaldar Konsal Singh (20th Deccan Horse) (France); Risaldar Major Ghulam Dastaghir Khan, Risaldar Major Chanda Singh, Risaldar Major Ahmad Khan, Risaldar Hayat Ali Beg, Ressaidar Daya Singh, Ressaidar Jaggar Singh (29th Lancers (Deccan Horse)) (France / Egypt / India).
- Indian Order of Merit: Dafadar Sardar Singh, Dafadar Shankar Rao, Jemadar Mirza Ahmed Beg (20th Deccan Horse), Risaldar Hayat Ali Beg, Jemadar Abdul Rahim Khan, Sowar Indar Singh, Sowar Chandan Singh, Dafadar Puran Singh, Dafadar Jot Ram, Sowar Balwant Singh (29th Lancers (Deccan Horse)) (France / Egypt).
- Indian Distinguished Service Medals: 27 medals (20th Deccan Horse), 22 medals (29th Lancers (Deccan Horse)) (France / Egypt).
- Indian Meritorious Service Medals: 40 medals (20th Deccan Horse), 33 medals (29th Lancers (Deccan Horse)) (France / Egypt).
- Croix De Guerre (French): 2 medals (20th Deccan Horse), 1 medal (29th Lancers (Deccan Horse)) (France).
- Leim Alilimdetaire (French): 1 medal (20th Deccan Horse) (France).
- Croix de guerre (Belgium): 1 medal (20th Deccan Horse), 3 medals (29th Lancers (Deccan Horse)) (France)

=== World War II ===
- Battle honours : Meiktila and Rangoon Road, Capture of Meiktila, Defence of Meiktila, Pyabwe and Burma 1942–45.
- Commander of the Most Excellent Order of the British Empire (CBE) : Major General A G O M Mayne
- Distinguished Service Order : Acting Lieutenant Colonel George Hannyngton Carr
- Member of the Most Excellent Order of the British Empire : Risaldar Major Mir Yusaf Ali
- Military Cross: Captain David Herbert Mudie, Captain Robert Bruce Kennard, Temporary Captain Sheodan Singh, Second Lieutenant Richard Francis Sherwill, Jemadar Pritam Singh
- The regiment won 36 gallantry awards.

=== Indo-Pakistani War of 1965 ===
- Battle honours : Asal Uttar, Punjab 1965
- Maha Vir Chakra : Lt Col AS Vaidya
- Vir Chakra : A Lance/Dafadar Tirlok Singh, Risaldar Achhar Singh.
- Sena Medal : Risaldar Kisal Singh, Dafadar Babu Singh, Sowar Sant Singh
- The regiment won 24 gallantry awards.

=== Indo-Pakistani War of 1971 ===
- Vir Chakra : Captain Surendra Kaushik, Lance Dafadar Sushil Kumar, Risaldar Brahma Nand, Sowar Jai Singh.
- The regiment won 6 gallantry awards.

=== President's Guidon ===
In recognition of its distinguished service, the Deccan Horse was selected for presentation of a "Guidon" by the President of India Giani Zail Singh at Nabha on 9 January 1984.

== Regimental insignia ==
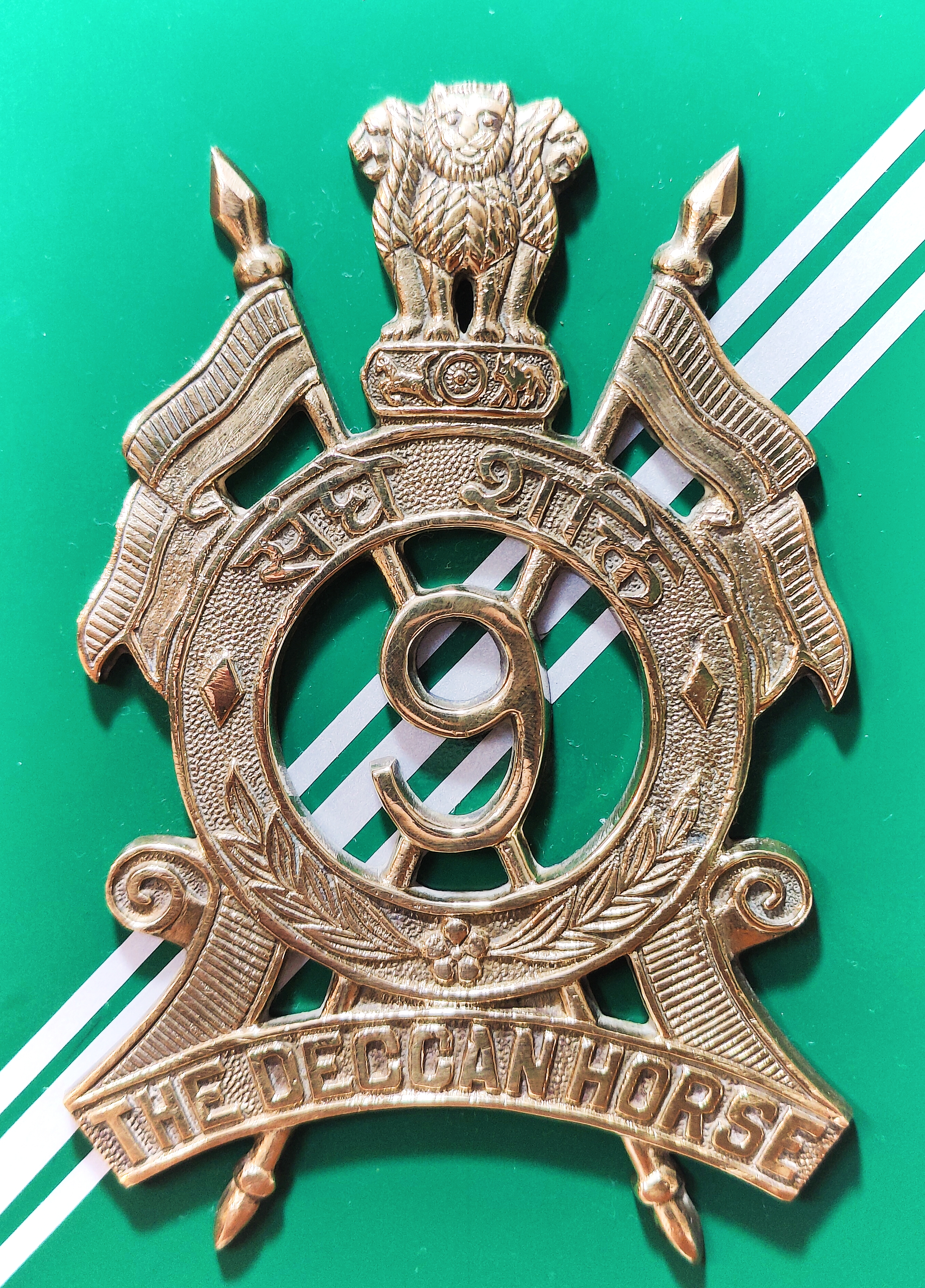
The Deccan Horse (9 HORSE) Regimental Insignia

The insignia of the 9th Royal Deccan Horse consisted of crossed lances with letters 'R.D.H.' within the garter surmounted by the crown. The present Regimental insignia consists of crossed lances with pennons of Red over White mounted with the State Emblem of India and a scroll at the base with the words The Deccan Horse. The numeral "9" is inscribed on the crossing of the lances along with the motto of the Regiment in Devanagari script. The motto of the Regiment is संघे शक्ति (Sanghe Shakti) which means "In Association, there is Strength".
