= Kishori =

Coordinates: 16.3769886°N 75.3980434°E

Kishori is a village in Mudhol, Bagalkot district, Karnataka, India. It is situated 15 kilometres (9.3 mi) from the sub-district headquarters at Mudhol and 55 kilometres (34 mi) from its district headquarters at Bagalkot. As per 2015 records, Melligeri is the gram panchayat for the village. Before 2015, Mantur was the gram panchayat for the village.

According to the 2011 Census of India, the total geographical area of the village was 617.26 hectares. It had a population of 750 spread over about 155 houses.

Kishori is famous for its rich heritage. The Sri Hanumanji Vokali festival, which is similar to a water game, takes place every year. Kara Hunnive is also a famous festival in the village.

The first woman member elected from Kishori village to the Gram panchayat Mantur was Smt. Anasuya A. Patil.

In Kishori village, a school, wells, and many welfare works were started, and building were constructed by Sri Channappa Gouda Bidari, who is the Dhalapati of Kishori village.
