= Sūdan =

Sūdan (1700–1753) was the main court poet of Maharaja Suraj Mal, the Bharatpur ruler in Rajputana. He was Mathur by caste, resident of Mathura and the most favourite poet of the Bharatpur Maharaja Suraj Mal. He had accompanied the Maharaja during all important wars and has written historical account in the book named Sujān Charitra.

== See also ==
- Braj Bhasha
- Bharatpur
