= Maharaja Surajmal Stadium metro station =

Metro station in Delhi, India

Maharaja Surajmal Stadium

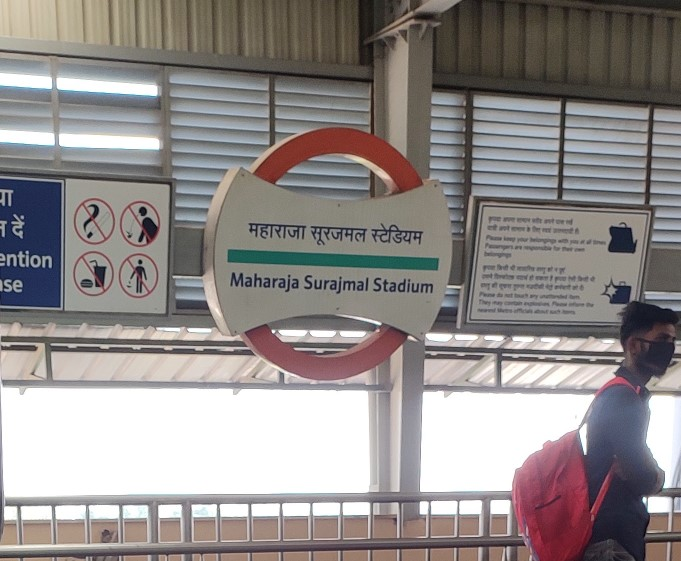
- Maharaja Surajmal Jat Stadium Metro Station

General information
- Location: Rohtak Rd, Nangloi, New Delhi, Delhi 110041
- Coordinates: 28°40′54″N 77°04′26″E
- System: Delhi Metro station
- Owner: Delhi Metro Rail Corporation
- Line: Green Line
- Platforms: Side platform; Platform-1 → Brigadier Hoshiyar Singh; Platform-2 → Inderlok / Kirti Nagar
- Tracks: 2

Construction
- Structure type: Elevated
- Platform levels: 2
- Accessible: Yes

Other information
- Station code: SMSM

History
- Opened: 2 April 2010; 16 years ago
- Electrified: 25 kV 50 Hz AC through overhead catenary

Passengers
- Jan 2015: 3,333 /day 103,335/ Month average

Services
Preceding station	Delhi Metro	Following station
Nangloi towards Brigadier Hoshiyar Singh	Green Line	Udyog Nagar towards Inderlok or Kirti Nagar
Route map
Location

Maharaja Surajmal Stadium is a station on the Green Line of the Delhi Metro and is located in the West Delhi district of Delhi. It is an elevated station and was inaugurated on 2 April 2010.

== History ==
Maharaja Surajmal Singh Stadium metro station's name is kept on the famous Indian Jat ruler Maharaja Surajmal who defeated the invading Afgan army of Ahmad Shah Abdali. He also fought against the Mughals by uniting the Jats of that time.

== Station layout ==
L2	Side platform | Doors will open on the left
L2	Platform 2 Eastbound	Towards → Inderlok / Kirti Nagar; Next Station: Udyog Nagar
L2	Platform 1 Westbound	Towards ← Brigadier Hoshiyar Singh; Next Station: Nangloi
L2	Side platform | Doors will open on the left
L1	Concourse	Fare control, station agent, Metro Card vending machines, crossover
G	Street level	Exit/Entrance

== Facilities ==
List of available ATM at Surajmal Stadium metro station are

== See also ==
- List of Delhi Metro stations
- Transport in Delhi
- Delhi Metro Rail Corporation
- Delhi Suburban Railway
- List of rapid transit systems in India
