= Shirguppi =

- Village
- Nickname: "The Guppi House"
- Interactive map of Shirguppi
- Coordinates: 16.38°N 74.37°E
- Country: India
- State: Karnataka
- District: Belgaum
- Talukas: Chikodi

Languages
  - Official: Kannada
  - Spoken: Kannada, Marathi
- Time zone: UTC+5:30 (IST)
- Postal code: 591237
- Telephone code: 08338
- Vehicle registration: KA23
- Nearest city: Nipani
- Lok Sabha constituency: Nipani
- Vidhan Sabha constituency: Nipani

Shirguppi is a village in Belgaum district of Karnataka, India. It is situated 2 km from Nipani City. It is famous for cash crops, sugar cane, tobacco, and ground nuts. It has an ancient water supply system called "Udata Bamb" which was previously used for supplying water from Shirguppi to nearby city Nipani.
