= Udyog Nagar metro station =

Metro station in Delhi, India

Udyog Nagar

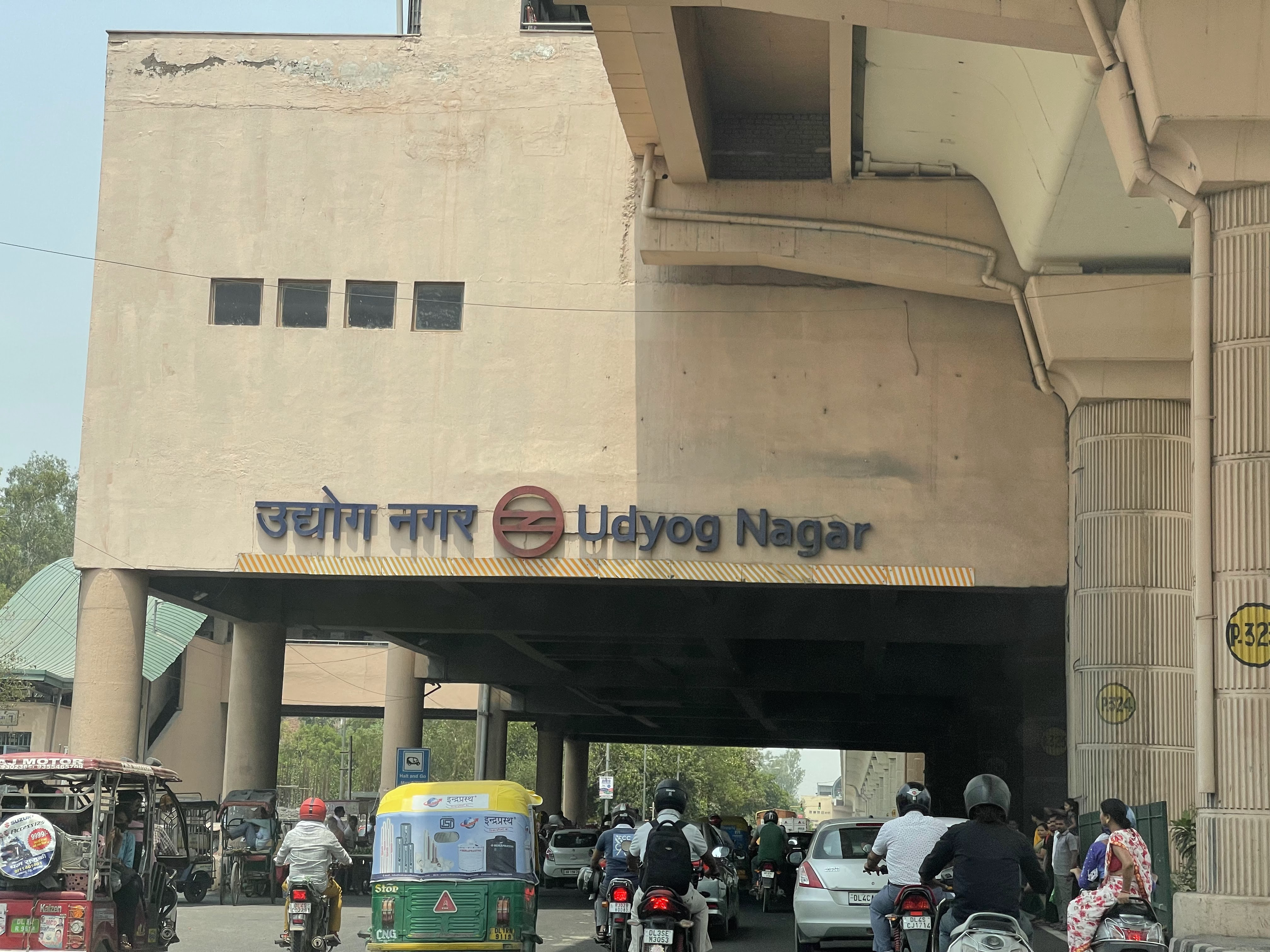

General information
- Location: Main Rohtak Road, Udyog Nagar, Delhi – 110041
- Coordinates: 28°40′52″N 77°04′51″E
- System: Delhi Metro station
- Owner: Delhi Metro Rail Corporation
- Line: Green Line
- Platforms: Side platform; Platform-1 → Brigadier Hoshiyar Singh; Platform-2 → Inderlok / Kirti Nagar
- Tracks: 2

Construction
- Structure type: Elevated
- Platform levels: 2
- Parking: Available
- Cycle facilities: yes
- Accessible: Yes

Other information
- Station code: UNRG

History
- Opened: 2 April 2010; 16 years ago
- Electrified: 25 kV 50 Hz AC through overhead catenary

Passengers
- Jan 2015: 4,215 /day 130,664/ Month average

Services
Preceding station	Delhi Metro	Following station
Maharaja Surajmal Stadium towards Brigadier Hoshiyar Singh	Green Line	Peeragarhi towards Inderlok or Kirti Nagar
Route map
Location

Udyog Nagar is a metro station on the Green Line of the Delhi Metro and is located in Udyog Nagar in the Mangolpuri area near Mangolpuri railway station in the West Delhi district of Delhi. It is an elevated station and was inaugurated on 2 April 2010.

Some prominent residential colonies nearby are Inder Enclave, Mianwali Nagar, Sunder Vihar, Jwala Puri, Shiv Vihar-Poojary Apartments, Defence Apartments, Lord Buddha Society, Vindhyachal Apartments, Virat Apartments and Tribhuvan Apartments in Bhera Enclave.

The renowned editor, Mr Pradeep Chakraborty, has been living in this area since 1984-85.

== Station layout ==
L2	Side platform | Doors will open on the left
L2	Platform 2 Eastbound	Towards → Inderlok / Kirti Nagar; Next Station: Peeragarhi
L2	Platform 1 Westbound	Towards ← Brigadier Hoshiyar Singh; Next Station: Maharaja Surajmal Stadium
L2	Side platform | Doors will open on the left
L1	Concourse	Fare control, station agent, Metro Card vending machines, crossover
G	Street level	Exit/Entrance

== Exit ==
Gate No 1- Jwalapuri, Nihal Vihar, Guru Harkishan Nagar, Shiv Vihar-Poojary Apartments, Inder Enclave

Gate No 2- Udyog Nagar Industrial Area, Mangolpuri, Nangloi Bus Depot

== See also ==
- List of Delhi Metro stations
- Transport in Delhi
- Delhi Metro Rail Corporation
- Delhi Suburban Railway
- List of rapid transit systems in India
