= Suraj Mal =

Maharaja of Bharatpur from 1755 to 1763

- Maharaja of Bharatpur
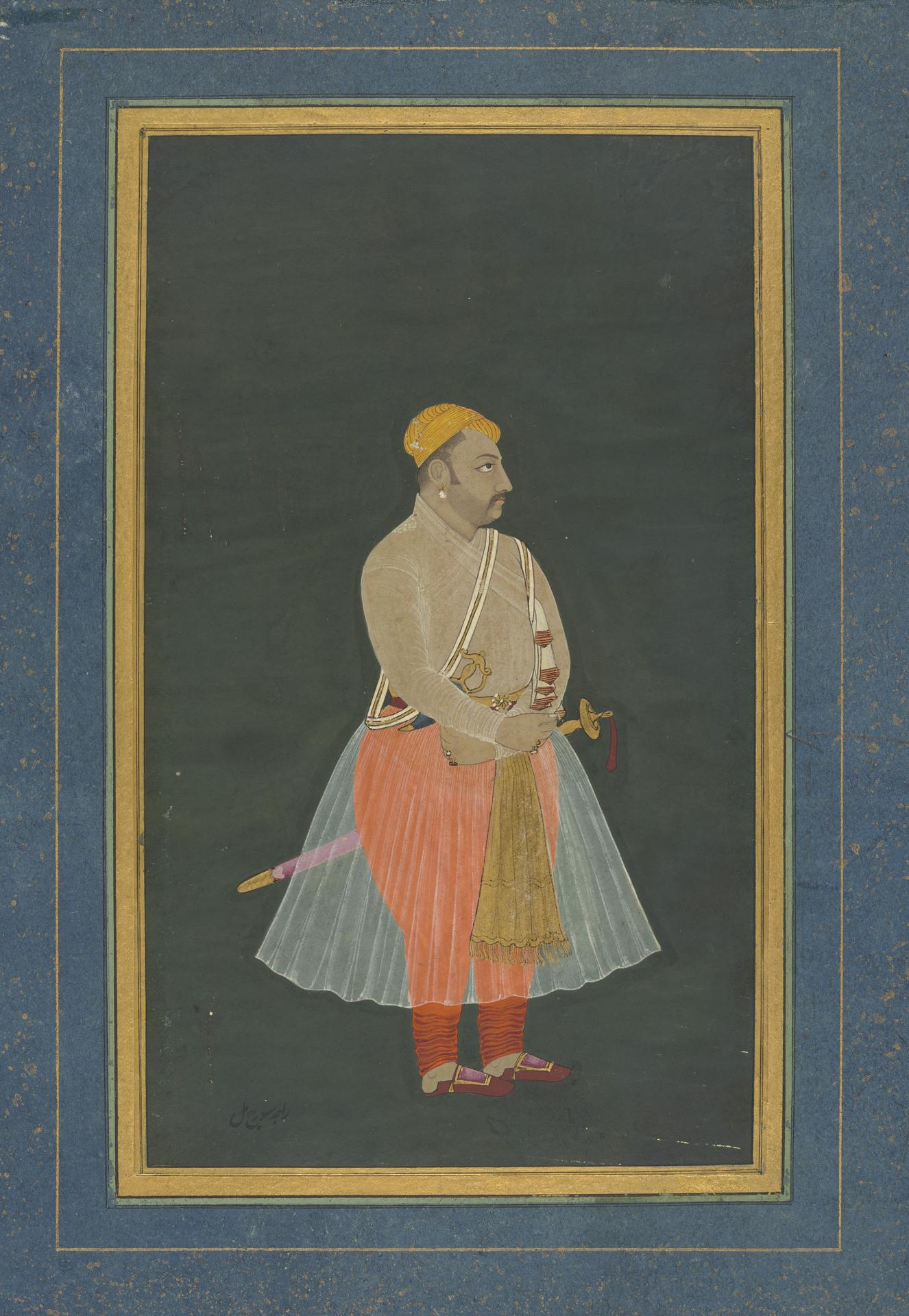
- Maharaja Surajmal

Maharaja of Bharatpur
- Reign: 23 May 1755 – 25 December 1763
- Coronation: Deeg, 23 May 1755
- Predecessor: Badan Singh
- Successor: Jawahar Singh
- Born: Sujan Singh; 13 February 1707; Bharatpur
- Died: 25 December 1763 (aged 56) near Delhi
- Wives: Maharani Kishori; Rani Gauri
- Issue: Jawahar Singh; Nahar Singh; Ratan Singh; Nawal Singh; Ranjit Singh
- House: Sinsiniwar
- Father: Badan Singh
- Mother: Maharani Devki
- Religion: Hinduism

Maharaja Suraj Mal (13 February 1707 – 25 December 1763), simply known as Suraj Mal, was a ruler of Bharatpur State in Rajputana. Under him, Bharatpur State, an independent state, covered the present-day districts of Agra, Alwar, Aligarh, Bharatpur, Dholpur, Etawa, Hathras, Mainpuri, Meerut, Ghaziabad, Mathura, and Rohtak, Sonipat, Jhajjar, Nuh, Palwal, Faridabad, Kasganj, Mainpuri, Firozabad, Bulandshahr.

A contemporary historian had described him as "the Plato of the Jat tribe" and by a modern writer as similar to the "Jat Ulysses", because of his "political sagacity, steady intellect and clear vision." The people, under Suraj Mal, overran the Mughal garrison at Agra. In addition to the troops stationed at his forts, he had an army of more than 75,000 infantry and more than 38,000 cavalry.

Lohagarh Fort is one of the well-known forts located in Bharatpur city of Rajasthan which was built by Maharaja Suraj Mal in 1732 on an artificial island and took eight years to complete. He is famous for building other such forts and palaces in his kingdom. It needed large number of manpower and significant amount of wealth to build such impregnable fort, as the name of the fort itself says-- "Lohagarh", which means, Iron fort (Loha means Iron and Garh means fort). Lohagarh Fort is considered as one of the strongest fort as British forces led by Lord Lake could not capture it in spite of several attacks during the Siege of Bharatpur. Lord Lake made a siege of the fort in 1805 for six weeks but in spite of so many attacks he couldn't annex it. Later between December 1825 and January 1826, British troops under Lord Combermere initially surrounded the state's capital until on 18 January 1826 its fortress was stormed and captured. After this siege, Bharatpur became princely state under British Raj control.

Deeg Palace is a Palace in Deeg and 32 km from city of Bharatpur in Deeg District in Rajasthan, India. It was built in 1730 by Maharaja Suraj Mal as a luxurious summer resort for the rulers of Bharatpur State.

== Early life ==
Maharaja Suraj Mal was born as Sujan Singh on 13 February 1707, to Raja Badan Singh and Rani Devki in a Hindu Jat family of the Sinsinwar clan of Bharatpur (present-day Rajasthan, India). He was the 21st descendant of Sobha Singh of Bayana. The Hindu Kingdom reached its prosperous state under Maharaja Surajmal. Sujan Singh was martially trained at a young age. He was given power over the state by his increasingly blind father Badan Singh in 1750 and succeeded him officially as maharaja in 1756.

== Military career ==
=== Chandaus War (1745) ===
The Chandaus War, a significant event in Maharaja Surajmal's career, took place in 1745 when Delhi Mughal Badshah Muhammad Shah angered Nawab Fateh Ali Khan of Koil (Aligarh). To punish him, Badsah sent an Afghan Chieftain, Asad Khan. Fateh Ali Khan sought Suraj Mal's help, and in November 1745, he took his first independent decision in external political and army affairs. Surajmal assured Fateh Ali Khan to help and sent an army under his son's command. The war at Chandaus resulted in the death of Asad Khan and the defeat of the royal army, thereby increasing the power of Bharatpur Kingdom.

=== Battle of Bagru (1748) ===
Maharaja Surajmal had a good relationship with Jai Singh of Jaipur. After Jaisingh's death, his sons Ishwari Singh and Madho Singh began fighting over the throne. Maharaja Surajmal wanted to make Ishwari Singh the next heir, while Maharana Jagat Singh wanted Madho Singh the King. The fight lasted until Ishwari Singh won in March 1747. Madho Singh returned with the Marathas, Rathores, and Sisodia Kings of Udaipur, and king Surajmal supported Ishwari Singh with 10,000 soldiers. Ishwari Singh won the battle in August 1748 and obtained the royal text of Jaipur.

=== Plunder of Delhi ===
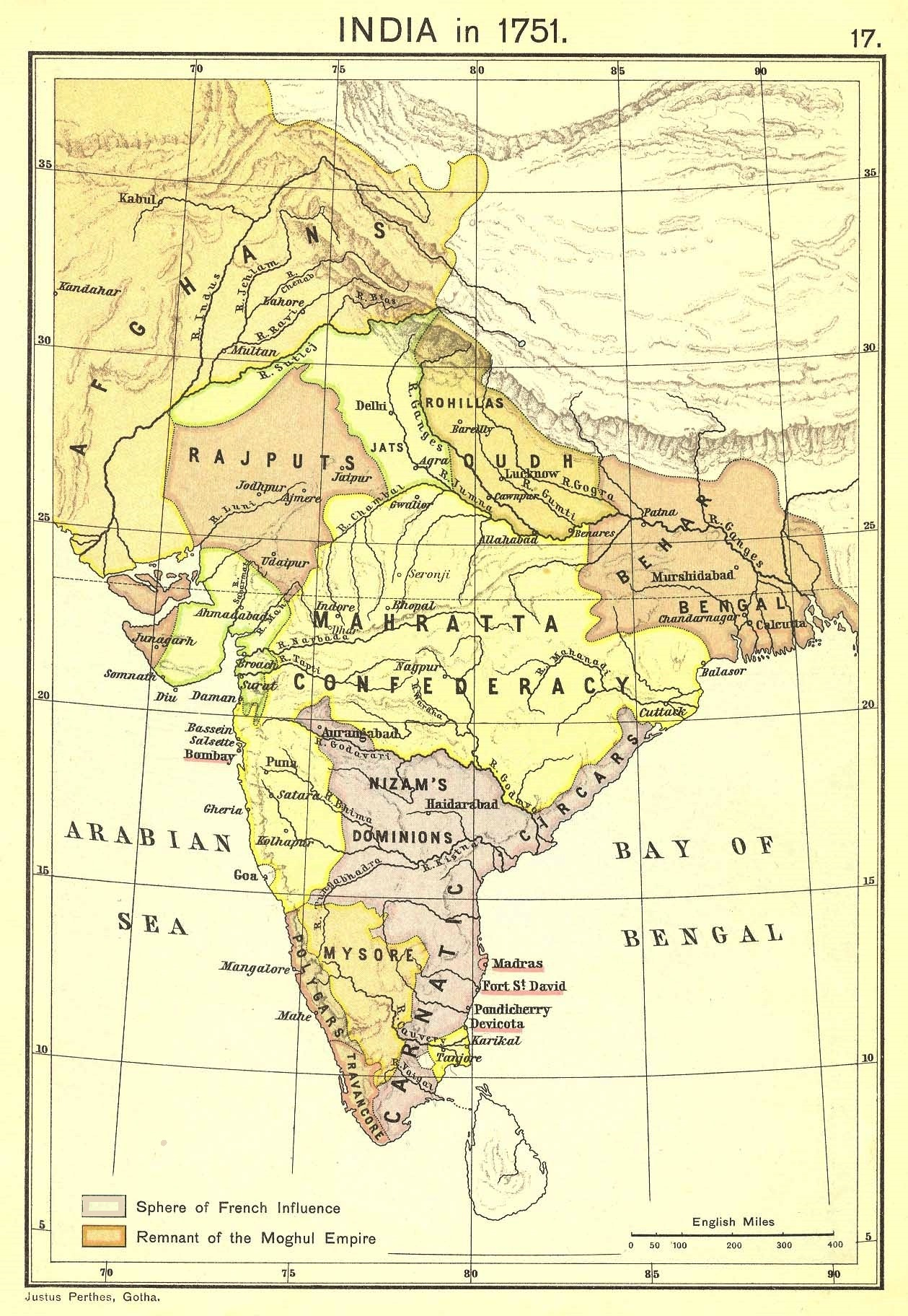
Map of the Indian Subcontinent in 1751.

The Mughal Emperor had taken back the domain of Awadh and Allahabad from Safdar Jang, wazir of Oudh State, and to avenge his humiliation, Safdar Jang rebelled and attacked Delhi. Suraj Mal also fought under Safdar Jang against the Mughals. On Suraj's advice, Safdar Jang reacted by appointing Akbar Ādilshāh as emperor. On 14 May the supporters of Suraj Mal sacked Chārbāg, Bāg-e-kultāt and Hakīm Munīm Bridge; the next day, Jaisinghpura went on to burn several areas. On 16 May Suraj Mal under Safdar Jang attacked Delhi and defeated Sādil Khan and Raja Devidatta in battle.

=== Battle of Kumher ===
Mughal Emperor Alamgir II and his rebellious courtier Siraj ud-Daulah were having a factional feud. Suraj Mal had sided with Siraj. Alamgir sought the help of the Holkar Marathas of Indore. Khanderao Holkar, son of the Maharaja of Indore, Malhar Rao Holkar, laid siege on Suraj Mal's town of Kumher in 1754. While inspecting the troops on an open palanquin in the battle of Kumher, Khanderao was hit and killed by a cannonball from the Bharatpur army. The siege was lifted and a treaty was signed between Suraj Mal and the Marathas, which later proved helpful for Suraj Mal in consolidating his rule. After successfully defending Kumher against 80,000 men led by Malhar Holkar, Imad, and a Jaipur General, his fame spread all over India.

=== Suraj Mal and Abdali ===
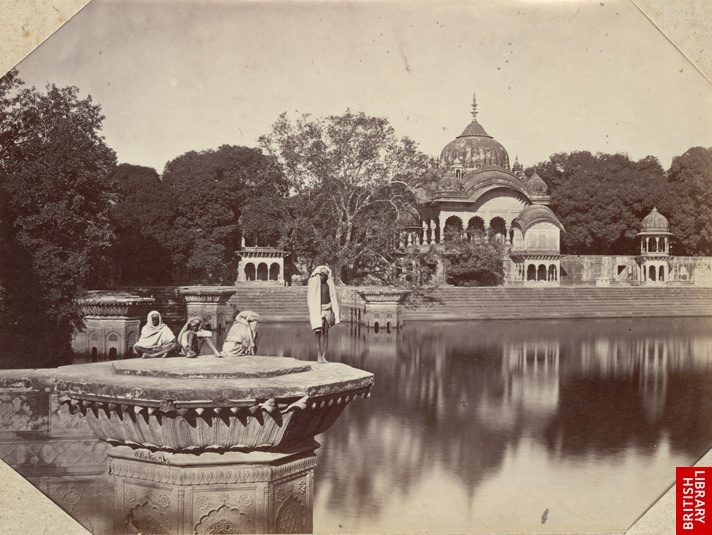
Suraj Mal's Cenotaph at Govardhan, a photo by William Henry Baker, c.1860.

After his victory over Dattaji on 10 January 1760, Durrani came to Delhi, and called upon Suraj Mal to pay him tribute and join his camp. On such occasions Suraj Mal invariably played a humble role, pleading that he was a petty zamindar. He informed the Shah that he would readily pay his share to the lawful ruler of Delhi at a fixed time. If Durrani stayed in India and assumed sovereignty, he would obey him as his legal master. At the time of the demand he possessed no money as his country had been ruined by the constant movements and pillage of the Marathas and Afghans. It was not in Durrani's nature to tolerate such defiance. He besieged Suraj Mal's fort of Dig on 6 February 1760. Later, he realized that it would require a long time to reduce the strongly fortified, largely garrisoned and heavily provisioned fortress. In such cases he did not make it a matter of prestige. He quietly raised the siege, and marched in pursuit of Malhar Rao Holkar.

Having routed the Maratha chief at Sikandrabad on 4 March 1760, Durrani marched upon Koil (present-day Aligarh) which was ruled by Suraj Mal, and he invested the fort of Ramgarh which was commanded by Durjansal. The fort was well-garrisoned and fortified, and large stocks of provisions had been stored therein. The fort could have resisted for long; but the qiladar was disheartened at the occupation of the entire upper Ganga Doab by the Afghans, and to save himself from a massacre, he capitulated in a fortnight or so.

=== Capture of Alwar Fort ===
Madho Singh of Jaipur had occupied Alwar Fort by paying Rupees 50 thousand as bribe to its custodian and sending 500 men. When Suraj Mal heard of it, he despatched a strong force of 5,000 under Rup Ram Katari and the siege of the fort was taken up. Soon after Jawahar Singh also joined him. In the ensuing fight there, the Jats easily gained the day and thus wrested the fort from the Rajputs (c. 23 March 1756). The Jaipur ruler, though visibly mortified by the reverse, held back as he felt himself powerless in ejecting the Jats."

=== Conquest of Agra ===
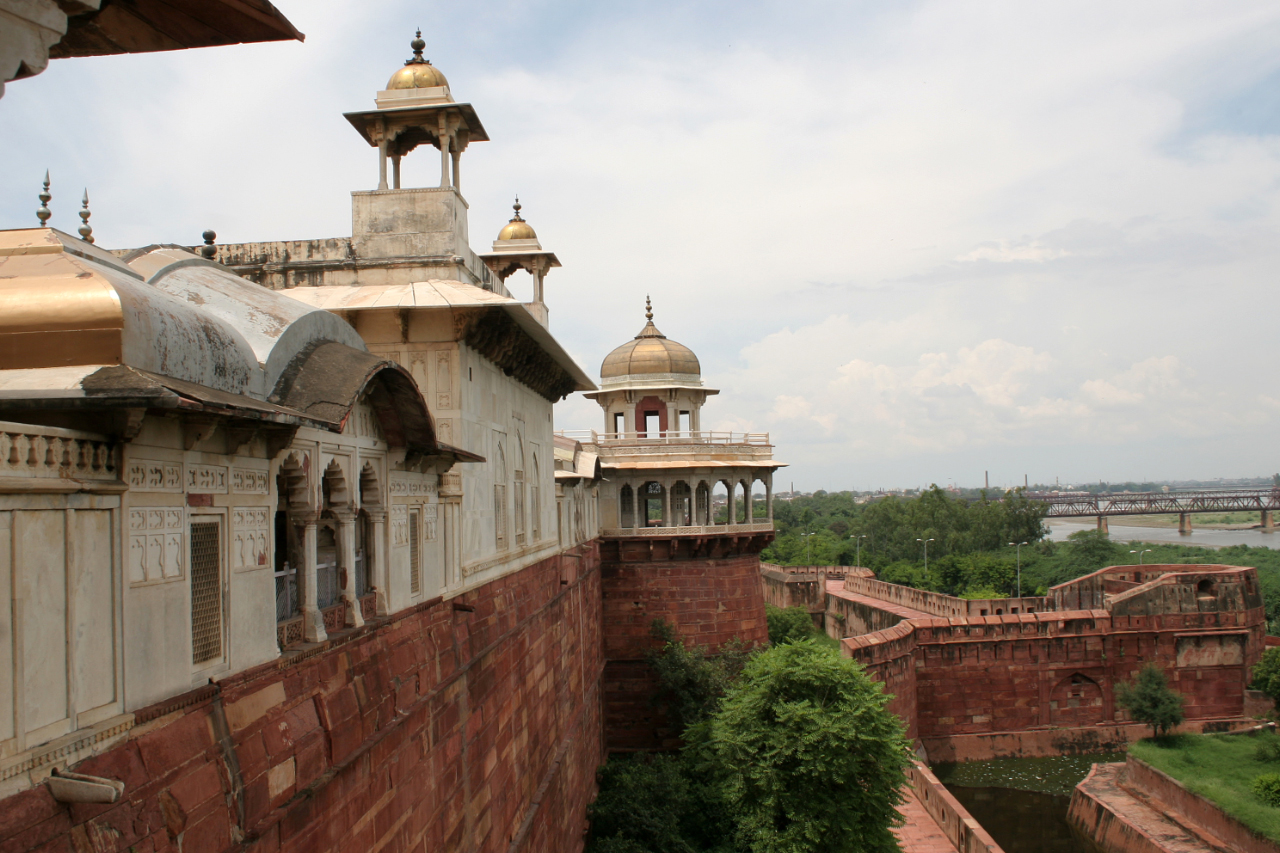
Agra Fort was captured by Suraj Mal in 1761.

Suraj Mal decided to capture Agra Fort (which was closeby to the rich town of Agra) to re-establish his influence in Doaba region. On 3 May 1761 the army of Suraj Mal with 4,000 soldiers reached Agra under the command of Balram and gave the message of Suraj Mal to the kiledar (in charge) of Agra Fort that the army wanted to cross the Yamuna and required a place to camp, which the kiledar gave his sanction. Meanwhile, the army entered the fort, but was resisted by the guards, this resulted in 200 lives lost. The army started war from the Jama Masjid. During this period, Suraj Mal stayed at Mathura to observe the situation. On 24 May 1761 Suraj Mal along with Imād and Gangadhar Tantya moved from Mathura, crossed the Yamuna and reached Aligarh. From Aligarh his army moved and captured the areas of the ruler of Koīl and Jalesar. They reached Agra to help his army at Agra in the first week of June. Suraj Mal arrested the family members of the guards staying in Agra town and pressured the guards of the fort to surrender. At last the kiledar agreed to surrender by receiving a bribe of Rs 1 lakh and a jagir of five villages. Thus after a siege of one month, Suraj Mal captured Agra Fort on 12 June 1761.

=== Conquest of Haryana (1762) ===
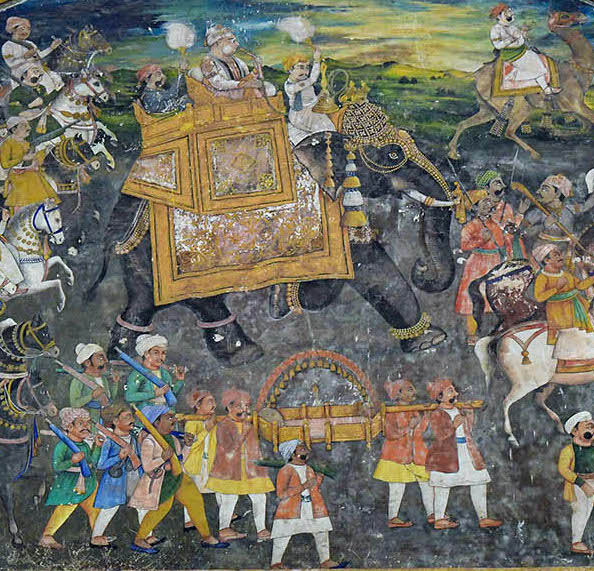
Mural depicting Maharaja Suraj Mal of Bharatpur (in howdah) in a war procession, from the Samadhi of Maharaja Suraj Mal, Govardhan Hills, Mathura, Uttar Pradesh, ca.1768

The Battle of Panipat in 1761 marked a significant turning point in the history of Northern India, as it disrupted the Marathas' ambitions and brought no permanent peace to Islam. The Jat, however, challenged the Marathas, who were exhausted and weary, and the Jat's courage revived Hindu confidence, putting Islam on the defensive. Maharaj Surajmal aimed to seize this opportunity to establish a Jat confederacy between the Abdāli and the Rohillas, expel Najib-ud-Daula from Delhi, restore his protégé Ghazi-ud-din, and control the empire's policy. He chose to cover Delhi during his campaign, focusing on expanding his dominion in Haryana and surrounding districts. SurajMal's sons Jawahar Singh and Nahar Singh were sent to conquer Haryana with help of Rao Gujarmal of Rewari (Rao Gujarmal was turban brother (Pagdi bhai) of Surajmal and establish authority in Doab, while monitoring the movement of eastern Rohila chiefs.

== Death ==
The Rohilla Afghans under Najib ud-Daula had now been encircled which made war inevitable. The Rohilla alongside Sayyidu Muhammad Khan, Afzal Khan and Zabita Khan had mobilized their troops; though these were bigger in number but they had inferior weaponry against Maharaja Suraj Mal's army. The latter's army was then mobilized and with its superior numbers could have decimated the Rohilla in two days, but an ambush by Sayyidu near the Hindon River took Maharaja Suraj Mal's army by surprise. Outnumbered, Maharaja Suraj Mal was killed on the night of 25 December 1763.

== Legacy ==
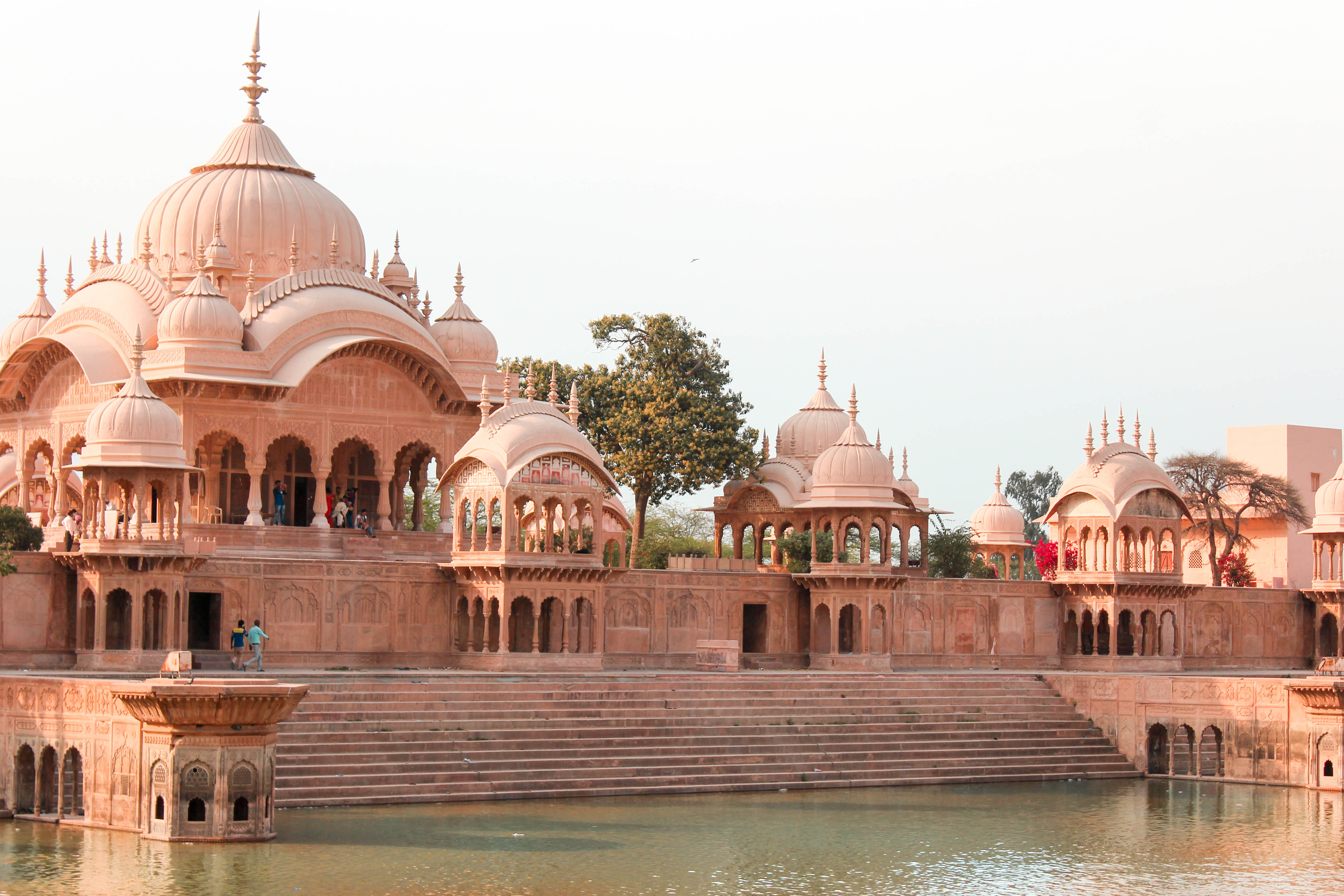
Kusum Sarovar, where the cenotaph of Suraj Mal is located.

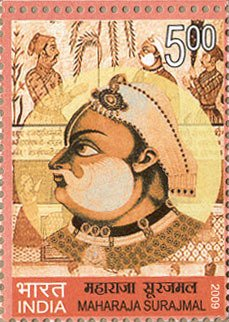
Stamp of India - 2009 Maharaja Surajmal

His large cenotaph is located in Kusum Sarovar, Govardhan, Uttar Pradesh. His imposing chattri is flanked on either side by two smaller chattris of his two wives, "Hansiya" and "Kishori". These memorial chattris were built by his son and successor Jawahar Singh. The architecture and carving is in the pierced stone style and the ceiling of cenotaphs are adorned with paintings of the life of Lord Krishna and Suraj Mal. His court poet Sūdan recorded his biography in Sujān Charitra.

Notable institutes named after him include Maharaja Surajmal Institute of Technology, Maharaja Surajmal Brij University, Bharatpur and Surajmal Stadium metro station.

On 10 May every year "Delhi Vijay Diwas" is celebrated after Maharaja Surajmal conquered Delhi on 10 May 1753.

In June 2025 the Uttar Pradesh Yogi Adityanath government has approved the celebration of Agra Vijay Diwas at Agra Fort, commemorating the capture of the fort by Suraj Mal on 12 June 1761.

== See also ==
- Principality of Farrukhnagar
- Maharaja Surajmal Institute
- Maharaja Surajmal Institute of Technology

Suraj Mal Sinsiniwar Dynasty Born: 1707 Died: 1763
Regnal titles
Preceded by Badan Singh	Maharaja of Bharatpur; 1755–1763 AD	Succeeded by Maharaja Jawahar Singh
