= Anandavana =

Coordinates: 14.8211°N 75.4774°E

Anandavana Agadi is located near the city of Haveri, India adjacent to Agadi village. in the southern state of Karnataka, India. Here, Shri Sheshachala Swamy lived.

== Facilities ==
There is a Shiva temple in the village and an annual fair is organised. Within the campus, a Sanskrit school is run by the present Swamiji - Shri Chidambaramurthy Chakravarthy. A monthly Kannada magazine by the name of Sadhbhoda Chandrike has been printed and published in Anandavana since the early 1900s. There is an offset printing press for the purpose of printing Sadhbodha Chandrike. Shri Sheshala Sadguru High School is run by the mutt for the rural students and is aided by the government of Karnataka. It has also run a free health care camp on the first and third Sunday of every month since 2000. Annually the jayanthi (Birthday) of Shri Sheshala Sadguru is celebrated for over a week when thousands of people gather to pull the chariot on the 5th(Panchami) day of the Fair.

== Awards ==
Sadhbodha Chandrike has been conferred the prestigious state award "Karnataka Rajyotsava Prashasti" for the year 2005 in the field of Literature by the Government of Karnataka. Also the "Karnataka Media Academy Award" has been conferred for service rendered to the development of Kannada literature and culture.
