= Ingalhalli =

Coordinates: 15°25′N 75°18′E

- Village
- Interactive map of Ingalhalli
- Country: India
- State: Karnataka
- District: Dharwad

Government
  - Type: Panchayat raj
  - Body: Village Panchayat

Population (2011)
  - Total: 4,917

Languages
  - Official: Kannada
- Time zone: UTC+5:30 (IST)
- ISO 3166 code: IN-KA
- Vehicle registration: KA
- Website: karnataka.gov.in

Ingalahalli is a village in Dharwad district of Karnataka, India.

== Demographics ==
As of the 2011 Census of India there were 1,062 households in Ingalhalli and a total population of 4,917 consisting of 2,485 males and 2,432 females. There were 533 children ages 0–6.
