= Byahatti =

- large village
- Location in Karnataka, India
- Coordinates: 15.4477500°N 75.2065700°E
- Country: India
- State: Karnataka
- District: Dharwad

Population
  - Total: 11,384

Languages
  - Official: Kannada
- Time zone: UTC+5:30 (IST)
- Postal code: 580023

Byahatti is a village in Hubli taluk near Hubli-Dharwad city in Karnataka, India. Byahatti is also used as surname in Karnataka.

== Demographics ==
As of the 2011 Census of India there were 2,395 households in Byahatti and a total population of 11,384 consisting of 5,705 males and 5,679 females. There were 1,288 children ages 0-6.
