= Gopankop =

Coordinates: 15°22′N 75°09′E

- Urban Area
- Interactive map of Gopankop
- Country: India
- State: Karnataka
- District: Dharwad

Government
  - Body: Village Panchayat

Population (2011)
  - Total: 2

Languages
  - Official: Kannada
- Time zone: UTC+5:30 (IST)
- ISO 3166 code: IN-KA
- Vehicle registration: KA
- Website: karnataka.gov.in

Gopankop is a village in Dharwad district of Karnataka, India. According to Census 2011 information the location code or village code of Gopankop village is 602377. Gopankop village is located in Hubli Tehsil of Dharwad district in Karnataka, India. It is situated 6 km (3.7 mi) away from sub-district headquarter Hubli and 26 km (16 mi) away from district headquarter Dharwad.

The total geographical area of village is 1,206.72 hectares (2,981.9 acres). Hubli is nearest town to Gopankop which is approximately 6 km (3.7 mi) away.

== Demographics ==
As of the 2011 Census of India there was 1 household in Gopankop and a total population of 2 consisting of 1 male and 1 female. There were no children ages 0–6.
