= Karadikop =

Karadikop Kaddikoppa
- Village
- Country: India
- State: Karnataka
- District: Dharwad

Government
  - Type: Panchayat raj
  - Body: Gram panchayat

Area
  - Total: 2 km^{2} (0.77 sq mi)
- Demonym: 2,006

Languages
  - Official: Kannada
- Time zone: UTC+5:30 (IST)
- ISO 3166 code: IN-KA
- Vehicle registration: KA
- Website: karnataka.gov.in (in Kannada)

Karadikop, also called Karadikoppa or Kaddikoppa is a village in Hubli taluk, Dharwad district of Karnataka, India. It is 17 kilometres (11 mi) south of Hubli.

It is well known for wrestling. It has many temples like Hanuman, Dyammavva and Maremma. It is well known for unity of Hindus and Muslims. All festivals are celebrated together.

== Demographics ==
At the 2011 Census of India there were 380 households and a population of 2,006 (1,023 males and 983 females). There were 293 children ages 0-6.
