= Chavargudd =

Chavargudda
- Village
- Country: India
- State: Karnataka
- District: Dharwad

Government
  - Type: Panchayat raj
  - Body: Gram panchayat
- Elevation: 600 m (2,000 ft)

Population (2011)
  - Total: 1,204

Languages
  - Official: Kannada
- Time zone: UTC+5:30 (IST)
- ISO 3166 code: IN-KA
- Vehicle registration: KA 25 and KA 63
- Website: karnataka.gov.in

Chavargudda is a village in Dharwad district of Karnataka, India.

== Demographics ==
As of the 2011 Census of India there were 231 households in Chavargudd and a total population of 1,204 consisting of 623 males and 581 females. There were 144 children ages 0-6.

== About ==
chavaragudd village located on the banks of national highway 63(NH 63). 12KM from hubli and 15km from kalagatagi taluk
