= Anchatgeri =

Coordinates: 15°19′N 75°06′E

- Village
- Interactive map of Anchatgeri
- Country: India
- State: Karnataka
- District: Dharwad

Government
  - Body: Village Panchayat

Population (2011)
  - Total: 4,401

Languages
  - Official: Kannada
- Time zone: UTC+5:30 (IST)
- ISO 3166 code: IN-KA
- Vehicle registration: KA
- Website: karnataka.gov.in

Anchatgeri is a village in Dharwad district of Karnataka, India.

== Demographics ==
As of the 2011 Census of India there were 878 households in Anchatgeri and a total population of 4,401 consisting of 2,228 males and 2,173 females. There were 593 children ages 0–6.
