= Warur =

Varur Varur
- Village
- Location in Karnataka, India Varur (India)
- Coordinates: 14.58264°N 75.45929°E
- Country: India
- State: Karnataka
- District: Dharwad
- Talukas: Hubli

Government
  - Type: Panchayat raj
  - Body: Gram panchayat

Population (2011)
  - Total: 3,265

Languages
  - Official: Kannada
- Time zone: UTC+5:30 (IST)
- PIN: 581207
- ISO 3166 code: IN-KA
- Vehicle registration: KA
- Nearest city: Hubballi
- Website: karnataka.gov.in

Varur is a village in the southern state of Karnataka, India.It is located in the Hubli taluk of Dharwad district in Karnataka.

It is present in the outskirts of Hubli city. It is famous for its Navagraha Jain Temple and Varur Engineering College.

== Demographics ==
As of the 2011 Census of India there were 644 households in Warur and a total population of 3,265 consisting of 1,845 males and 1,420 females. There were 407 children ages 0-6.

== See also ==
- Dharwad
- Hubballi
- Navagraha Jain Temple - Varur Hubli
