= Navagraha Jain Temple =

Jain Temple in Karnataka, India

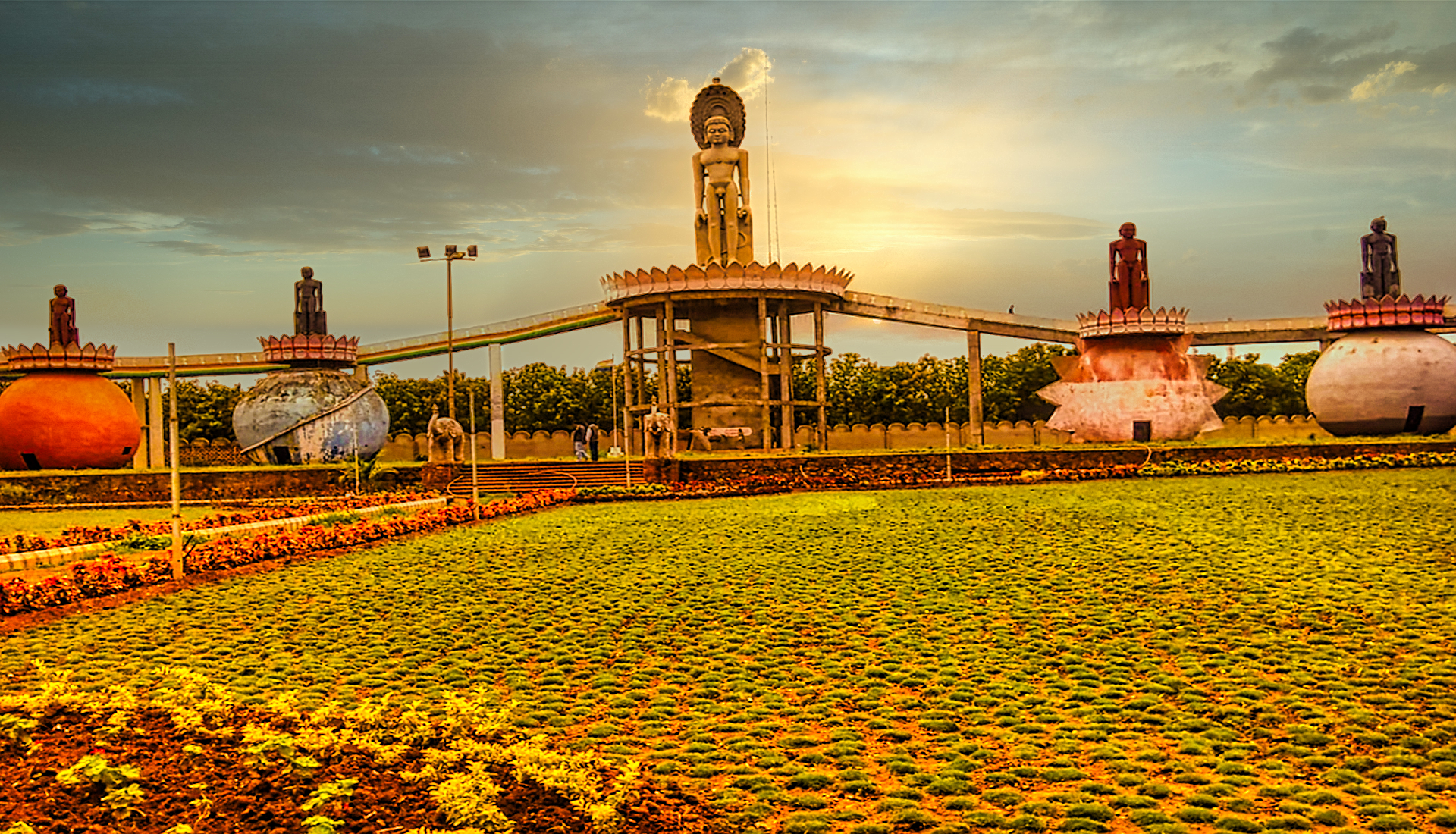
- Statue of Parshvanatha at Navagraha Teertha

- Location within Karnataka

Religion
- Affiliation: Jainism
- Sect: Digambara
- District: Dharwad district
- Deity: Parshvanatha

Location
- Location: Varur
- State: Karnataka
- Country: India
- Coordinates: 15°12′56.46″N 75°8′31.68″E

Architecture
- Creator: Gunadhar Nandi Maharaj
- Established: 2006

Navagraha Jain Temple, also known as Navagraha Teertha or Navagraha Teertha Kshetra, is a Jain temple and pilgrimage centre at Varur near Hubballi in Dharwad district, Karnataka, India. The temple is principally known for its 61-foot (19 m) monolithic statue of Parshvanatha, the 23rd Tirthankara, in the kayotsarga posture.

The complex incorporates representations of nine Tirthankaras, which are associated at the temple with the nine Navagrahas.

== History ==
Construction of Navagraha Teertha began in January 2005. The carving of the monolithic statues was completed within approximately a year. The project was supervised by Jain monk Gunadhar Nandi Maharaj, with the support of Dharmasena Bhattaraka Swamiji and volunteers. The temple complex was developed by the local Jain community at Varur and was conceived as a pilgrimage centre combining representations of nine Jain Tirthankaras with the concept of the nine celestial bodies or Navagrahas.

The temple became an important Jain pilgrimage centre after the installation of its monumental images. A Mahamastakabhisheka of the Parshvanatha statue was organised in January 2007. The development of the pilgrimage centre is particularly associated with Gunadhar Nandi Maharaj, under whose direction the complex was established.

== Parshvanatha statue ==
The principal monument of Navagraha Teertha is a 61-foot (19 m) monolithic statue of Parshvanatha. The statue weighs approximately 185 tonnes and is installed on a 48-foot (15 m) pedestal, giving the monument a total height of approximately 109 feet (33 m). Parshvanatha is represented standing in the kayotsarga posture. The serpent canopy above the Tirthankara identifies the figure as Parshvanatha. The statue forms the visual centre of the temple complex and is accompanied by monumental representations of eight other Tirthankaras. The Parshvanatha image has been described as the tallest statue of Parshvanatha in India.

== Navagraha concept ==
A distinctive feature of the temple is the association of nine Tirthankaras with the nine Navagrahas. Karnataka Tourism describes the complex as bringing together the Jain religious tradition with the concept of nine celestial bodies.

The nine Tirthankaras represented at the complex are:

S. No.	Tirthankar	Planet
1	Padmaprabhu	Sun
2	Chandraprabhu	Moon
3	Māllīnātha	Mercury
4	Pushpadanta	Venus
5	Vasupujya	Mars
6	Mahavira	Jupiter
7	Munisuvrata	Saturn
8	Neminatha	Rahu
9	Parshvanath	Ketu

The monumental Parshvanatha represents the association with Ketu, while the remaining eight Tirthankaras are represented by separate statues in the complex.

== Temple complex ==
Navagraha Teertha is situated at Varur along the Pune–Bengaluru highway near Hubballi. The pilgrimage centre occupies a large campus surrounding the monumental Parshvanatha statue. The other eight Tirthankara statues are arranged as part of the Navagraha scheme. The monumental scale of the Parshvanatha image makes the temple complex a prominent landmark in the Varur area.

== Religious significance ==
Navagraha Teertha is an important Digambara Jain pilgrimage centre in northern Karnataka. The religious conception of the complex associates nine Tirthankaras with the nine celestial bodies. The Mahamastakabhisheka, a ceremonial anointment of the monumental Tirthankara image, is among the principal religious ceremonies performed at the site.

== See also ==
- Gommateshwara statue
- Statue of Ahimsa
- Bawangaja
