= Agadi, Uttara Kannada =

Agadi
- Village
- Location in Karnataka, India Location in India
- Coordinates: 15.0668°N 74.9924°E
- Country: India
- State: Karnataka
- District: Uttara Kannada
- Talukas: Mundgod

Government
  - Body: Village Panchayat

Languages
  - Official: Kannada
- Time zone: UTC+5:30 (IST)
- Nearest city: Uttara Kannada
- Civic agency: Village Panchayat

Agadi (Mundgod) is a village in the southern state of Karnataka in India. It is located in the Mundgod taluk and it is under kawar districts in Uttara Kannada.

== See also ==
- Uttara Kannada
- Districts of Karnataka
