= Belur Industrial Area =

- Neighbourhood
- Interactive map of Belur Industrial Area
- Location in Karnataka, India
- Coordinates: 15.509520°N 74.914532°E
- Country: India
- State: Karnataka
- City: Dharwad

Government
  - Type: Municipal corporation
  - Body: Hubli-Dharwad Municipal Corporation

Lagoon
  - Official: Kannada
- Time zone: UTC+5:30 (IST)
- Postal code: 580011
- Vehicle registration: KA-25

Belur Industrial Area (Abbreviation : BIA) is an industrial area of the Dharwad city in India and it is one of the biggest industrial areas in Karnataka. lies on the Dharwad-Belgaum Highway. It houses small, medium, and large-scale industries. The industrial area is known for engineering, electrical goods such as: CNC Machine tools, GDC dies & moulds transformers, motors and generators, textile (silk), hydraulics, machine tool industries and Rubber moulding industries.
