= Agadi, Haveri =

Agadi
- village
- Location in Karnataka, India Agadi (India)
- Coordinates: 14.819°N 75.469°E
- Country: India
- State: Karnataka
- District: Haveri
- Talukas: Haveri

Government
  - Body: Village Panchayat

Languages
  - Official: Kannada
- Time zone: UTC+5:30 (IST)
- Postal code: 581128
- Nearest city: Haveri
- Civic agency: Village Panchayat

Agadi is a village in the southern state of Karnataka, India. It is located in the Haveri taluk of Haveri district in Karnataka.

== See also ==
- Anandavana
- Districts of Karnataka
- Haveri
