= B.Aralikatti =

B.Aralikatti Bujaruk
- Village
- Country: India
- State: Karnataka
- District: Dharwad
- Talukas: Hubli

Government
  - Type: Panchayat raj
  - Body: Gram panchayat

Population (2011)
  - Total: 4,357

Languages
  - Official: Kannada
- Time zone: UTC+5:30 (IST)
- PIN: 581207
- Telephone code: 0836
- ISO 3166 code: IN-KA
- Vehicle registration: KA-25
- Nearest city: Hubli
- Vidhan Sabha constituency: Kundagol
- Website: karnataka.gov.in

B.Aralikatti is a village in Dharwad district of Karnataka, India.

== Demographics ==
As of the 2011 Census of India there were 857 households in B.Aralikatti and a total population of 4,357 consisting of 2,254 males and 2,103 females. There were 505 children ages 0-6.
