= Bengeri =

Coordinates: 15°22′N 75°09′E

- Village
- Interactive map of Bengeri
- Country: India
- State: Karnataka
- District: Dharwad

Languages
  - Official: Kannada
- Time zone: UTC+5:30 (IST)
- Postal code: 580020
- ISO 3166 code: IN-KA
- Vehicle registration: KA
- Website: karnataka.gov.in

Bengeri is a village in the Hubballi City of Karnataka, India.

It is well known for its national famous "Khadi Gramodyog" i.e. the only official & aunthorised manufacturer of Indian Flag in the whole country. It also has number of small and local industries involving in the food sector like Chikki, Barfi, Soda factories. These are sent through almost all over Dharwad district.
