= Chebbi =

Chabbi
- village
- Location in Karnataka, India Chabbi (India)
- Coordinates: 14.58264°N 75.45929°E
- Country: India
- State: Karnataka
- District: Dharwad
- Talukas: Hubli

Government
  - Body: Gram panchayat

Population (2011)
  - Total: 4,536

Languages
  - Official: Kannada
- Time zone: UTC+5:30 (IST)
- PIN: 581207
- ISO 3166 code: IN-KA
- Vehicle registration: KA
- Nearest city: Dharwad
- Website: karnataka.gov.in

Chabbi is a village in Dharwad district of Karnataka, India.

== Demographics ==
As of the 2011 Census of India there were 1,007 households in Chabbi and a total population of 4,536 consisting of 2,316 males and 2,220 females. There were 591 children ages 0-6.

== See also ==
- Dharwad
- Districts of Karnataka
