= A. Timmasagar =

- village
- Location in Karnataka, India A. Timmasagar (India)
- Coordinates: 15.34453°N 75.135277°E
- Country: India
- State: Karnataka
- District: Dharwad
- Talukas: Hubli

Government
  - Type: Panchayat raj
  - Body: Village Panchayat

Population (2011)
  - Total: 850

Languages
  - Official: Kannada
- Time zone: UTC+5:30 (IST)
- ISO 3166 code: IN-KA
- Vehicle registration: KA
- Nearest city: Dharwad
- Civic agency: Village Panchayat
- Website: karnataka.gov.in

A. Timmasagar is a village in the southern state of Karnataka, India. It is located in the Hubli taluk of Dharwad district in Karnataka.

== Demographics ==
As of the 2011 Census of India there were 205 households in A. Timmasagar and a total population of 850 consisting of 445 males and 405 females. There were 108 children ages 0–6.

== See also ==
- Dharwad
- Districts of Karnataka
