= Katnur =

Coordinates: 15°16′N 75°07′E

Katnur 98/B12
- Village
- Interactive map of Katnur
- Country: India
- State: Karnataka
- District: Dharwad

Government
  - Body: Village Panchayat

Population (2011)
  - Total: 1,890

Languages
  - Official: Kannada
- Time zone: UTC+5:30 (IST)
- ISO 3166 code: IN-KA
- Vehicle registration: KA
- Website: karnataka.gov.in

Katnur is a village in Dharwad district of Karnataka, India.

== Demographics ==
As of the 2011 Census of India there were 363 households in Katnur and a total population of 1,890, consisting of 961 males and 929 females. There were 223 children ages 0–6.
