= Kamplikop =

Coordinates: 15°13′N 75°06′E

- Village
- Interactive map of Kamplikop
- Country: India
- State: Karnataka
- District: Dharwad

Government
  - Body: Village Panchayat

Population (2011)
  - Total: 1,002

Languages
  - Official: Kannada
- Time zone: UTC+5:30 (IST)
- ISO 3166 code: IN-KA
- Vehicle registration: KA
- Website: karnataka.gov.in

Kamplikop is a village in Dharwad district of Karnataka, India.

== Demographics ==
As of the 2011 Census of India there were 226 households in Kamplikop and a total population of 1,002 consisting of 527 males and 475 females. There were 127 children ages 0–6.
