= Shiraguppi =

- village
- Location in Karnataka, India Shiraguppi (India)
- Coordinates: 16°36′55.089″N 74°42′47.281″E
- Country: India
- State: Karnataka
- District: Belgaum
- Talukas: Kagwad (Karnataka)

Population (2001)
  - Total: 9,189

Languages
  - Official: Kannada,
- Time zone: UTC+5:30 (IST)
- PIN: 591242
- Telephone code: 08339
- Vehicle registration: KA 23
- Nearest city: Chikodi & Athani
- Lok Sabha constituency: Chikodi
- Vidhan Sabha constituency: Kagwad
- Climate: Good (Köppen)

Shiraguppi is a village in the southern state of Karnataka, India, in the Kagwad taluk of Belgaum district.

== Demographics ==
According to the 2001 Indian census, Shiraguppi had a population of 9189 with 4676 males and 4513 females.
