= Bhandiwada =

Bhandiwad
- Village
- Location in Karnataka, India Bhandiwad (India)
- Coordinates: 15.352°N 75.265°E
- Country: India
- State: Karnataka
- District: Dharwad

Languages
  - Official: Kannada
- Time zone: UTC+5:30 (IST)

Bhandiwad is a village in Dharwad district of Karnataka, India. The village is known for a Hanuman temple.
