= Palikop =

Coordinates: 15°11′N 75°07′E

Palikoppa
- Village
- Interactive map of Palikoppa
- Country: India
- State: Karnataka
- District: Dharwad

Government
  - Body: Village Panchayat

Population (2011)
  - Total: 1,014

Languages
  - Official: Kannada
- Time zone: UTC+5:30 (IST)
- Postal code: 581207
- ISO 3166 code: IN-KA
- Vehicle registration: KA
- Website: karnataka.gov.in

Palikoppa is a village in Dharwad district of Karnataka, India.

== Demographics ==
As of the 2011 Census of India there were 197 households in Palikoppa and a total population of 1,014 consisting of 520 males and 494 females. There were 105 children ages 0–6.

Assembly constituency : Kundgol assembly constituency Lok Sabha constituency : Dharwad parliamentary constituency
