= Lakamanahalli =

- Neighbourhood/Suburb
- Location in Karnataka, India
- Coordinates: 15.437823°N 75.029125°E
- Country: India
- State: Karnataka
- District: Dharwad
- City: Dharwad

Government
  - Type: Municipal corporation
  - Body: HDMC

Languages
  - Official: Kannada
- Time zone: UTC+5:30 (IST)
- ISO 3166 code: IN-KA
- Vehicle registration: KA-25
- Website: karnataka.gov.in

Lakamanahalli is a suburb in Dharwad city, Dharwad district of Karnataka, India. It is an industrial area for small scale industries which are involved in clothing, silk, textile and rubber moulding. It is located about 6 km from the centre of the city. Lakkamanahalli is connected to HDBRTS corridor and recently to Samparka BRTS bus service in December 2022.
