= Manua Gram Panchayat =

Manua
- Gram Panchayat
- Location in Bihar, India
- Coordinates: 25°39′53.0″N 85°14′35.3″E
- Country: India
- State: Bihar
- District: vaishali
- Assembly Constituency: hajipur assembly constituency (AC.123)

Languages
  - Official: Hindi
- Time zone: UTC+5:30 (IST)
- ISO 3166 code: IN-BR

Manua is a Gram Panchayat in Hajipur, Vaishali district, Bihar, India.

== Geography ==
This panchayat is located at 25°45′09.7″N 85°12′08.5″E

== Villages ==
There are villages in this panchayat

s.n	villages
1	Phulhara Ishak
2	Chak Dindayal Chak Rafik
3	Chak Ahmad
4	Salemabad
5	Shahzadpur Jitwar Chak
6	Manua Bhagwan
7	Manua Alah Baksh
8	Manua Khalak Dad
9	Shahzadpur Jitwar
10	Manua
11	Murgia Chak
12	Chak Khudan
13	Rae Dih
14	Shiurampur
15	Chak Hafiz Amanullah
16	Chak Mahmudpur Ali Urf Hargobi
