= Bommasamudra =

Coordinates: 14°19′N 76°42′E

- Village
- Interactive map of Bommasamudra
- Country: India
- State: Karnataka
- District: chitradurga

Government
  - Type: Panchayat raj
  - Body: Gram panchayat

Population (2011)
  - Total: 1,405

Languages
  - Official: Kannada
- Time zone: UTC+5:30 (IST)
- ISO 3166 code: IN-KA
- Vehicle registration: KA
- Website: karnataka.gov.in

Bommasamudra is a village in Dharwad district of Karnataka, India.

== Demographics ==
As of the 2011 Census of India there were 268 households in Bommasamudra and a total population of 1,405 consisting of 724 males and 681 females. There were 219 children ages 0–6.
