= Halyal =

Halyal ಹಲ್ಯಾಳ Hallihal
- Village
- Country: India
- State: Karnataka
- District: Belgaum
- Talukas: Athani

Government
  - Body: Gram panchayat

Languages
  - Official: Kannada
- Time zone: UTC+5:30 (IST)
- Postal code: 591304
- Vehicle registration: KA 23

Halyal is a village in Belgaum district in the southern state of Karnataka, India. It is located 121 kilometres (75 mi) north of Belgaum, 10 kilometres (6.2 mi) from Athani, and 577 kilometres (359 mi) from the state capital of Bangalore.

Halyal's Pin code is 591304. The postal head office is located at 15.4589° N, 75.0078° E Athani. This place has one petrol pump named Shree Mallikarjun Petroleum, operated by Nayara Energy, owned by R. L. Patil and K. L. Patil.

Nearby villages include Nadi Ingalagaon (3 km), Hulagabali (4 km), Sankonatti (6 km), Naganur P K (7 km), Saptasagar (9 km). Halyal is surrounded by Raybag Taluk and Jamkhandi Taluk. Athani Terdal, Rabkavi Banhatti, Mahalingpur, and Mudalgiare are nearby cities.

== Population ==
The population of Halyal is 4,525 (2,381 men and 2,144 women and 790 houses).
