= Sherewad =

- Village
- Country: India
- State: Karnataka
- District: Hubli Suburban, Dharwad

Government
  - Body: Gram panchayat

Population (2011)
  - Total: 4,415

Languages
  - Official: Kannada
- Time zone: UTC+5:30 (IST)
- Postal code: 580028
- ISO 3166 code: IN-KA
- Vehicle registration: KA25, KA63
- Website: karnataka.gov.in

Sherewad is a village in Hubli Suburban, Dharwad district of Karnataka, India.

== Demographics ==
As of the 2011 Census of India there were 893 households in Sherewad and a total population of 4,415 consisting of 2,232 males and 2,183 females. There were 539 children ages 0–6.
