= Bairagarh, Berasia =

Bairagarh
- town
- Location within Madhya Pradesh Location within India
- Coordinates: 23.664339°N 77.537324°E
- Country: India
- State: Madhya Pradesh
- District: Bhopal
- Tehsil: Berasia

Population (2011)
  - Total: 1,036
- Time zone: UTC+5:30 (IST)
- ISO 3166 code: MP-IN
- Census code: 482193

Bairagarh is a locality in the Bhopal district of Madhya Pradesh, India. It is located in the Berasia tehsil, near Berasia-Vidisha road and the Dungaria dam.

== Demographics ==
According to the 2011 census of India, Bairagarh has 214 households. The effective literacy rate (i.e. the literacy rate of population excluding children aged 6 and below) is 69.84%.

Demographics (2011 Census)
	Total	Male	Female
Population	1036	548	488
Children aged below 6 years	174	96	78
Scheduled caste	184	93	91
Scheduled tribe	0	0	0
Literates	602	367	235
Workers (all)	401	280	121
Main workers (total)	169	154	15
Main workers: Cultivators	127	123	4
Main workers: Agricultural labourers	28	21	7
Main workers: Household industry workers	0	0	0
Main workers: Other	14	10	4
Marginal workers (total)	232	126	106
Marginal workers: Cultivators	31	16	15
Marginal workers: Agricultural labourers	200	109	91
Marginal workers: Household industry workers	0	0	0
Marginal workers: Others	1	1	0
Non-workers	635	268	367
