= Mantur =

- village
- Location in Karnataka, India Mantur (India)
- Coordinates: 16.3809°N 75.3774°E
- Country: India
- State: Karnataka
- District: Bagalkot
- Talukas: Mudhol

Government
  - Type: Panchayat raj
  - Body: Gram panchayat

Population (2011)
  - Total: 10,500

Languages
  - Official: Kannada
- Time zone: UTC+5:30 (IST)
- ISO 3166 code: IN-KA
- Vehicle registration: KA
- Website: karnataka.gov.in

Mantur is a village in the southern state of Karnataka, India. It is located in the Mudhol taluk of Bagalkot district in Karnataka.

== Demographics ==
As of 2001 India census, Mantur had a population of 6297 with 3,174 males and 3,123 females.

== See also ==
- Bagalkot
- Districts of Karnataka
