= Agadi, Dharwad =

Agadi
- village
- Location in Karnataka, India Agadi (India)
- Coordinates: 14.58263°N 75.45928°E
- Country: India
- State: Karnataka
- District: Dharwad
- Talukas: Hubli

Government
  - Type: Panchayat raj
  - Body: Village Panchayat

Population (2011)
  - Total: 2,532

Languages
  - Official: Kannada
- Time zone: UTC+5:30 (IST)
- PIN: 581207
- ISO 3166 code: IN-KA
- Vehicle registration: KA
- Nearest city: Dharwad
- Civic agency: Village Panchayat
- Website: karnataka.gov.in

Agadi is a village in the southern state of Karnataka, India. It is located in the Hubli taluk of Dharwad district.

== Demographics ==
As of the 2011 Census of India there were 492 households in Agadi and a total population of 2,532 consisting of 1,344 males and 1,188 females. There were 335 children ages 0–6.

== See also ==
- Dharwad
- Districts of Karnataka
