= Tarihal =

Coordinates: 15°21′N 75°03′E

- Village
- Interactive map of Tarihal
- Country: India
- State: Karnataka
- District: Dharwad
- Talukas: Hubli

Languages
  - Official: Kannada
- Time zone: UTC+5:30 (IST)

Tarihal is a village in Dharwad district of Karnataka, India.
