= List of battles involving the Mughal Empire =

The Mughal Empire was founded by Babur (r. 1526–1530), a Central Asian ruler descended from the Turco-Mongol conqueror Timur on his father's side and Genghis Khan on his mother's. After being ousted from his ancestral domains in Central Asia, Babur turned to India to pursue his ambitions. Establishing himself in Kabul, he advanced southward in India through the Khyber Pass. Babur's forces defeated Ibrahim Lodhi in the First Battle of Panipat. By this time, however, Lodhi's empire was already weakening, while the Rajput confederacy led by the capable Rana Sanga of Mewar, remained the strongest power in the northern India.

Rana Sanga defeated Babur in the Battle of Bayana. However, in a decisive battle fought near Agra, Babur’s Timurid forces defeated Sanga’s Rajput army in the Battle of Khanwa. This battle was one of the most significant and historic battles in Indian history, as it determined the fate of Northern India for the next two centuries. The Mughal Empire reached its greatest extent during the reign of Aurangzeb.

== Babur ==
Name of conflict(time)	Belligerent	opponent	outcome
First Battle of Panipat (21 April 1526)	Mughal Empire	Delhi Sultanate	Mughal victory: Establishment of the Mughal Empire
Battle of Bayana (21 February 1527)	Mughal Empire	Rajput confederation	Rajput victory
Battle of Khanwa (16 March 1527)	Mughal Empire	Rajput confederation	Mughal victory
Battle of Chanderi (20 January 1528)	Mughal Empire	Rajput confederation	Mughal victory
Battle of Ghaghra (6 May 1529)	Mughal Empire	Bengal Sultanate	Mughal victory

== Humayun ==
Name of conflict(time)	Belligerent	opponent	outcome
Battle of Mandrael (November 1534)	Mughal Empire	Gujarat Sultanate	Mughal victory
Battle of Chausa (26 June 1539)	Mughal Empire	Sur Empire	Sur victory
Battle of Kannauj (17 May 1540)	Mughal Empire	Sur Empire	Sur victory: Humayun defeated by Sher Shah Suri, fleed from India and took refuge in Safavid Persia
Battle of Machhiwara (15 May 1555)	Mughal Empire	Sur Empire	Mughal victory
Battle of Sirhind (22 June 1555)	Mughal Empire	Sur Empire	Mughal victory: Re-establishment of Mughal Empire

== Akbar ==
Name of conflict(time)	Belligerent	opponent	outcome
Battle of Tughlaqabad (7 October 1556)	Mughal Empire	Sur Empire	Hemchandra's victory
Second Battle of Panipat (5 November 1556)	Mughal Empire	Sur Empire	Mughal victory
Siege of Mankot (January – 25 July 1557)	Mughal Empire	Sur loyalists	Mughal victory
Mughal conquest of Garha (1564–1567)	Mughal Empire	Garha Kingdom	Mughal victory
Mughal conquest of Malwa (1560–1570)	Mughal Empire	Malwa Sultanate	Mughal victory
Battle of Thanesar (1567) (9 April 1567)	Mughal Empire	Two Great warrior clans Sanyasis	Mughal victory
Siege of Chittorgarh (1567–1568)	Mughal Empire	Mewar Kingdom	Mughal victory
Siege of Ranthambore (1568) (8 February – 21 March 1568)	Mughal Empire	Rajput of Ranthambore Fort	Mughal victory
Mughal conquest of Sindh (1572–1592)	Mughal Empire	Tarkhan dynasty	Mughal victory: Sindh Falls to Mughal Empire
Akbar's conquest of Gujarat (1572–1573)	Mughal Empire	Gujarat Sultanate	Mughal victory: Mughal annexation of Gujarat
Mughal invasion of Bengal (1572–1576)	Mughal Empire	Sultanate of Bengal	Mughal victory: Mughal Annexation of Bengal
Battle of Tukaroi (1575)	Mughal Empire	Sultanate of Bengal	Mughal victory
Battle of Raj Mahal (1576)	Mughal Empire	Sultanate of Bengal	Mughal victory
Battle of Haldighati (1576)	Mughal Empire	Kingdom of Mewar	Mughal victory
Mughal conquest of Kashmir (1585–1589)	Mughal Empire	Kashmir Sultanate; Supported by: Kishtwar Kingdom	Mughal victory: Mughal Annexed Kashmir
Battle of the Malandari Pass (1586)	Mughal Empire	Yousufzai Afghans	Yousufzai Afghans victory: Raja Birbal was killed with entire Mughal forces.
Battle of Hastivanj (1586)	Mughal Empire	Kashmir Sultanate	Mughal victory: Dissolution of Kashmir Sultanate
Battle of Bhuchar Mori (1591)	Mughal Empire	Gujarat Sultanate	Mughal victory: Dissolution of Gujarat Sultanate

== Jahangir ==
Name of conflict(time)	Belligerent	opponent	outcome
Siege of Kandahar (1605-1606)	Mughal Empire	Safavid Empire	Mughal victory
Battle of Dewair (1606)	Mughal Empire	Kingdom of Mewar	Rajput victory
Conquest of Bakla (1611)	Mughal Empire	Chandradwip Kingdom	Mughal victory: Chandradwip Kingdom formally annexed to Mughal Bengal
Battle of Bharali (1615 CE)	Mughal Empire	Ahom Kingdom	Ahom victory
Battle of Samdhara (1616 CE)	Mughal Empire	Ahom Kingdom	Ahom victory
Battle of Rohilla (1621)	Mughal Empire	Sikhs	Sikh victory: Guru Hargobind led Sikhs to defeat Mughal army
Mughal-Safavid War (1622-1623)	Mughal Empire	Safavid Empire	Safavid victory: Kanadhar recaptured by Safavids
Battle of Bhatvadi (1624)	Mughal Empire: Bijapur Sultanate	Ahmednagar Sultanate	Ahmednagar victory

== Shah Jahan ==
Name of conflict(time)	Belligerent	opponent	outcome
Siege of Hooghly (1632)	Mughal Empire	Portuguese Empire	Mughal victory
Siege of Daulatabad (1633)	Mughal Empire	Bijapur Sultanate; Ahmednagar Sultanate	Mughal victory'
Siege of Parenda (1634)	Mughal Empire	Bijapur Sultanate; Ahmednagar Sultanate	Bijapur-Ahmednagar victory
Battle of Amritsar (1634)	Mughal Empire	Sikhs	Sikh victory
Battle of Lahira (1634)	[ Mughal Empire	Sikhs	Sikh victory
Battle of Kartarpur (1635)	Mughal Empire	Sikhs	Sikh victory
Siege of Nagpur (1637)	Mughal Empire	Kingdom of Deogarh	Mughal victory'
Mughal Central Asia Campaign (1646–1647)	Mughal Empire	Khanate of Bukhara	Indecisive
Siege of Kandahar (1648–1649)	Mughal Empire	Safavid Iran	Safavid victory
Sieges of Kandahar (1649–1653)	Mughal Empire	Safavid Iran	Safavid victory
Siege of Bidar (1657)	Mughal Empire	Bijapur Sulatnate	Mughal victory
Raid of Ahmednagar (1657)	Mughal Empire	Maratha Confederacy	Mughal victory
Battle of Dharmat (1658)	Mughal Empire	Rebels led by Aurangzeb	Aurangzeb's victory
Battle of Samugarh (1658)	Dara Shikoh; Shah Jahan	Aurangzeb	Aurangzeb's victory: Coronation of the Aurangzeb as Mughal Emperor
Battle of Khajwa (1659)	Aurangzeb	Shah Shuja	Aurangzeb's victory

== Aurangzeb ==
Name of conflict (time)	Belligerent	opponent	outcome
Battle of Chakan (1660)	Mughal Empire	Maratha Kingdom	Mughal victory
Mir Jumla's invasion of Assam (1663)	Mughal Empire	Ahom Kingdom	Mughal victory Mughals takeover the capital Garhgaon
Battle of Surat (1665)	Mughal Empire	Maratha Kingdom	Maratha victory
Battle of Purandar (1665)	Mughal Empire	Maratha Kingdom	Mughal victory
Raid of Ahmednagar (1657)	Mughal Empire	Maratha Kingdom	Mughal victory
Jat Rebellion (1667–1723)	Mughal Empire	Jats	Mughal victory'
Battle of Alaboi (1669)	Mughal Empire	Ahom Kingdom	Mughal victory
Battle of Tilpat (1669)	Mughal Empire	Jats	Mughal victory'
Battle of Sinhagad (1670)	Mughal Empire	Maratha Kingdom	Maratha victory
Battle of Saraighat (1671)	Mughal Empire	Ahom Kingdom	Ahom victory
Battle of Salher (1672)	Mughal Empire	Maratha Kingdom	Maratha victory
Battle of Shivneri Fort (1673)	Mughal Empire	Maratha Kingdom	Mughal victory
Battle of Umrani (1673)	Mughal Empire	Maratha Kingdom	Mughal victory
Siege of Shivneri Fort (1678)	Mughal Empire	Maratha Kingdom	Mughal victory
Battle of Bhupalgarh (1679)	Mughal Empire	Maratha Kingdom	Mughal victory
Rathore rebellion (1679–1707)	Kingdom of Marwar and Kingdom of Mewar	Mughal Empire	First Phase-Mughal victory Second Phase-Rajput victory
Sacking of Burhanpur (1681)	Mughal Empire	Maratha Kingdom	Maratha victory
Siege of Janjira (1682)	Mughal Empire	Maratha Kingdom	Mughal victory
Battle of Itakhuli (1682)	Ahom Kingdom	Mughal Empire	Ahom victory
Battle of Kalyan (1682–1683)	Mughal Empire	Maratha Kingdom	Mughal victory
Maratha invasion of Goa (1683)	Mughal Empire; Portuguese India	Maratha Kingdom	Inconclusive
Siege of Ramsej (1682–1688)	Mughal Empire	Maratha Kingdom	Mughal victory
Mughal invasions of Konkan (1684)	Mughal Empire	Maratha Kingdom	Maratha victory
Anglo-Mughal War (1684–1690)	Mughal Empire	British EIC	Mughal victory
Siege of Bijapur (1685– 1686)	Mughal Empire	Bijapur Sultanate	Mughal victory: Mughal Empire annexed all territories ruled by Adil Shahi Dynasty
Siege of Golconda (1687)	Mughal Empire	Golconda Sultanate	Mughal victory: Mughal Empire annexed Qutb Shahi dynasty
Battle of Wai (1687)	Mughal Empire	Maratha Kingdom	Maratha victory
Battle of Raigarh (1689)	Mughal Empire	Maratha Kingdom	Mughal victory
Battle of Athani (1690)	Mughal Empire	Maratha Kingdom	Maratha victory
Battle of Nadaun (1691)	Mughal Empire	Sikhs; Chandel of Kahlur	Sikh And Chandel victory
Battle of Guler (1696)	Mughal Empire	Sikhs	Sikh victory
Siege of Jinji (1698)	Mughal Empire; Madurai Nayak Dynasty	Maratha Kingdom	Mughal- Madurai victory
Battle of Paranda (1699)	Mughal Empire	Maratha Kingdom	Mughal victory
Battle of Satara (1699–1700)	Mughal Empire	Maratha Kingdom	Mughal victory
Battle of Anandpur (1700)	Mughal Empire	Khalsa	Khalsa victory
Battle of Anandpur (1701)	Mughal Empire	Khalsa	Khalsa victory
Battle of Khelna (1701–1702)	Mughal Empire	Maratha Kingdom	Mughal victory
Battle of Nirmohgarh (1702)	Mughal Empire	Khalsa	Khalsa victory
Battle of Basoli (1702)	Mughal Empire	Khalsa	Khalsa victory
First Battle of Chamkaur (1702)	Mughal Empire	Khalsa	Khalsa victory
Battle of Raigarh (1703-1704)	Mughal Empire	Maratha Kingdom	Mughal victory
Battle of Sironj (1704)	Mughal Empire	Maratha Kingdom	Mughal victory
Battle of Torna (1704)	Mughal Empire	Maratha Kingdom	Mughal victory
Battle of Anandpur (1704)	Mughal Empire	Khalsa	Mughal victory
Battle of Sarsa (1704)	Mughal Empire	Khalsa	Mughal victory
Battle of Chamkaur (1704)	Mughal Empire	Khalsa	Mughal victory: Mughal Army failed to capture Guru Gobind Singh
Siege of Wagingera (1704)	Mughal Empire	Maratha Kingdom	Mughal victory
Battle of Muktsar (1705)	Mughal Empire	Khalsa	Khalsa victory

== Bahadur Shah I and Farrukhsiyar ==
Name of conflict(time)	Belligerents	opponent	outcome
Battle of Jajau (1707)	Mughals under Bahadur Shah I Supported by Khalsa (Sikhs)	Mughals under Azam Shah	Bahadur Shah victory: Part of Mughal war of succession (1707); Bahadur Shah I was crowned as the Mughal emperor
Rajput Rebellion 1708-1710 (21 April 1708 – 11 June 1710)	Kingdom of Marwar; Kingdom of Amber; Supported By; Kingdom of Mewar	Mughal Empire	Rajput victory
Battle of Sonipat (1709)	Khalsa	Mughal Empire	Khalsa victory
Battle of Samana (1709)	Khalsa	Mughal Empire	Khalsa victory
Battle of Chappar Chiri; 1710)	Khalsa	Mughal Empire	Khalsa victory
Battle of Sadhaura (1710)	Khalsa	Mughal Empire	Khalsa victory
Battle of Rahon (1710)	Khalsa	Mughal Empire	Khalsa victory
Battle of Jalalabad (1710)	Mughal Empire	Khalsa	Khalsa victory
Battle of Thanesar (1710)	Khalsa	Mughal Empire	Khalsa victory
Battle of Lohgarh (1710)	Khalsa	Mughal Empire	Mughal victory
Battle of Thanesar (1710)	Khalsa	Mughal Empire	Mughal victory
Siege of Lohgarh (1710)	Khalsa	Mughal Empire	Mughal victory
Battle of Bandanwara (1711)	Mewar Kingdom	Mughal Empire	Mewar victory
Battle of Jammu (1712)	Khalsa	Mughal Empire	Mughal victory
Battle of Lohgarh (1712)	Khalsa	Mughal Empire	Khalsa victory
Battle of Kiri Pathan (1714)	Khalsa	Mughal Empire	Khalsa victory
Siege of Gurdas Nangal (1715)	Khalsa	Mughal Empire	Mughal victory: Mughal army captured Banda Singh Bahadur after 8 month long siege

== Muhammad Shah ==
Name of conflict(time)	Belligerents	opponent	outcome
Battle of Balapur (1720)	Mughal Empire(Nizamul Mulk)	Sayyid Brothers; Maratha Confederacy	Mughal victory
Battle of Fatehpur Sikri (1721)	Mughal Empire	Jats	Mughal victory
Battle of Shakar Kheda (1724)	Mughal Empire	Nizam of Hyderabad; Maratha Empire	Nizam-Maratha victory
Battle of Palkhed (1728)	Mughal Empire; Nizam of Hyderabad	Maratha Confederacy	Maratha victory
Battle of Bundelkhand (1729)	Maratha Confederacy: Kingdom of Bundelkhand	Mughal Empire	Maratha-Bundela victory
Battle of Bhopal (1737)	Mughal Empire; Hyderabad Nizamshahi; Kingdom of Awadh; Kingdom of Jaipur; Kingdom of Kota; Other Mughal chiefs	Maratha Confederacy	Maratha victory
Battle of Khyber Pass (1738)	Mughal Empire	Afsharid dynasty	Persian victory
Battle of Karnal (1739)	Mughal Empire; Hyderabad; Oudh	Afsharid Iran; Kingdom of Kakheti	Afsharid dynasty victory: Delhi Sacked and Looted; Decline of Mughal Empire
Battle of Gangwana (1741)	Kingdom of Jaipur; Reinforced By; Mughal Empire; Kingdom of Bharatpur; Kingdom of Bundi; Kingdom of Kota; Kingdom of Karauli; Kingdom of Shahpura	Rathores of Bakht Singh	Indecisive
Battle of Lahore (1748)	Mughal Empire	Durrani Empire	Durrani Empire victory
Battle of Manupur (1748)	Mughal Empire; Kingdom of Jaipur Sikh Misls	Durrani Empire	Mughal Alliance victory: Ahmad Shah Durrani first invasion repulsed by Mughals alliance

== Later battles of the Mughal Empire during its decline ==
Name of conflict(time)	Belligerents	opponent	outcome
Battle of Lahore (1752)	Mughal Empire	Durrani Empire	Durrani victory
Plunder of Old Delhi (1753)	Mughal Empire Maratha Confederacy; Kingdom of Rohilkhand	Kingdom of Bharatpur; Oudh State	Maratha victory
Battle of Kumher (1754)	Kingdom of Bharatpur	Mughal Empire; Maratha Confederacy	Bharatpur victory
Bengal War (1756–1765)	Mughal Empire; Nawab of Audh; Bengal Subah	British East India Company	British victory
Sack of Delhi (1757)	Mughal Empire	Durrani Empire	Durrani victory: Kashmir, Lahore, Multan, Sirhind, and all territories west of the Indus river are annexed by the Durrani Empire
Battle of Delhi (1757)	Mughal Empire; Kingdom of Rohilkhand	Maratha Confederacy	Maratha victory
Battle of Taraori (1759)	Maratha Confederacy; Mughal Empire	Durrani Empire	Durrani victory
Siege of Agra (1761)	Mughal Empire	Bharatpur State	Bharatpur victory
Battle of Buxar (1764)	Mughal Empire; Nawab of Audh; Bengal Subah	British East India Company	British victory
Battle of Delhi (1764)	Kingdom of Bharatpur; Supported by Dal Khalsa	Kingdom of Rohilkhand; Mughal Empire	Bharatpur–Maratha victory
Capture of Delhi (1771)	Maratha Confederacy	Mughal Empire; Kingdom of Rohilkhand	Maratha victory
Battle of Delhi (1783)	Mughal Empire	Sikh Misls	Sikhs victory: Construction of Gurudwara Bangla Sahib, Gurudwara Sis Ganj Sahib
Siege of Delhi (1804)	Maratha Confederacy	Mughal Empire; British East India Company	British victory
Battle of Badli-ki-Serai (1857)	Mughal Empire	East India Company	British victory
Battle of Najafgarh (1857)	Mughal Empire	British East India Company	British victory
Battle of Agra (1857)	British East India Company	Mughal Empire	British victory
Siege of Delhi (1857)	Mughal Empire	British East India Company	British victory

== See also ==
- List of wars involving the Mughal Empire
- List of battles of Rajasthan
