= Siege of Ponda (disambiguation) =

Siege of Ponda may refer to:

- Siege of Ponda (1666), Shivaji's attempt to capture the fort from Bijapur Sultanate
- Siege of Ponda (1675), Shivaji's successful attempt to capture the fort from Bijapur Sultanate
