= Siege of Ponda (1666) =

1666 conflict in Deccan

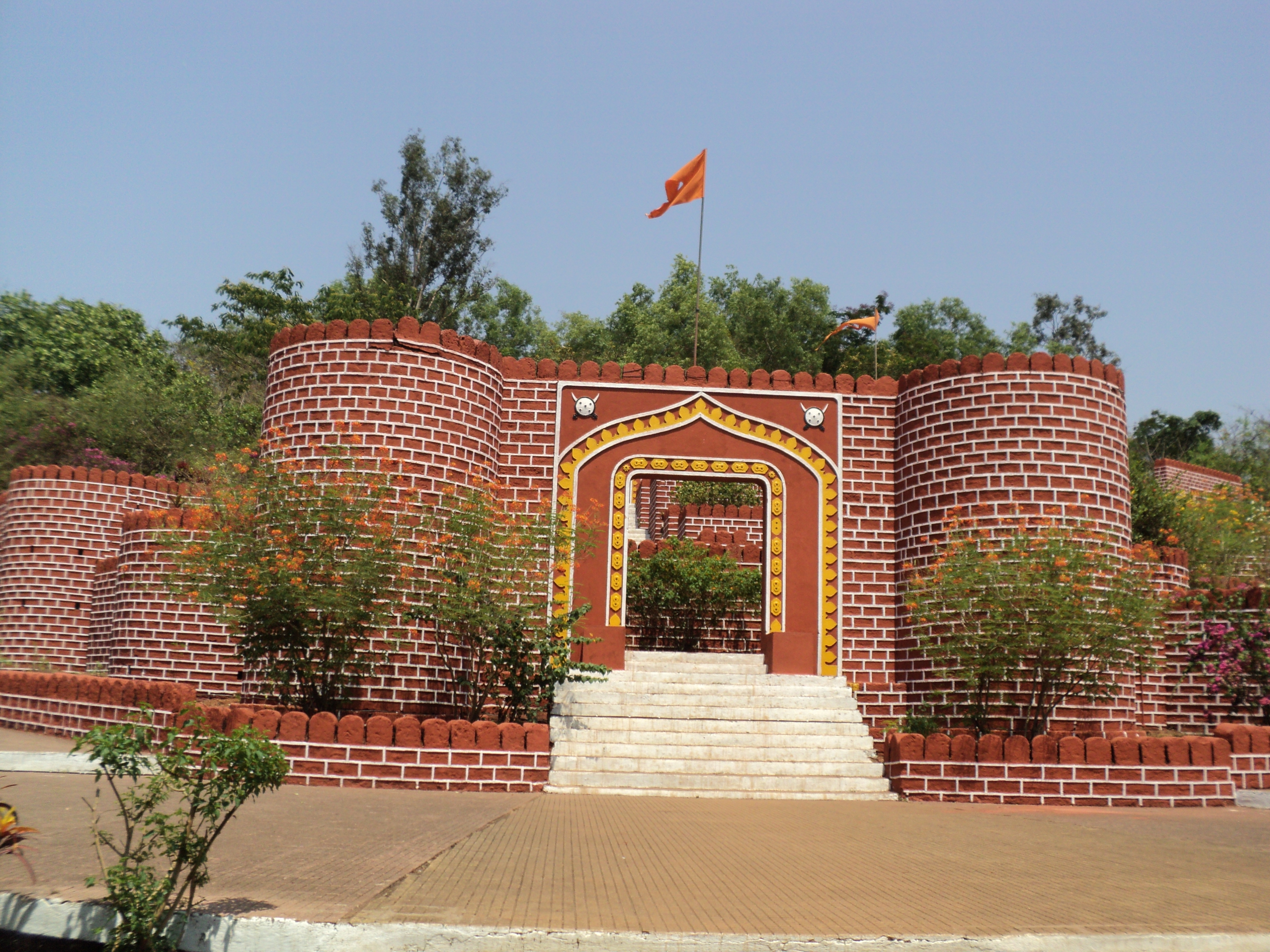
- Ponda Fort in 2010
Date	January 1666 A.D.
Location	Ponda, Goa 15°24′10″N 74°00′28″E
Result	Bijapur victory

Belligerents
Maratha Empire (Note: Mughal vassal at that time)	Bijapur Sultanate; Supported by Portuguese Goa

Commanders and leaders
Shivaji (Note: Mughal general at that time)	Muhammad Khan

Strength
2,000	unknown

Casualties and losses
500 killed	unknown
- Siege of Ponda (1666) Ponda (1666) (India)

The Siege of Phonda was a military conflict between the Bijapur Sultanate and the Marathas over the strategic fort of Phonda (Ponda), located at the borders of Goa in the year 1666, led by Shivaji, the first Maratha ruler. This was one of two sieges held in this location, with a second siege in 1675.

== Prelude ==
The Battle of Purandar concluded with the signing of the Treaty of Purandar on 11 June 1665. Shivaji relinquished control of 23 of his forts to the Mughals, and subsequently acknowledged Mughal suzerainty. Shivaji, then a Mughal commander was tasked to capture the fort of Panhala and Phonda from the Bijapur Sultanate.

Shivaji made the decision to initiate the siege of Ponda fort. The fort was being held by a Bijapuri commander named Muhammad Khan.

== The Siege ==
In January 1666, Shivaji dispatched 2,000 soldiers under a Muslim general who laid siege on the Fort of Ponda under his command. The garrison of the fort resisted for next two months killing 500 Marathas. Meanwhile 5,000 cavalry and 1,000 infantry arrived under the command of Siddi Masud, Abdul Aziz and Rustam-i-Zaman to the Panhala region. The Bijapur army planned to attack Shivaji but failed to execute the assault, giving Shivaji the opportunity to flee.

Masud Siddi charged the retreating Marathas with 600 cavalry, killing 200 of them. While returning back he intercepted Shivaji's friendly letters to Rustam. The letters were immediately sent to Adil Shah who unwillingly, pardoned Rustam but threatened to dismiss him if he fails to lift the siege of Phonda. Rustam communicated to Muhammad Khan to spare no effort in defending the fort. The Portuguese Viceroy of Goa provided ammunition and other assistance to the commander, aligning with the Adil Shahis of Bijapur.

Muhammad Khan carved a plan to attack the Maratha army under Shivaji's general. Moving down in a town off from Phonda with a small force, Muhammad Khan informed Shivaji's general that he had come to visit his country. As Shivaji and Rustam were friends, the general did not suspect. The Muslim general began offering prayers on top of the hill. Muhammad Khan ambushed and defeated the unprepared Maratha army, routing their siege-camp and overcoming the returning forces after a fierce battle. Despite the protracted siege, Shivaji failed

Despite the protracted siege, Shivaji now failed to seize control of the fort and ultimately retreated to his territory at Raigarh Fort. The fort's commandant emerged triumphant in defending the fort and preventing it from falling under Shivaji's dominion.

== Aftermath ==
After an unsuccessful siege, Shivaji returned to Raigarh. Rustam also took five towns viz. Pondá, Kudal, Banda, Sanquelim and Bicholim from Shivaji. In May 1666, Shivaji was summoned by Aurangzeb to Agra (though some sources mention Delhi) along with his nine-year-old son Sambhaji.

== See also ==
- Battle of Purandar
- Siege of Ponda (1675)

== Bibliography ==
- Powell-Price, John Cadwgan (1955). A History of India. T. Nelson.
- Kamble, B. R. (1982). Studies in Shivaji and His Times. Shivaji University.
- Pagdi, Setumadhava Rao (1974). Chhatrapati Shivaji. Continental Prakashan.
- Ali, Shanti Sadiq (1996). The African Dispersal in the Deccan: From Medieval to Modern Times. Orient Longman. ISBN 978-81-250-0485-1.
- Ali, B. Sheikh (1986). Goa Wins Freedom: Reflections and Reminiscences. Goa University. ISBN 978-81-85571-00-3.
- Jr, Everett Jenkins (2015-05-07). The Muslim Diaspora (Volume 2, 1500-1799): A Comprehensive Chronology of the Spread of Islam in Asia, Africa, Europe and the Americas. McFarland. ISBN 978-1-4766-0889-1.
- Sarkar, Jadunath (1961) [1919]. Shivaji and His Times (6th ed.). Calcutta: M. C. Sarkar & Sons Pvt. Ltd.
- Mhamai, S. K. (1984). SAWANTS OF WADI Coastal Politics in 18th and 19th Centuries. New Delhi: Concept Publishing Company.
