= Bhanwari Kaur =

- Born: Brij region, Uttar Pradesh, India
- Died: 1669
- Known for: Struggle against the oppression by Mughal ruler Aurangzeb

Bhanwari Kaur (b. ? - d.1669) was a woman from Brij region in Uttar Pradesh, India who struggled against the oppression by Mugal ruler Aurangzeb in 1669. She was the sister of Gokula Singh, a Jat chieftain of Tilpat.
