= Diler Khan =

Mughal general (died 1683)

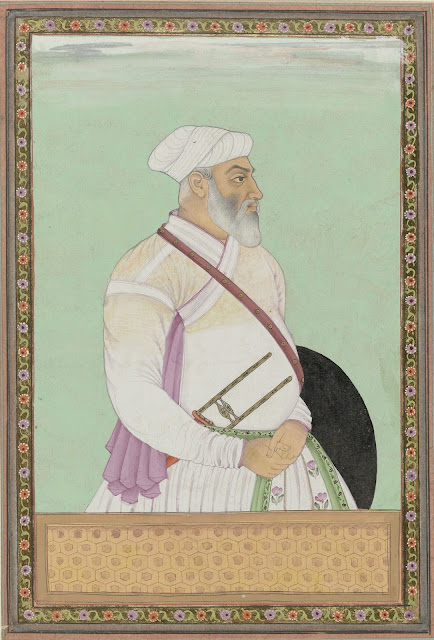
- Portrait of Diler Khan Daudzai. c.1686

Mughal subahdar of Awadh Mughal subahdar of Deccan Mughal Administrator of Multan
- Monarch: Aurangzeb

Personal details
- Born: Peshawar, Kabul Subah, Mughal Empire; Modern-day (Khyber Pakhtunkhwa, Pakistan)
- Died: c. 1683 Hardoi, Awadh Subah, Mughal Empire (modern-day Uttar Pradesh, India)
- Parent: Nawab Darya Khan Daudzai
- Occupation: Subahdar, sipahsalar

Military service
- Allegiance: Mughal Empire
- Branch/service: Mughal Army
- Years of service: 1660s-1683
- Rank: Mansabdar
- Battles/wars: Mughal-Maratha Wars; Battle of Bhupalgarh; Battle of Purandar; Battle of Salher

Diler Khan Daudzai was a Mughal general who served under Aurangzeb and was the governor of Awadh. He is known for engaging in battle and killing Murarbaji, the military general of Shivaji and the in-charge of Purandar Forts. His brother's name was Nawab Bahadur Khan. Diler Khan and Bahadur Khan together established the famous district Shahjahanpur located in Uttar Pradesh. He was also responsible for the Mughal victory over Shivaji in the Battle of Bhupalgarh.

== Early life ==
He was born near Peshawar, and was son of Nawab Darya Khan Rohilla, an Afghan who traced his descent to the Pashtun Daudzai tribe, and a mansabdar who served under the Indian Muslim Mir Bakhshi, Shaikh Farid Bukhari in 1603.

== Campaign against Marathas ==
After previous attempts to overthrow Shivaji failed, Aurangzeb sent Jai Singh, his most senior general ("Mirza Raja"), along with Diler Khan to overthrow the Marathas and establish Mughal rule in the Deccan. Diler Khan insisted on capturing Purandar Fort. Jai Singh, who understood the challenge the campaign involved. He advised Diler Khan to move his army on Vajragarh. Purandar Fort was a short distance from Vajragarh. If Vajragarh was captured, the Mughal cannons could easily capture the Purandar Fort.

On 13 April 1665, Diler Khan was successful in capturing Vajragarh. The Mughal army under Diler Khan and Jai Singh celebrated the victory over Vajragarh with booming of guns. Diler Khan then turned his attention to Purandar.

On 16 May 1665, Diler Khan faced Murarbaji, the in-charge of Purandar Fort. Murarbaji fought valiantly but was killed by Diler Khan's arrow.

== Later life ==
He died in 1683 in Hardoi. He had two sons: Kamaluddin and Fath Mamur, and the latter was killed in a battle in Bijapur.
