= Pisar =

Pisar is a surname. Notable people with the surname include:

- Jozef Pisár (born 1971), Slovak football striker
- Samuel Pisar (1929–2015), Polish-born American lawyer and author

== See also ==
- Pisal
