= Portuguese–Adil Shahi War (1555–1557) =

- Part of Vijayanagar-Portuguese Conflicts and Adil Shahi–Portuguese conflicts
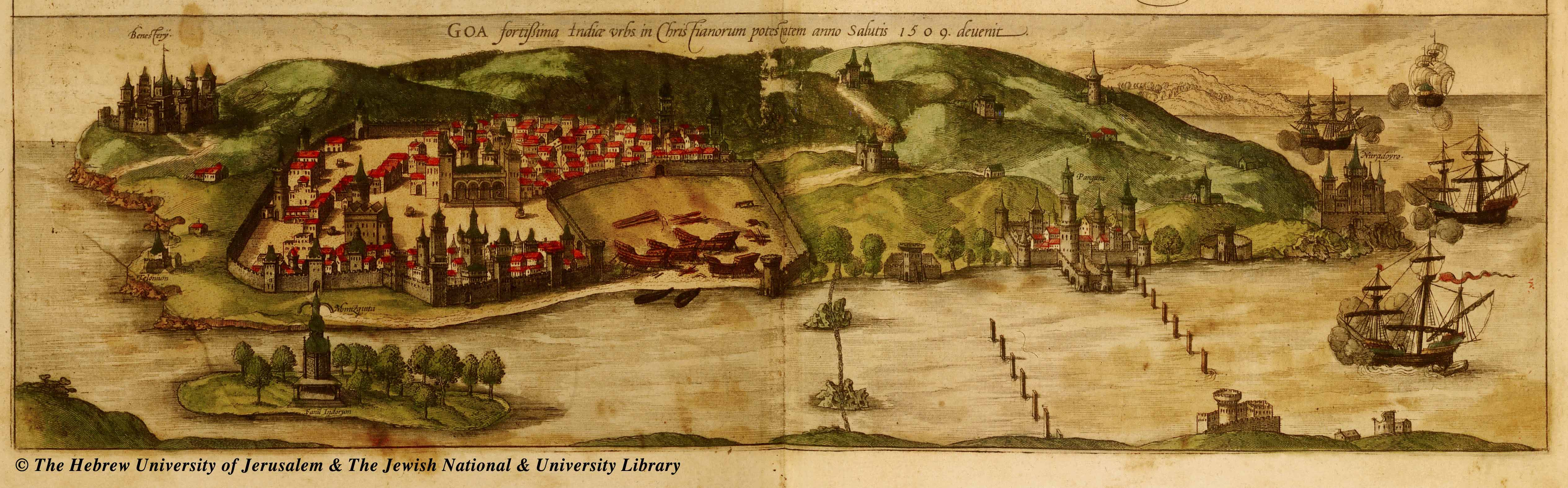
- Portuguese painting of Goa
Date	1555–1557
Location	Goa, Maharashtra, India
Result	Peace Treaty: End of Abdullah's rebellion
Territorial changes	Ponda Fort remained under Bijapur Sultanate control; Portuguese withdrawal from Konkan region

Belligerents
Bijapur Sultanate; Supported by: Vijayanagara Empire	Portuguese Empire

Commanders and leaders
Ibrahim Adil Shah I Shah Karim Aga; Nazir Malik; Nazir Khan; Vijayanagara Generals: Rama Raya; Venkatadri; Vitthala Raja; Sankanna Nayaka	(Portuguese Empire) Pedro Mascarenhas (Portuguese Empire) Francisco Barreto (Portuguese Empire) Gaspar de Mello (Portuguese Empire) Fernando Martins Freire (Portuguese Empire) Martim Affonso de Miranda (Portuguese Empire) Dom Fernando de Monroy (Portuguese Empire) Dom Antonio de Noronha (Portuguese Empire) Sebastiao de Sa (Portuguese Empire) Miguel Rodrigues Coutinho; Bijapur Claimant : Abdullah Adil Shah

Strength
Bijapur Army : 25,000 Infantry; 2000 Cavalry; Vijayanagara Army : 15,000 Infantry	3000 Infantry; 200 Cavalry; Unknown Number of Abdullah's Troops

The Portuguese–Adil Shahi War (1555–1557) was conflict between the Portuguese Empire and the Bijapur Sultanate under Ibrahim Adil Shah I. The conflict began when the Portuguese supported the rival claimant Abdullah Adil Shah and helped him capture the fortress of Ponda. In response, Ibrahim Adil Shah I sought assistance from Rama Raya of Vijayanagar and regained control of his kingdom. Fighting spread across Konkan, Ponda Fort, Salsette, Bardez and Dabhol with both sides carrying out military campaigns and raids. Although neither side achieved a decisive victory the war ended in 1557 when the Portuguese and Bijapur agreed to a peace treaty, bringing an end to the conflict.

== Background ==
In 1555 AD, the Portuguese Viceroy Pedro Mascarenhas supported Prince Abdullah Adil Shah's claim to the throne of Bijapur. At Goa, a grand ceremony was held in front of the Viceroy's palace where a richly decorated stage covered with silk and gold cloth was prepared. In the presence of Portuguese officials, Goans, and several Bijapuri nobles Pedro Mascarenhas personally crowned Abdullah as the Sultan of Bijapur. To show his gratitude, Abdullah immediately gave up all claims to the regions of Salsette and Bardez. Soon after the ceremony the Viceroy sent an army of about three thousand infantry and two hundred cavalry to capture the fortress of Ponda which remained under the control of the reigning Sultan of Bijapur.

== War ==
=== First Campaign ===
==== Siege of Ponda ====
The Portuguese Cavalry led by Gaspar de Mello, Captain of Goa marched first towards Ponda Fort while the main army followed under five experienced commanders. The fortress could not hold out for long and soon surrendered. After receiving the news, Viceroy Pedro Mascarenhas travelled to Ponda Fort with Prince Abdullah Adil Shah in a grand ceremonial procession. Abdullah formally took possession of the fort and immediately began preparations to recover the rest of the Bijapur Sultanate. Before leaving, he stationed a garrison of 600 men under Dom Antao de Noronha to defend the fort. Mascarenhas then returned to Goa where he died shortly afterwards. He was succeeded by Francisco Barreto who continued supporting Abdullah's cause. The success of the campaign pleased the King of Portugal who expressed his satisfaction in a letter sent from Lisbon to the City of Goa on 20 March 1557.

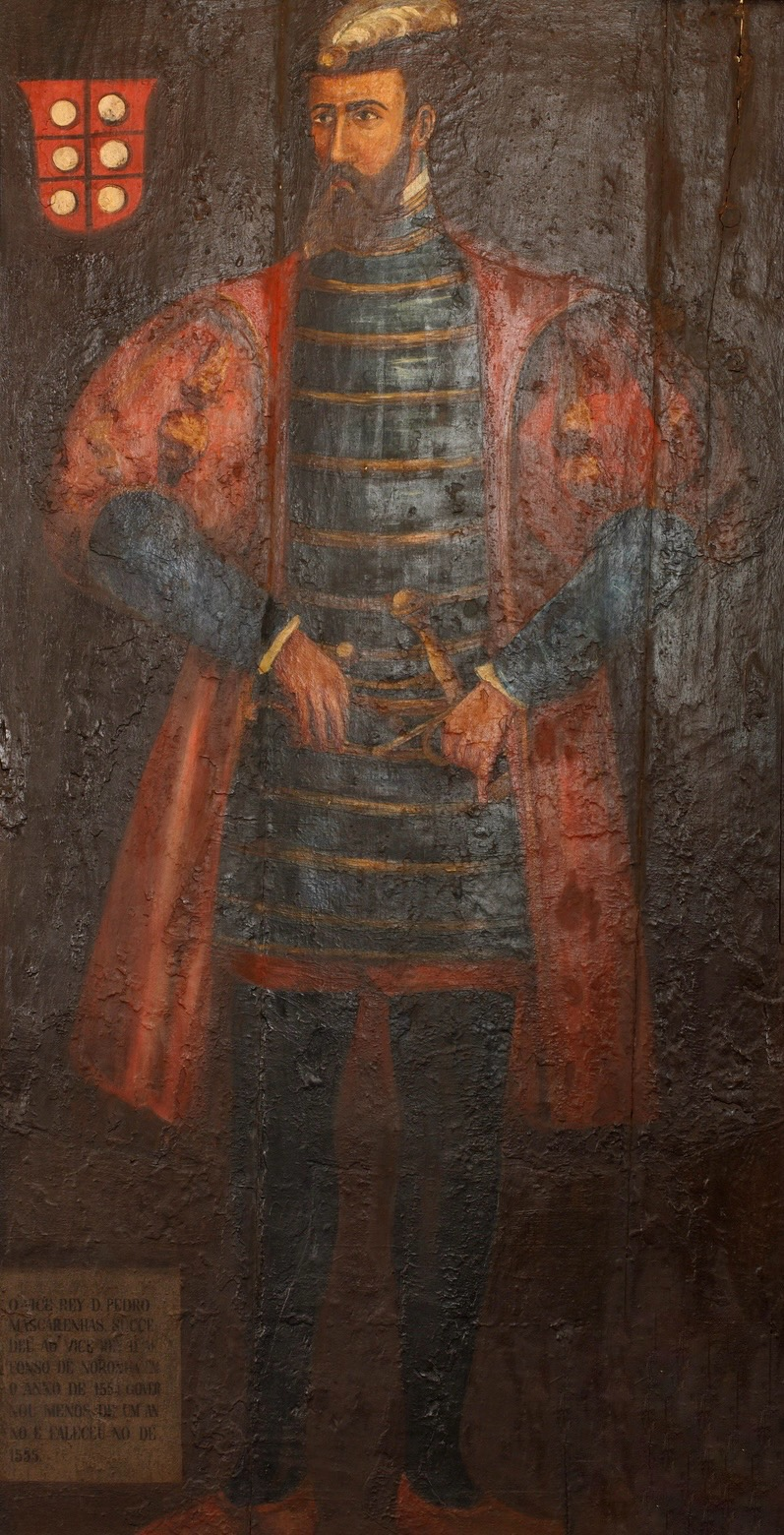
Pedro de Mascarenhas (Archaeological Survey of India, Goa)

After securing Ponda Fort the Portuguese divided their forces to strengthen their position. Dom Fernando de Monroy was left in charge of Ponda Fort while Dom Antonio de Noronha was sent to operate in the Konkan region. Miguel Rodrigues Coutinho was assigned to oversee the territories of Salsette and Bardez. Meanwhile, Governor Dom Francisco Barreto personally led an expedition against Dabhol.

=== Vijayanagara assistance ===
Angered by Portuguese support for Abdullah Adil Shah, Ibrahim Adil Shah I sought help from Rama Raya of Vijayanagar. With a force of 15,000 men sent by Rama Raya, Ibrahim Adil Shah I successfully overthrew Abdullah and took him prisoner. He then turned his attention to recovering territories occupied by the Portuguese. A Bijapur army of 7,000 men under Shah Karim Aga advanced into the Konkan region but was defeated by Dom Antonio de Noronha. Another force led by Nazir Mallik failed to dislodge Dom Fernando de Monroy from Ponda Fort. Meanwhile, Miguel Rodrigues Coutinho carried out raids across Salsette, Bardez and several coastal ports of Bijapur up to Dabhol capturing prisoners, seizing valuable booty, and taking a large number of ships.

==== Siege of Dabhol ====
Francisco Barreto led a campaign against Dabhol one of the important ports of the Bijapur Sultanate. Despite strong resistance from the defenders the Portuguese captured the town. After its fall, Dabhol was burned and many villages along the River Choul were also destroyed.

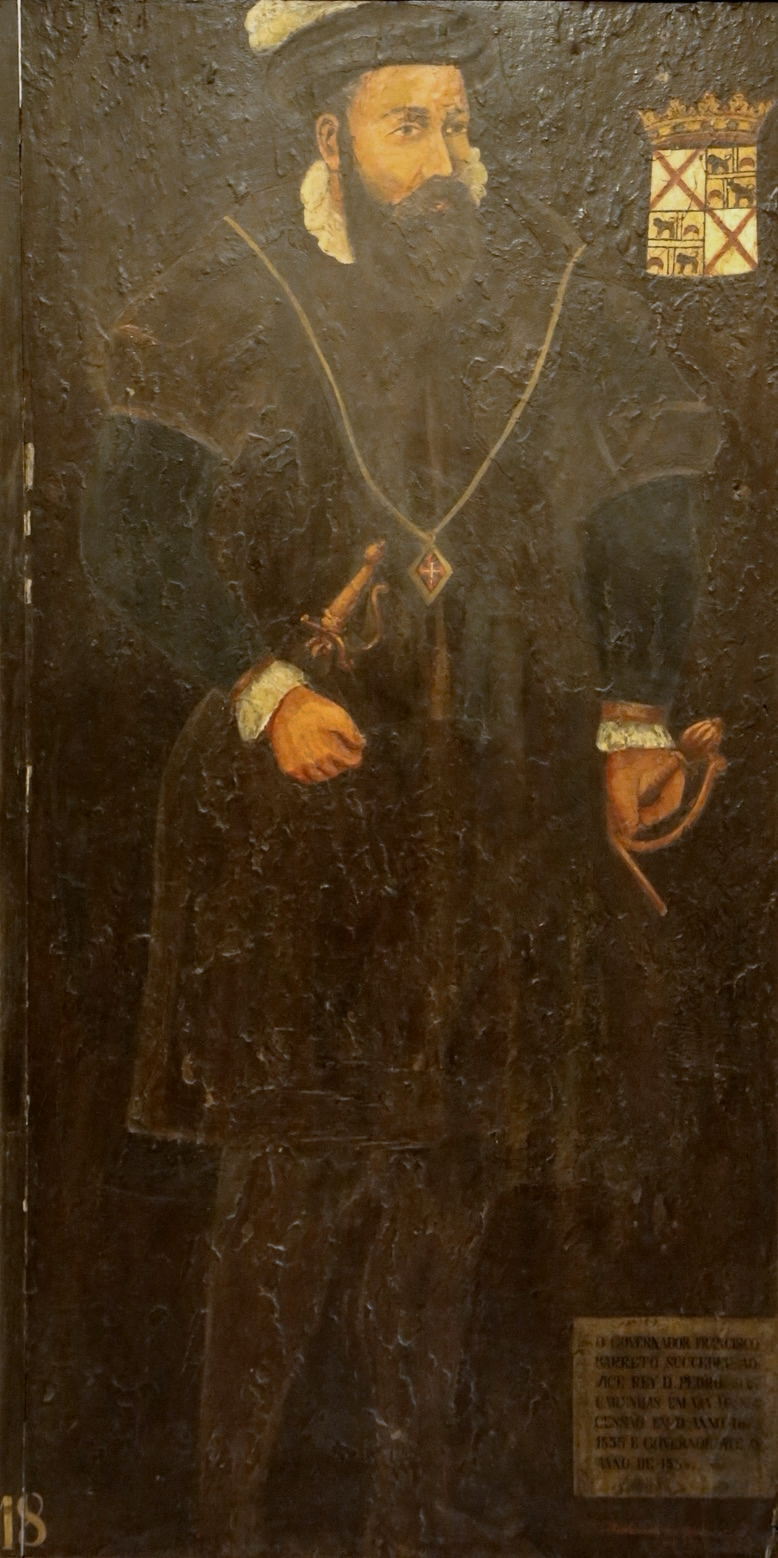
Francisco Barreto (Archaeological Survey of India, Goa)

=== Second Campaign ===
In 1557, Ibrahim Adil Shah I launched another campaign against the Portuguese sending an army of two thousand cavalry and eighteen thousand infantry under Nazir Khan. Around the same time, Rama Raya appears to have supported his ally Ibrahim by sending his brother Venkatadri and his cousin Vithala Raja against the mainland territories of Goa. Sankanna Nayaka of Keladi also seems to have joined the campaign. The allied forces attacked Rachol Ponda Fort, Salsette and Bardez. Although both sides claimed victories in different engagements the Portuguese commanders Dom Antonio de Noronha and Dom Fernando de Monroy were forced to withdraw from Konkan and Ponda Fort. However, the Portuguese successfully defended several other places.

== Aftermath ==
The Adil Shahi and the Portuguese realized that continuing the war would bring little benefit. With neither side willing to prolong the struggle negotiations were opened and a new treaty was agreed upon. This brought an end to the conflict and restored peaceful relations between the two powers.

== See also ==
- Luso-Adil Shahi War (1654–1655)
- Siege of Goa (1570–1571)
- Siege of Diu (1538)
