= Veer Murarbaji =

Upcoming Indian historical film

Veer Murarbaji: The Battle of Purandar
- First look poster
- Directed by: Ajay - Anirudh
- Produced by: Ajay Arekar; Anirudh Arekar; Bhausaheb Arekar
- Starring: Ankit Mohan; Sourabh Raaj Jain; Dipika Chikhlia; Arun Govil; Santosh Juvekar; Tanishaa; Prajakta Gaikwad; Harish Dudhade
- Production company: Almondss Creationss
- Distributed by: AA Films
- Country: India
- Languages: Marathi; Hindi

Veer Murarbaji: The Battle of Purandar is an unreleased Indian historical film directed by Ajay–Anirudh and produced by Almondss Creationss. Based on the life of Murarbaji Deshpande, the film stars Ankit Mohan in the title role, alongside Sourabh Raaj Jain, Tanishaa, Dipika Chikhlia, Arun Govil, Santosh Juvekar, Elakshi Gupta, Harish Dudhade, Prajakta Gaikwad. The film will simultaneously released in Marathi and Hindi languages.

The film was scheduled to release in theaters on 19 February 2026 but was later postponed.

== Storyline ==
The film is set in the year 1665, during which Jai Singh I and mughal general Diler Khan laid siege to Purandar Fort. Elite commander Veer Murarbaji Deshpande, the fort's Killedar, led a force of 700 elite Mavlas (Maratha soldiers) to confront Diler Khan's army.

== Cast ==
- Ankit Mohan as Murarbaji Deshpande
- Sourabh Raaj Jain as Chhatrapati Shivaji Maharaj
- Santosh Juvekar
- Tanishaa
- Elakshi Gupta as Soyarabai
- Harish Dudhade as Bahirji Naik
- Prajakta Gaikwad
- Sudesh Berry
- Dipika Chikhlia as Jijabai
- Arun Govil as Shahaji

== Production ==
On 6 June 2022, coinciding with the coronation ceremony of Shivaji Maharaj, Almondss Creationss and AA Films announced Veer Murarbaji, following the success of Fatteshikast (2019) and Pawankhind (2022). The film is produced by Ajay Arekar, Anirudh Arekar, and Bhausaheb Arekar. In May 2023, it was confirmed that Ankit Mohan would portray the role of Murarbaji. On 14 July 2023, Mohan revealed the motion poster of his character. The same month, Ajay Arekar confirmed Tanishaa's involvement in a key role in the film. In October 2023, Prajakta Gaikwad also confirmed her participation via a poster. By December 2023, it was reported that Dipika Chikhlia, would play the role of Jijabai, while Arun Govil would portray Shahaji Bhonsle, marking their debut in Marathi cinema. In August 2024, Sourabh Raaj Jain was signed on to play Shivaji. By November 2024, it was reported that Elakshi Gupta would reprise her role as Soyarabai, having previously portrayed the character in Tanhaji: The Unsung Warrior.

== Release ==
The film was originally slated for release on 17 February 2023, but its release was later postponed to May 2024, and then further moved to June 2024. It was set to be released on 14 February 2025, although this date was also postponed. In April 2025, the makers released a poster featuring Arun Govil and Dipika Chikhlia in their roles, announcing a June 2025 release date, but this was also pushed to 19 February 2026 coinciding Shiv Jayanti.
