= Battle of Bhupalgarh =

Battle in 1679

| Date | 2 April 1679 |
| Location | Bhupalgarh (Banur, Maharashtra) |
| Result | Mughal victory |

Belligerents
| Maratha Kingdom | Mughal Empire |

Commanders and leaders
| Shivaji | Diler Khan; Sambhaji |

Casualties and losses
| Heavy: 1,000 killed by Ikhlas Khan's forces; 700 survivors had one of their arms cut off; Other captured survivors sold into slavery | Heavy |

The Battle of Bhupalgarh (also spelled Bhupalgad) was fought between the Mughal Empire and Maratha Kingdom in 1679, near present day Khanapur, in a leadup to the Deccan wars. The Maratha were led by Shivaji, the first Maratha king. The battle resulted in the razing of the fort of Bhupalgarh and a decisive victory for the Mughals under general Diler Khan. Shivaji's son Sambhaji, who would later become the second king of the Maratha Empire, fought on the Mughal side after defecting from his father.

== Background ==
The reign of Mughal Emperor Aurangzeb (ruled 1658 to 1707) was marked by a campaign of rapid military expansion. This coincided with the establishment of the Maratha Kingdom by Shivaji, who came into conflict with the Mughals as early as 1657. Conflict between the two states continued sporadically.

Sambhaji was Shivaji's eldest son. Sambhaji's misbehaviour, including his irresponsibility and addiction to "sensual pleasures", was always a matter of great concern for Shivaji. In 1678, Sambhaji was confined to Panhala Fort by Shivaji after violating a Brahmin woman. Both Jadunath Sarkar and Pandit Shankar Joshi believe that Sambhaji's defection was ultimately motivated by a sense of dissent against his father, particularly against Shivaji's proposal to partition the kingdom between his sons. According to which, Sambhaji was to receive the newly acquired regions of Karnatak and coastal Gingee, while Raja Ram would inherit the heartlands of Maharashtra. Sarkar states that Sambhaji, aggrieved by this decision, decided to join Diler Khan, the Mughal governor of Deccan after receiving letters from him promising Mughal support to reclaim his rights.

On December 13, 1678, he escaped with his wife Yesu Bai and joined Diler Khan; following this, he was made a Mughal noble with the rank of seven thousand zat and was conferred the title of Raja by Aurangzeb. Sambhaji stayed with Diler Khan for a year, taking part in a campaign against the forces of both Shivaji and Bijapur. After his defection, Sambhaji stayed in Akluj. After some time, he marched to the Maratha fort of Bhupalgarh with Diler Khan. The fort was under the command of Firangoji Narsala. Before the battle began, Sambhaji reportedly sent a letter to Narsala, ordering him to surrender the fort to the Mughals. This demand went unanswered.

== Battle ==
The battle began with the Mughal artillery battering the fort's walls and towers. The next day, they launched an assault and fought until noon, ultimately capturing the fort with heavy casualties on both sides. Shivaji's 16,000-strong cavalry reinforcements arrived late, but were intercepted 12 miles from the fort by Ikhlas Khan's 1,500 cavalry. Ikhlas Khan's forces were surrounded but managed to hold them off until the reinforcements from Diler Khan arrived while also killing a thousand of Maratha soldiers. The Maratha army then fled the battlefield.

== Aftermath ==
Diler Khan seized large quantities of grain. He also captured people and sold them into slavery. He let go of seven hundred occupants after cutting off one of their arms. He later razed the fort to the ground. Pandit Shankar Joshi states:

For his desertion to the Mughals and his attack on the Bhupalgad and its defenders, Sambhaji would always stand in history as a condemnable person. Those actions of Sambhaji prove that he was a person of irrational character

A month later, Sambhaji went on to lay siege to Panhala with the support of Mughal army. With the death of Shivaji in 1680, and the ascension of Sambhaji to the throne, the Mughal–Maratha conflict would intensify into the Deccan wars, which saw Sambahji return to being an enemy of the Mughals.
