= Gokula Jat =

Indian rebel leader of Tilpat (died 1670)

Veer Gokula Jat
- Born: Gokul Dev; Tilpat, Mughal Empire (present-day Tilpat, Haryana, India)
- Died: 1 January 1670; Agra Subah, Mughal Empire (present-day Uttar Pradesh)
- Cause of death: Dismemberment
- Military career
- Known for: Leading the Jat uprising of 1669 against the Mughals

Gokula Jat (died 1 January 1670), also known as Gokul Dev, was a zamindar and chieftain who led a rebellion against the Mughal Empire during the reign of emperor Aurangzeb in the late 17th century. Gokula emerged as a symbol of resistance against Mughal oppression, particularly their discriminatory religious and economic policies. His leadership in the uprising of 1669 marked one of the earliest organised revolts against Mughal rule in India, influencing later rebellions and the rise of the Kingdom of Bharatpur.

In 1669, Gokula rallied approximately 20,000 Jats and other local farmers to resist oppressive Mughal taxation and religious policies. His forces achieved early successes, defeating and killing the Mughal Faujdar Abdul Nabi Khan at the Battle of Tilpat and destroying the Sadabad cantonment. However, the rebellion was crushed following the Tilpat's siege, where Gokula was captured after a four-day battle. Gokula was executed by dismemberment in Agra on 1 January 1670.

== Early life ==
Gokula (originally Ola or Gokul Dev) was born in a Hindu Jat family of Tilpat region (of Haga/Agre/Agha gotra) to Madu Haga and was the second of the family's four sons.

== Background ==
In the mid-17th century, the Mughal Empire under Aurangzeb faced growing discontent among its subjects, particularly in rural areas. The Jats, a predominantly agrarian community in the Mathura region (present-day Uttar Pradesh and Haryana), bore the brunt of heavy land revenue demands, often exceeding 50% of their produce. Aurangzeb’s reimposition of the jizya (a tax on non-Muslims) in 1669, coupled with forced Islamic conversions, destruction of Hindu temples and prohibition on Hindu festivals, deepened the sentiments among Hindu communities, mostly the Jats, who revered Mathura as a sacred center of lord Krishna worship. The spark for rebellion came in 1669 when mughal Abdul Nabi’s oppressive measures, including excessive tax collection and interference in local religious practices, pushed the Jats to the breaking point.

== Rebellion ==
In early 1669, Gokula, as the chieftain of Tilpat, emerged as the leader of a peasant uprising against Mughal oppression. The rebellion was sparked by Abdul Nabi’s excesses and the burdensome tax regime. Gokula mobilised approximately 20,000 Jat farmers, along with Gujjars and Ahirs. In May 1669, the rebels attacked Mughal outposts. An early victory came at the Battle of Sahora, where Gokula’s forces killed Abdul Nabi, while he attempted to capture the village. The rebels destroyed the Mughal cantonment at Sadabad, sacking regions around Mathura and disrupting Mughal control.This inspired the Hindus to fight against the Mughal rulers, who were there to destroy all Hindu rebels and this fight continued for five months.

== 1st Battle of Tilpat (1669) ==
The Battle of Tilpat was fought between Hindu Jats and the Mughal Empire in 1669. Under Aurangzeb's rule, Mughal Subahdars (governors) imposed heavy taxes (jizya) on the non-Muslim farmers of this region due to unhealthy financial conditions of the empire resulting from the continuous military expansion in the southern regions of the subcontinent. Due to the imposition of heavy taxation and restriction on Hindu religious practices, dissatisfaction and anger arose among the Jats and it took the form of rebellion against the Mughal Empire during Aurangzeb's reign. In an effort to suppress the rebellion, Aurangzeb sent his commander Hasan Ali Khan with a large army contingent of Mughal soldiers as a reinforcement to the Sadabad cantonment commanded by Abdul Nabi Khan, who would later be killed by the Jats. Gokula Jat, son of Tilpat Zamindar Madu Singh, led the rebellion of farmers along with his uncle Uday Singh Jat. The first confrontations of the rebellion continued for 4 days with the seizing of Tilpat and the farmers' counterattacks. Gokula's leadership in the Jat uprising of 1669 marked one of the earliest organised revolts against Mughal rule in India by Hindus.

== 2nd Battle of Tilpat ==
In 1669, Gokula Dev, with 20,000 Jat farmers, fought the Mughals, about 20 miles from Tilpat. Abdul Nabi Khan, a Mughal faujdar, attacked them. While Khan was initially successful, he was killed by the Jats on 12 May 1669 (21st Dhu al Hijja, 1079 A.H.). Gokula Dev and his followers then retreated to Tilpat, where Hasan Ali Khan, an Aurangzeb-appointed Mughal officer, followed and besieged them with reinforcements of 10,000 musketeers, 5,000 rocketmen, and 250 artillery pieces. Amanulla, the Faujdar of the environs of Agra, was also sent to reinforce Hasan Ali Khan. Gokula and his followers were captured alive and taken first to Delhi, and then to Agra, where Gokula was executed by Emperor Aurangzeb's decree.

== Death ==
Gokula was brought to Agra, following his capture by the Mughal forces at the Battle of Tilpat. He was executed by having his limbs cut off, one by one, on a public platform in Agra. Gokula's son and daughter were forcibly converted to Islam by the Mughal authorities under Aurangzeb. These conversions were not voluntary and were part of the broader context of Mughal policies toward non-Muslim rebels during Aurangzeb’s reign. In addition, Gokula's followers were imprisoned. Meanwhile, innocent people involved in the fighting were released after proper inquiries, and the elderly and children were handed over to a court eunuch for care.

== Legacy ==
A Rajasthani poet, Balveer Singh Karuna, in his book Samarveer Gokula wrote that:

Slowly the water of self-respect started to awaken,

I decided to rebel by refusing to pay taxes. You die only once in one birth And wait in the graves till the doomsday But we are immortal forever, the soul will not die

Only it will change its body and clothes again and again

— Balveer Singh Karuna, Samarveer Gokula,

== See also ==
- Rajaram of Sinsini
- Churaman
