= Raid of Ahmednagar (1657) =

Historical conflict

Maratha raid of Ahmednagar (1657)
- Part of Mughal–Maratha Wars
Date	Late March - 31 May 1657
Location	Ahmednagar district, Maharashtra, India
Result	Mughal victory

Belligerents
Marathas	Mughal Empire

Commanders and leaders
Shivaji; Minaji Bhonsla; Kashi	Nasiri Khan; Iraj Khan; Multafat Khan; Mirza khan

Strength
3,000 cavalry	3,000 cavalry

Casualties and losses
Unknown	Unknown

The Raid of Ahmednagar took place in 1657, when the Marathas led by Shivaji penetrated as far as Ahmednagar in hopes of asseting Bijapur Sultan, the raid, however, was repulsed.

== Background ==
After his independence, Shivaji maintained peace with the Mughals and the Adil Shahi dynasty. Upon the death of Mohammed Adil Shah, Sultan of Bijapur, the Mughal prince, Aurangzeb, began preparations for an Invasion of Bijapur and tried to lure the nobility of Adil-Shahi nobles to join Mughal ranks. In the meantime, Shivaji attempted to negotiate with Multafat Khan, the Mughal governor of Ahmednagar to join the Mughals if they recognized his newly conquered forts from the Adil Shahi Sultanate. However, The vague promises of favor and protection and the response made by Aurangzeb could not satisfy Shivaji. Meanwhile, in an attempt to diver the Mughal invasion, the Adil-Shah offered Shivaji better terms in exchange to raid Mughal territories in which Shivaji accepted.

== Raid ==
In late March 1657, Aurangzeb's forces were concentrated at the siege of Bidar, Two Maratha leaders, Minaji Bhonsla and Kashi, at the head of 3000 horses raided the Mughal villages of Chamargunda and raided other subdivisions, carrying destruction which Alarmed to the gates of Ahmednagar, meanwhile Shivaji was raiding Junnar in the north, during the night he scaled its walls and sacked the city after killing its guards, carrying 300,000 hun in cash, 200 horses, and much costly clothing and jewelry, The success of the Maratha raiders was due to the negligence of the local Mughal officers, upon hearing these raids, Aurangzeb took measures and reinforced Ahmadnagar district.

The Mughal officers Nasiri Khan and Iraj Khan were stationed in the district with a force of 3000 cavalry, and his movements were slow, On 30 April he entered the Pargana of Bir and four days later marched towards Ashti, thus showing a great delay in his march, meanwhile the Mughal General, Multafat Khan alongside Mirza Khan left Ahmednagar and relieved the village of Chamargunda, defeating Minaji on 28 April But the Marathas continued to rove about the parganah for some time longer. However, both generals followed up their victory and at last cleared the Chamargunda subdivision.

Meanwhile, Shivaji stayed in the Junnar subdivision for some time, until he heard of upcoming reinforcements, when the danger came close, he retreated to Ahmednagar and began plundering it, in 31 May, Nasiri Khan reached the scene, he surprised Shivaji's army and nearly encircled it. Many of the Marathas were slain, many wounded, and the rest put to flight. But they did not chase them, as the Mughal horses were exhausted, Aurangzeb then ordered his generals to counter-attack and raid Shivaji territory, however, The rains were heavy with the full violence of the monsoons, and the campaign was over, Shivji then retreated to his own kingdom and the Mughal officers fell back on their stations.
