= Battle of Tilpat (1669) =

Battle between Mughal Empire and the Jat

Date	12 May 1669
Location	Tilpat
Result	Mughal victory

Belligerents
Mughal forces	Jat chiefs of Tilpat

Commanders and leaders
Hasan Ali Khan	Gokula Jat (executed); Uday Singh Jat (executed)

Strength
Unknown	20,000

Casualties and losses
4,000 killed	5,000 killed

The Battle of Tilpat was fought between Jats and Mughal Subahdars on 12 May 1669. Gokula Jat burnt the city of Saidabad near Mathura which caused Mughal commander Abdul Nabi Khan to attack the village of Sūra. Abdul Nabi was wounded and killed. Aurangzeb sent Hassan Ali Khan to fight the rebels. Gokula Jat was captured alive during the battle and immediately sent to Delhi.

== Background ==
Mughal Emperor Aurangzeb enforced the jizya tax on non-Muslims despite opposition, reportedly pleased when Hindus, unable to pay, converted to Islam. In April 1665, he set customs duties at 2.5% for Muslim merchants and 5% for Hindu merchants. In May 1667, the duty was removed for Muslims but kept at 5% for Hindus. Aurangzeb offered rewards, government posts, release from prison, and favorable property dispute rulings to encourage conversions to Islam. In 1671, he ordered the replacement of Hindu head-clerks and accountants with Muslims, though later allowed Hindus to hold half these positions. In 1668, Hindu religious fairs were banned, and in March 1695, Hindus except the Rajputs were prohibited from riding in palanquins, on elephants, or on fine horses, and from carrying weapons. These measures caused significant unrest. Discontented Hindus in regions like Rajasthan, Bundelkhand, Malwa, and Khandesh resisted temple destruction, demolished converted mosques, and halted calls to prayer in some areas. Jizya collectors were attacked and expelled in certain regions. In early 1669, the Jat peasantry of Mathura, led by Gokla of Tilpat. They killed the faujdar, ‘Abd-un-Nabi, sacked the pargana of Sadabad, and caused disorder in the neighboring Agra district.

== Battle ==
In 1669, the emperor Aurangzeb sent a strong army under Radandaz Khan to end a rebellion in the Mathura district and appointed officers such as Saf Shikan Khan and Hasan Ali Khan to control the area. Despite these efforts, the region remained chaotic throughout the year. In September, a peace offer was made to the rebel leader Gokula Jat, stating that if he returned all his stolen goods, he would be pardoned—but this plan failed. By November, the situation had worsened to the point where the emperor had to leave Delhi to address the crisis. On 4 December, Hasan Ali Khan attacked several rebel villages, including Rewarah, Chandar-kaha, and Sarkhud. The villagers fought hard until midday; when they could no longer hold out, many chose to kill their own women and then launched a desperate final attack on the Mughal soldiers. Although the Mughal side suffered significant losses, about 300 rebels were killed and 250 men and women were captured. During this campaign, the emperor also sent 200 horsemen to protect villagers' crops and ensure that his soldiers did not mistreat the local people or take any children.Hasan Ali Khan, accompanied by his lieutenant Shaikh Razi-ud-din from Bhagalpur defeated Gokula. Gokula's rebel force, estimated at 20,000 strong and mostly composed of Jats and determined peasants, encountered the imperial army about 20 miles from Tilpat. After a long and bloody fight, the rebels, despite their brave charge, were overwhelmed by the superior discipline and artillery of the Mughal forces and fled to Tilpat. The city was besieged for three days before it was finally taken by force. The battle was very costly: around 4,000 Mughal soldiers and 5,000 rebels were killed, and 7,000 people—including Gokula and his family—were captured. Gokula was brutally executed by having his limbs cut off one by one on a public platform in Agra; his family was forced to convert to Islam, and his followers were imprisoned. Meanwhile, innocent people caught up in the fighting were released after proper inquiries, and the elderly and children were handed over to a court eunuch for care.
