= Siege of Shivneri Fort =

Second Siege of Shivneri Fort (1678)
- Part of Mughal–Maratha Wars
Date	April 1678
Location	Shivneri Fort
Result	Mughal victory

Belligerents
Maratha Empire	Mughal Empire

Commanders and leaders
Shivaji	Abdul Aziz Khan; Yahya Khan

Strength
300 men	Unknown

Casualties and losses
Most were killed	Unknown

The Second Siege of Shivneri Fort was a military engagement between the Mughal Army and the Maratha Army in Shivneri Fort. The Mughals repulsed the Marathas who attempted to take the fort.

== Siege ==
A few days after the return of Shivaji to Panhala in March, Maratha troops attacked a place called Mungi-Pattan on the Godavari River, 30 miles south of Aurangabad. It was then, in the next month, that the Marathas attempted to attack Shivneri Fort and captured it. They stationed themselves in the village of Junnar at its foot and, at night, tried to scale the walls with a force of 300 men with nooses and rope ladders. However, the Mughal commander, Abdul Aziz Khan, an expert Qiladar, though he had sent his son and followers to reinforce the Mughal general Yahya Khan in the village, personally slew all the Maratha infantry with a few men who had entered the fort. On the next day, he chased the remaining Maratha troops who hid in the hills below the fort, capturing them but releasing them with gifts, sending a message to Shivaji saying:

So long as I am Qiladar, you will never take this fort.
