= Battle of Shivneri Fort =

Maratha siege of Shivneri

First siege of Shivneri Fort (1673)
- Part of Mughal–Maratha Wars
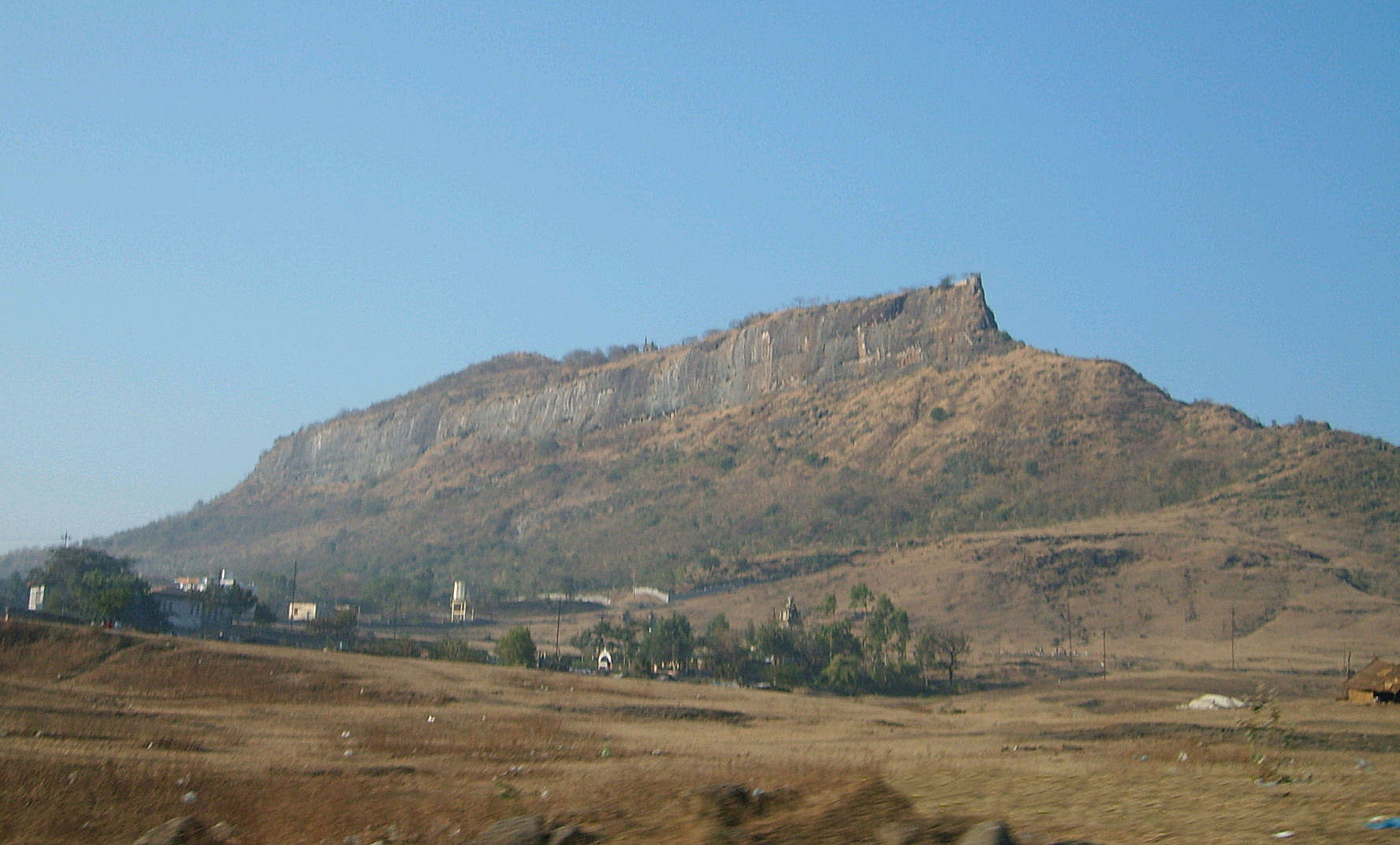
- Shivneri fort
Date	1673
Location	Shivneri Fort
Result	Mughal victory

Belligerents
Marathas	Mughal Empire

Commanders and leaders
Shivaji	Abdul Aziz Khan; Bahadur Khan

Strength
25,000	Unknown

Casualties and losses
Heavy	Unknown

The first siege of the Shivneri Fort was a military engagement between the Mughal Army and the Maratha Army near Shivneri Fort; the Mughals were victorious and the Marathas were defeated.

== Battle ==
Shivneri Fort, a mile west of Junnar, was of strategic importance as it guarded the Mughal frontier in the north of Pune district and blocked the shortest route by which he could raid the Deccan from North Konkan. Another important fact was that it was the birthplace of the Maratha king, Shivaji. The Mughal governor of Shivneri Fort was Abdul Aziz Khan, a Brahman convert to Islam and a loyal servant of Aurangzeb. Shivaji attempted to persuade him to surrender the fort by giving him a large amount of gold. Abdul Aziz pretended to comply with his terms and asked Shivaji for 25,000 cavalry, but at the same time informed the Mughal general Bahadur Khan of the plot. The Maratha army fell into an ambush planned by the Mughals and retired with heavy losses.
