= Murarbaji =

Maratha general (died 1665)

Murarbaji Deshpande
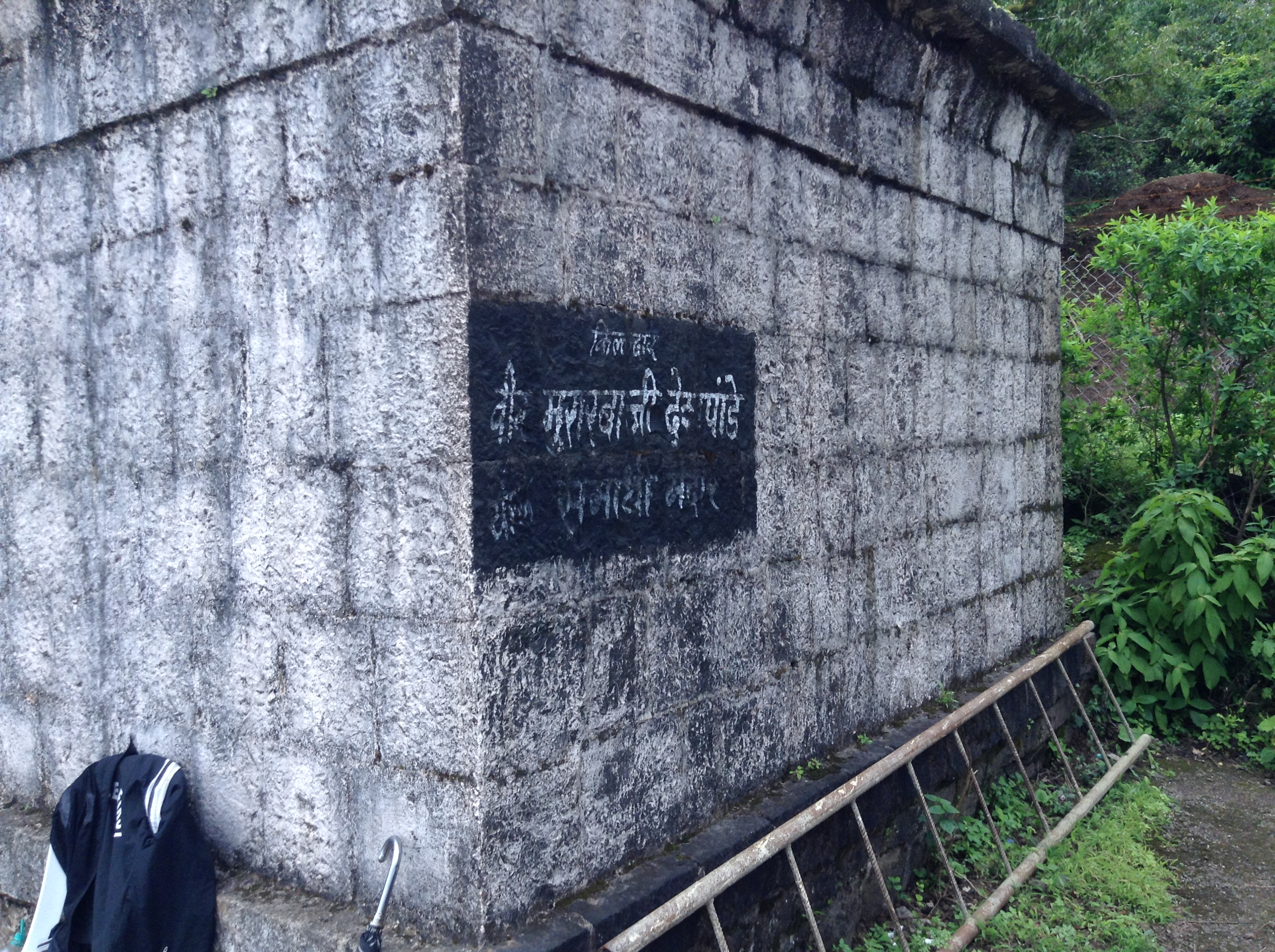
- Samadhi of Murar Baji Deshpande

General of Maratha Army
- Monarchs: Chandrarao Moré; Shivaji I

Personal details
- Died: 1665 Purandar
- Occupation: Kiladar of Purandar Fort

Military service
- Allegiance: Maratha Empire
- Service: Maratha Army
- Battles/wars: The Maratha rebellion: Battle of Jawali; Battle of Purandar †

Murarbaji Deshpande (died 1665) was an associate of Chhatrapati Shivaji Maharaj. He is best remembered for role in Battle of Purandar in which he was killed, and the Marathas lost the battle.

== Early life ==
Murarbaji Deshpande was born into a Chandraseniya Kayastha Prabhu (CKP) family and his native place was in Nadgaon (modern day Raigad district) as their family name "Nadkar" suggested, with roots in the Nachna town present in modern day Panna district, Madhya Pradesh. The Nadkar family's original clan name was Nachne, deriving from the town Nachna in Bundelkhand from where his ancestors migrated after the fall of Mandavgad. He commanded 700 mavle (maratha troop) to attack Diler Khan.

== Battle of Purandar ==
The battle for Purandar fort was a landmark battle of symbolic importance for both the Marathas and Mughals. It was essential for the Marathas to hold off the Mughals for as long as possible, thus demonstrating the difficulty of conquering the mountainous Maratha Empire. It was equally imperative for the Mughals to conquer Purandar as swiftly as possible to demonstrate the futility of resistance of the dominant Mughal empire.

Kille(Fort) Purandar

In the end, the battle ended with the Marathas suing for peace. In spite of crumbling defenses, Murarbaji and his troops sustained a dogged defense. Murarbaji was later killed in the battle.

The battle of Purandar, made the Marathas realize the difficulty, facing the overwhelming force led by Mirza Raja Jai Singh, but also revealed to the Mughals the tenacity of the Marathas. Thereafter Chatrapati Shivaji Maharaj sued for peace to Mirza Raja rather than risk the decimation of his forces and the ruin of his homeland. Aurangzeb asked Shivaji to come to Agra to sign the treaty of Purandar. As part of the settlement, Chatrapati Shivaji agreed to give up 23 of his forts and 400,000 hons to the Mughals.

== Popular culture ==
=== Films and television ===
- In the 2008-2009 Indian historical TV serial Raja Shivchhatrapati, he is portrayed by Shantanu Moghe.
- Veer Murarbaji is an upcoming Indian film based on Deshpande's life, produced by Almond Creations and AA Films.
