= Battle of Purandar =

1665 battle in India

- Part of Mughal conquests
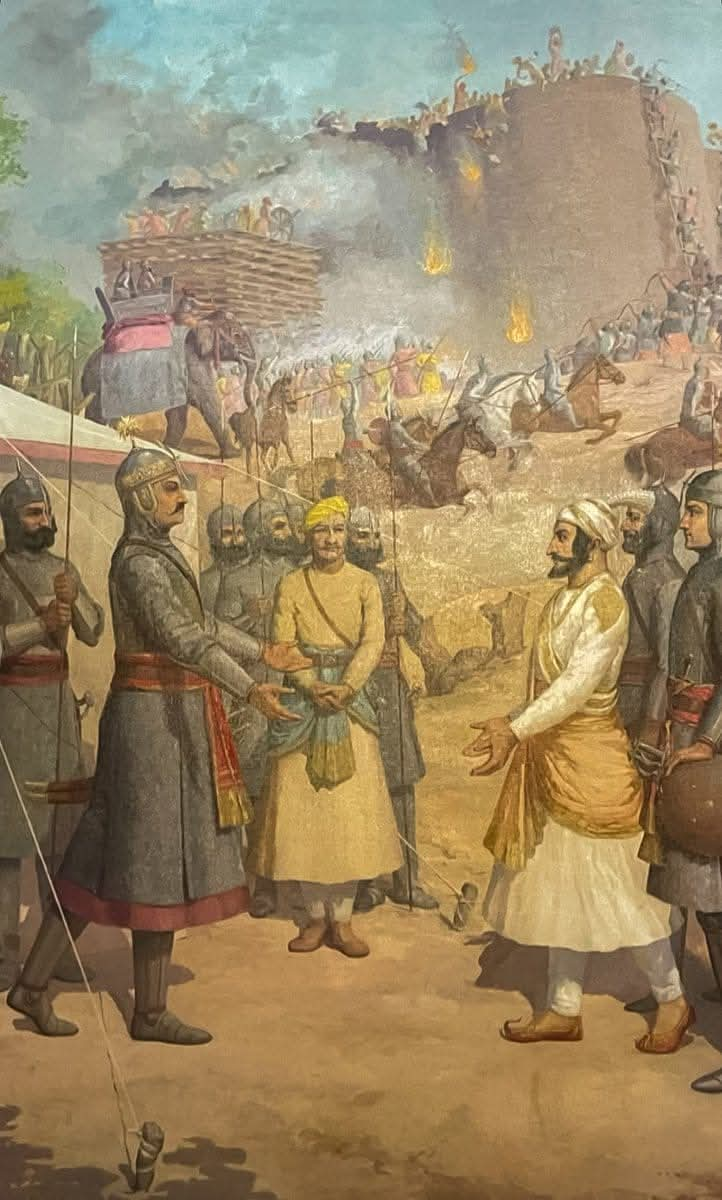
- The Surrender of Shivaji to Mirza Raja Jai Singh I at Purandar.
Date	31 March – 11 June 1665 (2 months, 1 week and 4 days)
Location	Purandar
Result	Mughal victory
Territorial changes	Mughals occupy 23 forts of Marathas

Belligerents
Maratha kingdom	Mughal Empire

Commanders and leaders
Shivaji; Murarbaji †	Jai Singh; Diler Khan

Strength
Unknown	12,000

The Battle of Purandar was fought between the Mughal Empire and the Marathas in 1665.

== Background ==
The Mughal Emperor, Aurangzeb, appointed Jai Singh to lead a 12,000-man army against Maratha king Shivaji. Shaista Khan and Muazzam were both replaced by Jai Singh after their failure against Shivaji in previous campaigns. Jai Singh was given full military power and made viceroy of Deccan by the Mughal Emperor.

== Siege ==
Jai Singh started his campaign by isolating Shivaji; he persuaded some Maratha nobles to join him and offered to reduce the tribute of the Bijapur Sultanate if they joined him. Jai Singh then besieged Purandar and beat off all Maratha attempts to relieve the fort. In 1665, Shivaji sued for peace. Shivaji is noted to have said when receiving Jai Singh:

"I have come as a guilty slave to seek forgiveness, and it is for you either to pardon or to kill me at your pleasure. I will make over my great forts, with the country of Konkan, to the Emperor's officers, and I will send you my son to enter the imperial service. As for myself, I hope that after the interval of one year, when I have paid my respects to the Emperor, I may be allowed, like other servants of the State who exercise authority in their own provinces, to live with my wife and family in a small fort or two. Whenever and wherever my services are required. I will on receiving orders, discharge my duty loyally."

== Aftermath ==
In the Treaty of Purandar, signed by Shivaji and Jai Singh on 11 June 1665, Shivaji agreed to give up 23 of his forts, keeping 12 for himself, and pay compensation of 400,000 gold hun to the Mughals. Shivaji agreed to become a vassal of the Mughal empire, and to send his son Sambhaji, along with 5,000 horsemen, to fight for the Mughals in the Deccan, as a mansabdar.

Sambhaji was taken as a political prisoner to ensure compliance with the treaty. Shivaji himself wished to be excused from attending the court but agreed to send his son Sambhaji. To this end, he wrote letters to Aurangzeb, requesting forgiveness for his actions and security for himself along with a robe of honour. He also requested Jai Singh to support him in getting his crimes pardoned by the emperor, stating "Now you are protector and a father to me, so I beg you to fulfil the ambition of your son." On September 15, 1665, Aurangzeb granted his request and sent him a letter and a firman along with a robe of honor. Shivaji responded with a letter thanking the emperor:

Shiva, the meanest of life-devoting slaves who wears the ring of servitude in his ear and the carpet of obedience on his shoulder—like an atom ... [acknowledges] the goodnews of his eternal happiness, namely favours from the Emperor ... This sinner and evil-doer did not deserve that his offences should be forgiven or his faults covered up. But the grace and favour of the Emperor have conferred on him a new life and unimaginable honour ...

In the treaty, Shivaji also agreed to help the Mughals against Bijapur, by sending some Maratha officers with Jai Singh against Bijapur. After the failed campaign against Bijapur, Jai Singh arranged a meeting between Aurangzeb and Shivaji, which proved to be a disaster, allowing Shivaji to escape and a renewal of the war between the Mughals and the Marathas.

== Sources ==
- Gordon, Stewart (1993), The Marathas 1600–1818, Cambridge University Press, ISBN 978-0-521-26883-7
- Haig, Wolseley; Burn, Richard (1960) [first published 1937], The Cambridge History of India, Volume IV: The Mughal Period, Cambridge University Press
- Sarkar, Jadunath (1920), History of Aurangzib: Based on Original Sources, Longmans, Green and Company
