= Pisal =

Pisal is surname mainly found amongst the Marathas.

== Origin ==
Pisal clans, like other Maratha clans, Pisals claim traces their Descendancy Back to the Suryavanshi Chalukyas. Popular people with this surname include Madanrao Pisal, former minister in Maharashtra.

== History ==
Pisal were Deshmukhs of two hundred villages of Wai (Satara District) under the Sultanate of Deccan. Later when Shivaji created the Maratha Empire, they joined him as bargir and shiledar warriors. The Pisal deshmukh were powerful sardars of Chhatrapati Shivaji, Sambhaji, and Rajaram.

On 19 October 1689, Suryajirao Pisal was involved in the defeat of Marathas and Mughals arrested Maharani Yesubai and Prince Shahu, the wife and young son of Sambhaji, respectively.

Pisals also took an active part in building the Maratha Empire, including serving in the Third Battle of Panipat in the year of 1761. Chhatrapati Rajaram's Daughter was married to son of Suryaji Pisal.

== See also ==
- Maratha War of Independence
- Maratha clan system
