= Siege of Ponda (1675) =

17th century conflict in Deccan

Date	8 April – 6 May 1675
Location	Ponda
Result	Maratha victory
Territorial changes	Ponda Fort, Shiveshwar Karwar and parts of the Konkan annexed by Marathas

Belligerents
Maratha Kingdom	Bijapur Sultanate	Portuguese India

Commanders and leaders
Shivaji	Bahlol Khan; Ranmast Khan; Muhammad Khan	None

Strength
2,000 Cavalry; 7,000 Infantry	Unknown	None

The siege of Ponda took place during the summer of 1675 in the region around Ponda, Goa.

Ponda at that time, was under the Bijapur Sultanate for nearly two centuries, which was at odds with the neighboring Portuguese Empire in Goa and the newly emerging rebel force of the Marathas.

In his surprise attack on the west coast of India, the forces of the Maratha king Shivaji encircled the fortress of Ponda, held by Bijapur and stormed it in an all out open siege. According to legend, he commissioned 500 ladders for this mission made 500 golden bracelets for the first climbers. A Bijapuri commander Bahlol Khan (alias Abdul Karim) started with a relief force but could not advance further than Miraj as the Marathas had blocked the ghat route by felling trees. The fortress' commander, Muhammad Khan, was one of the few to survive the massacre of the garrison.

The capture of Ponda resulted in the Maratha kingdom capturing some of the western parts of the Konkan region. Shivaji also appointed an agent, Umaji Pundit in the court of Rani Chellama of Keladi (Bednur), on her own request. She was harassed by her commander Timanna.

== Siege ==
On 18 April 1675, Shivaji commenced the siege of Ponda Fort, which was under the command of Muhammad Khan, with a large invading force of 2,000 horsemen and 7,000 infantrymen.

Concerned about potential Portuguese interference, Shivaji tried to secure a pledge of neutrality from them to prevent a repeat of their aid to the fort's defenders during a previous siege in 1666, while also secretly planning a raid into Portuguese territory. However, Shivaji's attempt to maintain a Portuguese envoy within the fortress was foiled when his men intercepted and arrested some Goan merchants along with supplies destined for Ponda.

On 29 April 1675, the Marathas crossed the Zuari River into Portuguese territory and led a surprise raid of Chandor, killing a servant of the Catholic Church and later targeted Cuncolim - both were Goan villages in Salsette, where they looted the inhabitants and seized Church ornaments. The Portuguese State Council convened and decided to investigate whether Shivaji's incursion was intentional or accidental, while also apprehending his envoy. Meanwhile, Shivaji besieged Ponda Fort, where he had reportedly made significant preparations for the siege, including crafting ladders and shackles of gold. Despite facing resistance from Bahlul Khan's forces, Shivaji successfully captured the fort and detained its commander, Muhammad Khan.

== Aftermath ==
Additionally, Shivaji's forces laid siege to Shiveshwar Castle and razed Karwar under the command of one of his generals. By 16 May 1675, Ponda fort fell to Shivaji's forces, resulting in the acquisition of territories such as Antruj, Ashtaghar, Hemadbarse, Bali, Chandravadi, and Kakode, consolidating his authority over the Bijapur Konkan region. The fortress of Ponda was renovated, with the installation of an idol of Ganapati at its entrance. The last Bijapur fortress-keeper, Muhamad Khan, was replaced by Trimbak Pandit under Shivaji's administration.
