= Ponda Fort =

Restored medieval fort

- Forte de Pondá
- Part of Portuguese India
- Village of Farmagudi; Near Ponda in India
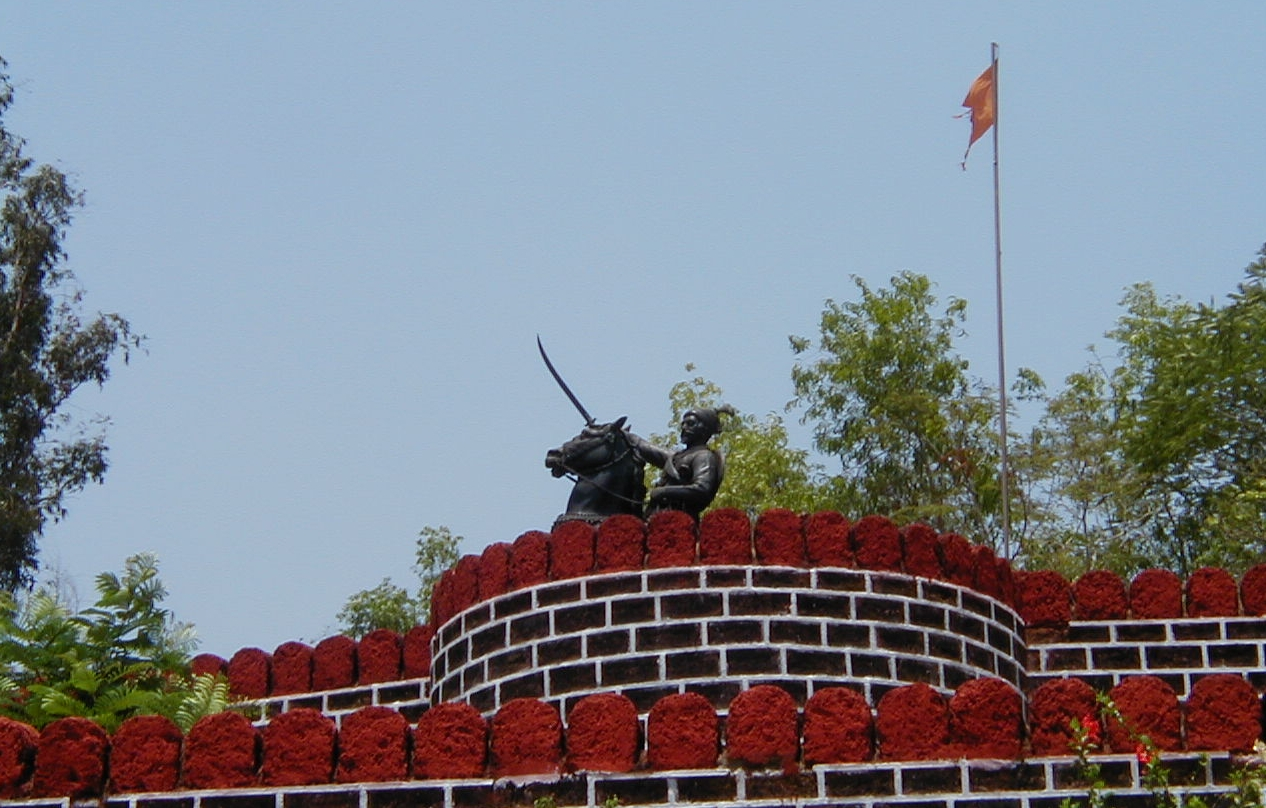
- Ponda Fort

Site information
- Type: Hill Fort
- Open to the public: Yes
- Condition: Renovated

Location
- Location of Ponda Fort Ponda Fort (India)
- Coordinates: 15°24′46″N 73°59′21″E

Site history
- Built: Before 1549
- Built by: Adil Shahi sultans of Bijapur
- Materials: Laterite stone and mud

Garrison information
- Current commander: none

The Ponda Fort, also known as the Chhatrapati Shivaji fort, stands on a hill at Farmagudi, near Ponda in the state of Goa, India. The present structure is maintained as a tourist site, with a statue of Shivaji.

== History ==
=== Adil Shahi period ===
The original fort, which local people call Kota, probably dates from the rule of the Adil Shahi sultans of Bijapur. The Portuguese under João de Castro destroyed it in 1549.

=== Shivaji and Sambhaji ===
Shivaji first laid siege to Ponda, then an Adil Shahi possession, in 1666 (see Siege of Ponda (1666)). The Portuguese secretly sent the garrison ammunition, and it held out. He laid siege to it again in 1675. The viceroy of Goa, officially neutral, sent help to the fort in secret, fearing that Goa would be Shivaji's next target, but Shivaji took Ponda in the middle of May 1675 and rebuilt the fort.

In 1683, while Sambhaji was besieging the Portuguese fort at Chaul, the viceroy of Goa attacked Ponda to draw him away. The small Maratha garrison held out until Sambhaji arrived with 600 men, and the viceroy was forced into a retreat that cost him heavily in men and equipment. Soon afterwards Sambhaji pulled down the old fort and built a new one nearby, which he named Mardangad.

=== 18th century ===
The Mughals took Ponda from Sambhaji in January 1689. From 1706 the area belonged to the kings of Sonda. Mardangad changed hands several times: the Maratha general Annaji Prabhu surrendered it to the Portuguese in June 1742, the viceroy, the Count of Alva, was killed in a failed attack on it in 1756, and in 1763 the Portuguese took it from its Maratha garrison of 700 men after a siege of about a fortnight. Ponda passed permanently to Portugal under treaties with Sonda in 1764 and 1771, and became part of the Novas Conquistas.

=== Present day ===
The fort at Farmagudi was renovated as a park after Goa became part of India. The statue of Shivaji was put up by Shashikala Kakodkar, a former chief minister of Goa; it is attributed to the sculptor Narayan Laxman Sonavadekar. The state government holds its annual Shivaji Jayanti celebrations near the fort, and the fort is repainted beforehand each year. Parts of its walls collapsed in 2015 and 2017. Redevelopment plans announced by state ministers in 2018 and 2021 had not been carried out by 2023.
