= Battle of Satara =

Battle in Western India (1700)

Coordinates: 7.6800°N 73.9800°E

- Part of Mughal–Maratha Wars
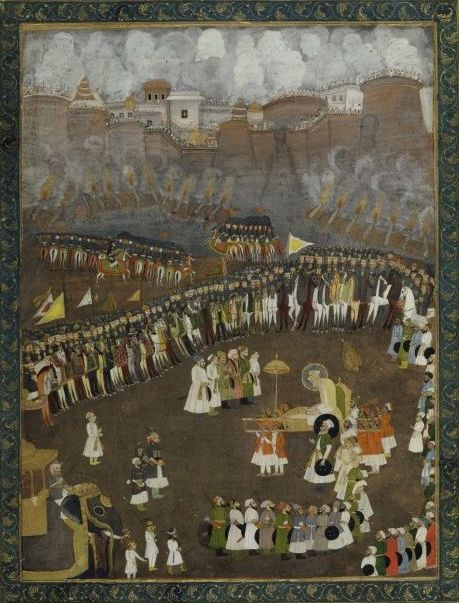
- Aurangzeb leads the Mughal Army during the battle.
Date	December 1699 – 21 April 1700
Location	Satara
Result	Mughal victory

Belligerents
Maratha Kingdom	Mughal Empire

Commanders and leaders
Dhanaji Jadhav	Aurangzeb

Strength
Unknown	10,000

The Battle of Satara was fought between the Mughal Empire and Maratha Kingdom between December 1699 and 21 April 1700. The battle started when the Mughal Emperor Aurangzeb personally marched towards Satara, accompanied by 10,000 Mughal soldiers.

He aimed to finally capture Satara, the center of the Maratha realm. The Mughal Emperor Aurangzeb then ordered for an attack on the fort of Satara. The Mughals destroyed major parts of the fortress and many of the other Mughal Forces surrounded and marched towards the further Maratha forts. Seeing this, the Maratha commander Dhanaji Jadhav surrendered the Satara fort on 21 April 1700, and rushed to protect the further Maratha Forts to which Mughal forces marched and surrounded. The Mughals captured the Satara fort and the battle was a huge loss for the Marathas.
