= Tilpat =

Tilpat Tilprastha
- Census town
- Location in Haryana, India Tilpat (India)
- Coordinates: 28°28′03″N 77°19′30″E
- Country: India
- State: Haryana
- District: Faridabad

Government
  - Type: BJP
  - Body: Faridabad Municipal Corporation

Population (2001)
  - Total: 6,377

Languages
  - Official: Hindi
- Time zone: UTC+5:30 (IST)
- Postal code: 121003
- Vehicle registration: HR
- Website: haryana.gov.in

Tilpat is a census town in Faridabad district in the Indian state of Haryana that comes under the Capital Region. It is dominated by Gaur Brahmins.

It also has the Tilpat 1 & 2 ranges of Indian Air Force on the banks of Yamuna. Tilpat is the main village of Tilpat 12 Khaap which dominantly led by Gaur Brahmin pradhaans/headmen by past. This traidition is also still present in this village. It was mentioned as Tilaprastha in Mahabharata.

== Demographics ==
As of 2001 India census, Tilpat had a population of 6377. Males constitute 55% of the population and females 45%. Tilpat has an average literacy rate of 65%, higher than the national average of 59.5%: male literacy is 75%, and female literacy is 53%. In Tilpat, 18% of the population is under 6 years of age.

== History ==
According to Hindu literature, Tilpat was one of the five villages demanded by the Pandavas for the sake of peace and to avert a disastrous war, Krishna proposed that if Hastinapura agreed to give the Pandavas only five villages named Indraprastha (Delhi), Svarnaprastha (Sonipat), Paniprastha (Panipat), Vyaghraprastha (Baghpat) and Tilaprastha (Tilpat), they would be satisfied and would make no more demands. Duryodhana vehemently refused, commenting that he would not part even with land as much as the point of a needle. This led to the Kurukshetra War, described in the Mahabharata.

Tilpat is listed in the Ain-i-Akbari as a pargana under Delhi sarkar, producing a revenue of 3,077,913 dams for the imperial treasury and supplying a force of 400 infantry and 40 cavalry. It had a brick fort at the time which was also mentioned and was held by Brahmins, Rajputs and Gurjars.

At the time of the Mughal emperor Aurangzeb in the year 1600, Tilpat was called Tilpat Garhi.

== Issues ==
In May 2018, Delhi High Court asked the government to ensure to protect the Tilpat 1 & 2 ranges of IAF on the banks of Yamuna river from the illegal sand mining.
