= Govind Singh (disambiguation) =

Govind Singh (born 1951) is an Indian politician.

Govind Singh may also refer to:

- Govind Narayan Singh (1920–2005), Indian politician
- Govind Singh (academic) (born 1984), academic and environmental activist
- Govind Kumar Singh, Indian fashion designer
- Govind Singh (colonel), Indian Army officer

== See also ==
- Guru Gobind Singh (1666–1708), tenth Sikh Guru
- Govind Singh Gurjar (1932–2009), Indian politician
- Govind Singh Dotasra (born 1964), Indian politician
