= Kanwar Zorawar Singh =

Kanwar Zorawar Singh Tanvar (khatipura Jaipur)
- Born: 14 February 1920; Jaipur, India
- Died: 24 December 1994 (aged 74)
- Military career
- Allegiance: India
- Branch: Indian Army
- Rank: Major-General
- Unit: Central India Horse
- Commands: Central India Horse
- Conflicts: World War II; Indo-Pakistani War of 1947
- Awards: MC

Major-General Kanwar Zorawar Singh MC (14 February 1920 – 24 December 1994) was a senior cavalry officer in the Indian Army.

== Early life ==
Singh was born in the Princely state of Jaipur on 14 February 1920, the son of Major-General Sir Bhairon Singh, an officer in the Jaipur State Forces. He attended the Prince of Wales Royal Indian Military College (RIMC) from August 1931 to 1938. Following his education at RIMC, he gained entrance to the Indian Military Academy. Upon graduation in 1941, he would receive the Sword of Honour for the best overall performance by a gentleman cadet. He was the younger brother of Colonel Thakur Harnath Singh and older brother Colonel Thakur Govind Singh, the latter of whom became the first Indian Commandant of the Governor-General’s Bodyguard (later the President’s Bodyguard).

== Military career ==
After receiving his commission as a cavalry officer, Singh briefly joined the 16th Light Cavalry before being transferred to the Central India Horse. During the Italian Campaign, the Central India Horse was a reconnaissance unit for the 4th Indian Division. Singh was made second-in-command of B Squadron in this regiment. On 3 August 1944 Singh led a reconnaissance patrol consisting of his squadron and another towards Casale Vecchia, which is north-west of Arezzo. The objective was to determine the location of the German frontline and eliminate any Germans encountered. During the patrol, a German reconnaissance force was encountered. The result of this engagement left two enemy dead and three others taken prisoner. Singh was awarded the Military Cross for leadership during the operation. In October 1944 the Central India Horse was sent to Greece to stabilise the country following the withdrawal of German forces.

After the Second World War, the Central India Horse returned to India in February 1946. Singh was promoted to the rank of lieutenant colonel and became commandant to the Central India Horse. In 1948 Pakistani forces attempted seize control over the state of Jammu and Kashmir. Singh was tasked with recapturing the town of Rajauri. The 28-mile road from Naushera to Rajauri was heavily damaged with felled trees and boulders acting as roadblocks. These obstructions had been mined. The road had a significant elevation gain and sections of the road along cliffs had been intentionally narrowed by the enemy. An assessment of the operation deemed it to be both time and labour-intensive to enable the road to be usable for an advance to Rajauri. Despite the difficulty involved, Singh went ahead with the operation on 7 April 1948. He would advance along the Tawi River, which was parallel to his route when sections of the road became impassable. On the evening of 10 April his task force had reached Rajauri. The arrival of Indian tanks in Rajauri had surprised the Pakistani Army and without equivalent firepower, they were forced to withdraw. His successful leadership of the operation earned him the status of being one of independent India's first great tank commanders.

In 1948 Singh's tenure of command at the CIH ended, when he was selected to attend the Command and General Staff College at Fort Leavenworth, United States. He was appointed to the staff of the Defense Services Staff College at Wellington, where he served for three years until being appointed to command the Tactical Wing of the Armoured Corps Centre and School at Ahmednagar. Upon promotion to brigadier, Singh was India's military attaché to France.

== Later life ==
After retiring from the army at the age of 49, Singh was appointed Colonel-in-Chief of the Central India Horse.

== Honours and decorations ==

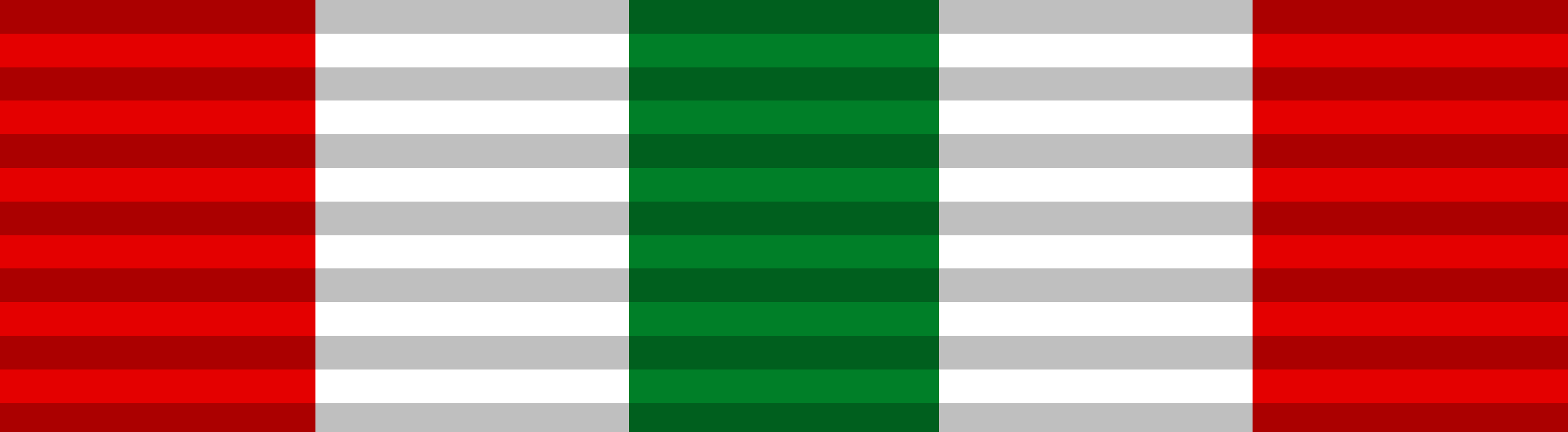

General Service Medal	Indian Independence Medal	Military Cross
1939–45 Star	Italy Star	War Medal 1939–1945

== Dates of rank ==
Insignia	Rank	Component	Date of rank
	Second Lieutenant	British Indian Army	3 April 1940
	Lieutenant	British Indian Army	1 May 1941
	Captain	British Indian Army	19 December 1941 (acting); 20 December 1941 (temporary); 20 September 1943 (war-substantive); 1 July 1946 (substantive)
	Major	British Indian Army	1942-1943 (temporary)
	Captain	Indian Army	15 August 1947 (Note: Upon independence in 1947, India became a Dominion within the British Commonwealth of Nations. As a result, the rank insignia of the British Army, incorporating the Tudor Crown and four-pointed Bath Star ("pip"), was retained, as George VI remained Commander-in-Chief of the Indian Armed Forces. After 26 January 1950, when India became a republic, the President of India became Commander-in-Chief, and the Ashoka Lion replaced the crown, with a five-pointed star being substituted for the "pip.")
	Captain	Indian Army	26 January 1950 (recommissioning and change in insignia)
	Major	Indian Army	6 July 1952
	Lieutenant-Colonel	Indian Army	6 July 1956
	Colonel	Indian Army	1 March 1958 (acting); 15 April 1960 (substantive)
	Brigadier	Indian Army	1 March 1958 (local); 6 July 1962 (substantive)
	Major General	Indian Army	3 June 1965

== See also ==
- Indian Army
