= Dyal Singh College, Delhi =

College of the University of Delhi, India

Dyal Singh College
- Other name: DSC
- Motto: "Gather Ye The Wisdom of East And West"
- Type: University Maintained Institution
- Established: 1959
- Founder: Dyal Singh Majithia
- Affiliations: University of Delhi
- Academic affiliations: University of Delhi
- Principal: Dr. V.k Paliwal
- Location: Lodi road, Pragati Vihar, New Delhi, Delhi, 110003, India
- Campus: South Campus
- Website: dsc.du.ac.in

Dyal Singh College is a co-educational institute of University of Delhi. It was established in 1959 in Delhi, India. It is a constituent college of Delhi University. It comes under South Campus of Delhi University and is a top ranked college of South Campus. It offers undergraduate as well as postgraduate courses in science, the humanities and commerce.

== Location ==
The college is centrally located at Lodhi Road in New Delhi near Lodhi Gardens, Jawaharlal Nehru Stadium, Safdarjung Tomb, Humayun's Tomb, India Habitat Centre, India International Centre and many other institutions of national and international significance. The college is surrounded by prominent and splendid neighbourhoods, markets and societies as Khan Market, Golf Links, Jor Bagh, Rabindra Nagar, Delhi Golf Club, Delhi Race Club and so on. It is often regarded as the most beautiful college of DU. It is next to Jawahar Lal Nehru Stadium Metro Station on the Violet Line of the Delhi Metro. The college has connectivity through buses of the Delhi Transport Corporation and Delhi Metro.

== History ==
The college's origin arose from the estate of Sardar Dyal Singh Majithia, founder of The Tribune and Punjab National Bank, who willed his estate in 1895 for the establishment of an educational trust for a secular college. Consequently, Dyal Singh College was established at Lahore in 1910. After the Partition of India, Dyal Singh College was established in Karnal and Delhi. It started functioning in the capital at Rouse Avenue as a constituent college of the University of Delhi w.e.f 5 August 1959 and at present location in Delhi since 16 October 1962, it was contracted by Sir Sobha Singh. It was taken over by the University of Delhi as a university maintained institution in 1978.

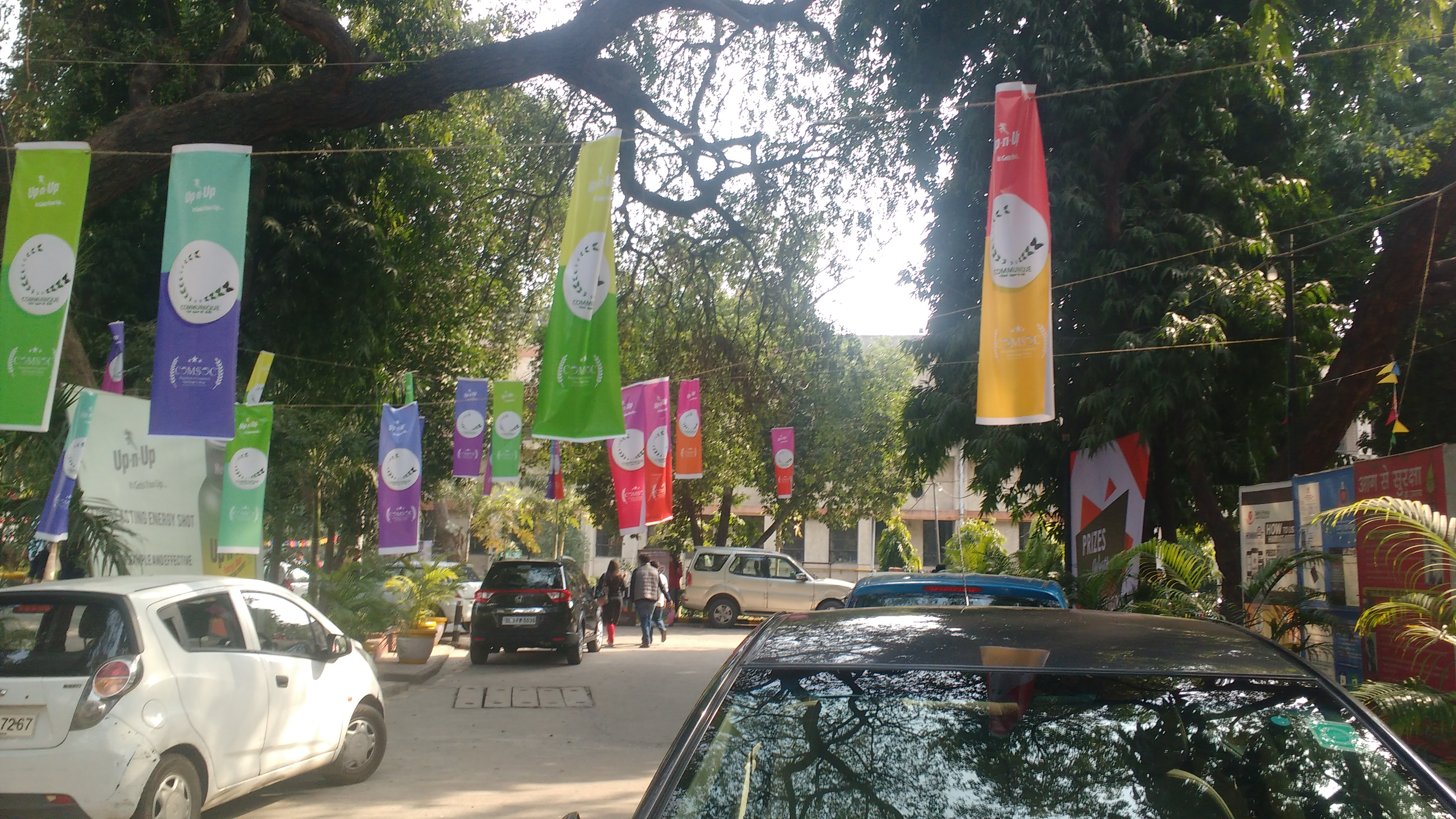
College During Festive Season

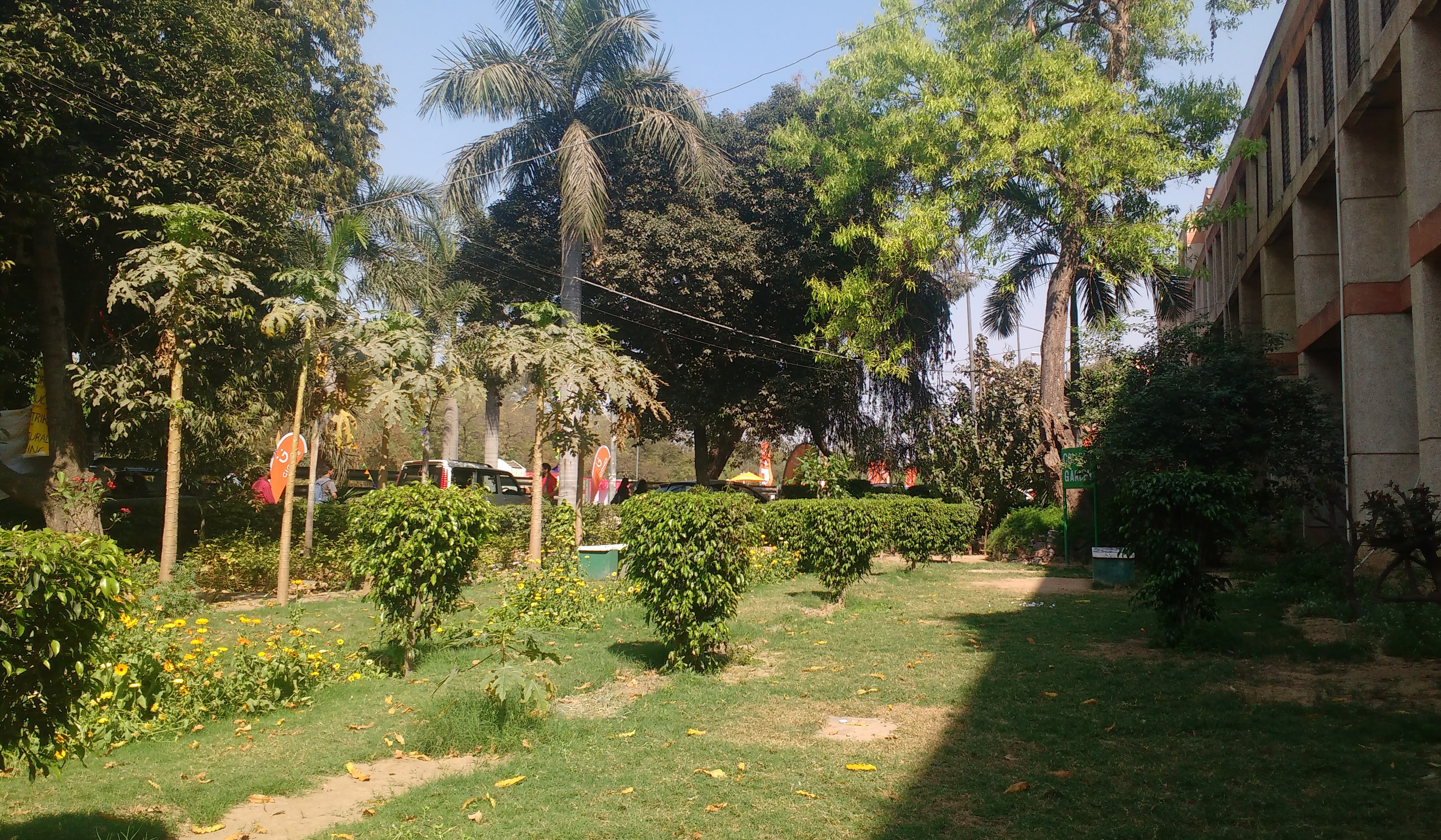
College Lawns

== Departments ==
The college currently has the following departments.

- Bengali
- Botany
- Chemistry
- Commerce
- Computer science
- Economics
- English
- Geography
- Hindi
- History
- Mathematics
- Philosophy
- Physical Education
- Physics
- Political science
- Punjabi
- Urdu
- Zoology

== Ranking ==
College rankings

General – India
- NIRF (Colleges) (2024): 34

Dyal Singh College is ranked 34th among colleges in India by the NIRF in 2024.

== Notable alumni ==
- Alka Lamba, Former member of Delhi legislative assembly
- Anil Chaudhary, former member of Delhi legislative assembly, president of Delhi Pradesh Congress Committee
- Dr. Govind Singh, associate professor at O.P. Jindal Global University, and Director, Delhi Greens.
- Pankaj Singh, Member of Uttar Pradesh legislative assembly
- Priyanka Kothari, Indian actress
- Rajvir Singh, former Indian wushu player
- Sandeep Kumar, Indian politician
- Sehban Azim, Indian actor
- Shruti Choudhry, former member of Parliament (Lok Sabha)
- Sheikh Noorul Hassan, Member of Manipur legislative assembly
- Neeraj Basoya, Member of Delhi legislative assembly

== See also ==
- Education in India
- Literacy in India
- List of institutions of higher education in Delhi
