= President Guard Regiment =

- প্রেসিডেন্ট গার্ড রেজিমেন্ট
- Insignia of the President Guard Regiment
- Active: 05 July 1975 – present
- Country: Bangladesh
- Type: Mechanized Infantry
- Role: Protection of the President and Prime minister VVIPs as per state protocol.
- Size: 3 Regiments
- Part of: Bangladesh Army
- Garrison/HQ: Dhaka Cantonment
- Anniversaries: 5 July

Commanders
- Current commander: Brigadier General Ghulam Ariqul Alam, afwc, psc, Infantry

Insignia
- Regimental flag

The President Guard Regiment (Bengali: প্রেসিডেন্ট গার্ড রেজিমেন্ট; abbreviated as PGR) is a cavalry regiment of Bangladesh Army under the Executive Office of the President of Bangladesh. It is located at Dhaka Cantonment, Bangabhaban and prime minister or chief adviser house. It provides military support for all security functions; including presidential travel, general medical support, emergency medical services, and hospitality services. The PGR is headed by the Military Secretary to the President and the Commander, President Guard Regiment. The regiment was created by President Sheikh Mujibur Rahman in 1975. It was originally designated as the Presidential Security Force. The PSF was restructured and upgraded to full regimental status by military ruler Hussain Muhammad Ershad in 1982 and the new title of President Guard Regiment was adopted.

== History ==
The "predecessor" of the regiment was the President's Bodyguard of Pakistan, which was itself descended from the colonial-era Governor General's Bodyguard. This role was discontinued in 1971 with Bangladeshi independence but the regiment was established in 1975 and restructured in 1982, and charged with ensuring the physical security of the President, visiting heads of state and high-ranking dignitaries.

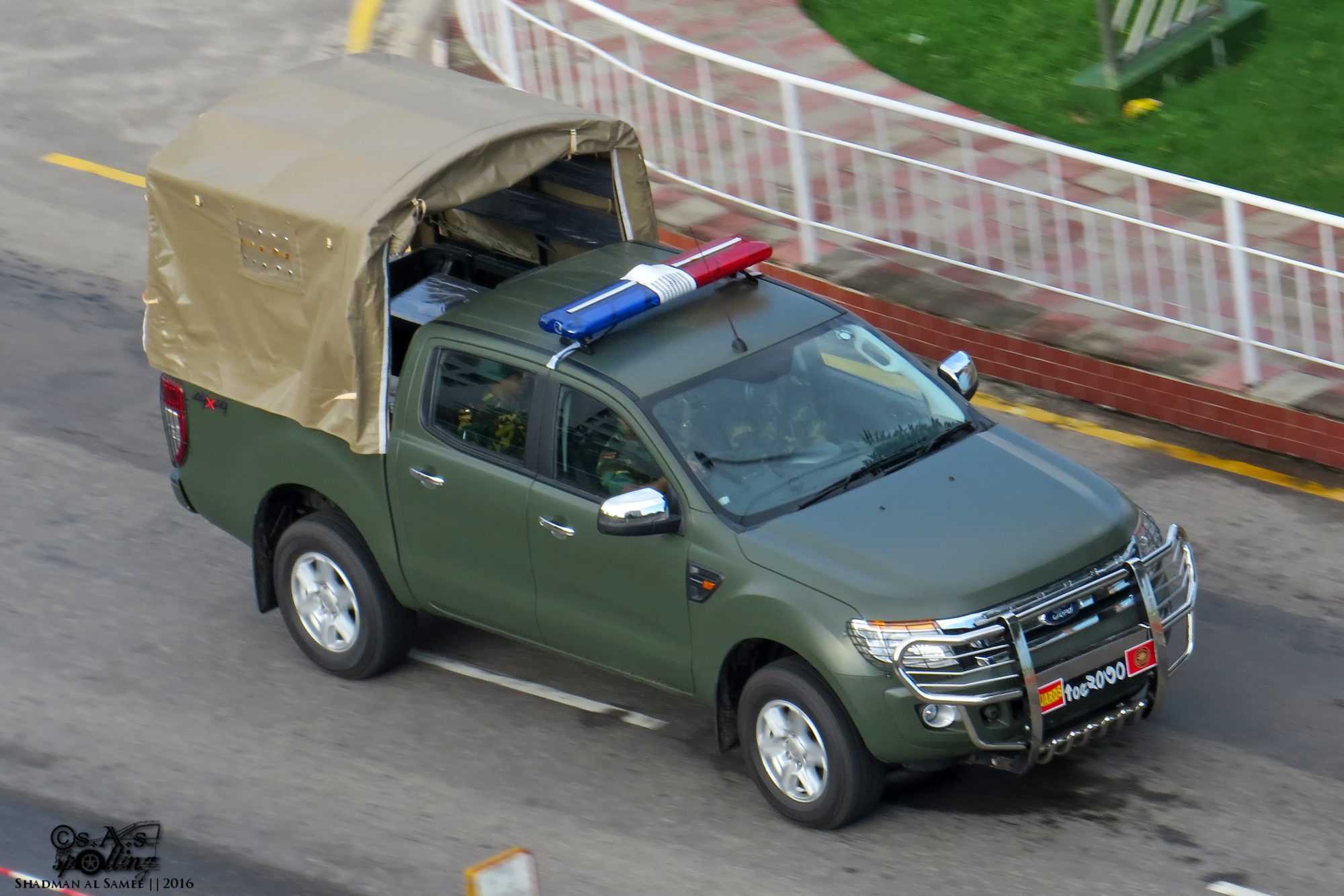
PGR Ford Ranger pickup

== Mission and function ==
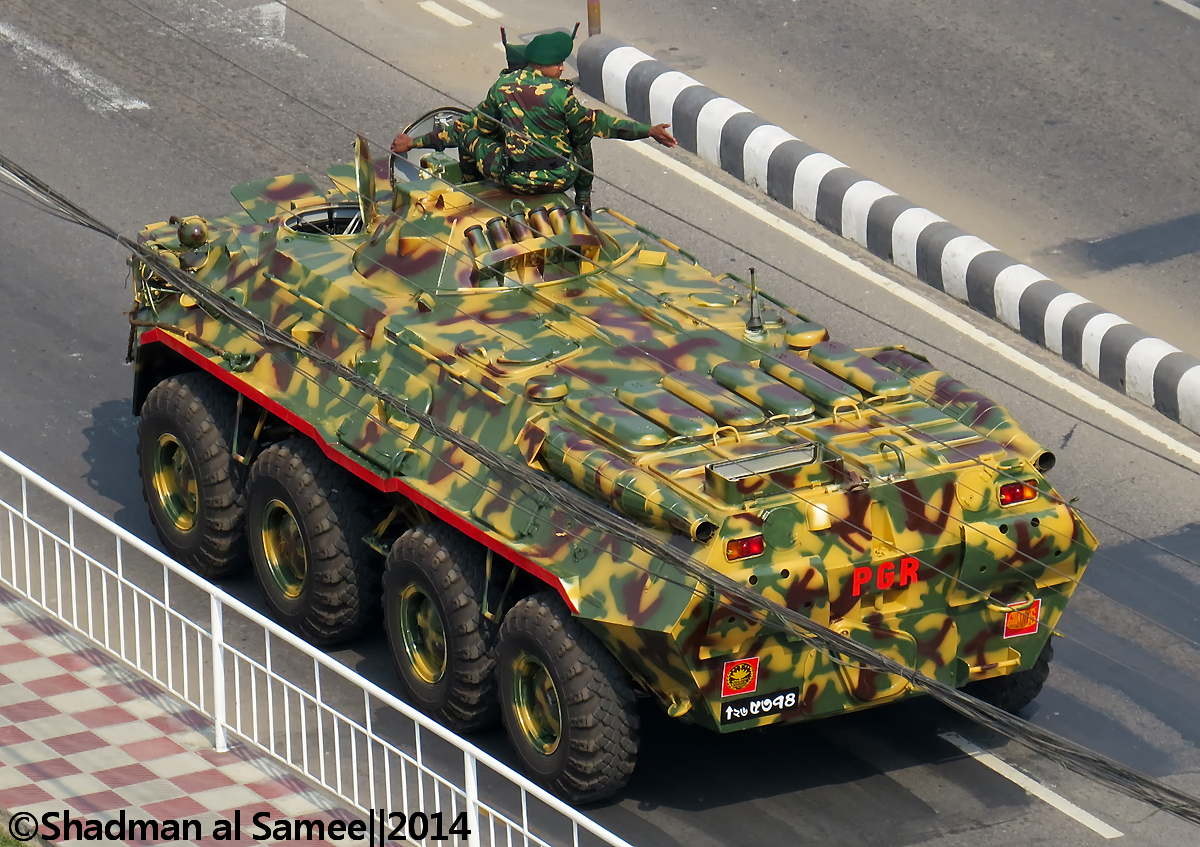
BTR-80 of President Guard Regiment

The force is charged with providing security for the President of Bangladesh, the Prime Minister of Bangladesh, their immediate family members and any other VVIPs designated as such by both enacted legislation and government decisions.

All presidential aides-de-camp are assigned under this office. Visiting spouses of foreign Heads of State, Heads of Government and dignitaries also receive their protection.

The commander of the President Guard Regiment is an army major general with the designation of Military Secretary to the President; the equivalent of the U.S. Director of the White House Military Office. The commander reports directly to the president.

The Commander is normally a Brigadier General with responsibility for the day-to-day administration of the regiment.

The regiment consists of eight platoons, each commanded by either a major or a captain. The regiment's uniform varies slightly from that of other units of the Bangladesh Army. Its members are authorised to carry firearms when in uniform, even during peacetime.

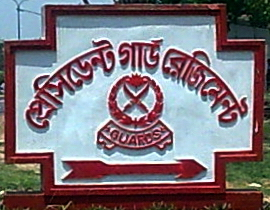
PGR HQ Road Sign

== See also ==
- Governor General's Bodyguard
- President's Bodyguard (India)
- President's Bodyguard (Pakistan)
- Household Cavalry (United Kingdom)
- President's Guard (Sri Lanka)
