= President's Bodyguard (Pakistan) =

Household cavalry regiment of the Pakistan Army

- Founded: 1773 (1947)
- Country: Pakistan
- Branch: Pakistan Army
- Type: Cavalry
- Role: Public duties Armoured regiment
- Size: 1 regiment (battalion)
- Part of: Pakistan Armoured Corps
- Garrison/HQ: Islamabad, Pakistan
- Patron: President of Pakistan
- Motto(s): Death before Surrender

Commanders
- Current commander: Lt. Col Ayaz Ahmed
- Notable commanders: Yaqoob Khan

The President's Bodyguard is an elite cavalry regiment of the Pakistan Army. The primary role of the regiment is to escort and protect the President of Pakistan. The regiment is based at the Aiwan-e-Sadr in Islamabad, Pakistan. It is equipped as a mounted unit, with horses for ceremonies at the presidential palace.

== History ==
The predecessor to the regiment was first formed in 1773 as the "Governor's Troop of Moghuls" and consisted of personnel drawn from across areas of India controlled by the British East India Company. The regiment underwent a number of name changes with the final one before independence being in 1946 as the Governor General's Bodyguard.

In 1947, the partition of India resulted in the creation of two independent countries, India and Pakistan. Muslim personnel from the regiment were transferred to the new Pakistan Army to form the Governor General's Bodyguard, Pakistan, with Yaqoob Khan as the first commandant with the rank of lieutenant colonel. The rest of the colonial Governor General's Bodyguard remained with the Indian Army and was renamed as the President's Bodyguard when India became a republic in 1950.

The regiment was subsequently renamed to its current name on 23 March 1956, when Pakistan became a republic and the Governor General, Iskander Ali Mirza, became the first President. In 1958, US Defense Secretary Neil H. McElroy became an honorary member of the regiment on October 24, just days before President Mirza was overthrown in the 1958 Pakistani coup d'état (27 October 1958).

The regiment has retained a link with the British monarchy. In 1961, the regiment performed various equestrian activities such as polo games and tent pegging during the state visit to Pakistan by the British queen, Elizabeth II. A more recent interaction was the involvement of the regiment in events related to the 2012 Diamond Jubilee of Elizabeth II.

== Uniform ==
A news article of 1965 mentions the members of the regiment as wearing the pugree (turban).

== Sports ==
The regiment has long had a connection with equestrianism and in particular with the sport of polo. In 1983, the Equestrian Federation of Pakistan was founded by the regiment and continued to be administered by it until December 2013, when responsibility was transferred to the Punjab Rangers.

Teams from the regiment have participated in a number of polo tournaments including:

- Winning the 1969 "Turkish President's Challenge Cup".
- Participating in the 2011 "Caanchi & Lugari Polo Cup".
- Winning the 2018 "Abrar Hussain Memorial Polo Cup".
- Hosting the 2021 "President’s Bodyguard Polo Cup".

== Alliances ==
- United Kingdom - Life Guards

== See also ==
- President Guard Regiment (Bangladesh)
- Governor General's Bodyguard
- President's Bodyguard (India)
- Household Cavalry (United Kingdom)
