= President's Bodyguard (India) =

Elite household cavalry regiment of the Indian Army

- Active: 1773 – present
- Country: Republic of India
- Allegiance: President of India
- Branch: Indian Army
- Type: Household cavalry
- Role: Ceremonial during peace; Armoured reconnaissance & parachute pathfinders during war.
- Size: 222 (4 officers, 20 JCOs & 198 soldiers)
- Part of: 50th Parachute Brigade
- Mottos: Bharat Mata Ki Jai (Victory to Mother India)
- March: Sare Jahan se Accha
- Equipment: BTR-80

Commanders
- Colonel of the regiment: Colonel Amit Berwal
- Ceremonial chief: President of India

Insignia
- Identification symbol: PBG

The President's Bodyguard (PBG) is an elite household cavalry regiment of the Indian Army. It is the senior-most regiment in the order of precedence of the units of the Indian Army. The primary role of the President's Bodyguard is to escort and protect the President of India. The regiment is based in the Rashtrapati Bhavan in New Delhi, India. It is equipped as a mounted unit, with horses for ceremonies at the presidential palace and BTR-80 vehicles for use in combat.

The personnel of the regiment are also trained as paratroopers and nominally are expected to lead in airborne assaults as pathfinders. The regiment was previously the Governor General's Bodyguard of the British Raj.

== History ==
President's Bodyguard during their routine exercise

The President's Bodyguard was previously the Governor General's Bodyguard of the Presidency armies and the British Indian Army. The Governor-General's Bodyguard was raised in September 1773 by Governor-General Warren Hastings from a handpicked 50 troopers of the Moghal Horse, itself raised in 1760 by local sirdars. In the same year, Maharaja Chait Singh of Benares provided another 50 troopers, raising the strength of the unit to 100. The first commander of the unit was Captain Sweeny Toone, an officer of the East India Company, who had Lieutenant Samuel Black as his subaltern.

External videos
- The President's Bodyguard, a 2018 documentary film by National Geographic

During the Partition of India, British Indian Army was divided 2:1 between the Dominions of India and Pakistan. Muslim personnel of the regiment were transferred to the Pakistan Army to form the Governor General's Bodyguard in Pakistan. The rest of the regiment, comprising the Sikhs, Jats and Rajputs remained with the Indian Army. The Viceroy's gold-plated buggy was coveted by both India and Pakistan. Its fate was decided by a coin toss between Colonel Thakur Govind Singh (India) and Sahabzada Yaqub Khan (Pakistan) and India won the buggy.

On January 27, 1950, the regiment was renamed the President's Bodyguard.

=== Names ===
The name of the regiment has changed throughout its history:

Year	Name
1773	Governor's Troop of Moghuls
1784	Governor-General's Bodyguard
1859	Viceroy's Body Guard
1944	44th Divisional Reconnaissance Squadron
1946	Governor-General's Bodyguard
1950	President's Bodyguard

=== Strength and ethnic composition ===
The President's Bodyguard is open to only Jats, Rajputs and Jat Sikh castes which are taken in equal numbers 33.3 percent from the states of Punjab, Haryana and Rajasthan. The basic height requirement for enlistment is 1.84 metres (6 ft 0 in). The regiment also has an operational role and has small unit on rotation to high altitude area, such as, Siachin, East Ladakh and Sikkim. The NCOs, JCOs and Officers of the regiment are trained tank-man, paratroopers, and horse-riders. There are about 100 horses in the regiment. This includes parade horses, polo ponies, and coach horses.

=== Battle honours ===
The President's Bodyguard has inherited the following battle honours:

- Java
- Ava
- Maharajpoor
- Moodkee
- Ferozeshah
- Aliwal
- Sobraon

all of which, except for "Java", are considered to be repugnant and cannot be carried on regimental colours.

== Operational history ==
The President's Bodyguard has seen action in all of independent India's major wars. It rendered yeoman service in the capital and helped reinstate confidence in the general public in the aftermath of the Partition of India.

After independence, Humber and Daimler armoured cars formed the mounts of the regiment and were deployed in the defense of Chushul at heights above 14,000 ft during the 1962 Sino-Indian War.

The regiment participated in Operation Ablaze in the Indo-Pakistani War of 1965. The regiment served in Siachen glacier, where it has been serving till date with a section (6-20 troops) led by a JCO. A detachment of the regiment was a part of the Indian Peace Keeping Force (IPKF) to Sri Lanka during 1988–89, and Indian contingents to the UN Peace Keeping Forces in Somalia, Angola and Sierra Leone.

== Standards, guidons & banners ==
Each successive viceroy presented a banner to the Bodyguard upon assuming office; the banners of previous viceroys being kept in the custody of the regiment. The practice continues in effect until the present day with each President of India presenting a silver trumpet to the regiment - although the coat-of-arms of the Viceroy is replaced by the monogram of the President.

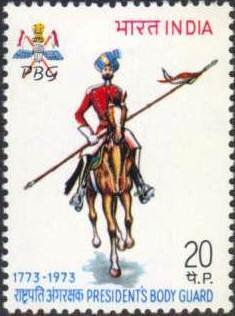
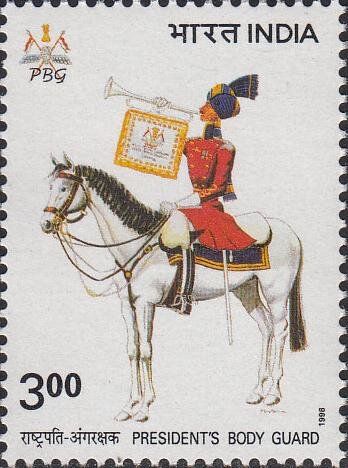
India Post stamps dedicated to President's Bodyguard

The first trumpet with banner of the President was presented by Rajendra Prasad on 14 May 1957. It had a maroon background with the emblem and crest in gold thread. The design incorporated the initials of Rajendra Prasad in Devanagri script in the centre and four emblems in gold in all four corners of the banner, from the Presidential Standard of India. Prasad's personal standard was presented to the regiment on 18 January 1958 by the President himself. In November 1958, President Prasad presented a new Regimental Standard to the regiment, the previous Regimental Standard having been laid up after India became a republic. The old regimental standard rests in the Regiment Officer's mess.

The second president of India, Sarvepalli Radhakrishnan presented his banner to the regiment on 21 October 1962. His banner, with a grey background with emblem and crest in gold thread, incorporated his initials in Devanagari script in the center and four emblems in gold in the four corners, from the presidential standard. The new President's Standard of the Body Guard and the Regimental Standard were awarded by President Radhakrishnan on 11 November 1963. The Regimental Standard is dark blue in colour with the regimental crest in the centre surrounded by lotus flowers and Ashoka leaves. Five scrolls on either side of the crest record the regiment's Battle Honours and the standard bears the motto "Bharat Mata ki Jai".

== Present status ==
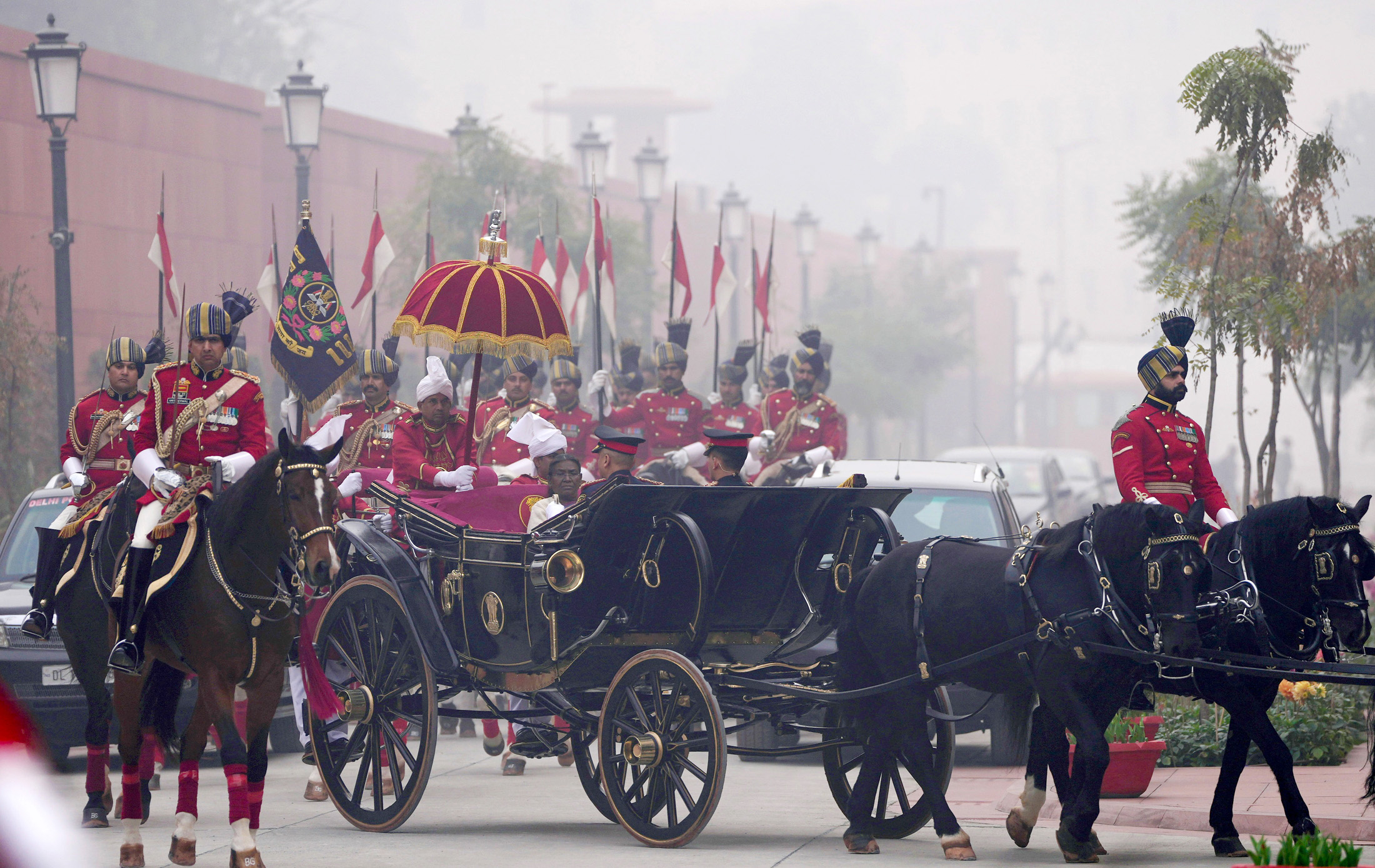
The President's Bodyguard with the President arriving at Parliament House

In 2003, the President's Bodyguard had an establishment of 7 officers, 15 JCOs, and 140 enlisted men, for a total strength of 180. Throughout its history, the Bodyguard has varied in size from 50 men, when first raised, to 1,929 men in 1845. However, since 1950, it has usually around squadron size, or about 130 men.

By tradition, the commanding officer has always been a brigadier or colonel. Recruitment to the regiment in India is now 1/3 each from Sikh Jats, Hindu Jats, and Rajputs, with officers and administrative staff from all over India. Its current commanding officer is Colonel Amit Berwal and the second-in-command is Lieutenant Colonel Angad Singh Thind.

== Gallery ==
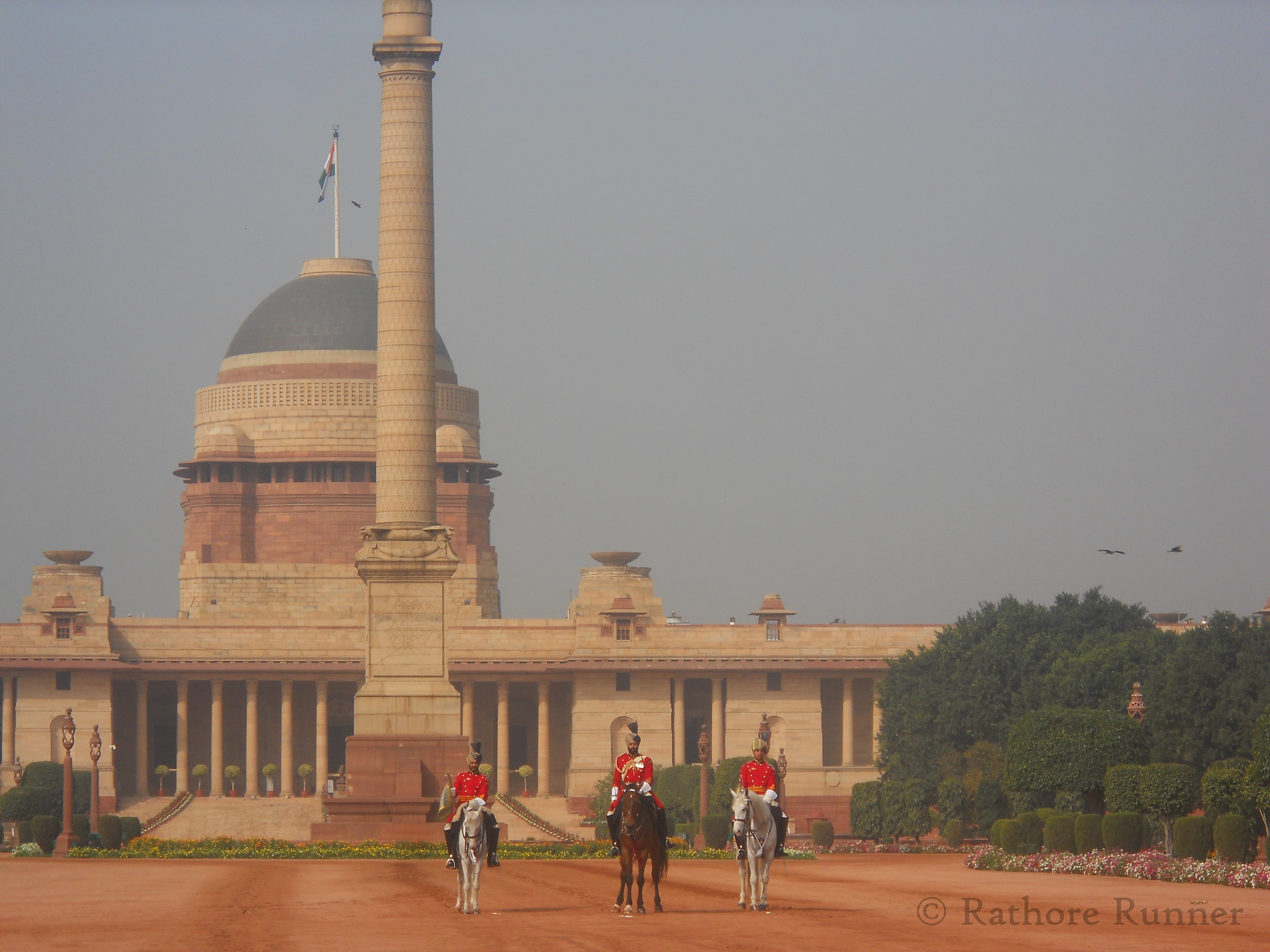
Guard-changing ceremony outside the Rashtrapati Bhavan (President's House)

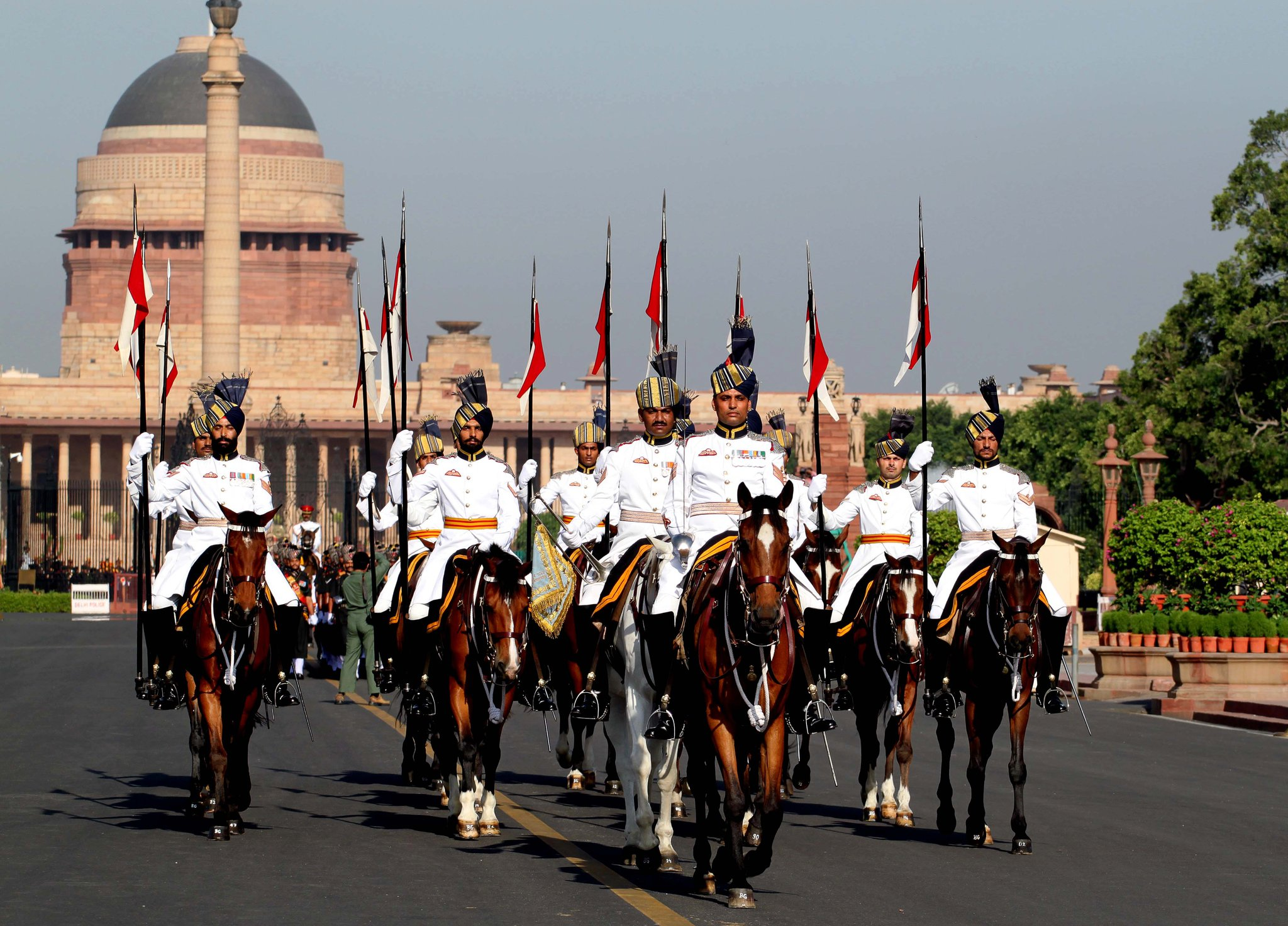
President's Bodyguard in summer ceremonial uniforms during changing of the guard

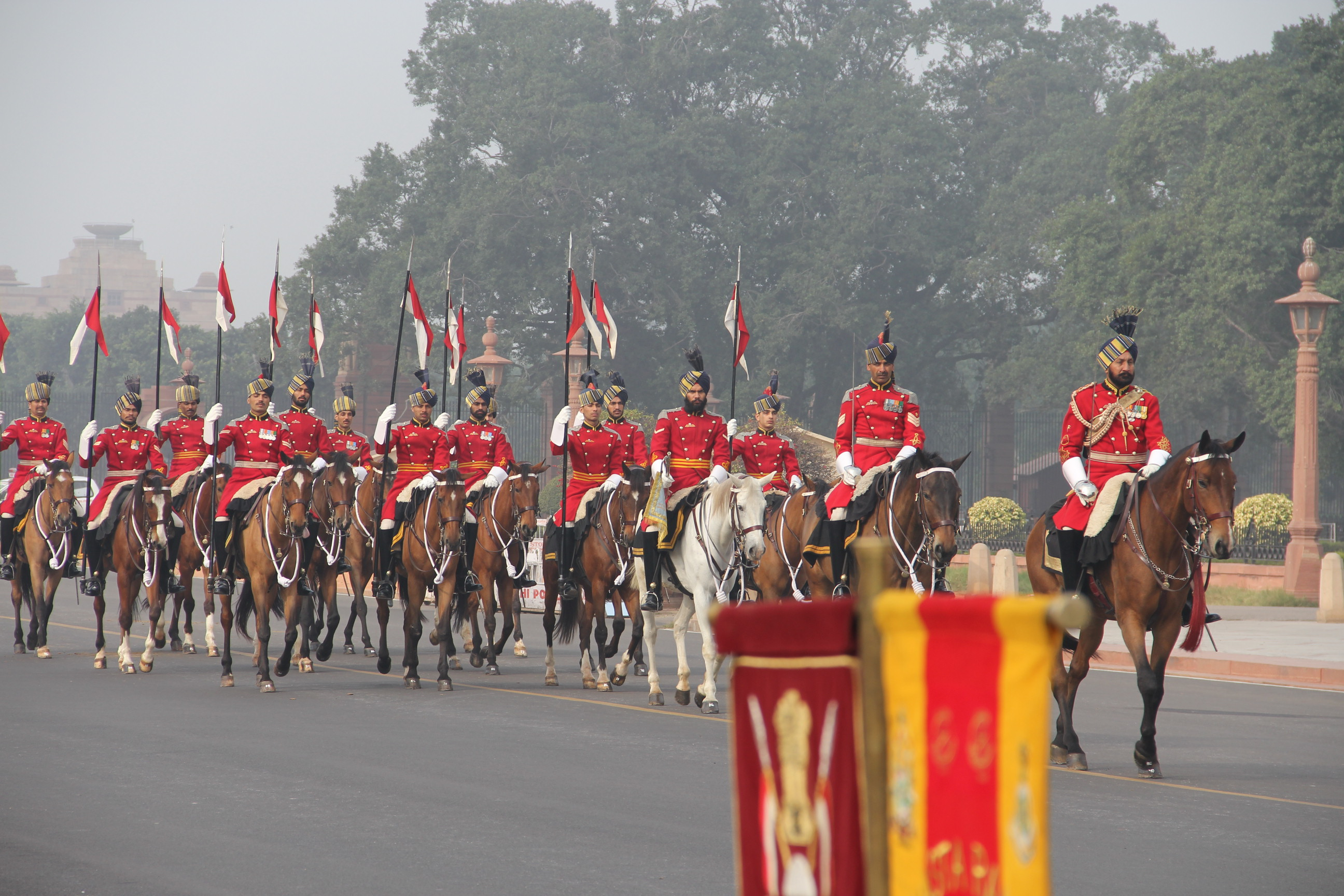
President's Bodyguard coming out of the Rashtrapati Bhavan in their winter ceremonial dress

Colonel T. S. Mundi, then commandant of the regiment, during full-dress rehearsal on 23 January 2013

Major Amit Bhardwaj moving towards forecourt of Rashtrapati Bhavan during full dress rehearsal on 23 January 2013

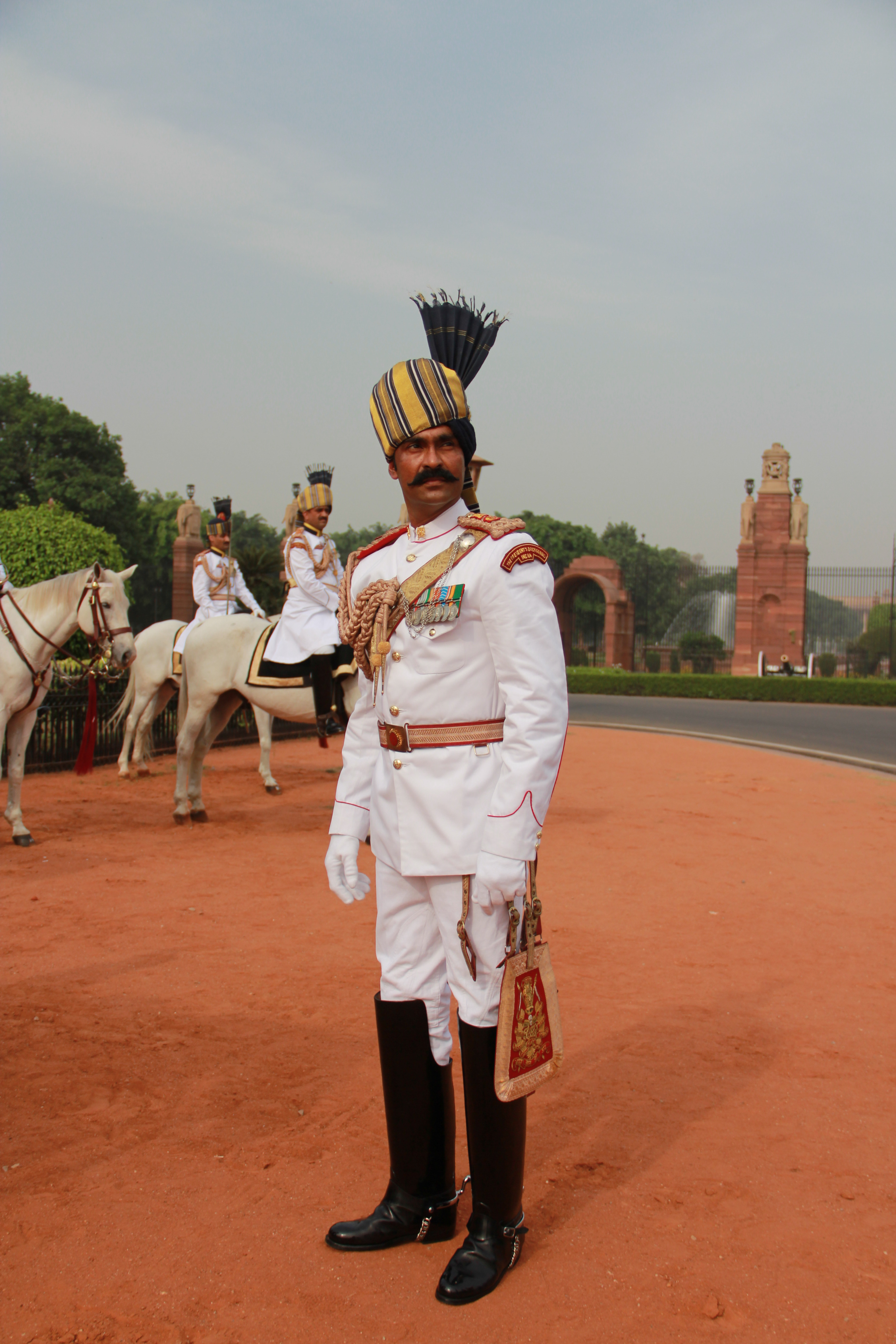
Lt. Col. Mahender Singh (former second-in-command of the regiment) in summer ceremonial uniform

Major Bhawani Singh at the Changing of the Guard

The PBG team winning the FIP Ambassadors Cup Polo, its most important polo trophy ever won.

== Commandants ==
S.No	Rank and Name	Parent Regiment	From	To
1	Captain Sweny Toone	–	1773	27 Jan 1777
2	Major H. Briscoe	–	27 Jan 1777	6 Apr 1778
3	Captain W. Palmer	3 Native Infantry	6 Apr 1778	30 Apr 1782
4	Lieutenant T. Polhill	1 Native Infantry	30 Apr 1782	4 Jul 1782
5	Lieutenant S. Turner	12 Native Infantry	4 Jul 1782	18 Mar 1799
6	Captain C. Fraser	7 Bengal Native Cavalry	18 Mar 1799	15 Apr 1800
7	Captain H.C. Montgomery	Madras Establishment	15 Apr 1800	1 Sep 1802
8	Major F.A. Daniell	Madras Establishment	1 Sep 1802	Feb 1806
9	Captain G.H. Gall	8 Bengal Native Cavalry	Feb 1806	21 Jun 1818
10	Captain W.H. Rainey	4 Bengal Light Cavalry	21 Jun 1818	14 Oct 1820
11	Captain R.H. Sneyd	1 Bengal Cavalry	14 Oct 1820	3 Mar 1827
12	Major E.J. Honywood	7 Light Cavalry	3 Mar 1827	3 Apr 1834
13	Captain C.D. Dawkins	2 Light Cavalry	3 Apr 1834	18 Dec 1845
14	Captain T. Quin	4 Light Cavalry	18 Dec 1845	25 Jun 1846
15	Lieutenant E.G. Crossman	45 Native Infantry	25 Jun 1846	16 Jan 1847
16	Major W. Mayne	37 Native Infantry	16 Jan 1847	11 Apr 1851
17	Major W.A.A. Thomson	9 Light Cavalry / 4 Bengal European Cavalry	12 Apr 1851	4 Mar 1862
18	Colonel G. Delane	6 Light Cavalry	4 Mar 1862	13 Nov 1874
19	Major H.P. Peacock	3rd European Light Cavalry	13 Nov 1874	9 Jan 1878
20	Major G.C. Jackson	2nd Bengal European Cavalry	9 Jan 1878	13 Dec 1883
21	Captain C.W. Muir	6 Bengal Cavalry	13 Dec 1883	6 Jan 1889
22	Captain R.C. Onslow	10 Bengal Lancers	7 Jan 1889	7 Jan 1894
23	Major J.G. Turner	4 Cavalry	7 Jan 1894	21 Jul 1898
24	Major R.E. Grimston	6 King Edward's Own Cavalry	21 Jul 1898	2 Mar 1904
25	Captain H.N. Holden	5 Cavalry	2 Mar 1904	2 Mar 1909
26	Lieutenant V.A.S. Keighley	18 PWO Tiwana Lancers	2 Mar 1909	1 Apr 1915
27	Captain W.A.S. de Gale	22 Cavalry	1 Apr 1915	16 Jun 1917
28	Captain A. Brooke	18 PWO Tiwana Lancers	16 Jun 1917	5 May 1922
29	Major E.G. Atkinson	15 Lancers	5 May 1922	13 Sep 1927
30	Major M.D. Vigors, DSO, MC	Hodson's Horse	13 Sep 1927	29 May 1931
31	Captain W.R.B. Peel	19 Lancers	29 May 1931	4 Oct 1936
32	Major H.I. Mostyn-Owen	19 Lancers	4 Oct 1936	20 Oct 1943
33	Major J.R.L. Tweed	IAC	20 Oct 1943	18 Dec 1945
34	Major P. Massey, MC	Baluch Regiment	18 Dec 1945	31 Dec 1947
35	Major Thakur Govind Singh	61 Cavalry	31 Dec 1947	24 Sep 1950
36	Major S.K. Bharat Singh	2 Lancers	25 Sep 1950	27 Apr 1954
37	Major S.G. Srinivasan	1 Horse	28 Apr 1954	14 Jul 1957
38	Major Mohammad Mirza	61 Cavalry	1 Aug 1957	15 Nov 1962
39	Major S.K. Pudumjee	1 Horse	16 Nov 1962	11 Oct 1966
40	Major Surat Singh	1 Horse	12 Oct 1966	7 Sep 1971
41	Major P.K. Mehra	61 Cavalry	8 Sep 1971	24 Apr 1975
42	Major V.P. Singh	61 Cavalry	25 Apr 1975	22 Sep 1980
43	Colonel H.S. Sodhi, VSM	61 Cavalry	23 Sep 1980	30 Sep 1987
44	Colonel M.S. Sandhu	82 Armoured Regiment	14 Apr 1988	8 Jan 1991
45	Colonel Aditya Singh	9 Horse	9 Jan 1991	21 Jun 1994
46	Colonel D.C. Katoch	76 Armoured Regiment	22 Jun 1994	28 Oct 1995
47	Colonel K.M.S. Shergill	17 Horse	29 Oct 1995	4 Oct 1999
48	Colonel G.S. Malhi	5 Armoured Regiment	5 Oct 1999	19 Jul 2002
49	Colonel Bhawani Singh	61 Cavalry	20 Jul 2002	30 Aug 2005
50	Colonel A.A. Mahmood, VSM	16 Cavalry	31 Aug 2005	20 Nov 2008
51	Colonel A. Bhanot	89 Armoured Regiment	21 Nov 2008	23 Jun 2011
52	Colonel T.S. Mundi	46 Armoured Regiment	24 Jun 2011	23 Mar 2015
53	Colonel Dhiraj Chengappa	1 Horse	24 Mar 2015	–

== Adjutants ==
S.No	Rank and Name	Parent Regiment	From	To
1	Lieutenant W. Mercer	2 Bengal Native Cavalry	1784	1796
2	Captain H.C. Montgomery	Madras Establishment	1799	1800
3	Lieutenant F.A. Daniell	4 Madras Native Cavalry	15 Apr 1800	1 Sep 1802
4	Lieutenant G.H. Gall	8 Bengal Native Cavalry	1 Sep 1802	13 Mar 1806
5	Lieutenant W.G.A. Fielding	7 Bengal Native Cavalry	13 Mar 1806	15 Feb 1812
6	Lieutenant C.S. Waring	7 Bengal Native Cavalry	15 Feb 1812	1813
7	Cornet G.J. Shadwell	2 Bengal Native Cavalry	14 May 1813	27 Jan 1821
8	Lieutenant H.L. Worrall	1 Bengal Light Cavalry	27 Jan 1821	1 Sep 1825
9	Lieutenant J.D. Dyke	4 Bengal Light Cavalry	6 May 1825	9 Sep 1825
10	Lieutenant C.D. Dawkins	2 Light Cavalry	9 Sep 1825	3 Mar 1827
11	Lieutenant W. Wingfield	10 Bengal Light Cavalry	23 Mar 1827	15 Nov 1831
12	Lieutenant J. Hamilton	9 Bengal Light Cavalry	15 Nov 1831	3 Apr 1834
13	Lieutenant J.A.D. Fergusson	6 Light Cavalry	17 Jun 1834	20 Dec 1842
14	Lieutenant W. Mayne	37 Native Infantry / Bengal Irregular Cavalry	20 Dec 1842	10 Feb 1844
15	Lieutenant N.B. Chamberlain	16 Native Infantry	10 Feb 1844	13 Mar 1845
16	Lieutenant W. Fisher	10 Light Cavalry	13 Mar 1845	18 Dec 1845
17	Lieutenant T.T. Tucker	8 Bengal Light Cavalry	7 Jan 1846	5 Mar 1846
18	Lieutenant G.D. Pakenham	4 Bengal Light Cavalry	5 Mar 1846	12 Apr 1851
19	Lieutenant H.A.I. Ellis	1 Bengal Light Cavalry	12 Apr 1851	4 Jun 1852
20	Lieutenant H. Durrant	5 Light Cavalry	4 Jun 1852	11 Apr 1853
21	Lieutenant H.P. Peacock	3 Bengal European Cavalry	6 Oct 1859	3 Mar 1862
22	Lieutenant H.B. Lockwood	4 European Light Cavalry	11 Mar 1862	12 Feb 1863
23	Lieutenant T.F.C. Rochfort	4 Bengal European Cavalry	12 Feb 1863	20 Dec 1864
24	Lieutenant W.A. Lawrence	21 Hussars	20 Dec 1864	2 Mar 1869
25	Lieutenant T. Deane	21 Hussars	20 Jan 1868	2 Mar 1869
26	Captain C.W. Muir	6 Bengal Cavalry	19 Jan 1877	18 Oct 1878
27	Lieutenant D.A.W. Thuillier	17 Bengal Cavalry	22 Oct 1878	13 Jun 1881
28	Lieutenant R.C. Onslow	10 Bengal Lancers	24 Jun 1881	9 Apr 1886
29	Lieutenant J.G. Turner	4 Cavalry	9 Apr 1886	26 Mar 1891
30	Lieutenant R.E. Grimston	6 King Edward's Own Cavalry	9 Apr 1891	24 May 1893
31	Lieutenant W.R. Birdwood	11 Bengal Lancers	24 May 1893	21 Nov 1898
32	Captain I.G. White	16 Bengal Cavalry	21 Nov 1898	26 Mar 1900
33	Lieutenant G.N. Hood	Central India Horse	26 Mar 1900	1 Oct 1900
34	Captain H.N. Holden	5 Cavalry	26 Oct 1900	1 Mar 1904
35	Captain V.A.S. Keighley	18 PWO Tiwana Lancers	28 Apr 1904	2 Mar 1909
36	Captain V.C.P. Hodson	10 Hodson's Horse	2 Mar 1909	15 Apr 1913
37	Captain I.R.V. Shirston	11 King Edward's Own Lancers	16 Apr 1913	17 Apr 1917
38	Captain E.V.F. Seymour	9 Hodson's Horse	9 Sep 1918	3 Jan 1919
39	Captain G.B. Harvey	5 Cavalry	11 Mar 1919	1922
40	Captain R.T. Lawrence, MC	4 Hodson's Horse	1922	1925
41	Captain A.I.B. Anderson	15 Lancers	1925	1927
42	Captain H.I. Mostyn Owen	19 Lancers	1927	7 Jan 1928
43	Captain J.W. Davidson, MC	Probyn's Horse	7 Jan 1928	14 Oct 1930
44	Captain W.R.B. Peel	19 Lancers	14 Oct 1930	5 Jun 1931
45	Captain T.G. Atherton	Royal Deccan Horse	5 Jun 1931	5 Jun 1935
46	Captain C.R. Budgen	3 Cavalry	5 Jun 1935	6 Mar 1939
47	Captain R.G. Hammer	21 Prince Albert Victor's Own Cavalry	25 Feb 1943	5 Jan 1946
48	Lieutenant P.A.O. Marriot	21 Prince Albert Victor's Own Cavalry	25 Feb 1943	5 Jan 1946
49	Captain H.C. Badhwar, MBE	3 Cavalry	23 Feb 1946	31 Oct 1946
50	Captain S. Mohammad Yakub Khan	18 Cavalry	13 Nov 1946	17 Nov 1947
51	Captain K.G.S. Bedi	Skinner's Horse	17 Nov 1947	18 Aug 1948
52	Captain S.K. Bharat Singh	2 Lancers	1 Nov 1948	24 Sep 1950
53	Captain S.G. Srinivasan	1 Horse	4 Jan 1951	27 May 1954
54	Captain M.K. Bhawani Singh	3 Cavalry	3 May 1954	21 Nov 1962
55	Captain H.S. Sodhi	61 Cavalry	22 Nov 1962	22 May 1966
56	Captain R.K.S. Kalaan	61 Cavalry	23 May 1966	22 Dec 1969
57	Captain T.S. Shergill	9 Horse	23 Jun 1969	16 Dec 1971
58	Captain Bijendra Singh	14 Horse	18 Feb 1972	24 May 1975
59	Captain Aditya Singh	9 Horse	25 May 1975	25 Jun 1978
60	Captain Hardeep Singh	17 Horse	1 Jul 1978	5 Dec 1982
61	Captain P.S. Bedi	83 Armoured Regiment	6 Dec 1982	26 Mar 1987
62	Major Rakesh Passi	12 Armoured Regiment	27 Mar 1987	1 Apr 1990
63	Major Y.K. Singh	61 Cavalry	2 Apr 1990	13 Aug 1992
64	Major A.A. Mahmood	16 Cavalry	14 Aug 1992	5 Jun 1995
65	Major Bhawani Singh	61 Cavalry	6 Jun 1995	23 Aug 1998
66	Major S.S. Rathore	61 Cavalry	24 Aug 1998	5 Sep 2001
67	Major Bhanu Pratap Singh	51 Armoured Regiment	6 Sep 2001	3 Mar 2004
68	Lieutenant Colonel Sanjay Bhatia	49 Armoured Regiment	4 Mar 2004	18 Feb 2008
69	Lieutenant Colonel Ravinder Narwal, SM	46 Armoured Regiment	19 Feb 2008	26 Jun 2010
70	Lieutenant Colonel Mahendra Singh	2 Lancers	27 Jun 2010	29 May 2012
71	Lieutenant Colonel Amit Bhardwaj	52 Armoured Regiment	30 May 2012	–

== See also ==
- Tri-Services Guard of Honour (India)
- Samman Guard
- President Guard Regiment (Bangladesh)
- President's Bodyguard (Pakistan)
- Household Cavalry (United Kingdom)
