= R. K. S. Kalaan =

Colonel R. K. S. Kalaan
- Born: Rajinder Kumar Singh Kalaan; 1940
- Died: 4 March 2019 (aged 78–79); New Delhi, India
- Spouse: Sunny Kalaan
- Children: 2, including Angad Kalaan and Uday Kalaan
- Military career
- Allegiance: India
- Branch: Indian Army
- Service years: 1966–1983
- Rank: Colonel
- Units: President's Bodyguard; 61st Cavalry
- Commands: 61st Cavalry (1980–1983)
- Other work: Polo player and coach

Colonel Rajinder Kumar Singh "Raj" Kalaan (1940 – 4 March 2019) was an Indian Army cavalry officer and polo player. He commanded the 61st Cavalry, the Indian Army's horsed cavalry regiment, from 1980 to 1983, played for India with a handicap of +5, and after retirement became one of the leading figures of elephant polo in Nepal and Thailand and a co-founder of polo's revival in Mongolia.

== Military career ==
Kalaan was commissioned into the Indian Army and from 1966 served three years with the President's Bodyguard, the ceremonial horsed unit of the President of India. He then spent fourteen years with the 61st Cavalry, the regiment that has supplied most of India's army polo players since the 1950s, and commanded it from 1980 to 1983, retiring in the rank of colonel.

== Polo ==
Kalaan played polo throughout his service, reaching a handicap of +5, and represented India at the World Cup. He later said that his happiest years had been spent playing polo in Jaipur.

After leaving the army he settled on a farm outside Delhi, where he coached young players, and in 2001 his family founded the Haryana Polo Club near Gurgaon, of which he was a founding member. He was regularly present at polo tournaments in India, Nepal, Sri Lanka and Thailand, and was known for offering unsolicited tactical advice from the sidelines.

=== Elephant polo ===
Kalaan was a long-standing figure at the World Elephant Polo Championships held each year near the Meghauli airstrip in Chitwan National Park, Nepal, where before every match he reviewed the rules designed to protect the elephants and their riders. He was described by PRI as "an elephant polo forerunner". He also played in the King's Cup elephant polo tournament in Thailand, captaining a side in 2009.

=== Mongolia ===
In 1996 Kalaan and the Nepal-based hotelier Jim Edwards helped reintroduce polo to Mongolia at a riding camp on the Orkhon River, and he was among the founders of what became the Genghis Khan Retreat and Polo Club in the Orkhon Valley. He and his wife returned each July to coach the local herdsmen in the rules and ethics of the game.

== Personal life and death ==
Kalaan was married to Sunny Kalaan. Their sons, Angad and Uday Kalaan, both became professional polo players and have represented India; the Nepali Times observed in 2019 that the two "made up half the Indian national polo team". Angad and Uday Kalaan also won the King's Cup elephant polo tournament in Thailand in 2017.

Kalaan died on 4 March 2019 and was cremated at the Army crematorium at Delhi Cantonment. Lisa Choegyal, writing in the Nepali Times, called him "the epitome of polo".
