= Govind Singh (colonel) =

Colonel Thakur Govind Singh
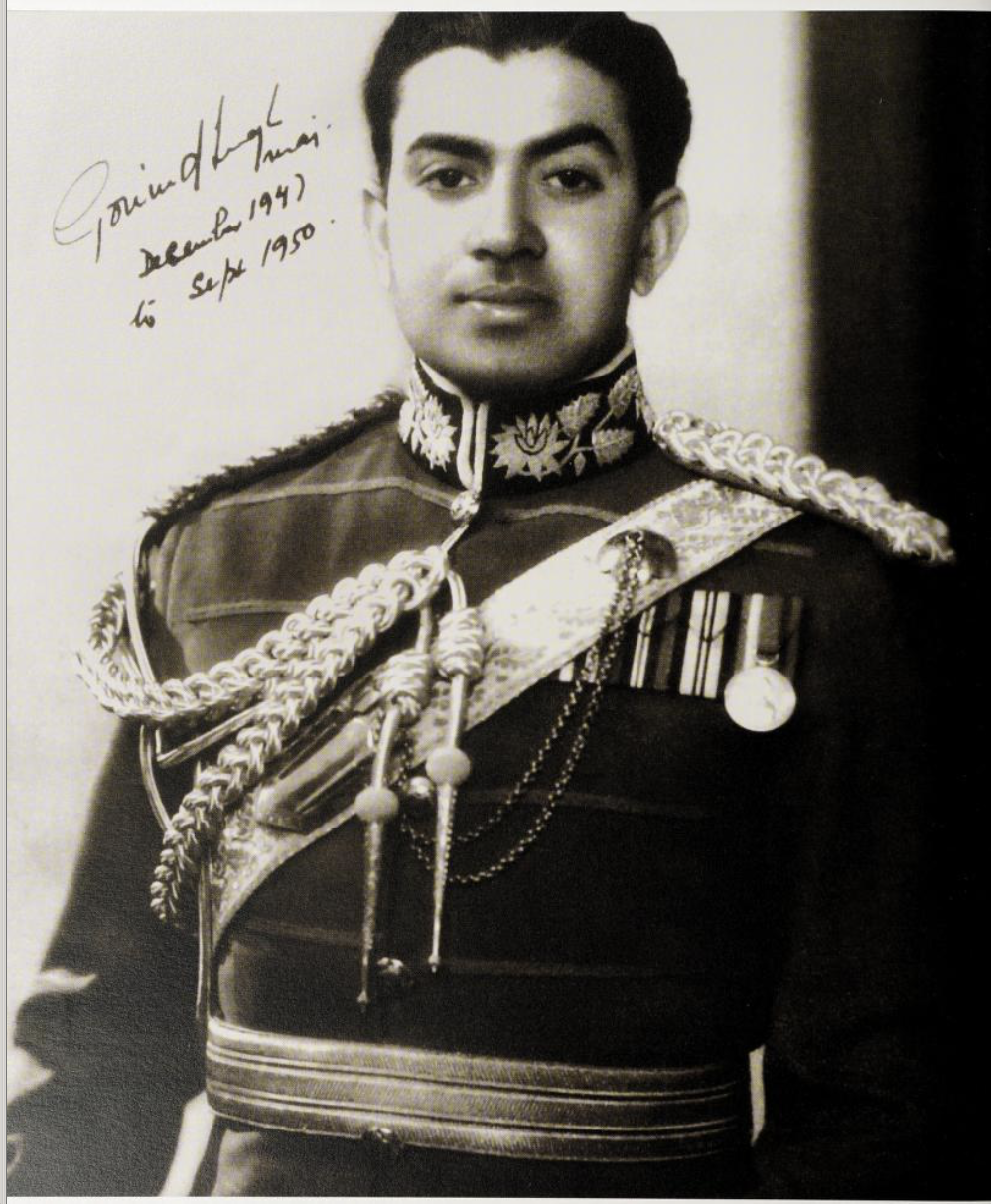
- Born: 12 October 1921; Jaipur, India
- Military career
- Allegiance: Jaipur State (1942–1947); British Raj (1942–1947); India (1947–1972)
- Branch: British Indian Army; Indian Army
- Rank: Colonel
- Units: Rajendra Hazari Guards; Sawai Man Guards; Governor General's Bodyguard; President's Bodyguard; Central India Horse; 61st Cavalry
- Commands: President's Bodyguard; 61st Cavalry
- Conflicts: World War II; North African campaign; Italian campaign; Indo-Pakistan War of 1965
- Awards: 1939–1945 Star; Africa Star; War Medal 1939–1945

Colonel Thakur Govind Singh (born 12 October 1921) was an Indian Army officer who served as the inaugural Indian Commandant of the President's Bodyguard (PBG). During a military career spanning three decades, he saw active service in World War II and the Indo-Pakistani War of 1965, later commanding the 61st Cavalry.

== Early life ==
Govind Singh was born on 12 October 1921 in Jaipur, British India, into a Tomar Rajput family. His father, Major General Sir Thakur Bhairon Singh of Khatipura, was an officer in the Jaipur State Forces. Singh was the third son in his family; his older brothers also pursued military careers, including Colonel Thakur Harnath Singh Major General Kanwar Zorawar Singh, MC, who served with the Central India Horse. He received his early education at The Doon School in Dehradun before entering military service during the Second World War.

== Military career ==
Singh was initially commissioned into the Rajendra Hazari Guards of the Jaipur State Forces in 1942. In 1944, he transferred to the Sawai Man Guards and deployed overseas. During World War II, he served with his regiment in Egypt and Italy, and later participated in the post-war occupation of Hong Kong.

Following the war, he was appointed as an Aide-de-Camp (ADC) to Field Marshal Sir Claude Auchinleck, the Commander-in-Chief of the British Indian Army. In this capacity, Singh represented the Indian armed forces at the 1946 London Victory Parade.

=== Command of the President's Bodyguard ===
Prior to India's independence, Lord Mountbatten selected Singh to take over command of the Governor General's Bodyguard (GGBG) from its departing British officers. Following his promotion to Major, Singh officially served as the 35th Commandant—and the first Indian Commandant—of the unit from 31 December 1947 to 24 September 1950.

During the partition of India, Singh worked alongside his Pakistani counterpart, Major Sahibzada Yaqub Khan, to divide the assets of the bodyguard regiment between the two newly independent nations. A notable incident occurred regarding the ownership of the gold and silver-plated buggies previously used by the Viceroy of India. With neither side willing to relinquish the gold carriage, Commander Peter Hows suggested a coin toss to decide the inheritance. Using a 1 rupee silver coin, Singh called heads and won the toss, securing the gold carriage for India while the silver set went to Pakistan. This historic gold-plated buggy is still used in India today to celebrate the newly elected president.

During the partition of India, Singh worked alongside his Pakistani counterpart, Major Sahibzada Yakub Khan, to divide the assets of the bodyguard regiment between the two newly independent nations. Singh later recorded that they divided the assets "in a very friendly manner in the shortest possible time". A notable incident occurred regarding the ownership of the gold and silver-plated buggies previously used by the Viceroy of India. With neither side willing to relinquish the gold carriage, Commander Peter Hows of the Royal Navy, who served as the senior aide-de-camp to Lord Mountbatten, suggested a coin toss to decide the inheritance. Yakub Khan allowed Singh to call the toss. Using a 1 rupee silver coin, Singh called heads and won, securing the gold carriage for India, while the silver set was sent to Karachi for Muhammad Ali Jinnah. This historic gold-plated buggy is still used in India today to celebrate the newly elected president.

Following the partition, the regiment's composition was reorganized to compensate for the transfer of Punjabi Muslim troops to Pakistan. The initial batch of Rajput soldiers brought into the PBG came primarily from the Rajendra Hazari Guards of the Jaipur State Forces, which was Singh's parent regiment.

Under Singh's tenure, the unit officially transitioned into the President's Bodyguard upon India becoming a republic in 1950. A lasting legacy of his command is the PBG commandant's ceremonial crop, or "baton", which is passed from the outgoing commandant to the incoming one. This crop is inscribed with the names of all the commandants, beginning with Major Thakur Govind Singh's name as the first post-Independence Indian commandant.

=== Later Service ===
In 1953, Singh transferred to the Central India Horse, an armored regiment, to gain experience in mechanized warfare. He later served as an instructor at the National Defence Academy (NDA) in Khadakwasla from 1958 to 1961.

In 1961, he was appointed as the Commandant of the 61st Cavalry, the Indian Army's primary horsed cavalry regiment. He led the regiment during the Indo-Pakistani War of 1965, where his unit was deployed for border reconnaissance and patrol duties in the Rajasthan sector.

A notable polo player, Singh is recognized as one of the legends of Indian polo, alongside figures such as V.P. Singh and Sodhi. His frontline military career was curtailed following a severe polo injury in 1967 that resulted in the loss of an eye. He subsequently transitioned to training roles, serving as a Group Commander and later deputy director for the National Cadet Corps (NCC) in Uttar Pradesh and Rajasthan. He retired from active service in October 1972.

== Personal life ==
Following his retirement, Singh settled in Jaipur. He married Sneh Kumari of Garrauli State, and the couple had two children. In 1972, he commissioned the construction of a Spanish-style residence in Jaipur known as "Shiv Saya," designed by the Austrian architect Karl Malte von Heinz.
