= Delhi Greens =

Indian organization

- Abbreviation: DG
- Formation: March 2007
- Founder: Govind Singh, Ravinder Bawa, and Aastha Kukreti
- Type: Non-governmental organisation (registered society)
- Legal status: Tax exempted
- Headquarters: New Delhi
- Location: New Delhi
- Coordinates: 22.3753°N 77.1039°E
- Region served: Delhi, India
- Director: Govind Singh
- Director: Ravinder Bawa
- Director: Aastha Kukreti
- Website: www.delhigreens.org

Delhi Greens is a non-governmental organisation, founded by the trio Govind Singh, Ravinder Bawa, and Aastha Kukreti, for spreading the messages of green environment and sustainable development and working towards achieving those goals. The organisation is headquartered in New Delhi, India.

== Profile ==
Delhi Greens was founded by Dr. Govind Singh PhD, a university professor at the Department of Environment, University of Delhi, and his like-minded friends, A.P. Jayanthi, Rishabh Parmar, Ravinder Bawa and Aastha Kukreti, and was registered as a society (Regn No. 3566) in 2007.

== Mission and objectives ==
The value of a tree is priceless. We were forced to put a price tag on them because the system is hell bent on cutting them and the only way we can make them realise their value is through monetary terms, says Govind Singh, co-founder of Delhi Greens, about the economic value of a tree in terms of oxygen it produces, which the organisation put at ₹ 31,51 million.

Delhi Greens has a mandated mission to educate the masses and invite their participation in the demand for sustainable development. It proposes to propagate the message of environmentalism and green economy and support the global initiatives with these goals. It also intends to act as a watchdog for protecting the forests and biodiversity of India.

The declared objectives of the organisation are:

- To work as an information's hub for green environment by storing and disseminating information about global views, news and expert opinions.
- To support, promote and initiate green campaigns in India.
- To educate the youth about the environmental issues on climate change through training workshops, summits and seminars.
- To promote and support eco-tourism and use it as a tool for creating awareness among the public on environmental conservation.
- To provide a common meeting ground of interaction for environmental agencies, government departments, private agencies and general public.
- To prompt and assist corporates in discharging their Corporate Social Responsibility (CSR).

== Programmes ==
Delhi Greens operations may broadly be classified under three protocols. Efforts on dissemination of information and creation of public awareness are considered a priority by the organisation. It regularly organises seminars independently or in coordination with other agencies. The Third Delhi Youth Summit on Climate Change (DYSoC 2013) was one such initiative for rallying the youth together, conceived and organised by Delhi Greens and supported by Cluster Innovation Centre of the University of Delhi.

Delhi Greens, one year of its inception, in 2008, took over Delhi Greens Blog (DGB), a web-based publication initiative started by one of the organisation's founders, Govind Singh. It is reported that the blog was started by Singh to create a platform for protest against the felling of heritage trees in New Delhi during the preparatory phase of the Commonwealth Games 2010; the action led a student protest later. The Blog has since become the mouthpiece of Delhi Greens and the first of an initiative named Green Media Network (GMN) initiative. Delhi Greens have extended the reach of their propaganda under GMN programme when, in 2010, they launched NE Greens, another portal modelled on DGB to cover the North Eastern states of Arunachal Pradesh, Assam, Meghalaya, Manipur, Mizoram, Nagaland, Tripura and Sikkim, reported to be the first of its kind in North East India. Delhi Greens are planning to strengthen the portal by appointing state wise coordinators in the eight states the portal covers.

Another mode of Delhi Greens activity is physical and vocal participation in environmental issues in the country. The organisation attempts to make its presence felt by airing pro environment opinions at various discussion forums on environment. During the proceedings of the complaint against Delhi Public Works Department alleging felling of trees for the Vikaspuri - Meera Bagh elevated highway project, Delhi Greens prepared an environmental impact study of the project which was later filed with the National Greens Tribunal of India. The organisation has also brought out similar reports pertaining to environmental issues in other areas.

Delhi Greens have also expanded their outreach to other parts of the country and the surrounding region. In Tibet, it organised a campaign, Earth-o-Care campaign in association with Women's Environment and Development Desk (WEDD) of the Tibetan Women's Association on the World Environment Day (5 June 2011). Their involvement in environmental campaigns initiated by other organisations are also reported such as their participation in Meri Dilli Meri Yamuna campaign in which they partnered with Nature Foundation (India), an environmental NGO based in Delhi and Art of Living.

== Awards and recognitions ==
Delhi Greens Blog, the official blog of Delhi Greens won the IB Awards as the Best Blog under Social and Environment category in 2013.

Delhi Greens Blog was listed by the United Nations as a Momentum for Change: Lighthouse Activity for developing Climate Resilience in 2018.
