= 37th Regiment of Bengal Native Infantry =

The 37th Regiment of Bengal Native Infantry was a regiment of the East India Company's Bengal Army, which had only become a separate regiment in 1824, and was later to become one of the regiments which took part in the Indian Rebellion of 1857 at Benares in 1857.
