= Governor General's Bodyguard =

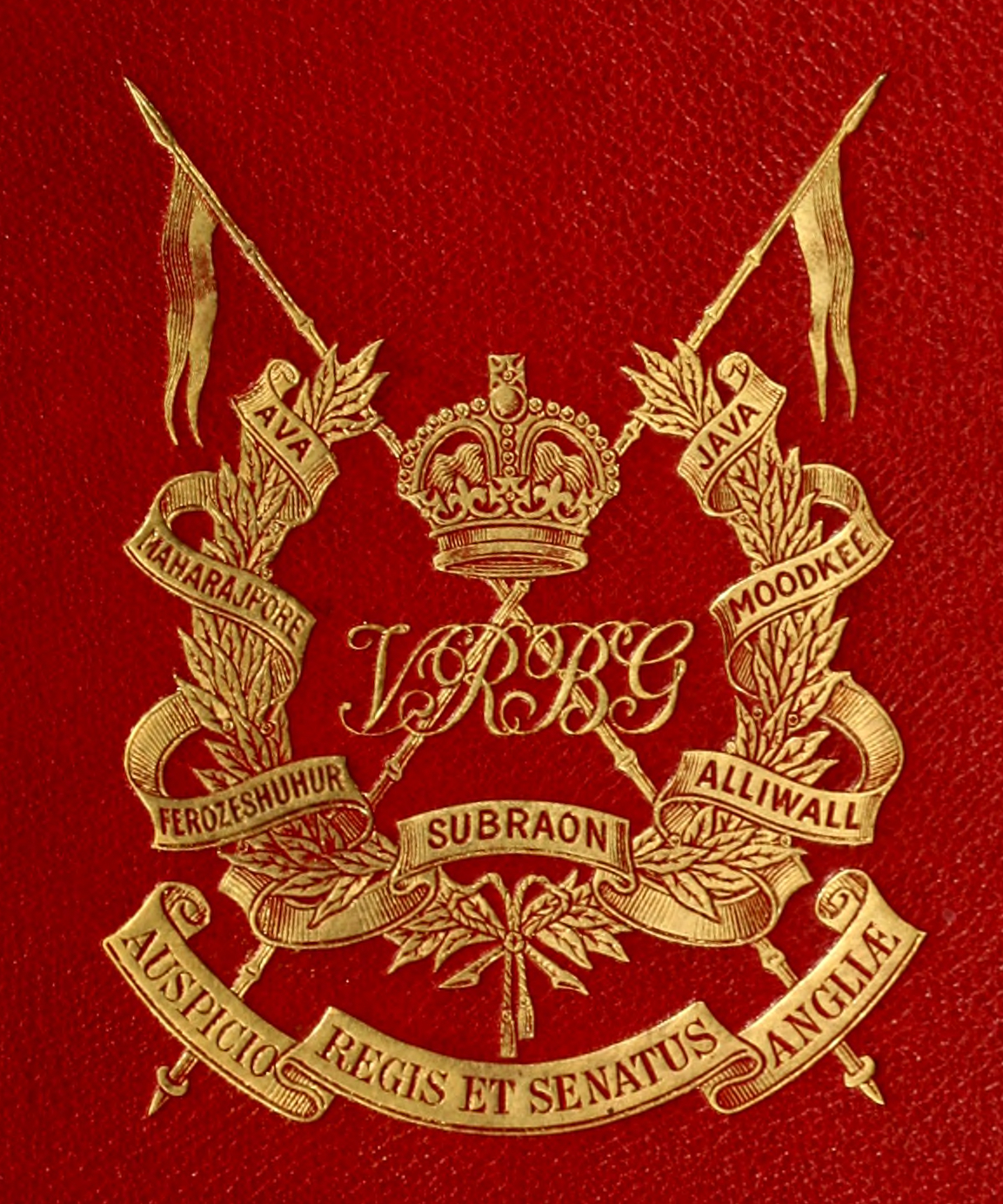
- Insignia of the Unit after it was renamed as Viceroy's Bodyguard
- Active: 1773 - 1950
- Country: (East India Company) Company ruled India; British India; Dominion of India
- Allegiance: Presidency armies British Indian Army; Indian Army
- Branch: Army
- Type: Cavalry, Royal guard
- Role: Household Cavalry
- Garrison/HQ: Ballygunge
- Motto: Auspicio Regis et Senatus Angliae
- Colors: Uniform: red; facings blue.
- Engagements: Operations against the Sanyasis, 1773-74 First Rohilla War; Insurrection of Maharaja Chait Singh, 1781; Third Anglo-Mysore War; French campaign in Egypt and Syria, 1801; Capture of Barabati fort, 1803 Second Anglo-Maratha War; Invasion of Java (1811); Paika Rebellion; Third Anglo-Maratha War; Kol uprising Barrackpore mutiny of 1824; First Burmese War; Gwalior War; First Anglo-Sikh War; Second Anglo-Sikh War; Santhal rebellion Indian Rebellion of 1857; Third Burmese War; North-West Frontier; Mesopotamia; World War I World War II
- Decorations: Capture of Seringapatam Egypt Medal (1801); Java Medal; Burma Medal; Gwalior Star; Sutlej Medal; Burma 1885 Army of India Medal
- Battle honours: Java; Ava; Mahrajapore; Moodkee; Ferozeshah; Aliwal; Sobraon

Commanders
- Notable commanders: William Mayne (1847-51)

Insignia
- Identification symbol: GGBG, later VRBG

The Governor General's Bodyguard was a cavalry regiment of the British Indian Army and served as the British Indian equivalent to the Household Cavalry of the British Army.

== History ==
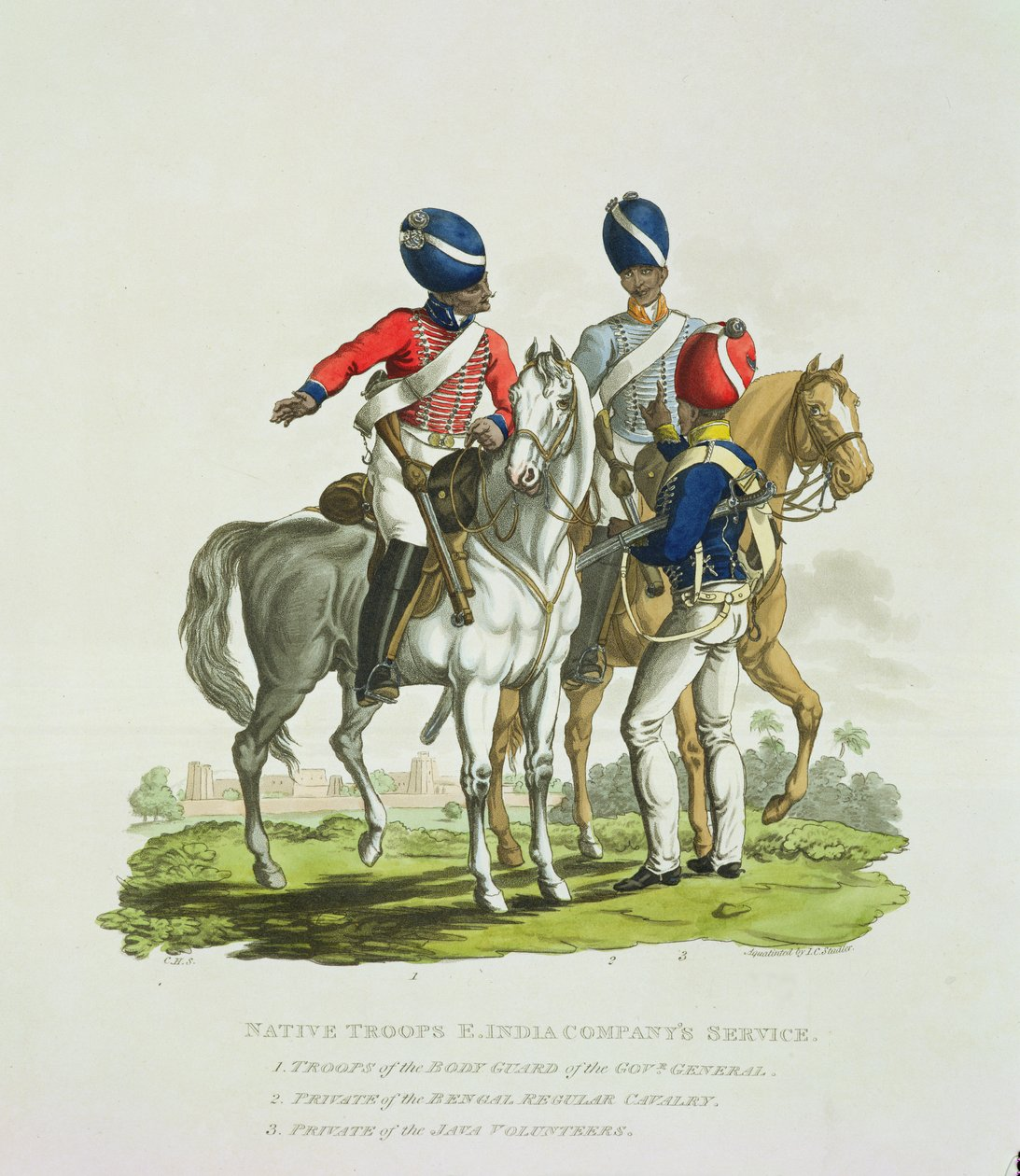
1815 engraving of a regimental sepoy (left)

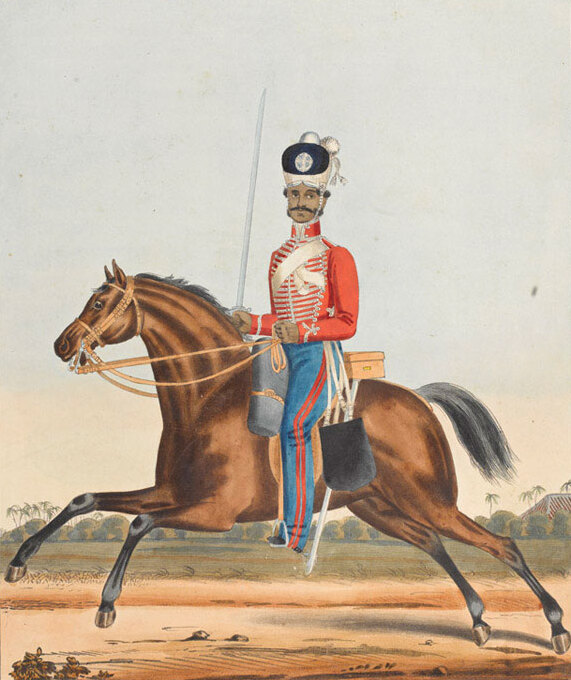
1841 illustration of a regimental sepoy

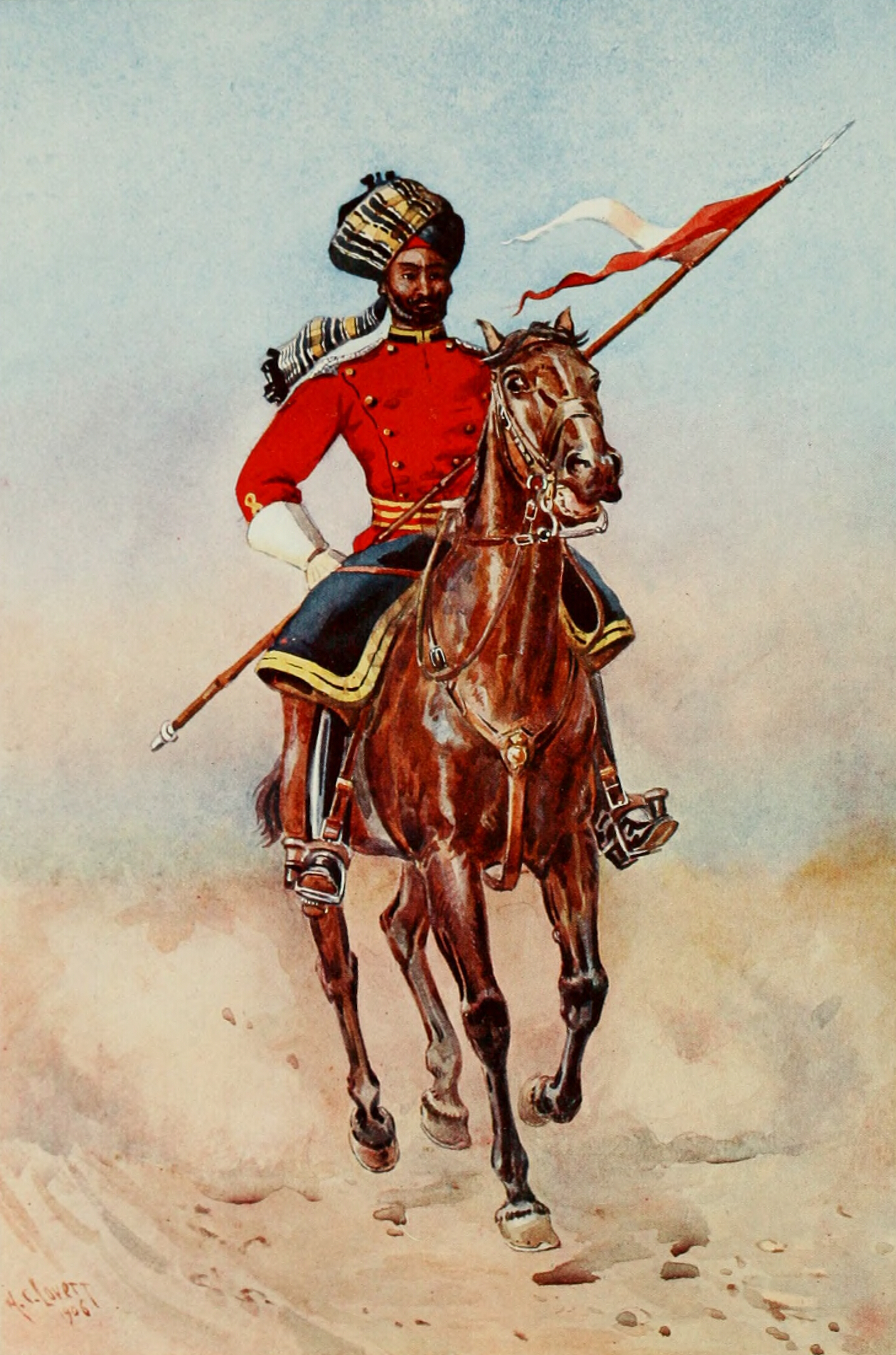
1910 illustration of a regimental sowar

The Presidency armies had no cavalry units until the early 1760s, when two troops of dragoons and one troop of hussars were raised - the latter becoming the personal bodyguard of the governor of Bengal. However, these units were disbanded during the reorganisation of the Presidency armies by Robert Clive following his return to India in 1765. By 1772, the Presidency armies once again had no cavalry units.

The first bodyguard regiment was raised in 1773 for Warren Hastings, the first Governor-General of India, as the Governor's Troop of Moghuls. across India. Hastings handpicked 50 troopers from the Moghal Horse, a unit which was raised in 1760 by local sirdars. In the same year, the Raja, Cheyt Singh of Benares provided another 50 troopers, that took the strength of the unit to 100. The first commander of the unit was Captain Sweeny Toone, an officer of the East India Company, who had Lieutenant Samuel Black as his subaltern.

The establishment of the unit was as follows:

- 1 Captain
- 1 Lieutenant
- 4 Sergeants
- 6 Daffadars
- 100 troopers
- 2 Trumpeters
- 1 Farrier

The Bodyguard was the only corps of cavalry in the Bengal Army until 1777 when two regiments of cavalry, raised in 1776, were transferred by the Asaf-ud-Daula, the Nawab of Awadh.

=== Company rule in India ===
The Governor General's Bodyguard first saw action in 1773–74, against the Sannyasi rebellion. Its next campaign during the First Rohilla War where in April 1774, the Rohillas were defeated completely at the Battle of St. George. The regiment was also during the 3rd Mysore War (1790–92) against Tipu Sultan where it successfully thwarted an assassination attempt on the life of Governor-General Cornwallis.

In 1801, a detachment consisting of one Native Officer and 26 other ranks went to Egypt to provide riders for an experimental unit of horse artillery to remove a French force that had invaded Egypt. It marched for 120-miles in the desert in the height of summer. All their horses died and they had to place the guns on camels. The Bodyguard detachment never saw action in Egypt, as Alexandria had capitulated by the time that they arrived there.

In 1811, the regiment earned its first Battle Honour 'Java' in 1811, during the invasion of Java. The successor President's Bodyguard unit has the unique distinction of being the only surviving unit to carry this honour. Java was not returned to the Kingdom of the Netherlands until 1816, after the conclusion of the Napoleonic Wars.

In 1824, a detachment volunteered to sail over the kaala paani ("black water", or open ocean, which Hindu soldiers once refrained from crossing, for fear of losing their caste) to take part in the First Anglo-Burmese War and earned their second Battle Honour "Ava".

The Bodyguard received their third Battle Honour "Maharajpore" for the Battle of Maharajpore (29 December 1843) during Gwalior campaign, when the British intervened against the Maratha Empire during the battle for the succession that erupted in Gwalior after the death of Maharaja Jankoji Rao Scindia II.

The regiment saw extensive service in the First Anglo-Sikh War in 1845 and won four Battle Honours, the most awarded to any regiment. It was involved in the first engagement of the conflict, the Battle of Mudki (Moodkee), where the regiment's commanding officer, Lieutenant Charles Digby Dawkins, was killed. The regiment took part in the subsequent battles of the war; at the Battle of Ferozeshah, the Battle of Aliwal, and the last battle of the war, the Battle of Sobraon.

The regiment was also active during the Indian Rebellion of 1857. Governor-General Canning asked the Indian officers and other ranks to serve without arms as a precautionary measure, which they did in good faith. With their loyalty established, the Bodyguard later escorted Canning to the grand durbar at Allahabad where he proclaimed that India would be governed by the British Crown, and the title of Viceroy was conferred on the Governor General on 1 November 1858.

=== British Raj ===
After the transfer of the rule of India from the East India Company to the British Crown through the Government of India Act 1858, the Governor General's Bodyguard was renamed to the Viceroy's Bodyguard. The subsequent recruitment and selection was from various elite regiments and units of the British Indian Army.

In 1885, the regiment participated in the Third Anglo-Burmese War. In 1893, William Riddell Birdwood became the Master Adjutant of the regiment, seeing service in a number of North-West Frontier expeditions, with his home (regimental) base in Dehradun.

During World War I, Viceroy and Governor-GeneralHardinge offered the Bodyguards as Divisional Cavalry for the Meerut Division, which was going to France, but it was decided that the best use of the unit was to serve as trainers for raw remounts of cavalry and artillery. Thus for the entire period of the war, the regiment worked as a remount training center. However, a detachment of the unit was sent to France as a reinforcement for the 3rd Skinner's Horse.

==== World War I and II ====
In the First World War, men of the regiment were deployed to the Middle East in the fight against the German-allied Ottoman Empire, seeing service in the Mesopotamian campaign.

The regiment was mechanised in 1944 while retaining its ceremonial mounted squadron. The regiment was re-roled as an airborne unit and joined the 44th Indian Airborne Division, and re-named the 44th Indian Airborne Division Reconnaissance Squadron (Governor General's Bodyguard) It would retain the name until sometime after the war, when it reverted to its former name. During World War II, for a brief period of time, the Viceroy's Body Guard served as 44th Division Reconnaissance Squadron.

==== Partition and independence of India ====
During the Partition of India, British Indian Army was divided 2:1 between the Dominions of India and Pakistan. Muslim personnel of the regiment were transferred to the Pakistan Army to form the Governor General's Bodyguard in Pakistan. The rest of the regiment, comprising the Sikhs, Jats and Rajputs remained with the Indian Army. The Viceroy's gold-plated buggy was coveted by both India and Pakistan. Its fate was decided by a coin toss between Colonel Thakur Govind Singh (India) and Sahabzada Yaqub Khan (Pakistan) and India won the buggy.

The regiment would be renamed the President's Bodyguard when India became a republic on 26 January 1950. In Pakistan, the successor regiment kept the title of Governor-General's Bodyguard until 1956 when Pakistan became a republic.

=== Strength and ethnic composition ===
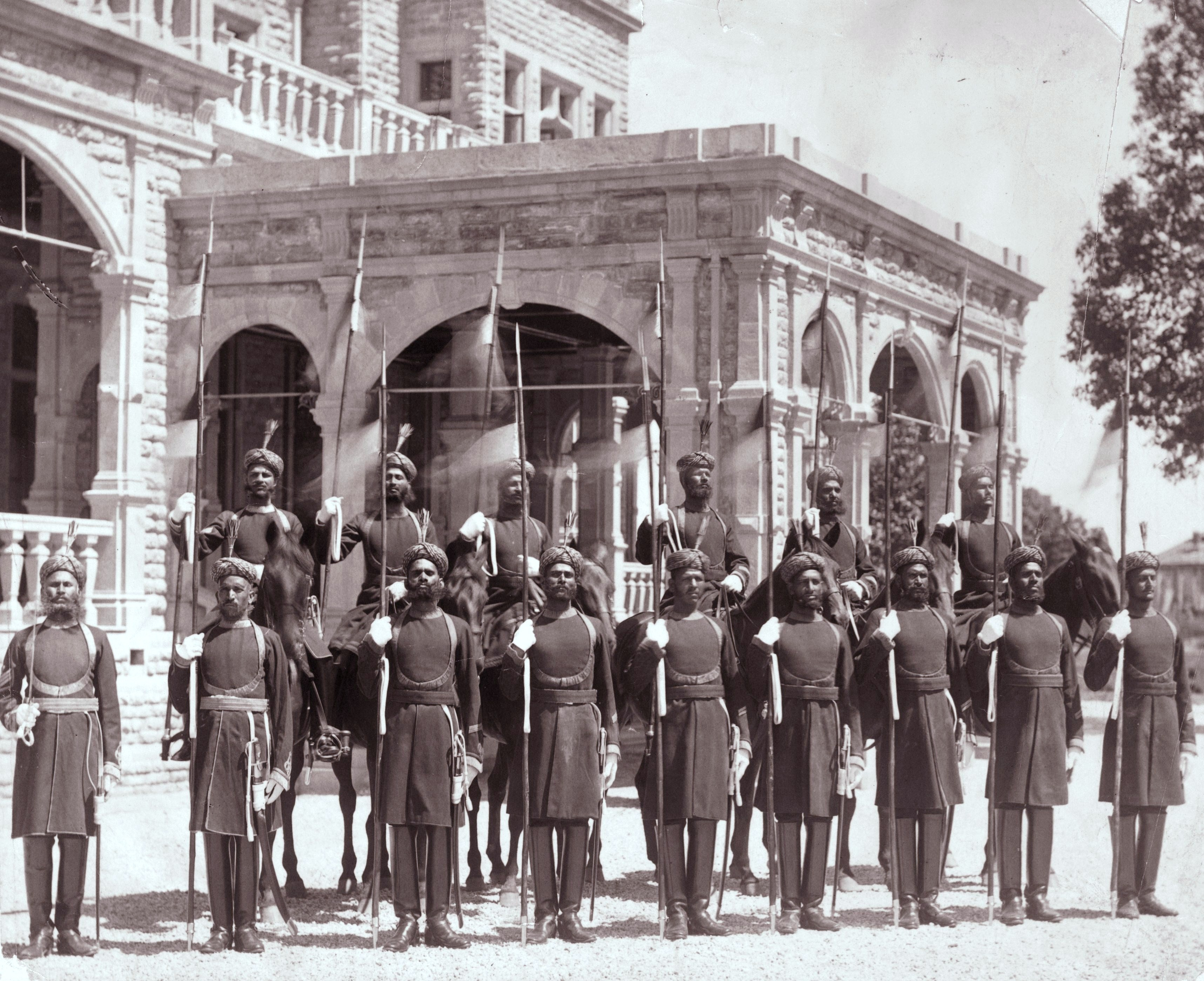
Soldiers of the Viceroy's Bodyguard, circa 1880.

The strength of this regiment has varied throughout its history. The minimum strength of the unit was 50 when it was raised in 1773, but the precise maximum strength of the unit is not known. The President of India's website claims a number of 1,929, just before the First Anglo-Sikh War but some historians believe the number to have been 469. According to the book "Historical Records of the Governor General's Body Guards", published in 1910, the maximum strength of the unit was 529 all ranks on 12 February 1844, just before the first Sikh War. In addition to 529 soldiers of all ranks, orders were also issued to attach two Rissalahs of Irregular Cavalry, taking the strength of the unit to 730 all ranks.

The ethnic composition of the unit varied equally. Recruitment started when the unit was raised in 1773 by Governor Warren Hastings, with a strength of 50 handpicked troopers. This nucleus of the Bodyguard was later augmented by another 50 horsemen, provided by Maharaja Chait Singh, thus bringing the overall strength of the regiment up to 100 horses and men by the end of that year.

By 1800, Hindus (Brahmins and Rajputs) were allowed to join the regiment along with Muslims, but the area of the recruitment remained the same Awadh and Bihar. In 1800, the recruitment pool was changed from the Bengal Presidency to the Madras Presidency and the regiment was reconstituted with troopers from the Madras cavalry for the next 60 years. During this period, South Indian castes comprised the bulk of this unit.

After the Indian Rebellion of 1857, the center of recruitment of the Indian Army was shifted from Awadh and southern India to northern India. Sikhs were allowed to enlist for the first time in Aug 1883 and Punjabi Muslims in October 1887. The recruitment of Brahmins ceased in 1895. After that, the proportions of recruits was fixed at 50% Sikhs (Malwa and Majha) and 50% Muslims (Hindustani and Punjabi).

=== Names ===
The name of the regiment has changed throughout its history:

Year	Name
1773	Governor's Troop of Moghuls
1784	Governor-General's Bodyguard
1858	Viceroy's Body Guard
1944	44th Divisional Reconnaissance Squadron
1947	Governor-General's Bodyguard
1950	President's Bodyguard

=== Uniform ===
Clothing regulations of 1913 were as below:

Uniform: red; facings blue.
Badges and Device:
On buttons —

- British officers.— burnished, with the Royal and Imperial Cypher in a Garter, bearing the motto of the Order of tho Garter, and a Tudor crown above.
- Indian officers.— Brass, with crossed lances; Tudor crown in upper angle, and "G. G. B. G." across the lower angle.

On field cap, — A Tudor crown in gold embroidery.
On forage cap. — Tudor crown surmounted by a lion, passant, regardant, in gold ombvoidery.
On pouch. — In gold embroidery the monogram "G. G. B. G." surmounted by a Tudor crown.
On pouch belt. — Gilt burnished, side prickers and chains.

=== Battle honours ===
The Governor-General's Bodyguard has the following battle honours:

- Java
- Ava
- Maharajpoor
- Moodkee
- Ferozeshah
- Aliwal
- Sobraon

all of which, except for "Java", are considered to be repugnant for the successor President's Bodyguard regiment and cannot be carried on regimental colours.

=== Standards, guidons & banners ===
The East India Company started issuing standards to Indian cavalry regiments in 1779. In 1800, the regiment was presented with its first standard by Governor-General Wellesley at the conclusion of his Review of the Body Guard. In 1815, the Governor-General Francis Rawdon-Hastings and his wife Flora presented a standard to the newly raised squadron. Two more Standards were presented to the newly raised squadrons of the Body Guards in 1844, when the strength of the regiment was highest. Standards were abolished in regiments of Indian Cavalry in 1864 and in 1931, a Guidon was presented to the Body Guards, which was last carried on escorts in 1936.

Two Silver state trumpets with banners were presented to the Bodyguard by the Viceroy and Governor-General Rufus Isaacs, 1st Marquess of Reading in 1923, on the 150th anniversary of the raising of the unit. One banner represented the Star of India with the battle honours of the regiment, and the other banner carried the coat-of-arms of the Governor-General of India. Each successive viceroy presented a banner to the Bodyguard upon assuming office; the banners of previous viceroys being kept in the custody of the regiment.

== Other bodyguard units ==
During the British Raj, each presidency had its own bodyguard unit, called the Governor's Body Guard. These units were disbanded in 1947.

=== Governor's Body Guard, Madras ===
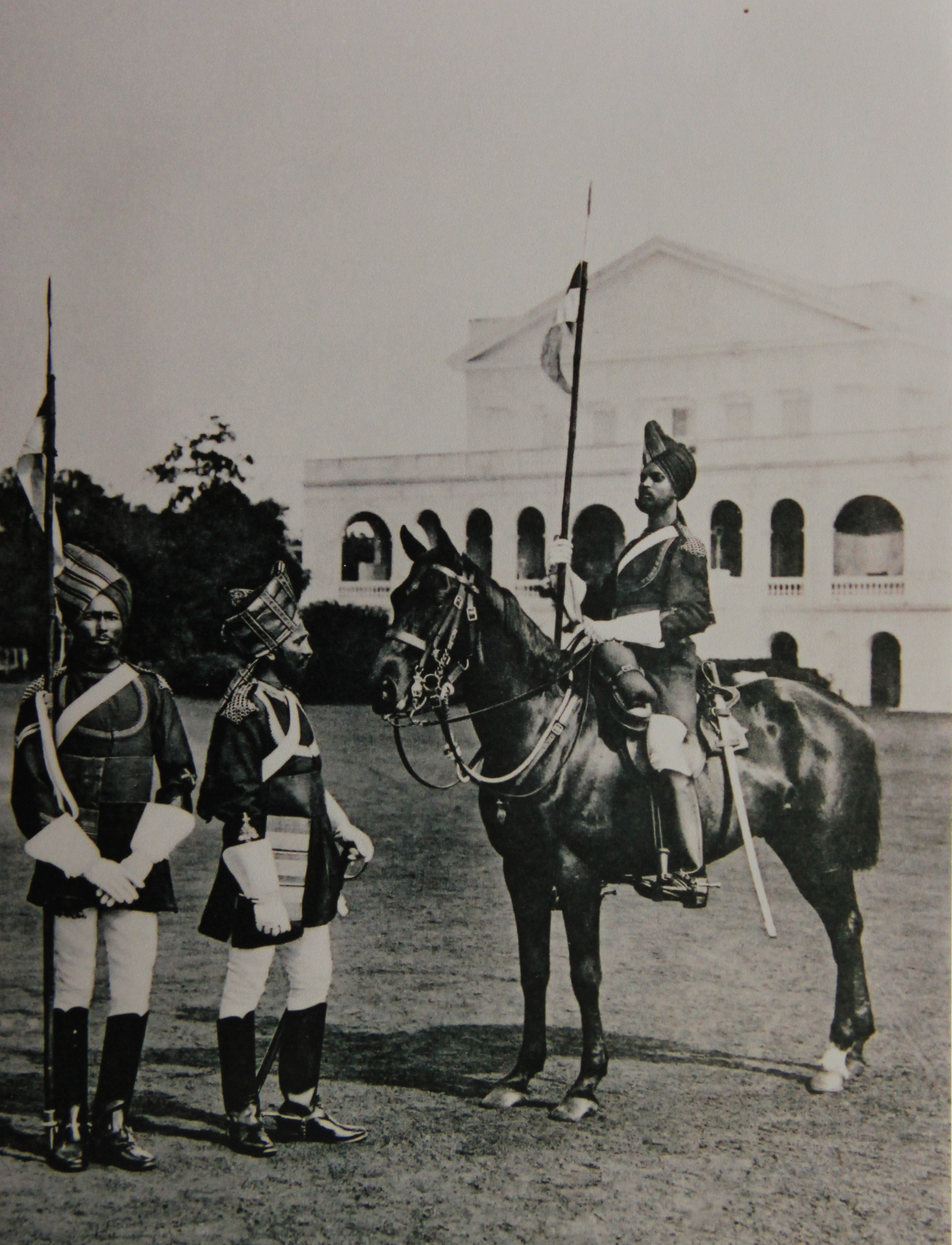
Governor's Body Guard, Madras

Governor's Body Guard, Madras was raised in 1778 in Madras and was the senior-most unit among the three Governor's Body Guard regiments. It was raised with one Sergeant, one Corporal and 12 European troopers, under command of Lieutenant. P. Sullivan. Unlike other Madras Army regiments, the Governor's Body Guard, Madras retained its name throughout its history till 1947, when it was disbanded.

The strength and composition of the unit, however, kept on changing. In 1778, it had one European troop and in 1781, the strength was raised to one European and one Native troop. The European troop was disbanded in 1784 and a company of the light infantry was attached. By 1799, strength of the regiment was raised to 100 men and it performed escort duty in Persia and Mysore war. From 1808 to 1820, detachments from different Madras cavalry regiments joined regiment on rotation.

The regiment took part in Third Anglo-Maratha War (1817–1819), where its charge along with 6th Bengal Light Cavalry changed the course of the war and it was considered as the decisive factor in winning the war. During the war, the regiment earned its only Battle Honour 'Seetabuldee' for the relief of Nagpur Residency. The regiment also took part in the First Anglo-Burmese War (1824–1826), where it rescued the advance guard which had been surrounded by a large body of enemy force at Pagan. During the First World War, the regiment served as a remount training center and also patrolled the beaches during the Bombardment of Madras by SMS Emden. A combined force was also formed from detachment from Bombay and Madras Body Guards and was sent to serve in France.

The Governor's Body Guards, Madras also received a standard from Viceroy and Governor-General Freeman Freeman-Thomas, 1st Marquess of Willingdon in March 1924 bearing its Battle Honour 'Seetabuldee'. At the time of its raising, the unit only had European troops. But 1781 onwards, South Indian classes dominated the regiment for most of the time, especially Deccani and Madrasi Muslims. In 1947, the unit had Rajputs from Rajasthan and Jats from Western United Provinces and Punjab.

=== Governor's Body Guard, Bombay ===
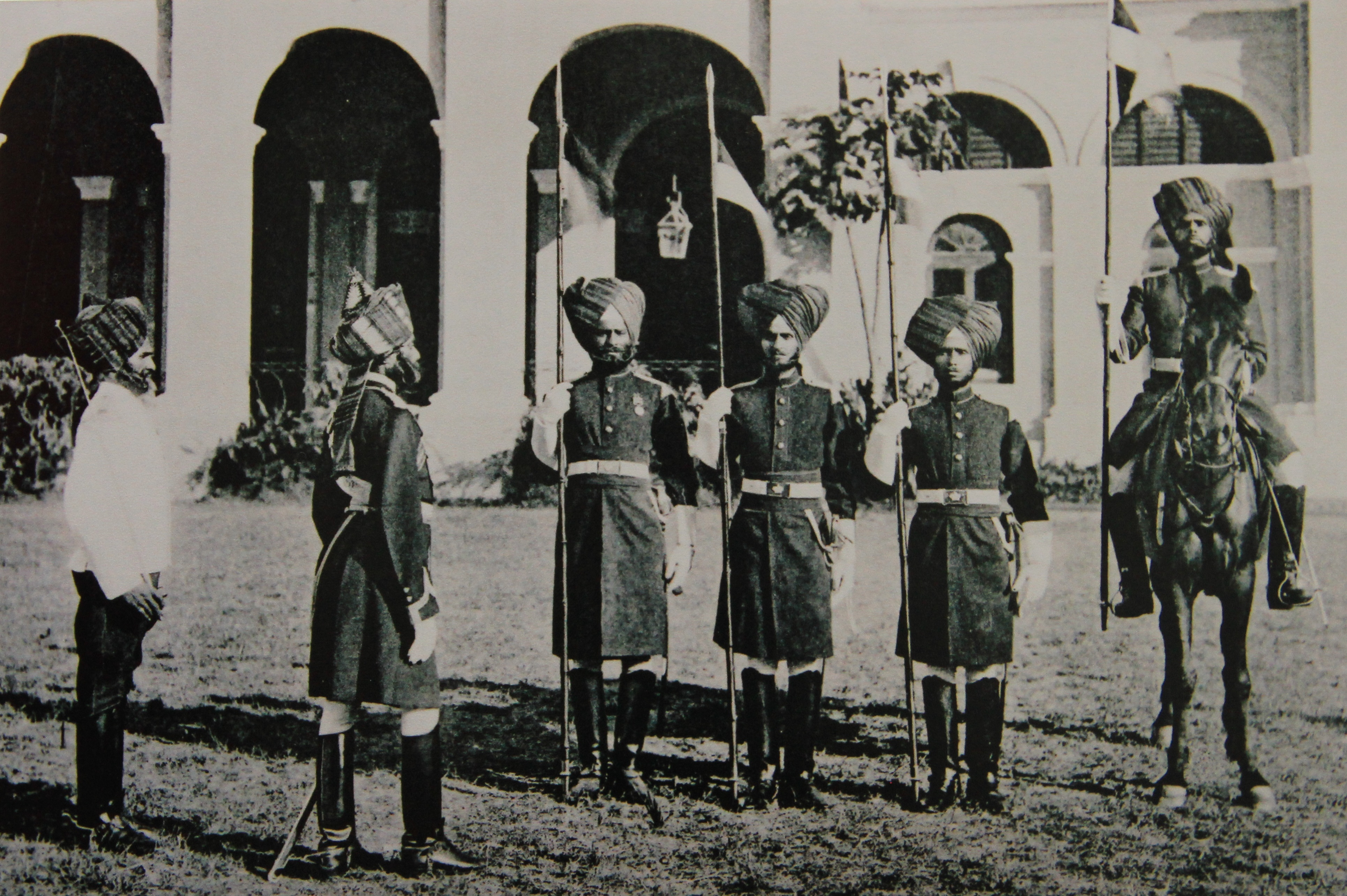
Governor's Body Guard, Bombay

The unit was raised on 22 March 1865 in Poona from a selected body of troopers of the disbanded Southern Mahratta Horse (SMH), which was first raised in 1850. Though the unit was re-organized twice in 1895 and 1938, there was no change in its title. It retained its title throughout its existence until 1947, when it was disbanded. In 1865, it had Mahratta troopers only from Southern Mahratta Horse; but later Sikhs, Deccani Muslims and Punjabi Muslims also served in the unit.

=== Governor's Body Guard, Bengal ===
In 1912, the capital of India was transferred from Calcutta to Delhi and the Viceroy, along with Governor General's Body Guard, moved to Delhi and Bengal got the status of the Presidency just like Bombay and Madras. At that time, Captain Rivers Berney Worgan of 20th Deccan Horse raised Governor's Body Guard, Bengal from volunteers from different Bengal cavalry regiments. This was the youngest unit among three Governor's Body Guard units. This regiment also retained its title throughout its existence and was also disbanded in 1947. Only Punjabi Muslims, Jats and Rajputs were recruited for the unit.

With respect to uniforms, all three Governor's Body Guard units followed the basic scarlet pattern with blue facings of the Governor General's Body Guards. There were however a number of distinctions such as cummerbunds and plastrons between the three bodyguards.

== Battle honours ==
- Java
- Ava
- Mahrajapore
- Moodkee
- Ferozeshah
- Aliwal
- Sobraon

== See also ==
- President's Bodyguard (India)
- President's Bodyguard (Pakistan)
- Household Cavalry
