= William Mayne (officer) =

19th century English East India Company army officer

William Mayne ADC
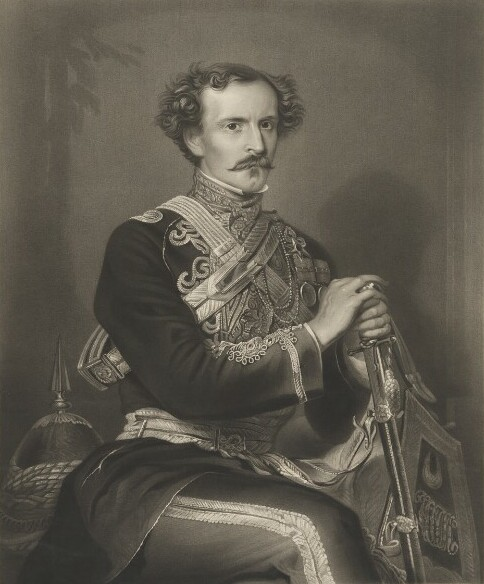
- William Mayne, mezzotint by George Salisbury Shury after a portrait by Karl Hartmann
- Born: 28 October 1818; Limpsfield, Surrey
- Died: 23 December 1855 (aged 37); Cairo, Egypt
- Military career
- Allegiance: East India Company
- Branch: Army of the Indus; Bengal Army
- Rank: Colonel
- Unit: 37th Bengal Infantry Regiment
- Commands: Hyderabad Contingent
- Conflicts: First Afghan War; Gwalior campaign Hyderabad conflicts

William Mayne, ADC (1818–1855) was an English army officer in the service of the East India Company who made his name in the defence of Jellalabad during the First Afghan War. He reached the rank of colonel in the Bengal Army, and served briefly as brigadier of the Hyderabad contingent.

== Life ==
William Mayne, born on 28 October 1818, was the second surviving son of the Rev. Robert Mayne of Limpsfield, Surrey, by his wife, Charlotte Cuninghame Graham, daughter of Colonel Graham of St. Lawrence House, near Canterbury. William Mayne, Baron Newhaven, was his father's brother. (Note: see Burke, Extinct Peerages, under "Mayne")

Mayne joined the East India Company's Military Seminary, Addiscombe, on 5 February 1836, and passed his examination on 12 June. Appointed ensign on 15 December 1837, he did duty with the 4th Bengal Native Infantry, and was afterwards posted to the 49th Bengal Native Infantry at Neemuch. On 29 November 1838 he was specially appointed to serve with the 37th Bengal Infantry in the Army of the Indus. Two companies of the 27th Bengal Infantry and ten of the 37th Bengal Infantry were attached to Sir Robert Sale's force. Mayne was appointed detachment-adjutant to these companies, and much distinguished himself at the unsuccessful attack on the fort of Julgar on 3 October 1840. He became lieutenant on 2 November 1841. As lieutenant in command of a rissalah (squadron) of the 2nd Shah Soojah's Irregular Cavalry, or Anderson's Horse, he repeatedly signalised himself during the defence, by Sir Robert Sale, of Jellalabad, and subsequently with the Quartermaster-General's department under General Pollock, and at the capture of Istalif on 29 September 1842. He was selected by Lord Ellenborough for the adjutancy of the body-guard, as "among the officers most distinguished in the late war". (Note: G. O. 20 December 1842.) While second in command of the bodyguard, he had a horse killed under him at Maharajpore on 31 December 1843. He was not engaged in the Sikh wars, being in command of the 5th Irregular Horse at Bhowapur during the first, and commandant of Lord Dalhousie's bodyguard at the time of the second war.

In 1851, while still a captain in the 37th Bengal Infantry, he was specially selected by Lord Dalhousie for the command of the Nizam's forces (Hyderabad Contingent), and at the head of six thousand of these troops was much employed in suppressing disturbances in the Deccan. The rapidity of Mayne's marches, and the invariable success of his operations, attracted general notice. He was repeatedly thanked by the Governor-General in Council, particularly for the defeat of a large body of Arabs near Aurungabad on 20 September 1853, and for his conduct on 22 September 1854. On the latter occasion, while investing the fort of Saila, near Hyderabad, he defeated and annihilated a party of Rohillas, who sallied out at dead of night, and attempted to cut their way through the besiegers.

Returning to England at the close of 1854, Mayne was made a brevet-colonel and ADC to the Queen. He had just returned to India when a violent attack of dysentery sent him home again. He died at Cairo on 23 December 1855. He married Helen Cunliffe, daughter of Thomas Reed Davidson, Bengal Civil Service, and niece of Lieutenant-general Sir Robert Cunliffe, by whom he left one child. (Note: The Gentleman's Magazine 1856, pt. i. p. 185.)
