= Urban ecotourism =

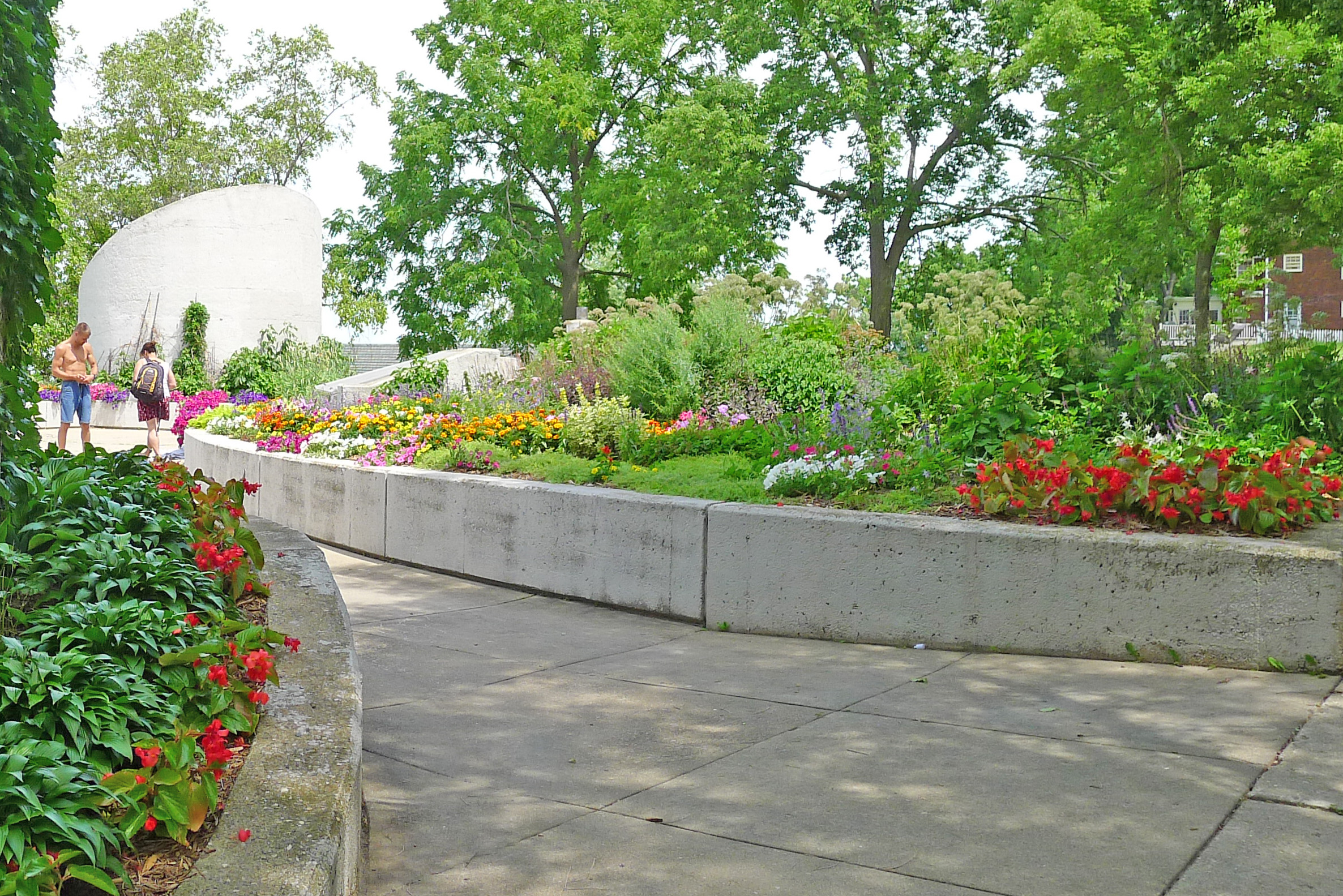
The James Madison Park shelter rooftop garden, located in Madison, Wisconsin. A project of neighborhood volunteers.

Urban ecotourism is a relatively new form of ecotourism that takes place in urban settings. The concept first appeared in 1996 when the Blackstone Corporation defined it as a form of environmental tourism that is more accessible to visitors. This type of tourism is done in urban areas to show the natural, cultural, and sustainable development that can give the urban areas economic and ecological health. Urban ecotourism shares the same goals for sustainability and community development as traditional ecotourism, but applies them to large cities, industrial wastelands, and post-productivist agriculture sites, as opposed to more nature-based venues for traditional ecotourism. Destinations in these locations may take the form of linear parks, farm-to-table restaurants, rewilding parks, biking and hiking trails, sustainable hotels, and rooftop gardens.

== Benefits of Urban Ecotourism ==
=== Environmental ===
Urban Ecotourism's basic concept of rehabilitation and naturalization of deteriorated land implies that environmental quality is improved at destination sites. The type and extent of change may depend on the context surrounding implementation. In nearly all observed applications of urban ecotourism, environmental benefits such as improved air quality, increased public education, and increased aesthetic beauty occur. Additionally, the travel to an urban green space allows for a functional restoration project of a city or area. These effects have been observed in a variety of venues, including industrial cities like Toronto and nature parks like Amager Nature Park in Denmark. In Toronto environmental impacts are reduced since the infrastructure required for a high volume of visitors is pre-existing, a more general audience can visit since cities are more easily accessible—invoking greater environmental education, and the heightened popularity of ecotourism can incentivize further sustainable development. Similarly, at Amager Nature Park benefits can be recognized as “the deliberate establishment of suitable habitats for [former] native species embedded in somewhat wilder eco-subsystems in different kinds of wastelands.” This sort of attraction can serve as a source of income for future conservation efforts as well as draw attention to environmental issues associated with development. While environmental costs exist, they are fewer relative to other conventional forms of tourism.

=== Economic and Social ===
The viability of ecotourism—as a conservation and development tool—is predicated on its potential to provide economic benefits. As infrastructure may already be developed, visitors may use the existing public transportation. Contrasting urban ecotourism with traditional ecotourism, urban applications may have better financial viability due to the opportunity for economies of scale along with a reduced likelihood of negative social impact. A case study of Drake Bay in Costa Rica found that where tourism occupies a major position in the local economy benefits are widespread, but equally is the case for adverse impacts. The negative effects reported in Drake Bay included increased solid waste generation, cultural loss, familial disintegration, increased access to drugs and alcohol, and lack of diversity in economic dependency. Though these consequences occurred due to scale in the small village of Drake Bay, they may be less likely to arise in metropolitan areas like Toronto since most cities in the developed world have efficient waste-management and enduring cultures that would not be largely altered by the industry of ecotourism. As the urban ecotourism industry grows in a given area, the local economy and culture may be better insulated from adverse effects and should accordingly be able to significantly increase economic and human development.

== Criticism ==
=== Environmental-Gentrification ===
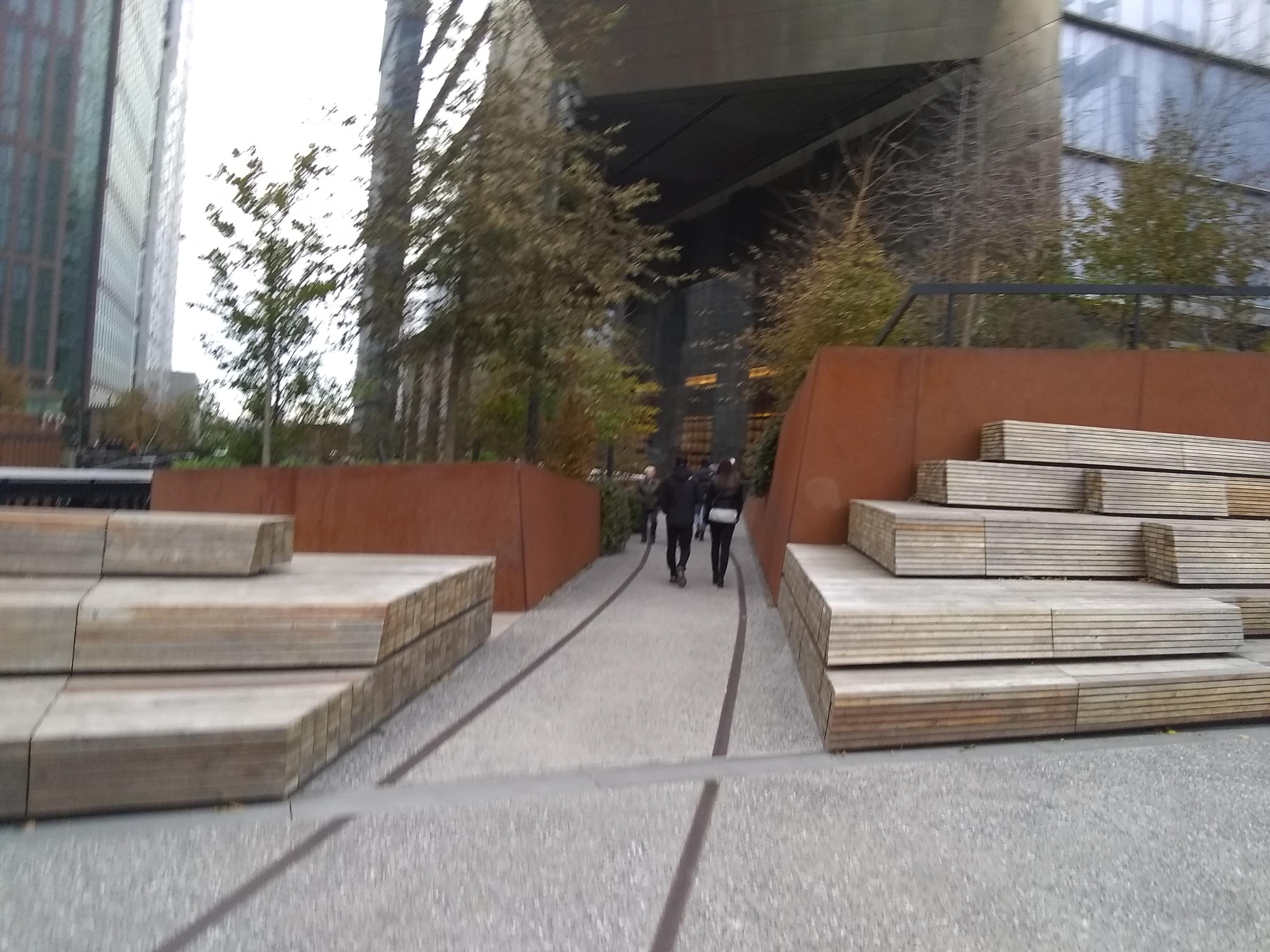
The High Line Park at 30th St. in Manhattan.

One side-effect of urban ecotourism is eco-gentrification in places with increased green-space amenities. Environmental gentrification is a process in which the improved quality of a local environment increases property values and attracts higher-income people while pushing out lower-income residents. The High Line is a noted example of eco-gentrification. The High Line is located in the historically low-income neighborhood of Chelsea in New York City and was previously an abandoned railway before it became an elevated green-space walkway. Studies have been conducted as to whether the introduction of the High Line raised property values and to whom this may have benefited most. Sales prices of properties within 800 meters of the High Line were analyzed, and it was found that properties located the closest–within 80 meters–increased in value by about 35%. This increase in property values points toward gentrification. Noting that many lower-income residents in the area are renters and wealthier residents are property owners, the increase in property values and subsequent 68% increase in median rent between 2009–2018 time period indicates that it may be more difficult for renters to remain in the area. In addition, the observance that major corporations, including Facebook, Google, and Salesforce, have since opened offices in Chelsea further signifies gentrification. This phenomenon is not unique to the High Line, but rather a characteristic of urban ecotourism spots as a whole under certain conditions. Though this does not confirm that all urban ecotourism causes eco-gentrification, it shows that there may be negative consequences for lower-income local people.

=== Sustainability Issues ===
Tourists may try to participate in sustainable tourism when visiting other areas, but don't realize the impact on the destinations' sustainability goals. There is little to no education to visitors about how to help achieve the goals of destinations' sustainability. Cities try to align and balance their infrastructure development with their tourism growth. A strategy practicing sustainability includes combining private business and public governance. This gets lost when considering personal visitor sustainability goals and the ultimate country or global sustainability goals. For example, the average increase of tourism around the globe being 4% disrupts the world goals due to the action of traveling by plane or ship.

== Destinations ==
=== The High Line ===
The High Line is a 1.45 mile long elevated linear park built on a former freight railway in the neighborhood of Chelsea in New York City. As of 2019, the park received about 8 million annual visitors, making it one of the most popular tourist attractions in the city and a global inspiration for similar transformations. In 1999 after decades of disuse, the structure was marked for demolition but community members took inspiration in the thriving wild plants on the structure and sought to preserve and rehabilitate the public space. Now, the High Line hosts more than 500 species of plants and is home to a diverse lineup of public programs, community and teen engagement, performances, and artwork, which is free and open to all.

=== Amager Nature Park ===
Amager Nature Park is an expansive wilderness park located within biking distance of the city of Copenhagen, Denmark. The area mainly consists of reclaimed land that was once used as a military training facility and landfill. The organization that manages the park claims that their goal is to make experiences in nature more accessible and attractive to people in the city. The park is one of the largest so close to a major city, amounting to about 3,000 acres—which is nearly ten times larger than Central Park in New York City—and encompasses a biodiverse array of landscapes and wildlife, including savannah, dense woods, salt-marshes, lakes, and canals which are home to numerous birds, deer, snakes, and frogs. Popular activities include hiking, horseback riding, camping, kite and wind-surfing, and bird watching.

=== Eco-Hotels ===
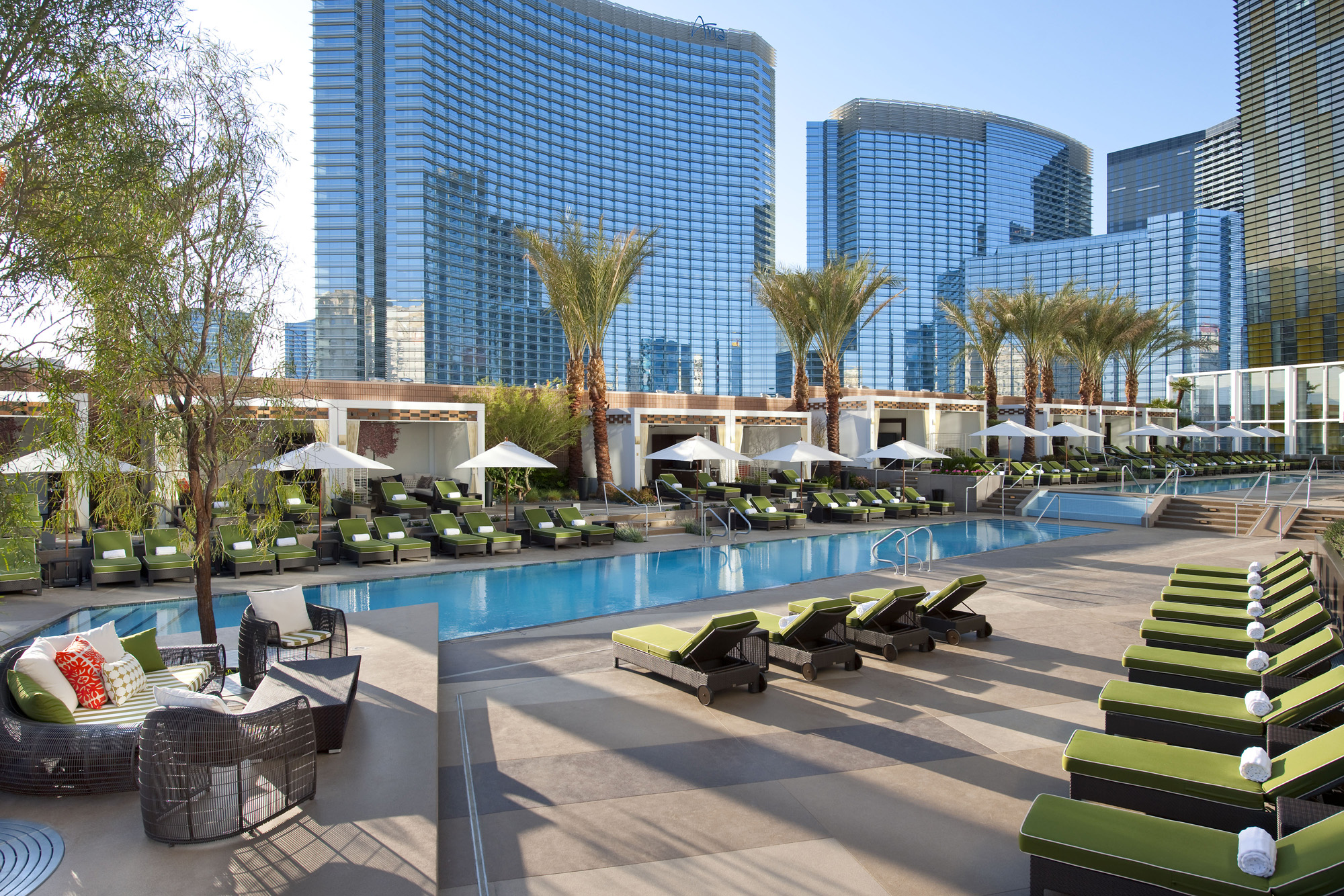
The Mandarin Oriental Hotel in Las Vegas. LEED certified Gold.

As the sustainable travel industry continues to grow, so has the accompanying market for environmentally conscious lodging. Many hotels have gained LEED certification, which is the most widely used metric for rating the sustainability of buildings in the world. In addition, many green hotel programs, labels, and standards, such as the Audubon International Green Lodging Program, Green Hotels Association, and Green Seal, have been created to better market and regulate hotels' efforts. The types of operations adopted by eco-hotels include comprehensive recycling programs, composting kitchen waste, towel and sheet-saver programs, energy saving lights, less hazardous cleaning products, farm-to-table organic cuisine, and guest education.

==== Ritz Carlton ====
As part of an environmental commitment, the Ritz Carlton in downtown Charlotte, North Carolina doubled the size of their rooftop garden and made all produce available to resident chefs and guests through the hotel restaurant and farmer's market. The garden enhancement project impacted all food and drink menus at the hotel by providing fresher ingredients with a smaller ecological footprint. In addition, the hotel provides eco-tours of the property's green practices and urban gardens to guests who are interested.

==== H2Hotel ====
The H2Hotel in Healdsburg, California is LEED NC 2.2 gold certified and incorporates a number of sustainable elements in its construction and guest accommodations. The site was formerly a gas station that was remediated and restored for the hotel. The architecture and features include a living roof covering 60% of the building, a rain water collection and filtration system, dual-flush toilets and low-flow faucets, and light colored pavement as well as a cool-roof system to reduce the urban heat island effect. The guest services also promote sustainable living through providing locally sourced seasonal ingredients on the menus, reusable water carafes in each room, and refillable bath amenities.

==== Novi-Sad ====
The city located in Serbia, is all developed on the riparian zone of the Dunube River, making it a highly urbanized ecotourist area. Along the river are small islands, some developed, where visitors can visit the oak woodlands. Additionally, the city has many parks and protected monuments that belong as the natural landscape like Dunavski park, Futoški park, and Limanski park. The city has "Novi Sad Spring" which is an event containing lectures and expert panels about florals of the season and area.

== The Future of Urban Ecotourism ==
Some cities and municipalities have adopted urban ecotourism as a development option, citing resource use and pollution associated with urbanisation and concerns about climate change. The topic has received little academic research, and few case studies of real-life implementation have been published. Ecotourism has been described as the fastest-growing sector of the travel industry, and urban ecotourism is expected to grow as well. This should lead to a stronger understanding of the intentional and carryover effects of this emerging industry. Visitors base their destination on a welcoming environment with easy access excursions and attractions. Aligning the interests of tourists will give cities profit to build and expand their infrastructure and services.
