= Govind Singh (academic) =

Indian academic & environmentalist

Govind Singh (born 10 June 1984) is an academic and environmental activist based in Delhi. Singh is associated with the Jindal School of Environment & Sustainability at O. P. Jindal Global University as associate professor. He is also the Co-Founder and Director of Delhi Greens NGO and also leads the Urban Ecology - Research & Action Lab. Prior to his association with O. P. Jindal Global University, Singh was associated with Delhi School of Journalism, Indraprastha College for Women and Cluster Innovation Centre, University of Delhi in the capacity of Assistant Professor of Environmental Studies & Management.

Singh's primary contribution has been in the area of strengthening the environmental movement in Delhi and India, particularly among the youth. His views on environment focus on the principles of Deep Ecology while simultaneously trying to create a balance between development and environmental protection. His two significant contributions to environmental protection are the Delhi Greens Blog and the concept of Urban Ecotourism. The Delhi Greens Blog won the Indian Bloggers Award 2013 under the Social/Environment Blog Category and was subsequently indexed as a Momentum for Change, Lighthouse Activity by the United Nations Framework Convention on Climate Change. In 2016, Govind Singh became the Editor-in-Chief of the Journal of Innovation for Inclusive Development (JIID) published from IP College.
