= Rivers Berney Worgan =

British general (1881–1934)

- Portrait by Walter Stoneman, 1922
- Born: 4 March 1881; Arrah, British India
- Died: 6 February 1934 (aged 52); London, England
- Military career
- Allegiance: United Kingdom
- Branch: British Indian Army
- Service years: 1900–1930
- Rank: Brigadier General
- Units: 20th Deccan Horse, Honourable Corps of Gentlemen at Arms
- Conflicts: Second Boer War; World War I; Third Anglo-Afghan War; North-West Frontier; First Waziristan Campaign
- Awards: CSI, CVO, DSO

Brigadier General Rivers Berney Worgan CSI CVO DSO (4 March 1881 – 6 February 1934) was a senior British Indian Army officer during the First World War and Military Secretary to the Viceroy of India.

== Biography ==
Born in Arrah on 4 March 1881, Worgan was educated at Bedford School and at the Royal Military College, Sandhurst. He entered the British Army as a second lieutenant in the Army Service Corps on 21 February 1900, and served during the Second Boer War.

He transferred to the British Indian Army and joined 20th Deccan Horse in 1905. He was appointed as Aide-de-camp to Arthur Lawley, 6th Baron Wenlock, Governor of Madras, in 1907, and commanded the Bodyguard of the Governor of Madras, between 1910 and 1912. Under orders from Thomas Gibson-Carmichael, 1st Baron Carmichael, he raised and commanded the Bodyguard of the 1st Governor of Bengal, between 1912 and 1913.

He served during the First World War, commanding the 9th Battalion, the Cheshire Regiment (1916–17), and the 173rd Brigade, 58th (2/1st London) Division, at the Second Battle of the Somme (1918). Subsequently, he served during the Third Anglo-Afghan War (1919) and the Waziristan Campaign (1919–20).

He was Military Secretary to Prince Arthur, Duke of Connaught and Strathearn during his tour of India, between 1920 and 1921, Military Secretary to the Prince of Wales during his tour of India, between 1921 and 1922, and Military Secretary to the Viceroy of India, between 1923 and 1926. He was Commander of the Southern Brigade Area, between 1926 and 1930, retired from the British Indian Army in 1930, and was appointed as a Member of the Honourable Corps of Gentlemen at Arms in 1932.

Brigadier General Rivers Berney Worgan was invested as a Companion of the Distinguished Service Order (DSO) in 1917, as a Commander of the Royal Victorian Order (CVO) in 1921 and as a Companion of the Order of the Star of India (CSI) in 1922. He died in London on 6 February 1934, aged 52.
