= Rathore (surname) =

Rathore is a surname of Indian origin.

== Notable people ==
- Adarsh Rathore, Indian journalist
- Aditi Rathore, Indian actress
- Amar Singh Rathore, nobleman of Marwar Kingdom in India
- Bal Krishen Rathore, Emirati businessman
- Biram Singh Rathore of Marwar, ruler of Marwar Kingdom in India
- Chandrasen Rathore, ruler of Marwar Kingdom in India
- Darshna Rathore, Indian sport shooter
- Durgadas Rathore, warrior of Marwar Kingdom in India
- Fateh Singh Rathore, Indian conservationist
- Ganga Rathore of Marwar, ruler of Marwar Kingdom in India
- Hanuman Singh Rathore, Indian basketball player
- Hanut Singh Rathore, Indian soldier
- Hariom Singh Rathore, Indian politician
- Jaimal Rathore, ruler of Merta in India
- Jayendra Pratap Singh Rathore, Indian politician
- Kanji Morarji Rathore, Indian industralist
- Karni Singh Rathore, Indian soldier
- Kishan Singh Rathore, Indian soldier
- Kishore Singh Rathore, Nepali politician
- Kuldeep Singh Rathore, Indian politician
- Kunal Singh Rathore, Indian cricketer
- Laxman Singh Rathore, Indian scientist
- Madan Rathore, Indian politician
- Maldev Rathore, ruler of Marwar Kingdom in India
- Mohan Singh Rathore, Indian politician
- Mohar Singh Rathore, Indian social worker
- Nagendra Singh Rathore, Indian politician
- Nathu Singh Rathore, Indian soldier
- Nitendra Singh Rathore, Indian politician
- Phool Bai Rathore, wife of Maharana Pratap of Mewar
- Prem Singh Rathore, Indian politician
- R. S. Rathore, Indian cricket umpire
- Raghavendra Rathore, Indian fashion designer
- Raghuvendra Singh Rathore, Indian judge
- Rajendra Rathore (chemist), Indian chemist
- Rajendra Singh Rathore, Indian politician
- Rajiv Rathore, Indian cricketer
- Rajiv Rathore (cricketer, born 1968), Indian cricketer
- Rajyavardhan Singh Rathore, Indian politician
- Ravi Rathore, Indian polo player and army officer
- Ratan Singh Rathore, ruler of Ratlam.
- Reshma Rathore, Indian actress
- Richa Rathore, Indian actress
- Rodmal Rathore, Indian politician
- S. S. Rathore, Indian civil engineer
- Satal Rathore of Marwar, ruler of Marwar Kingdom in India
- Satyapal Singh Rathore, Indian politician
- Shweta Rathore, Indian athlete
- Suja Rathore of Marwar, ruler of Marwar Kingdom in India
- Sultan Singh Rathore, Indian police officer
- Surendra Singh Rathore, Indian politician
- Vikram Rathore, Indian cricket coach

== See also ==
- Rathod (surname)
