= R. S. Sodhi =

Indian Army officer and polo player

Colonel R. S. Sodhi
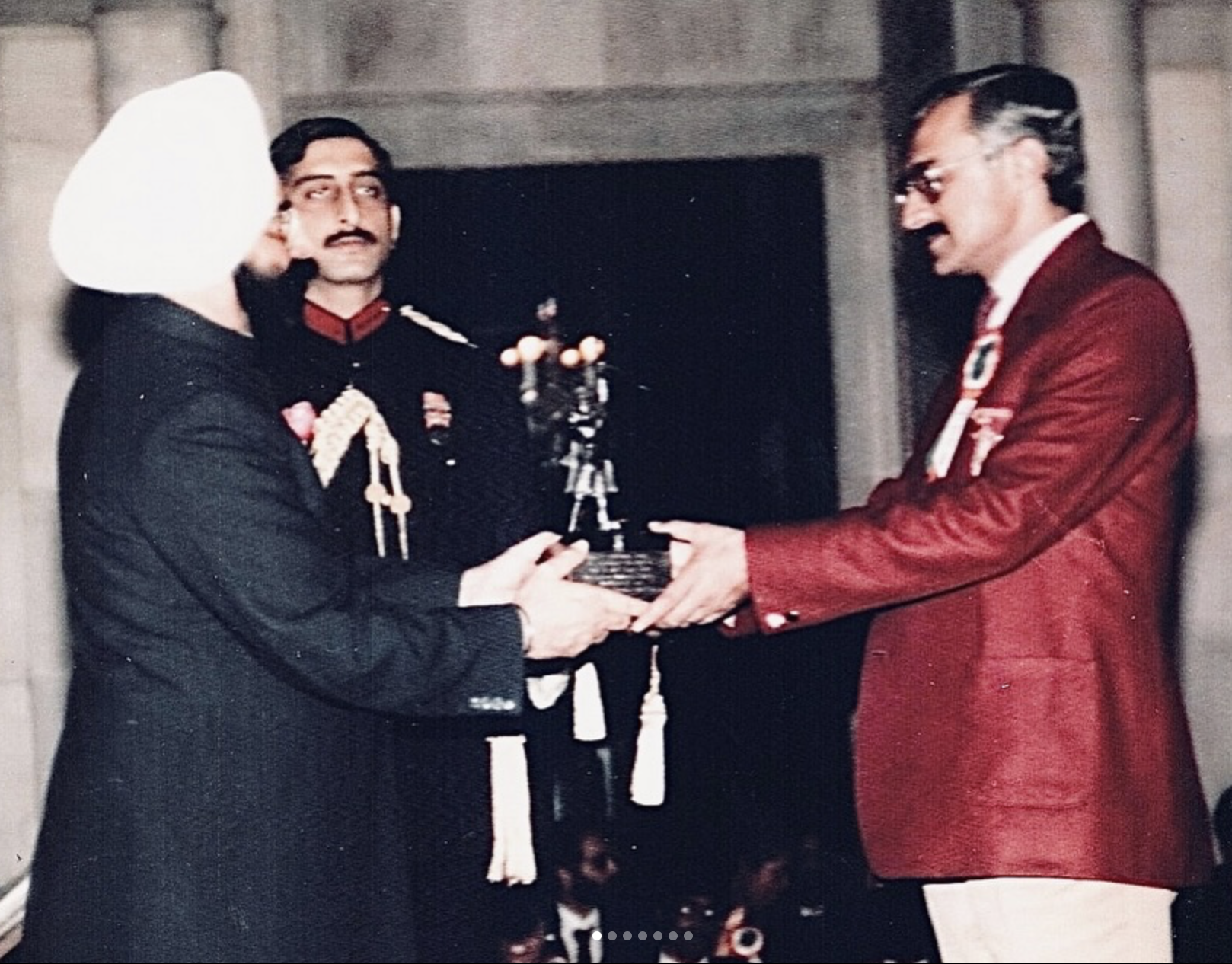
- Col. R. S. Sodhi receiving the Arjuna Award from President Zail Singh
- Born: Ravinder Singh Sodhi c. 1940s Rawalpindi, British India (now Pakistan)
- Spouse: Nafisa Ali
- Military career
- Allegiance: India
- Branch: (India) Indian Army
- Service years: 1960s–1990s
- Rank: Colonel
- Nickname: Pickles
- Unit: 61st Cavalry (India)
- Commands: 61st Cavalry (India)
- Awards: Arjuna Award (1983)

Colonel Ravinder Singh "Pickles" Sodhi (born c. 1940s) is a retired officer of the Indian Army and a former Indian polo player. He served in the 61st Cavalry and was among India’s leading polo players during the 1970s and 1980s. In 1983, he received the Arjuna Award for his achievements in polo, making him one of the rare sibling pairs — with his elder brother Colonel H. S. "Billy" Sodhi — to both receive India’s top sporting honour.

== Early life and education ==
Sodhi was born in Rawalpindi into a cavalry family; his father, Brigadier Ajit Singh, owned a farm where Ravinder and his elder brother Harinder “Billy” Sodhi learned to ride. After Partition the family relocated to India. Like his brother, Sodhi attended the Lawrence School, Sanawar, known for its equestrian tradition, before joining the National Defence Academy where he pursued polo competitively.

== Military career ==
Sodhi was commissioned into the 61st Cavalry in the late 1960s. He rose to the rank of Colonel, combining regimental duties with competitive polo and mentoring younger Army riders. His career exemplified the 61st Cavalry’s dual role of ceremonial function and equestrian sport.

== Polo and equestrian career ==
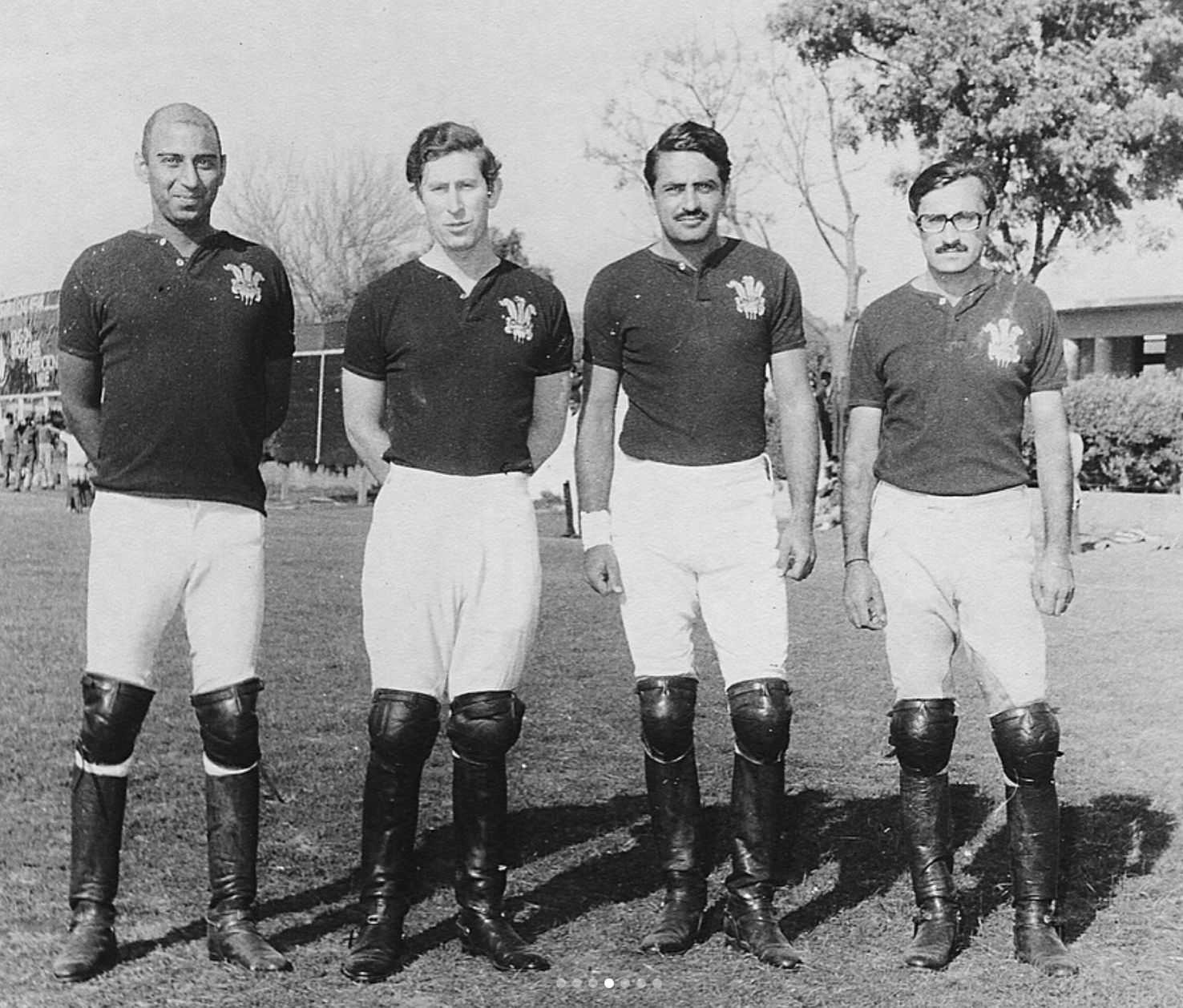
Commonwealth Polo - Brig. V. P. Singh & HRH Prince Charles with Col. R. S. Sodhi (Pickles)

Sodhi emerged as one of India’s leading polo players of the 1970s and 1980s.

- He frequently played alongside his brother H. S. “Billy” Sodhi and other stalwarts such as Rao Raja Hanut Singh and the Jaipur royal family players.
- Represented India in international tournaments including in the United Kingdom, Argentina, and the Middle East.
- Competed regularly in the Indian Polo Association Gold Cup, Jaipur Cup, and other major domestic tournaments, winning several national titles.
- Maintained a peak handicap of +4 goals during his career.
- Won a record 17 consecutive Indian Open Championships.

In recognition of his achievements, Sodhi was awarded the Arjuna Award in 1983.

== Family ==
Sodhi is married to Nafisa Ali, a former national swimming champion, actress, and social activist. They have three children.

The Sodhi family is one of India’s most decorated sporting lineages:

- Elder brother Brig. H. S. "Billy" Sodhi – Arjuna Award (1976, polo/equestrian).
- Nephew Mansher Singh – Arjuna Award (trap shooting), Olympic shooter.
- Nephew Adhiraj Singh – Arjuna Award (equestrian).

== Later life and legacy ==
After retiring from the Army, Col. R. S. Sodhi remained involved in polo as a player, mentor, and adviser. He has been associated with the Delhi Polo Club and the Indian Polo Association. Alongside his wife, he remains active in Delhi’s cultural and sporting circles.

Brigadier HH Sawai Bhawani Singh with Lokendra Singh Ghanerao, Colonel H. S. (Billy) Sodhi, Colonel R. S. (Pickles) Sodhi and Colonel Bhawani Singh

Sodhi is remembered for sustaining Indian polo in the decades after Independence, working alongside contemporaries like Brig. V. P. Singh, Col. H. S. Sodhi, Col. Bhawani Singh, Col. Kuldeep Singh Garcha and Rao Raja Hanut Singh.

== Awards and recognition ==
- Arjuna Award (1983) – Polo.
- Multiple domestic titles including the Indian Polo Association Gold Cup and Jaipur Cup.

== See also ==
- 61st Cavalry (India)
- H. S. Sodhi
- Polo in India
