= R. S. Brar =

Indian Army officer and equestrian (polo & tent pegging)

Colonel R. S. Brar
- Born: Rupinder Singh Brar c. 1940s Punjab, British India
- Military career
- Allegiance: India
- Branch: (India) Indian Army
- Service years: 1960s–1990s
- Rank: Colonel
- Nickname: Rupi
- Unit: 61st Cavalry
- Commands: 61st Cavalry
- Awards: Arjuna Award

R. S. Brar
Sport
- Country: India
- Sport: Equestrian (Tent Pegging, Polo)
- Events: Individual Tent Pegging, Polo
Medal record
| Gold medal – first place | 1982 Asian Games | Individual Tent Pegging |

Colonel Rupinder Singh "R. S." Brar (born c. 1940s) (sometimes known as Col R.S. “Rupi” Brar) is a retired officer of the Indian Army and a decorated Indian equestrian. He served in the 61st Cavalry, one of the world’s last remaining horse-mounted cavalry regiments, and rose to become its Commandant. Brar was a leading polo player for India, captaining the national polo team and achieving a handicap of +5, Brar also won the gold medal in individual tent pegging at the 1982 Asian Games in New Delhi. Brar was honoured with the Arjuna Award for his contributions to equestrian in 1982.

== Early life and education ==
Brar was born in Punjab into a family with a long polo and equestrian tradition. His great-grandfather had been a polo player who kept more than a hundred ponies. He received his schooling at The Lawrence School, Sanawar. Brar attended the National Defence Academy in 1961, where he trained for a career in the Army and began pursuing polo at a competitive level.

== Military career ==
Brar was commissioned into the Indian Army in the mid-1960s and later transferred to the 61st Cavalry. Within the regiment, he emerged as one of the unit’s strongest polo players and equestrians, eventually becoming the regiment’s Commandant. Brar has also been vocal in defending the cavalry tradition: in 2020 he publicly opposed proposals to convert the 61st Cavalry into a mechanised unit, arguing that the regiment’s heritage and contribution to equestrian sport should be preserved.

== Equestrian career ==
Brar represented India in multiple equestrian disciplines, including tent pegging and polo.

- At the 1982 Asian Games in New Delhi he won the gold medal in individual tent pegging, the only time the discipline has been included in the Games.
- In polo, he achieved a handicap of +5, held for more than 15 years and was captain of the strongest 61st Cavalry team in the modern era, comprising Col. Kuldeep Singh Garcha, Capt. Bhawani Singh and Major M. S. Sekhon that won every major Indian Trophy in the 1980s.
- He captained the Indian national polo team and competed internationally in the United Kingdom, Argentina, Mexico, France and South Africa.
- Domestically, he competed in and won major tournaments such as the Indian Polo Association Gold Cup and President’s Cup, representing the Army and the 61st Cavalry.

== Awards and honours ==
- Gold Medal – Individual Tent Pegging, 1982 Asian Games (New Delhi).
- Arjuna Award 1982 - Equestrian
- Numerous domestic polo trophies and recognition as one of India’s leading high-goal players.

== Later life and legacy ==
Brar retired from the Army with the rank of Colonel in the 1990s. He remained associated with polo clubs and equestrian institutions, mentoring young riders and advising schools such as The Punjab Public School, Nabha, in reviving horse-riding programmes. He is remembered for sustaining India’s equestrian visibility during the 1980s and 1990s and for his gold medal achievement at the 1982 Asian Games, a landmark in Indian tent pegging. His leadership of the 61st Cavalry further cemented the regiment’s role as a hub of Indian equestrian sport. Brar has also been associated with the Indian Polo Association and the Equestrian Federation of India in advisory capacities, leveraging his experience to develop the next generation of riders.
