= H. S. Sodhi =

Colonel H. S. Sodhi, VSM
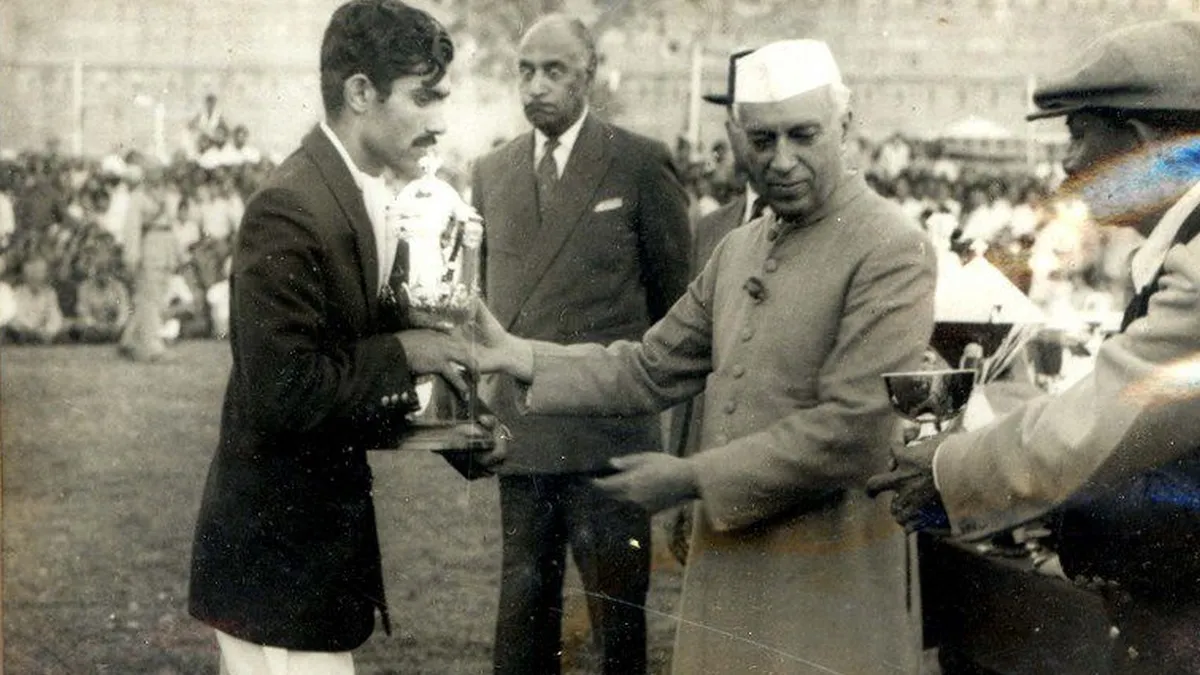
- Col. HS Sodhi with the Indian Prime Minister, Pandit Jawaharlal Nehru
- Born: Harinder Singh Sodhi c. 1938; Rawalpindi, British India (now in Pakistan)
- Died: 9 November 2024 (aged 86); New Delhi, India
- Military career
- Allegiance: India
- Branch: (India) Indian Army
- Service years: 1950s–1980s
- Rank: Colonel
- Nickname: Billy
- Units: 61st Cavalry (India); President's Bodyguard (India)
- Commands: 61st Cavalry; President’s Bodyguard
- Awards: Arjuna Award (1976); Vishisht Seva Medal

Colonel Harinder Singh "Billy" Sodhi, VSM (c. 1938 – 9 November 2024) was an Indian Army officer and one of India’s leading polo and equestrian sportspersons of the post-Independence era. He served in and later commanded the 61st Cavalry and the President’s Bodyguard and achieved a peak polo handicap of +5. He received the Arjuna Award in 1976 for equestrian sport, and later remained an influential advocate of India’s cavalry and equestrian traditions.

== Early life and education ==
Sodhi was born in Rawalpindi into a family closely associated with horses; his father, Brigadier Ajit Singh, owned a farm where Sodhi and his younger brother, Ravinder Singh “Pickles” Sodhi, learned to ride. After Partition the family resettled in India. Both brothers attended the Lawrence School, Sanawar, noted for its equestrian tradition, and later trained at the National Defence Academy (NDA).

== Military career ==
Sodhi was commissioned into the 61st Cavalry, India’s mounted cavalry regiment, where he combined military service with equestrian competition. He later held leadership roles in both the 61st Cavalry and the President’s Bodyguard, ultimately serving as Commandant of the latter. As a mentor within the Army’s riding ecosystem he helped sustain competitive equestrian sport; among those he encouraged were riders who later became Arjuna awardees.

In May 2022, Prime Minister Narendra Modi wrote to Colonel (retd.) H. S. Sodhi lauding the service of cavalry horses, a correspondence that drew national attention to Sodhi’s role as a custodian of equestrian traditions.

== Polo and equestrian career ==
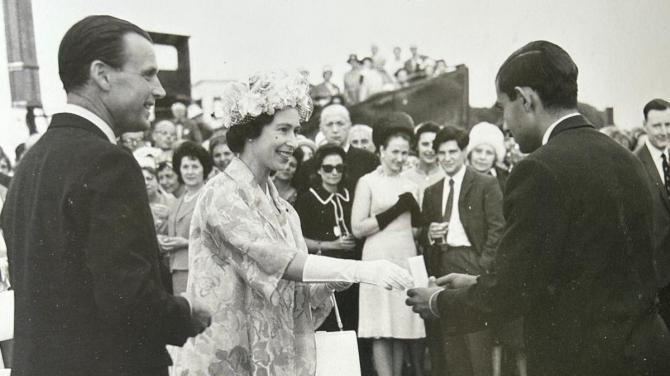
Col, H. S. Sodhi with HRH Queen Elizabeth II

Sodhi combined Army service with an elite polo career, reaching a handicap of +5 at his peak. Known popularly as “Billy”, he played alongside stalwarts such as Rao Raja Hanut Singh, Maharaj Prem Singh, Kishen Singh and Sawai Man Singh II and later with Bhawani Singh of Jaipur.

Beyond polo, Sodhi was active across equestrian disciplines including show jumping, dressage and eventing, and contributed to the organisation of horse shows in Delhi. He was associated with India’s first Olympic equestrian effort in 1980, serving as manager of the equestrian team for the Moscow Olympics.

== Awards and honours ==
- Arjuna Award (1976) – Equestrian.
- Peak polo handicap: +5 (1970s–80s).

Related: Sodhi’s younger brother Ravinder Singh "Pickles" Sodhi received the Arjuna Award in 1983 (polo).

== Personal life ==
Sodhi married Roshan Kumaramangalam, daughter of General P. P. Kumaramangalam, and the couple were active in Delhi’s equestrian scene. Their elder daughter, Anesha Sodhi, became a national show-jumping champion and later served as a judge and selector. His extended family includes sports awardees and public figures; his sister-in-law is Nafisa Ali.

== Death ==
Sodhi died in New Delhi on 9 November 2024 at the age of 86. He is survived by his wife and two daughters.

== Legacy ==
Sodhi is remembered within the Army and Indian polo for sustaining cavalry sport after the decline of princely patronage and for mentoring subsequent generations of riders. His correspondence with the Prime Minister over cavalry horses underscored his role as a public advocate for equestrian heritage.

== See also ==
- Polo in India
