= Polo in India =

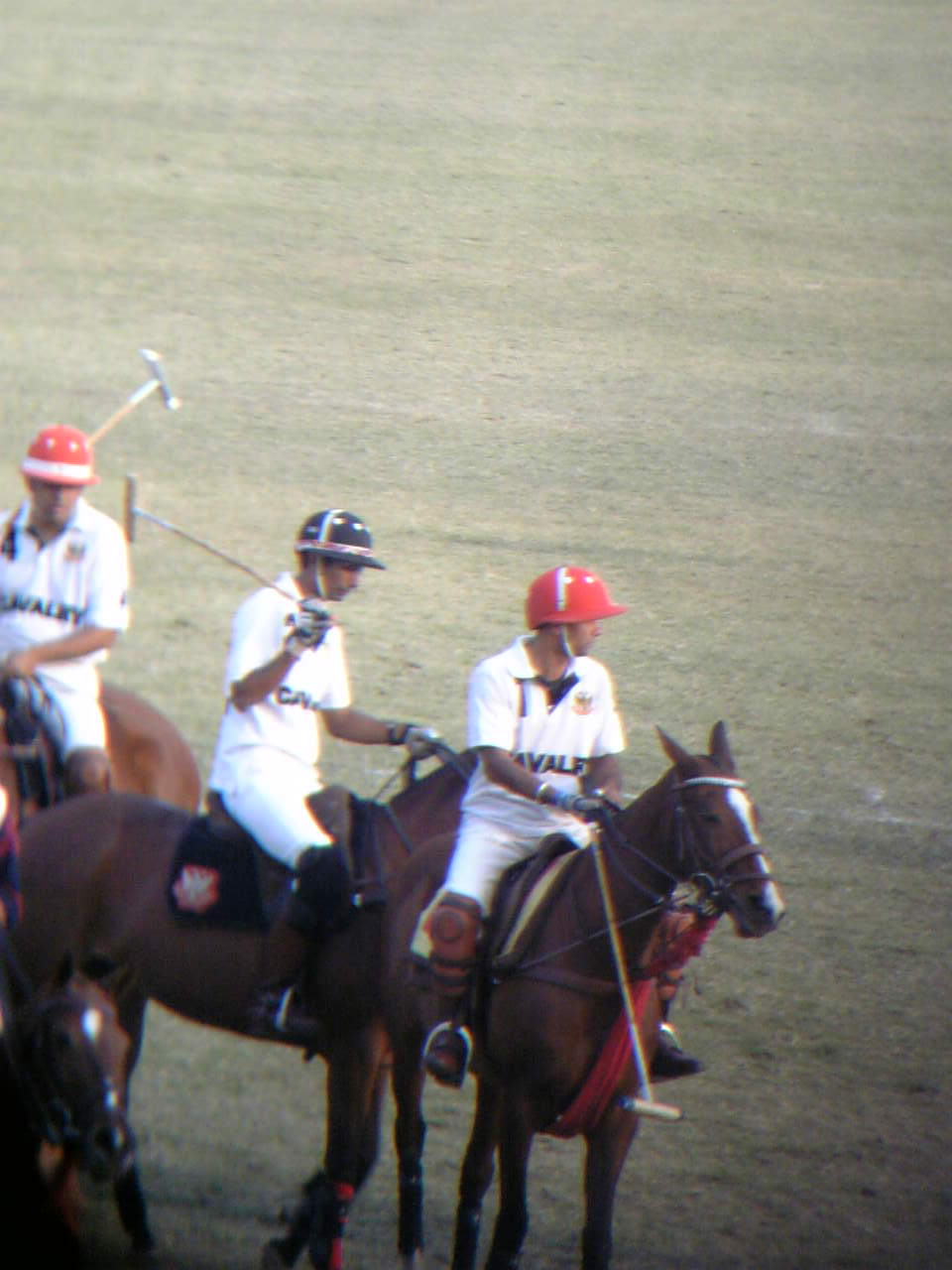
- Polo in Jaipur.
- Country: India
- Governing body: Indian Polo Association
- National team(s): India
- First played: 1860s
- Clubs: 35

International competitions
- World Polo Championship

India is the birthplace of modern polo. The modern game of polo is derived from Manipur, where the game was known as sagol kangjei, kanjai-bazee, or pulu. It was the anglicised form of the last, referring to the wooden ball that was used, which was adopted by the sport in its slow spread to the west.

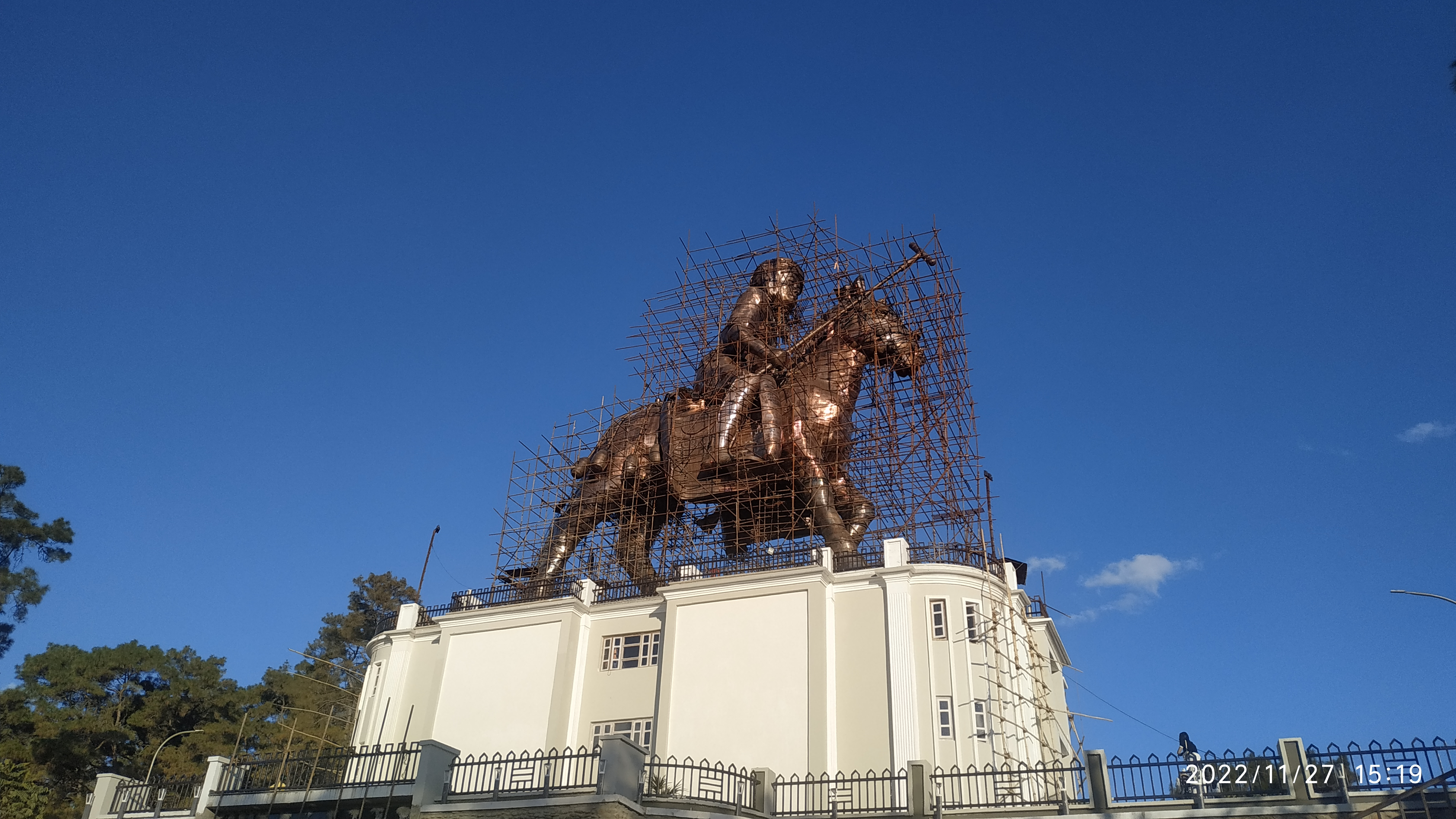
Marjing Polo Statue, the world's tallest polo player statue, standing inside the Marjing Polo Complex, dedicated to God Marjing, the Meitei deity of polo sports, in the Heingang Ching hills in Manipur

== History ==
=== Origins ===
Qutubuddin Aibak, a Turkic slave from Central Asia who later became the Sultan of Delhi, ruled for only four years, from 1206 to 1210, dying an accidental death during a game of polo in Lahore (in present-day Pakistan) when his horse fell and he was impaled on the pommel of his saddle. The sport was also popular among Mughal emperors who called it Chaugan. Emperor Akbar introduced an official set of rules for the sport.

The origins of the game in Manipur are traced to early precursors of Sagol Kangjei. This was one of three forms of hockey in Manipur, the other ones being field hockey (called Khong Kangjei) and wrestling-hockey (called Mukna Kangjei). Local rituals such as those connected to the Marjing, the Winged-Pony God of Polo and the creation-ritual episodes of the Lai Haraoba festival enacting the life of his son, Khori-Phaba, the polo-playing god of sports. These may indicate an origin earlier than the historical records of Manipur. Later, according to Chaitharol-Kumbaba, a Royal Chronicle of Manipur King Kangba who ruled Manipur much earlier than Nongda Lairen Pakhangba (33 AD) introduced Sagol Kangjei (Kangjei on horse back). Further regular playing of this game commenced in 1605 during the reign of King Khagemba under newly framed rules of the game. However it was the first Mughal emperor, Babur, who popularised the sport in India and ultimately made a significant influence on England.

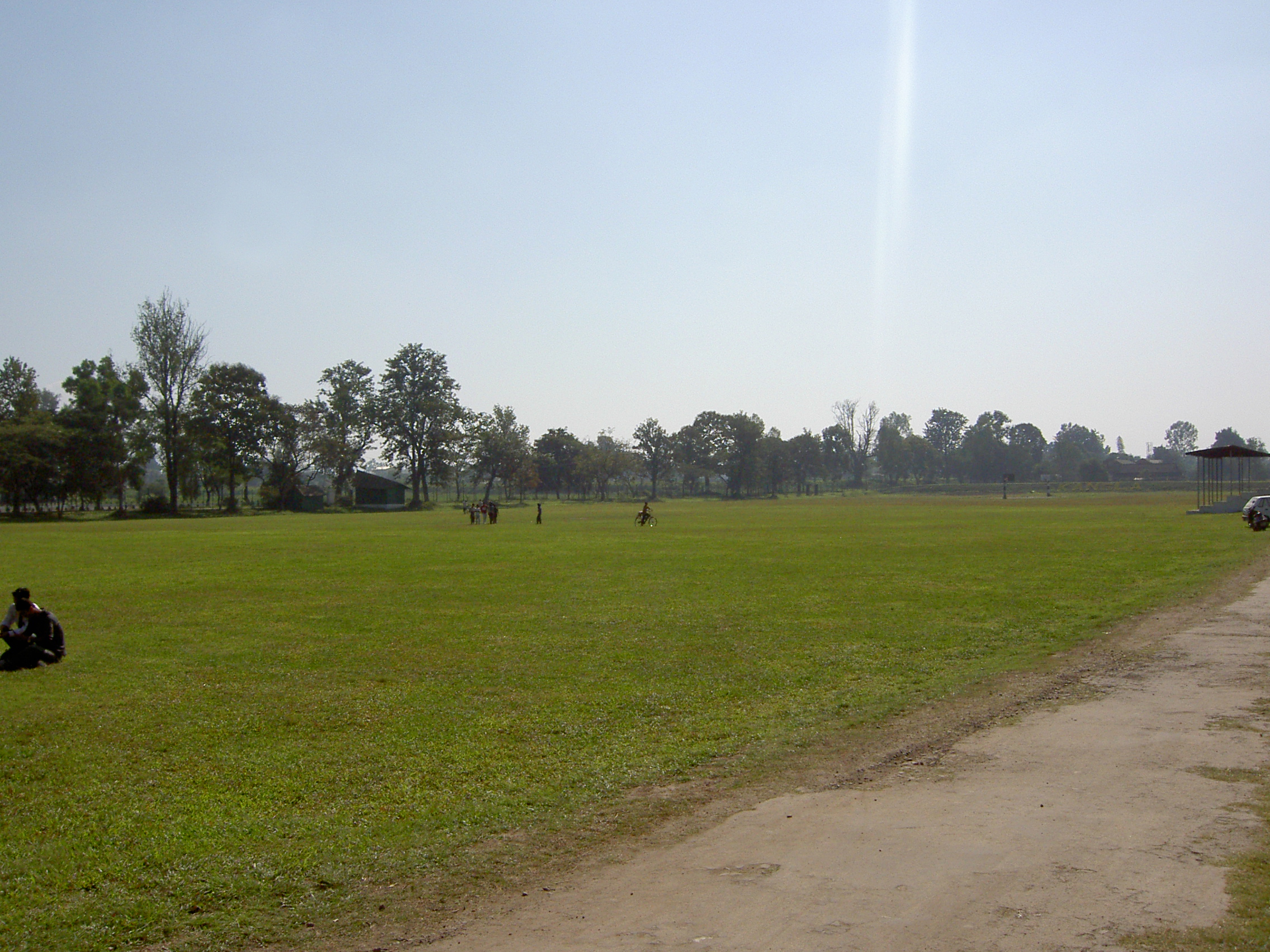
Old polo field in Imphal, Manipur

In Manipur, polo is traditionally played with seven players to a side. The players are mounted on the indigenous Manipuri pony, which stands less than 13 hands (52 inches, 132 cm). There are no goal posts, and a player scores simply by hitting the ball out of either end of the field. Players strike the ball with the long side of the mallet head, not the end. Players are not permitted to carry the ball, although blocking the ball with any part of the body except the open hand is permitted. The sticks are made of cane, and the balls are made from the roots of bamboo. Players protected their legs by attaching leather shields to their saddles and girths. In Manipur, the game was played even by commoners who owned a pony. The kings of Manipur had a royal polo ground within the ramparts of their Kangla Fort. Here they played Manung Kangjei Bung (literally, "Inner Polo Ground"). Public games were held, as they are still today, at the Mapan Kangjei Bung (literally "Outer Polo Ground"), a polo ground just outside the Kangla. Weekly games called Hapta Kangjei (Weekly Polo) were also played in a polo ground outside the current Palace.

The oldest polo ground in the world is the Imphal Polo Ground in Manipur State. The history of this pologround is contained in the royal chronicle "Cheitharol Kumbaba" starting from AD 33. Lieutenant (later Major General) Joseph Ford Sherer, the father of modern polo visited the state and played on this polo ground in the 1850s. Lord Curzon, the Viceroy of India visited the state in 1901 and measured the polo ground as "225 yards long and 110 yards wide" 225 by 110 yards (206 by 101 m).

=== Modern game ===
The first polo club in India was established at Silchar, Assam in 1834. In 1862, the oldest polo club still in existence, Calcutta Polo Club, was established by two British soldiers, Sherer and Captain Robert Stewart.

This version of polo played in the 19th century was different from the faster form that was played in Manipur. The game was slow and methodical, with little passing between players and few set plays that required specific movements by participants without the ball. Neither players nor horses were trained to play a fast, nonstop game. This form of polo lacked the aggressive methods and equestrian skills to play. From the 1800s to the 1910s, a host of teams representing Indian principalities dominated the international polo scene. Prominent teams of the period included Alwar, Bhopal, Bikaner, Jaipur, Hyderabad, Patiala, Jodhpur, Kishengarh and Kashmir. The majority of the Cavalry regiments of the British Army and the British Indian Army also fielded teams, the most prominent amongst them were the Central India Horse (CHI), Prince Albert Victor Own Cavalry (PAVO’s Cav), the Inniskilling Dragoon Guards, the 10th Royal Hussars, the 15th Lancers, and the 17/21st Lancers. The Jaipur team won all the open tournaments in Britain and the Indian Championship in 1933 creating a record that is unlikely to be broken. The team also won the Indian Open Championship every year from 1930 to 1938.

The Indian Polo Association (IPA) was founded in 1892. The outbreak of the second World War and the mechanization of cavalry units resulted in a decline in interest in Indian polo. The Calcutta Polo Club was the first polo club in the country to resume hosting tournaments post-independence. Polo clubs in Jaipur, Delhi, Bombay and Hyderabad subsequently began holding regular tournaments. The IPA invited the Argentine national polo team to visit India in 1950 and play an exhibition games across the country in a bid to revive interest in the sport. The Argentine team participated in tournaments in Jaipur, Delhi and Bombay. The Pakistan Army polo team visited India in 1955. The IPA also revived the Indian Polo Championship in 1956, after a gap of 17 years. The India national polo team participated in the 1957 World Championship in France and won the tournament. These events helped revive interest in polo in the country. Indian polo received another boost after the Indian Army officially adopted polo as a sport granting access to new grounds and stables of horses.

Indian President Fakhruddin Ali Ahmed consented to be the Patron-in-Chief of the IPA, resulting in the introduction of a new trophy called The President's Cup in 1975. The IPA marked its 100th anniversary in 1992.

In the year 1992 the IPA completed 100 years and since then polo is on an upward trend in the country. Today we have 33 Polo Clubs registered with IPA. Polo has been revived at Leh in Ladakh, at Udaipur and Jodhpur in Rajasthan, Hyderabad and Bangalore in South India. Polo is now not only the domain of the Army but a number of corporate and industrial houses are supporting teams in the domestic polo circuit.

=== World Polo Championship ===
No	Year	Host	Position
1	1995	St. Moritz, Switzerland	Preliminary Round
2	2001	Melbourne, Australia	Preliminary Round
3	2011	Estancia Grande (San Luis), Argentina	Preliminary Round
4	2017	Sydney, Australia	Preliminary Round

- updated till 2023

=== List of National Sports award recipients in Polo, showing the year, award, and gender ===
Year	Recipient	Award	Gender
1961	Prem Singh	Arjuna Award	Male
1963	Kishen Singh	Arjuna Award	Male
1964	Hanut Singh	Arjuna Award	Male
1975	V. P. Singh (Brigadier)	Arjuna Award	Male
1983	R. S. Sodhi	Arjuna Award	Male
1987	Kuldeep Singh Garcha	Arjuna Award	Male
2012	Samir Suhag	Arjuna Award	Male
2018	Ravi Rathore	Arjuna Award	Male
2019	Simran Singh Shergill	Arjuna Award	Male
