= Kalaji Rathore =

Kalaji Rathore, also known as Jhumjharji, or Kalaji was a Rajput warrior and folk deity of Rajasthan. He was born on the 8th day of Ashwin Shukla in Vikram Samvat 1601.

== Early life ==
Kalaji belongs to the Rathore clan of Rajputs. He was born into royal the family of Merta, in the Rathore clan of Rajputs, on the 8th day of Ashwin Shukla in Vikram Samvat 1601.

== History ==
When Akbar attacked Merta, Rao Jaimwal, Asa Singh and Kalaji fought him. After the defeat, Jaimal went to Chittorgarh where Rana Udai Singh granted him the Jagir of Badnore. Kalaji was appointed senior warrior on the Gujarat border and given the Jagir of Randhalpur. Later, Kalaji married Krishna, daughter of Rao Krishnadas of Shivgarh. During the wedding he received news that Akbar had attacked Chittor, and was left for Chittor with his army.

Maharana appointed Jaimal as commander of Chittor. Akbar's army besieged the fort. After several days of fighting, with few defenders remaining, Jaimal ordered soldiers to wear saffron clothes for the final battle. On the night of 23 February 1568, the women of Chittor performed Jauhar. On 24 February, the merwari warriors opened the gates and attacked the Mughal army. During the battle, Jaimal was shot in the leg and could not stand. Kalaji carried him on his shoulders, with a sword in each of jaimal's hands, while holding a sword in each of his own hands. Both were severely wounded. While assisting Jaimal, kalaji was attached from behind and beheaded. Some accounts state his body continued to fight afterward.

Kalaji is worshiped as a folk deity in Rajasthan. An annual procession is held in his memory, in which participants wear saffron turbans and perform songs and dances.

== Temples ==
According to his devotees, Kalaji Rathore was a warrior who protected the gates of Chittor Fort against the attacks of Mughal emperor Akbar. Near Chittorgarh fort there are two main shrines of Kalaji Rathore located about 60 miles from the fort. These shrines are believed to have been built on the places where kalaji's head and body were laid to rest.

At Rundela, also known as the "place od the body", a Rajput shaman takes care of Kalaji's shrine. Kalaji is said to have received his spiritual knowledge from his teacher Bhairava. Bhairava is worshiped throughout India and guards the entrances of many goddess temples. The shaman at Rundela focuses less on ritual rules. Instead, he emphasizes Kalaji's hidden tantric power. This is different from Udaipur Brahman Shil Sharma, who wrote a famous verse Pamphlet about Kalaji's and stressed ritual purity. The shrine is also looked after by a Brahmin caretaker.

== Marriage and siblings ==
According to traditions, Kalaji Rathore had three brothers: Dantvad, Goverdhanji, and himself (Kalaji).

Kalaji was married to Krishna, the daughter of Rao Krishnadas of Shivgarh.

== See also ==
- Karni Mata
- Siege of Chittorgarh (1567–1568)

== Bibliography ==
- भानावत (Bhanawat), डॉ. महेन्द्र (Dr. Mahendra) (2019). लोकदेवता वीर कल्लाजी राठौड़ (Lokdevta Veer Kallaji Rathore) (in Hindi). ISBN 9789387297456.
