= Patta Sisodia =

Commander of Chittor in the Siege of Chittorgarh

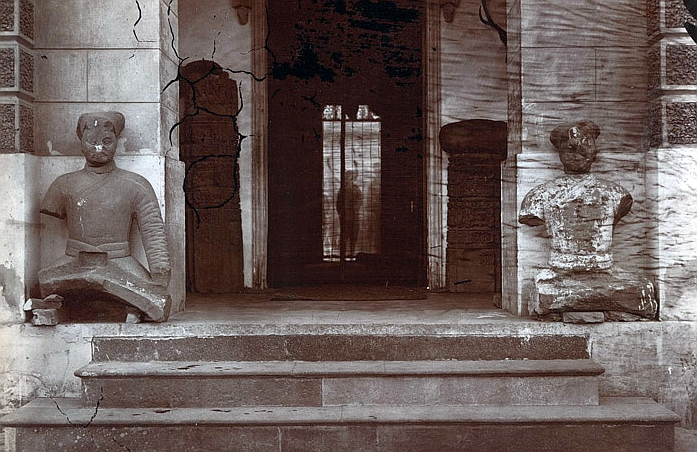
- Statues of Jaimal and Patta at the gates of the Red Fort, Delhi
- Born: 1551
- Died: 23 February 1568 (aged 16–17)
- House: Sisodia

Patta Sisodia or Rawat Patta Chundawat was one of the principal servants of Udai Singh II and ruler of jagir of Kailwa. He participated in the Siege of Chittorgarh. He was one of the commanders of Chittorgarh Fort during the Siege of Chittogarh. Jauhar was committed in his', Aissar Das Chohan's and Sahib Khan's house after the death of Jaimal Rathore, the governor of the fort.

== Background ==
When his father died near Udaipur in a battle in 1555, he at age 4 was made the Ruler of Kailwa. He was trusted enough by Udai Singh to be placed as the commander of Chittor in 1567 when he was 16.

== Death ==
The Akbarnama tells that when Akbar was marching towards the fort with his army after his military victory, an elephant of his army accidentally trampled a person. When a mahout brought him to Akbar, the man was later identified as Patta.

H.M. (His majesty) related that he had come near the temple of Gobind Syām when an elephant-driver trampled a man under his elephant. The elephant rolled him up in his trunk and brought him before H.M. The driver said that he did not know the man's name, but that he appeared to be one of the leaders, and that a large number of men had fought round him with sacrifice of their lives. At last it came out that it was Patā who had been trampled to death. At the time he was produced, there was a breath of life left in him, but he shortly afterwards died. ~ Akbarnama by Abu'l Fazl

== Portrayal in adaptions ==
In the Indian historical fiction Bharat Ka Veer Putra - Maharana Pratap, Rushiraj Pawar played the role of Patta.
