= Rathod (surname) =

Rathod is a surname of Indian origin.

== Surname ==
People with this surname include:

- Amol Rathod, Indian cinematographer
- Anil Rathod (1950 - 2020), Indian politician
- Bhakti Rathod, Indian actress
- Bhavsinh Rathod, Indian politician
- Darshan Rathod, Indian film score composer
- Dipsinh Shankarsinh Rathod, Indian politician
- Govind Mukkaji Rathod, Indian politician
- Hansmukh Rathod, Indian astrologer
- Hardik Rathod, Indian cricketer
- Harising Nasaru Rathod, Indian politician
- Kalu Rathod, Indian politician
- Kama Rathod, Indian politician
- Kanjibhai Rathod, Indian film director
- Kiran Rathod, Indian actress
- Nick Rathod, American non-profit administrator
- Nikhil Rathod, Indian cricketer
- Pranali Rathod, Indian actress
- Ramesh Rathod (1966 - 2024), Indian politician
- Rathod Bapu Rao, Indian politician
- Reewa Rathod, Indian singer and songwriter
- Roop Kumar Rathod, Indian singer and musician
- Samira Rathod, Indian architect
- Sanjay Rathod, Indian politician
- Sanjeev Rathod, Indian film score composer
- Sanju Rathod, Indian singer
- Satyavathi Rathod, Indian politician
- Yash Rathod Hingoli, Banjara, marathi Actor, lirics, politicians
- Shahabuddin Rathod, Indian scholar
- Shardul Rathod, Indian film writer
- Sunali Rathod, Indian singer
- Uttam Rathod, Indian politician
- Vinod Rathod, Indian singer
- Nitin Rathod, Indian software developer

== See also ==
- Rathore (disambiguation)
- Rathore (surname)
