= Rathore =

Rathore or Rathod may refer

- Rathore dynasty, a dynasty of India
- Rathore (Rajput clan), a clan of Rajput caste
- Rathore (surname), an Indian surname
- Rathod (surname), an Indian surname

== See also ==
- Rath (disambiguation)
- Rather (disambiguation)
- Rathodia, a Hindu caste in Gujarat, India
