= Rather =

Rather may refer to:

- Ratherius, bishop of Verona

== Surname ==
- Abdul Rahim Rather (born 1957), an Indian politician from Jammu and Kashmir
- Dan Rather, news presenter
  - Rather, 2023 documentary by Frank Marshall about the news presenter
- Elizabeth Rather, expert in the computer programming language Forth
- Hilal Ahmed Rather, Indian Air Force air vice marshal from Kashmir

== See also ==
- would rather
- "Rather Be (disambiguation)" (song title)
