= Bal Krishen Rathore =

Indian businessman

- Citizenship: India
- Occupations: Businessman; investor; entrepreneur

Bal Krishen Rathore is an Indian businessman, investor, and entrepreneur and the chairman and CEO of Century Financial based in the United Arab Emirates. He was listed in the top 100 inspiring leaders in the UAE by Arabian Business. He has been granted the Golden Visa by the government of UAE in 2021.

== Early life ==
Rathore grew up in a small district in the Indian state of Jammu & Kashmir as one of the nine siblings in a family with limited means. He started his career by working in the hospitality industry in Dubai. Rathore met Sulaiman Baqer Mohebi, an Emirati entrepreneur, the Chairman of Century Financial, and started as a dealer for the company in 1999.

Rathore started as a dealer in Century Financial in 1999. Rathore looked after transactions across exchanges. Later he became the chairman and CEO of the company.

== Awards & recognitions ==
Year of Award or Honor	Name of Award or Honor	Awarding Organization
2018	Emerging Leaders - Financial Services	Khaleej Times
2018	100 Inspiring Leaders in the Middle East	Arabian Business
2021	CEO of the Year in Financial Industry 2021	World Business Outlook Awards

== Initiatives ==
Rathore and his company Century Financial had an agreement with the government of India to invest 100 million dollars in Jammu and Kashmir.

== See also ==
- M. A. Yusuff Ali
- Tariq Chauhan
