= V. P. Singh (brigadier) =

Brigadier V. P. Singh
- Brigadier V. P. Singh (2nd from left ) with the President of India - Giani Zail Singh
- Born: 16 October 1940; Patiala, Punjab, India
- Died: 2012 (aged 71–72); Gurgaon, Haryana, India
- Military career
- Allegiance: India
- Branch: (India) Indian Army
- Service years: c.1960s–1990s
- Rank: Brigadier
- Units: 61st Cavalry (India); President's Bodyguard (India)
- Commands: 61st Cavalry; President’s Bodyguard
- Awards: Arjuna Award (1975)

Brigadier Virendra Pal Singh (16 October 1940 – 2012) was an officer of the Indian Army and a leading Indian polo and equestrian. He served with both the 61st Cavalry and the President’s Bodyguard, and is noted as the only Indian polo player in the post-Independence era to have attained a seven-goal handicap. He was awarded the Arjuna Award in 1975 for his achievements in polo.

== Early life and education ==
Singh was born in Patiala, Punjab, on 16 October 1940. He studied at the Lawrence School, Sanawar, where he developed an interest in riding and polo. His aptitude for horsemanship was evident early in life. After completing school, he entered the National Defence Academy (NDA), and later trained at the Indian Military Academy (IMA) in Dehradun. At the IMA, Singh distinguished himself by winning both the Sword of Honour and the Gold Medal, awarded for overall excellence and leadership potential.

== Military career ==
=== 61st Cavalry ===
Upon commissioning in the early 1960s, Singh was posted to the 61st Cavalry, the last remaining non-mechanised horse-mounted cavalry regiment in the world. The unit combined ceremonial duties with competitive equestrian sports. In 1966, Singh became the first Indian officer selected for the advanced equitation course at Saumur, France, where he trained and competed against Olympic riders.

He rose to command the regiment and eventually became the only officer of the 61st Cavalry promoted to the rank of Brigadier, breaking the traditional ceiling that limited cavalry officers to lower ranks due to the unit’s ceremonial focus.

=== President’s Bodyguard ===
Between 1975 and 1980, Singh commanded the President’s Bodyguard (PBG), India’s senior-most cavalry regiment and ceremonial guard to the President of India. The PBG has long been associated with polo, and Singh strengthened its equestrian profile during his command. His tenure contributed to the regiment’s continued role as one of the key centres of polo in India. Singh also served with the President’s Bodyguard (India), where he later became Commandant. Both PBG and 61st Cavalry maintained active equestrian programmes, and Singh was among the most prominent polo players produced by these regiments.

== Polo and equestrian career ==
Singh was active in polo from the mid-1960s to the 1980s.

- He made his international debut at Cannes, France, in 1965.
- 1989 – Captained the Indian team in a three-match series in Lahore, Pakistan, where India won after a gap of 29 years.
- He captained the Commonwealth Polo Team at Windsor against England in a match led by the Prince of Wales.
- He represented India in tournaments in the United Kingdom, United States, Australia, Kenya, Ethiopia and Italy.
- He played five seasons of high-goal polo in the United States, including at Palm Beach, Florida and he was awarded Most Valuable Player at the Santa Barbara Polo Club .
- Singh achieved a handicap of +7 goals, the highest for any Indian player in the post-Independence period, and a level not since equalled by any of his compatriots.

=== Equestrian disciplines ===
In addition to polo, Singh competed successfully in show jumping, dressage, eventing, and tent pegging. He won prizes at national equestrian competitions, and in 1966 he judged at the Dublin International Horse Show. He was also associated with the International Equestrian Federation.

Singh’s involvement in these disciplines contributed to the development of equestrian sport in India at a time when the Army played a crucial role in sustaining it.

Singh was conferred the Arjuna Award in 1975 for his contribution to polo.

== Family ==
Singh was married to Virendra Kumari of Kutch. The couple had three children: two daughters and a son, Bhishma Pal Singh, who also became a polo player and attained a two-goal handicap. One daughter, Yogini, pursued equestrian sports and competed in dressage at the junior national level.

== Later life ==
After retiring from the Army, Singh settled near Gurgaon, Haryana, where he continued to train horses and remained involved in polo. He also advised the Indian Polo Association. He died in 2012 at the age of 72.

== Legacy ==
In 2019, the Brigadier V. P. Singh Memorial Polo Cup was instituted at the Jaipur Polo Ground, Delhi, to commemorate his contribution to Indian polo.

== Awards and recognition ==
- Arjuna Award (1975) – for polo
- Most Valuable Player, Santa Barbara Polo Club
- Multiple national polo and equestrian titles

== See also ==
- 61st Cavalry (India)
- President’s Bodyguard (India)
- Polo in India
