= Badnor =

- Town
- Location in Rajasthan, India
- Coordinates: 25.8355094°N 74.2774701°E
- Country: India
- State: Rajasthan
- District: Beawar

Population (2011)
  - Total: 9,217
- Sex ratio 4661/4556 ♂/♀
- Time zone: UTC+5:30 (IST)
- ISO 3166 code: RJ-IN
- Vehicle registration: RJ-

Badnor or Badnore is a town and a panchayat in Beawar district of Rajasthan, India. It is a Tehsil (sub-division) for many villages. The town has a magistrate's office, a lower justice court, and many administrative hubs for many major villages.

== Landmarks ==
Badnor Fort is an example of a medieval Indian military style of architecture. This seven-storied fort stands atop a hill and presents extensive views all around. There are a number of small monuments and temples within the precincts of Badnor Fort in Rajasthan India and around it. The buildings within Badnore Fort Bhilwara are all built in the traditional Rajputana style of architecture, which is a local variation of the extensive Hindu style of architecture. There is also an ancient mosque built by Sultan Feroze Shah Tughluq.

== History ==
Badnore was granted as a 'jagir' of Badnore along with 210 villages in 1554 to Jaimal Rathore. Jaimal Rathore is the grandson of Rao Duda and the brother of the Hindu Saint Mirabai. The current Thakur is his 19th descendent Ranjai Singh, married to Kanwarani Archana Singh of Pratapgarh
