= Jaimal Rathore =

Ruler of Merta and defender of Chittorgarh (1507–1568)

Rao Jaimal Rathore
- राव जयमल राठौड़
- Born: 17 September 1507; Merta, Marwar
- Died: 23 February 1568 (aged 60); Chittor Fort, Mewar
- Cause of death: Killed in action during the final Saka charge
- Monuments: Chhatri cenotaph between Bhairon Pol and Hanuman Pol, Chittor Fort; Stone elephant statues at Agra Fort Delhi Gate
- Spouse: Rani Phool Kanwar
- Father: Rao Veeram Dev of Merta
- Relatives: Mirabai (first cousin); Rao Jodha (great-grandfather); Rao Duda (grandfather); Kallaji Rathore (kinsman)
- Military career
- Allegiance: Kingdom of Mewar
- Branch: Mertia Rathore
- Rank: First-Class Noble (Solah Umrao)
- Commands: Commander-in-Chief of Chittor Fort
- Conflicts: Siege of Merta (1562); Siege of Chittorgarh (1567–1568)

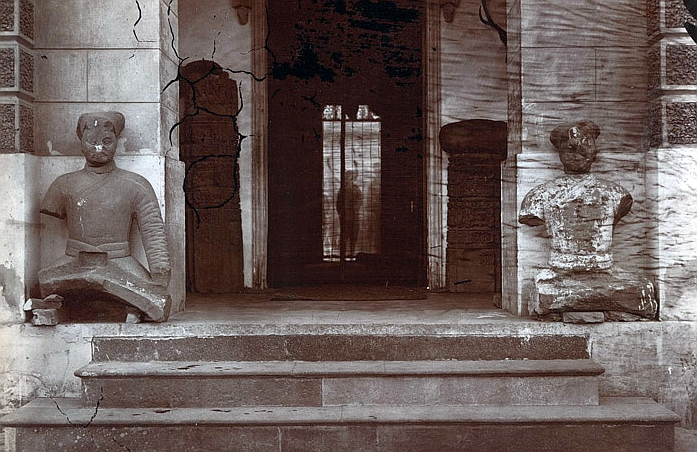
Rao Jaimal and Patta (Rajasthan), mounted on a pair of black marble elephants which stood outside the Delhi Gate at the Red Fort. They originally stood outside the fort at Agra.

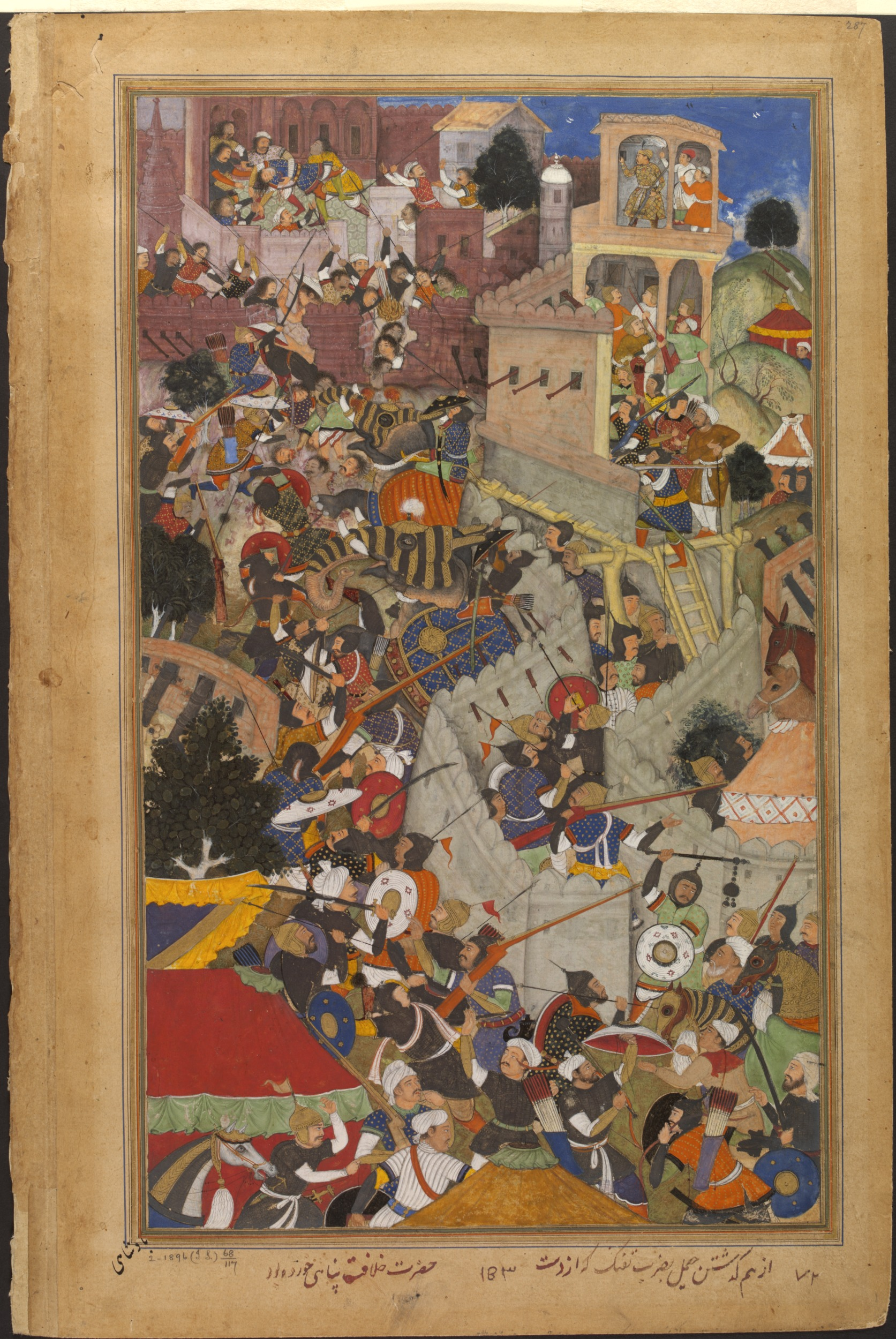
The Mughal Emperor Akbar shoots the Rajput commander Jaimal during the Siege of Chittorgarh in 1568 (contemporary Akbarnama illustration).

Rao Jaimal Rathore (17 September 1507 – 23 February 1568) was the 16th-century Rathore Rajput ruler of Merta and a premier noble (Solah Umrao) of Mewar holding the fief of Badnor. He is renowned in Indian military history for his heroic leadership as commander-in-chief of the Chittorgarh garrison alongside Patta Sisodia during the Siege of Chittorgarh (1567–1568) against the forces of Mughal Emperor Akbar.

== Lineage and early life ==
Jaimal was born into the Mertia (Mertiya) cadet branch of the Rathore dynasty, established by his grandfather Rao Duda (a son of Rao Jodha Rathore, the founder of Jodhpur). He was the son of Rao Veeram Dev of Merta and a first cousin of the celebrated Krishna devotee and mystic poetess Mirabai.

Upon his father's death, Jaimal succeeded as the ruler of Merta. In 1553 and throughout the subsequent decade, Jaimal resisted subordination to the expanding power of Rao Maldeo of Marwar and later the imperial Mughal generals. Following the capture of Merta by Mughal forces led by Sharfuddin Hussain in 1562, Jaimal sought refuge in the court of Udai Singh II of Mewar. Recognizing his martial capabilities, Maharana Udai Singh granted him the strategic frontier jagir of Badnor encompassing 210 villages, elevating him to the first rank of Mewar nobles.

== Siege of Chittorgarh (1567–1568) ==
In October 1567, Emperor Akbar laid siege to the colossal fortress of Chittorgarh. Following strategic council deliberations, Maharana Udai Singh II retreated to the surrounding Aravalli hills to conduct prolonged guerrilla resistance, leaving a garrison of approximately 8,000 Rajput warriors and 1,000 musketeers under the joint command of Rao Jaimal Rathore and Patta Sisodia of Kelwa.

Jaimal coordinated the garrison's defense for nearly five months, personally supervising the northern battlements and the Lakhota Gate (Lakhota Bari). The defenders repeatedly neutralized Mughal sapping attempts and repaired walls breached by imperial siege guns.

=== Death in action ===
On the night of 22 February 1568, while directing the urgent repair of a breach near the Lakhota Outpost illuminated by torches and wearing a distinctive cuirass known as the hazār mīkhī (thousand nails), Jaimal was spotted by Emperor Akbar from an imperial siege trench (sabat). Akbar aimed his personal matchlock musket, named Sangram, and fired, striking Jaimal in the leg and inflicting a crippling wound.

"At this time H.M. (Akbar) perceived that a person clothed in a cuirass known as the hazār mīkhī (thousand nails) which is a mark of chieftainship among them, came to the breach and superintended the proceedings. It was not known who he was. H.M. took his gun Sangrām, which is one of the special guns, and aimed it at him..... And in fact on the morning when the breeze of victory and dominion arose, it was ascertained that the Shāhinshāh's musket had reached Jaimal, the governor of the fort, and had at once destroyed both him and the fort."

— Abu'l Fazl, Akbarnama

With the breach untenable and their commander incapacitated, the Rajputs resolved upon the final rites of Jauhar and Saka. That night, thousands of women within the fort immolated themselves in subterranean fire pits.

On the morning of 23 February 1568, the garrison donned saffron robes and opened the gates for the final charge. Because Jaimal could not walk due to his injury, his kinsman Kallaji Rathore carried him into battle upon his shoulders. Wielding twin swords from Kallaji's shoulders, Jaimal engaged imperial troops near the Bhairon Pol and Hanuman Pol until both were slain in combat.

One of his sons, Ramdas Rathore, later commanded the Mewar forces alongside Maharana Pratap at the Battle of Haldighati (1576), where he died fighting.

== Legacy ==
In recognition of the gallantry displayed by Jaimal and Patta, Emperor Akbar ordered life-sized statues of both commanders carved in stone and mounted on war elephants to be erected at the Delhi Gate of the Agra Fort. Although the original statues were later removed during the reign of Aurangzeb, their pedestals and presence were recorded by European travelers including François Bernier.

A Chhatri cenotaph marks the site where Jaimal fell between the Bhairon Pol and Hanuman Pol at Chittorgarh, which remains an enduring monument of Rajput chivalry.

== In popular culture ==
- In the 2013–2015 television series Bharat Ka Veer Putra – Maharana Pratap, broadcast by Sony Entertainment Television, Jaimal was portrayed by Ved Thappar.

== See also ==
- Patta Sisodia
- Kallaji Rathore
- Siege of Chittorgarh (1567–1568)
- Mertiya
- Badnor, Rajasthan
