= 61st Cavalry (India) =

Active Indian Army horse cavalry unit

- 61st Cavalry Insignia
- Active: 1953–present
- Country: India
- Allegiance: India
- Branch: Indian Army
- Type: Cavalry
- Size: Regiment
- Mottos: अश्व-शक्ति यशोबल "Ashva Shakti Yashobal" (Horse Power is Supreme Strength)
- Equipment: Horse
- Decorations: Padma Shri 1 Sarvottam Jeevan Raksha Padak 1 VSM 6 COAS Commendation Card 53; CNS Commendation Card 51; VCOAS Commendation Card 7 Army Commander's Commendation Card 152; CISC Commendation Card 7
- Battle honours: Haifa

Commanders
- Colonel of the Regiment: General Dhiraj Seth

Insignia
- Abbreviation: 61 Cav

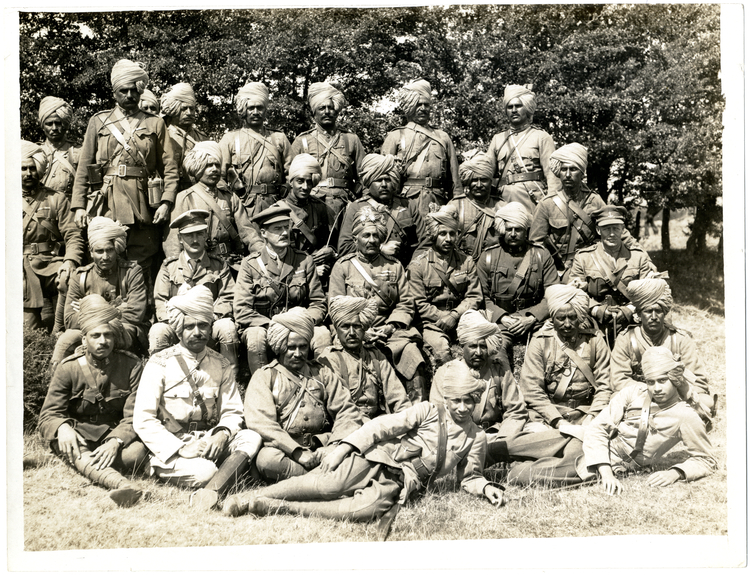
Officers of the Jodhpur Lancers in Linghem, France, 1915

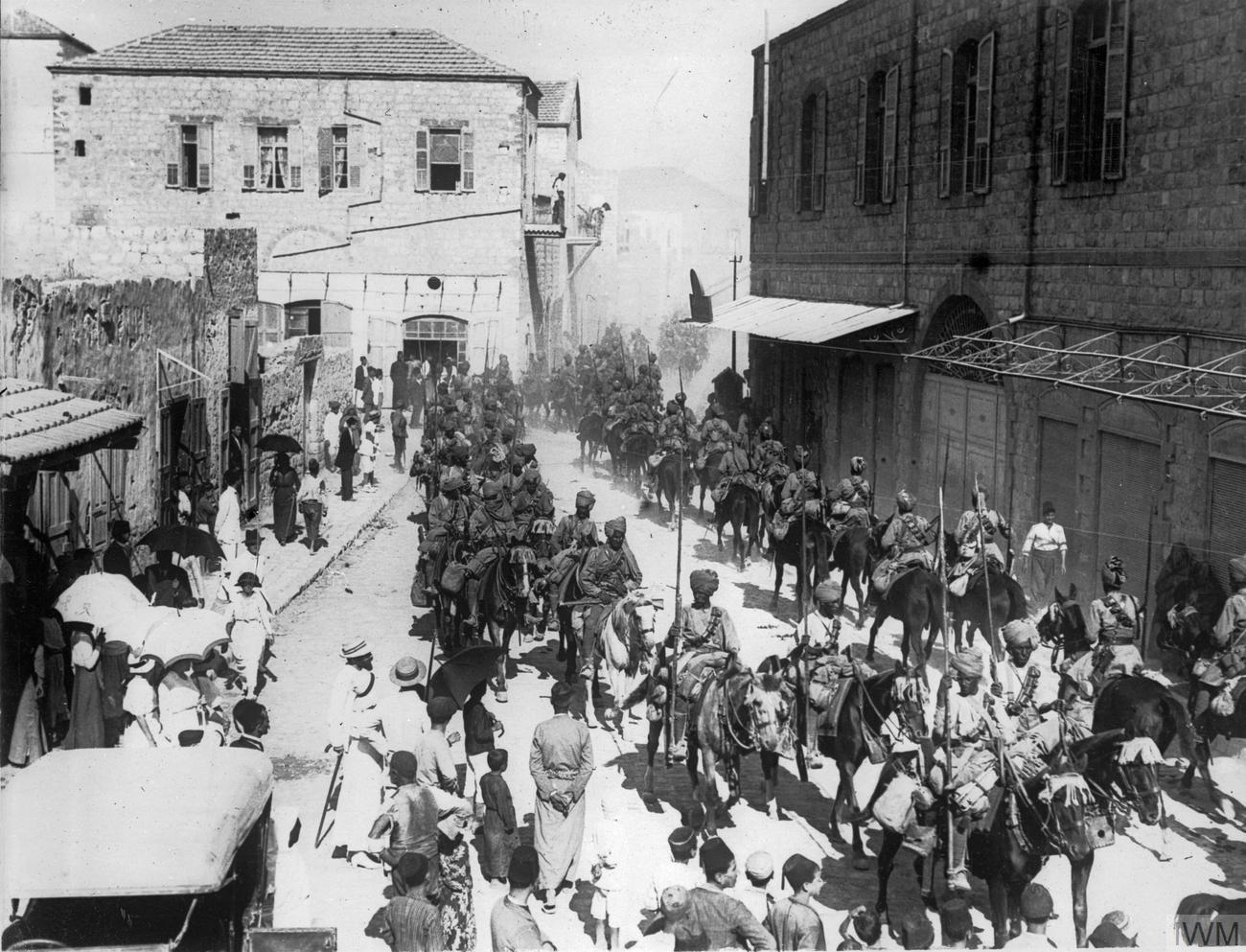
Indian lancers in Haifa, 1918

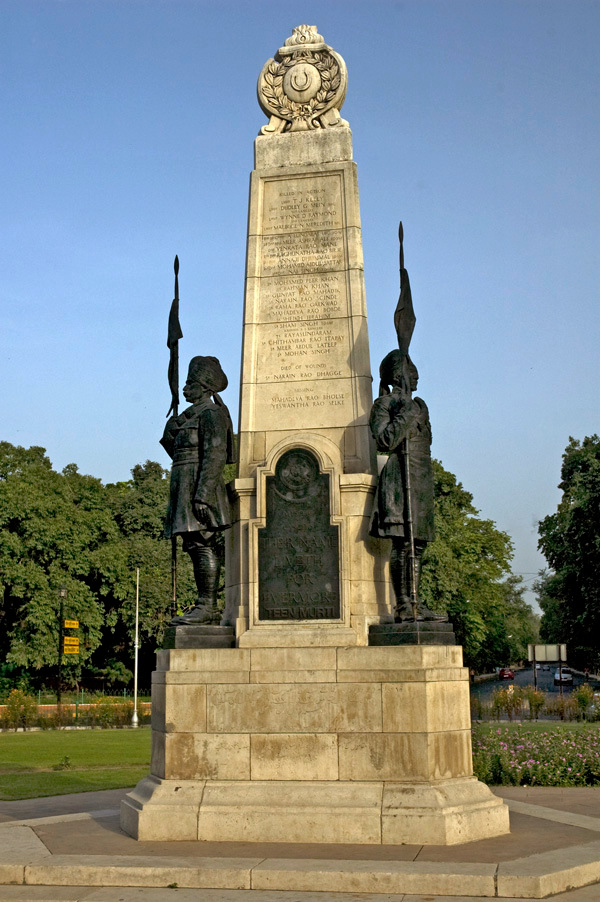
Teen Murti Memorial in New Delhi, built 1922

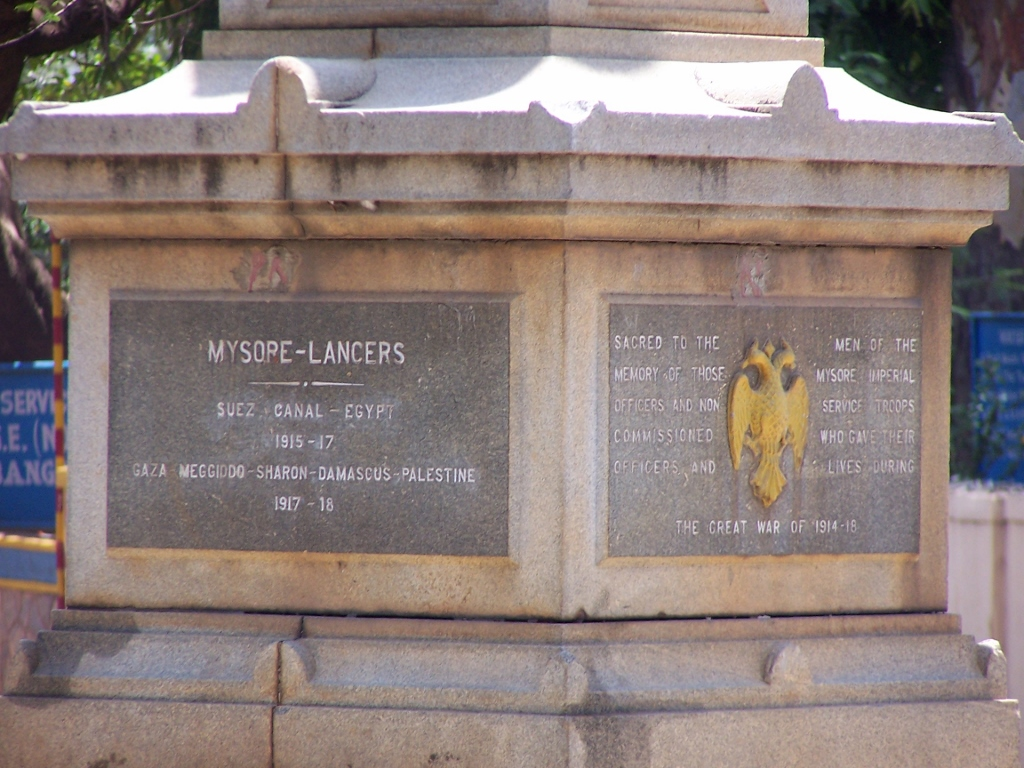
Mysore Lancers Memorial, Bangalore

The 61st Cavalry Regiment is a horse-mounted cavalry regiment of the Indian Army. It is notable for being one of the largest, and also one of the last, operational non mechanised horse-mounted cavalry units in the world. Formerly deployed into active conflict, the 61st Cavalry is currently employed on ceremonial occasions, though it can be deployed for internal security or provide military aid to the civil power.

The regiment is presently based in Jaipur. The 61st Cavalry regiment and the President's Bodyguard parade in full dress uniform for the Delhi Republic Day parade each year, in what is probably the largest assemblage of traditional cavalry still to be seen in the world.

== Modern role ==
The 61st Cavalry regiment is one of the few non-mechanised horse mounted cavalry regiments in the world, alongside such units as the Household Cavalry Mounted Regiment of the British Army, the Presidential Cavalry Escort Battalion of the Kremlin Regiment of the Federal Protective Service and the 4th Mountain Cavalry Regiment of the Argentinean Army. While a number of armies still maintain mounted units for parade and other ceremonial purposes, only the People's Liberation Army maintains an operational squadron-sized mounted cavalry unit for frontier duties.

== History ==
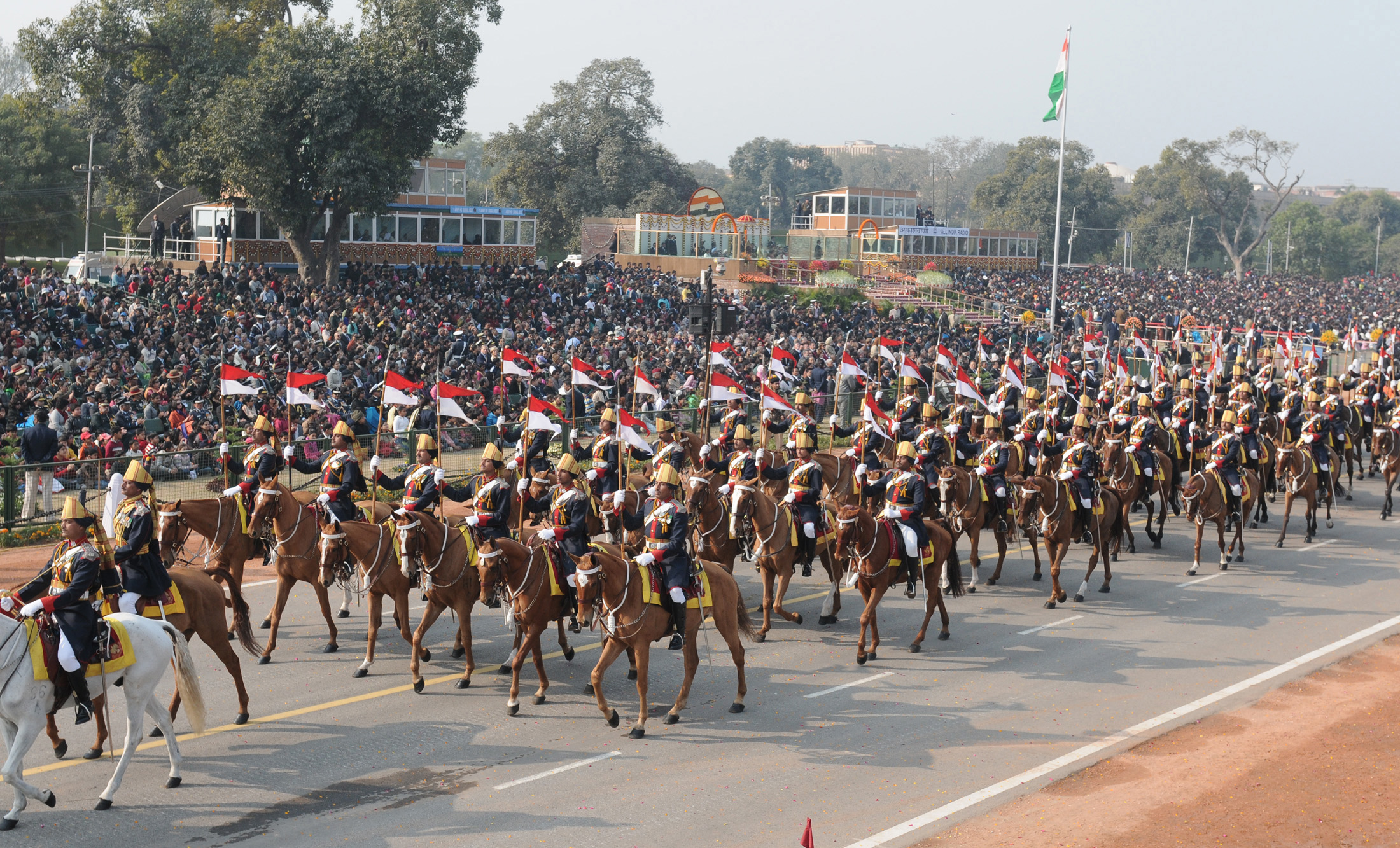
The 61 Cavalry contingent passes through the Rajpath during the 62nd Republic Day Parade-2011, in New Delhi on 26 January 2011

=== Formation ===
At the time of Indian Independence in 1947, the only mounted cavalry remaining in service were the Governor General's Bodyguard and several units that had formed part of the Imperial Service State Forces, provided by the Indian Princely States. Upon the integration of the State Forces into the Indian Army in 1951, the remaining horsed cavalry units were reorganized and reconstituted into the Gwalior Lancers, the Jodhpur/Kachhawa Horse, the Mysore Lancers, and B Squadron, 2nd Patiala Lancers.

In May 1953 it was decided to amalgamate these separate horsed cavalry units into a single regiment. On 1 October 1953 the "New Horsed Cavalry Regiment" was established at Gwalior, with Lieutenant Colonel Phulel Singh of the Jammu and Kashmir State Forces as its first Commandant. The new regiment was re-designated as the "61st Cavalry Regiment" in January 1954.

The following cavalry regiments were amalgamated to form the 61st Cavalry:

- Gwalior Lancers, formed by amalgamation of 1st and 2nd Gwalior Lancers
- Jodhpur/Kachhawa Horse, formed by amalgamation of Dungal Lancers, Mangal Lancers, Jodhpur Lancers, Kachhawa Horse, Mewar Lancers, Rajendra Lancers and Sardar Rissalia
- Mysore Lancers
- B Squadron, 2 Patiala Lancers
- Saurashtra Horsed Cavalry Squadron

=== Deployments ===
During the Indo-Pakistani War of 1965, 61st Cavalry was deployed as part of the 67th Infantry Brigade, commanded by Brigadier Bant Singh, to cover approaches to Ganganagar, under then-Commandant Lieutenant Colonel Thakur Govind Singh. The area of responsibility was nearly a 100 km (62 mi) of semi-desert terrain. While armed police detachments manned border outposts to mark sovereignty, 61st Cavalry carried out intensive night patrols on horseback. No enemy infiltration or penetration was reported.

In 1970, Lieutenant General Mohinder Singh Wadalia, the regiment's long-standing colonel, retired. During this time, when the Indian Army was being pruned, it was suggested that the unit's future depended on having a strong, energetic successor. In a strategic move it was decided to invite the then-Army Chief, General Sam Manekshaw, to be the next colonel of the 61st Cavalry. Manekshaw realised that the 61st Cavalry needed a change in role, otherwise the military and civilian bureaucracy would mechanise it. In the prelude to the Indo-Pakistani War of 1971, Manekshaw moved the regiment to Delhi to guard the Rashtrapati Bhawan, ensure the internal defence of Delhi, and conduct dismounted ceremonials. The 61st Cavalry presented the first guard of honour to Sheikh Mujibur Rahman on his release from a Pakistani prison in January 1972.

In 1974, the Krishna Rao Committee, in its report on the Army's reorganisation, recommended a cutdown in the 61st Cavalry's strength. Consequently, a whole sabre squadron was disbanded along with specialist troops for mortars, medium machine guns, light machine guns, and signals communication. One sabre squadron was permanently stationed at Delhi for performing ceremonial duties.

In 1977, the regiment participated in the Military Tattoo at Pune and the Royal Edinburgh Military Tattoo in Scotland to commemorate the Silver Jubilee of Elizabeth II.

The regiment has taken part in several combat operations, including Operation Pawan, Operation Rakshak, Operation Vijay, and Operation Parakram.

=== Possible mechanisation and disbandment ===
Based on the recommendations of the 2016 Shekatkar Committee report, the Indian Army reportedly initiated a move in mid-2020 to mechanise the 61st Cavalry and create a new armoured regiment. The move plans to bring together three independent squadrons of other regiments under the headquarters of 61st Cavalry to form the new armoured regiment. The move is being initiated to cut costs and draws from a proposal to change the regiment's role to an active armoured regiment.

== Battle honours ==
The 61st Cavalry has 39 battle honours passed on from its predecessors, including "China, 1900", "Cambrai, 1917", "Waziristan, 1917", "France and Flanders 1914-1918", "Suez Canal – Egypt, 1917-1918", "Gaza", "Megiddo", "Sharon", "Damascus and Palestine, 1917-1918", "Afghanistan, 1919", and "Haifa-Aleppo, 1919".

== Cenotaph ==
The Teen Murti Memorial is a cenotaph memorializing soldiers from the 15th (Imperial Service) Cavalry Brigade, from the princely states of Jodhpur, Hyderabad, and Mysore, who fought and died under British command while taking part in the Battle of Haifa on 23 September 1918, during World War I. The capture of Haifa and its port allowed the Allies to send supplies closer to the front.

23 September is remembered annually in India as Haifa Day, commemorating the 15th Cavalry Brigade's actions during the Battle of Haifa.

== Regimental insignia ==
The regimental insignia is adapted from the Gandaberunda of the Mysore Lancers. It consists of the two headed eagle and a scroll below with the words 'Sixty First Cavalry'. The shoulder title consists of "61C" in brass. The motto of the regiment is अश्व-शक्ति यशोबल (Ashva Shakti Yashobal) which translates to ‘"Horse Power is Supreme Strength".

== Recruitment ==
The regiment recruits Rajputs, Marathas, and Qaimkhanis in equal numbers. This ratio was established on Prime Minister Jawaharlal Nehru's instructions.

== Sports ==
The regiment has a strong polo tradition, producing some of India's best polo players. Members of the regiment have won 12 Arjuna awards—India's highest award for outstanding sportsmen—five times for polo and seven times for equestrian events.

== Notable servicemen ==
- Brigadier Virendra Pal Singh, a former commandant was awarded the Arjuna Award in 1975, one of the earliest polo players to be honoured with the distinction.
- Colonel Harinder Singh "Billy" Sodhi, VSM - a former commandant and Arjuna Award recipient.
- Colonel Rajinder Kumar Singh "Raj" Kalaan - a former commandant and leading polo player.
- Colonel Ravinder Singh "Pickles" Sodhi, a former commandant and Arjuna Award recipient.
- Colonel Rupinder Singh "R. S." Brar , a former commandant, Arjuna Award recipient and Gold Medalist at the 1982 Asian Games.
- Colonel Bhawani Singh, a former commandant and captain of multiple Indian high goal polo teams.
- Captain Manjinder Singh Bhinder, who died off-duty during the 1997 Uphaar cinema fire while attempting to guide theatregoers to safety.
- Colonel Ravi Rathore, an Indian polo player and an Arjuna awardee. He has been the commandant of the 61st Cavalry and was the highest handicapped polo player in the Indian Army during his era.

== See also ==
- 15th (Imperial Service) Cavalry Brigade
- Battle of Haifa (1918)
