= Ravi Rathore =

Indian polo player

Colonel Ravi Rathore VSM
- Born: 13 June
- Alma mater: National Defence Academy, Pune, India Indian National Academy, Dehradun, India
- Spouse: Dipti Rathore
- Children: 2
- Military career
- Allegiance: India
- Branch: Indian Army
- Rank: Colonel
- Unit: 61 Cavalry
- Commands: 61 Cavalry
- Awards: Arjuna Award, VSM, Maharana Pratap Award

Colonel Ravi Rathore, VSM is a distinguished Indian polo player, former captain of the Indian national polo team, and a decorated officer of the Indian Army. An Arjuna Award recipient, he has achieved a handicap of +5 goals and has been a key figure of the Indian polo team for over two decades. He has played five consecutive FIP World Cup Championships, having Captained two FIP World Cups in 2014, and 2017 and won two golds in 2011 and 2017.

He has been Commandant of the elite and historic 61st Cavalry Regiment of the Indian Army- the only mounted Cavalry regiment globally and also held the position of Honorary Secretary of the Indian Polo Association (IPA).

Recognized internationally, Col. Rathore is an ambassador for the Fédération Internationale de Polo (FIP) and has competed in professional tournaments across more than 30 countries. With over 20 years of service in the Indian Armed Forces, he has been honored with the Vishisht Seva Medal (VSM) and a record 13 Commendation Cards from the Chief of Army Staff and Army Commanders Commendation for his service.

== Honours and decorations ==
Details of Col Ravi Rathore's Polo, academic, and military excellence.

  - 1999 – "Blazer", highest sporting award, National Defence Academy, Pune, India
  - 1999 – "Silver Salver", the award for exceptional excellence in the field of sports, National Defence Academy, Pune, India
  - 2000 – "Blazer", highest sporting award, Indian Military Academy, Dehradun, India
  - 2003 – FIP World Cup Polo Championship Lahore, Pakistan
  - 2006 – Gold Medalist & Most Valuable Player, World Military Games, Nigeria
  - 2007 – FIP World Cup Polo Championship Auckland, New Zealand
  - 2007 – Silver Medal, Fédération Équestre Internationale, (Category A,125)
  - 2011 – Gold Medal (Asia-Africa-Australia Zone)FIP World Cup Polo Championship (Kuala Lumpur, Malaysia)
  - 2011 – FIP World Cup Polo Championship San Luis, Argentina
  - 2011 – Gold Medal- National Equestrian Championship, ( Grade III, 120)
  - 2014 – FIP World Cup Polo Championship Tianjin, China
  - 2014 – World Equestrian Games Deauville, France (Member World Polo Team representing Asia)
  - 2017 – Gold Medal (Asia-Africa Zone) FIP World Cup Polo Championship Tehran, Iran
  - 2017 – FIP World Cup Polo Championship Sydney, Australia
  - 2017 – Maharana Pratap Award, the highest award for sportspersons in Rajasthan
  - 2018 – Arjuna Award, conferred by the President of India, Shri Ram Nath Kovind, for outstanding achievements in Polo
  - 2018-2019 – Vishisht Seva Medal (VSM), awarded by the Indian Armed Forces
  - 13 Commendation Cards – Awarded by the Chief of Army Staff and Army Commanders for exemplary service (year details not specified)
  - Winner – Winner of prestigious championships in India and international tournaments, including:
    - Indian Open National Championship (20 Goal)
    - Northern India Championship (20 Goal)
    - Indian Masters (14 Goal)
    - Sir Pratap Singh Cup (14 Goal)
    - Sirmour Cup (14 Goal)
    - President's Cup
    - International Test Matches
  - Professional Indian Army Courses – Excelled in all professional courses:
    - ‘A’ Grading in Young Officer (YO) (Armoured Corps), first in his regular course
    - ‘AX’ Grading in Instructor Course (Gunnery), 2nd in course
    - Instructor Grading in Junior Command (JC) Course
