= S. S. Rathore =

Indian civil engineer

Satyanarayansinh Shivsinh Rathore (born 1956) is an Indian civil engineer. He belongs to the royal family of Valasna State. He is popularly known as the “highway and canal man of Gujarat”.

== Career ==
Rathore joined the Gujarat Service of Engineers.

He was appointed the CMD of the Sardar Sarovar Narmada Nigam Limited (SSNNL). As the CMD, S.S Rathore completed the Sardar Sarovar dam project which enabled the supply of irrigation and drinking water from the Narmada river, established various canal networks, and is leading the team for the Statue of Unity project. He is credited with developing Gujarat's major highways. He introduced the Build, Operate and Transfer (BOT) road development model, the first of its kind in India. Rathore is the former President of the Institute of Engineers, India, Indian Road Congress, and the Vice-President of the World Federation of Engineering Organization.

He retired in 2014 as its additional chief secretary (ACS). Before becoming ACS, he was the principal secretary.

In 2018, S.S Rathore was honored with the Padma Shri, the fourth highest civilian honor, by Ram Nath Kovind, the President of India.

He is presently (July 2019) appointed as Managing Director (MD) of GMRC (Gujarat Metro Rail Corporation Ltd.).
