= Samira Rathod =

Indian architect and designer

- Education: Sir J. J. College of Architecture; University of Illinois at Urbana-Champaign
- Occupation: Architect
- Partner: Kirti Rathod
- Practice: Don Wald and Associates; Ratan J. Batliboi; Samira Rathod Design Associates

Samira Rathod (born Samira Mehta in 1963) is an Indian architect, furniture designer, writer, and teacher based in Mumbai. She is a Principal of Samira Rathod Design Associates.

== Biography ==
Samira Rathod attended the Sir J. J. College of Architecture in Mumbai and graduated in 1986. Thereafter, she received a Master in Architecture degree from the University of Illinois at Urbana-Champaign in 1988.

Samira Rathod worked for the California firm of Don Wald and Associates on various projects including some for Clint Eastwood. Returning to India, she worked for Ratan Batliboi and then eventually started her own partnership firm in 1995 called RLC. Her 1996 solo furniture exhibition called 'Liasons de Formes' led to a much broader public recognition in India.

In 2000 she started a solo practice called Samira Rathod Design Associates.

In 2008, she founded SPADE, a critical architectural publication with a focus on Indian architecture.

Rathod is an adjunct faculty member at the Kamla Raheja Vidyanidhi Institute for Architecture and Environmental Studies (KRVIA) in Mumbai.

== Work ==
Samira Rathod worked on residential architecture, offices, schools and factories.

- 2010: The Broacha House, Alibag.
- 2012: The Camera House
- 2016: The Acid test (Apartment design), Mumbai
- 2017: The Shadow House, Mumbai, India
- The Bangalore House
- The Mariwalla House
- The Hariharan House
- The Karjat House (designed for Morarka Gannon with a kitchen, dining hall, a living room, bedrooms and 6 bathrooms)
- Mumbai office of retailer Hometown
- 2019 : School of Dancing Arches (with asymmetrical arches), Bhadran, India
- 2022: Dismantling Building: A Kit of Parts at Chemould Prescott Road

The style of Samira Rathod is characterized by playful shapes and eclectic designs. She works with a cohesive approach of interior/exterior, which explains some of her architectural choices.

Exhibitions in which she has participated include a contemporary architecture exhibition at the Jawahar Kala Kendra, Jaipur (February–April 2018), where she exhibited 'A Wall as a Room', and a travelling exhibition, 'The Death of Architecture Circa 2000' (2018), featuring 13 leading Indian architects, in which Rathod's piece 'In the Presence of Absence' explores an almost abandoned town near Vadodara.

== Publications ==
- Samira Rathod, Museum of Trees (2018): a documentation of the 3000 trees of the Byculla Zoo in Mumbai.

== Awards ==
- 2015: Honorable mention for the arcVision Prize - Women and Architecture by the Italcementi Group.
- The Habitat Award for Single Residence Winner's Trophy for The Karjat House
