= Rather Be (disambiguation) =

"Rather Be" is a 2014 single by Clean Bandit featuring Jess Glynne.

Rather Be may also refer to:

== Songs ==
- "Rather Be" (Giveon song), 2025
- "Rather Be" (The Kid Laroi song), 2026
- "Rather Be" (The Verve song), 2008
- "Rather Be", by Benny Benassi featuring Shanell from Electroman, 2011
- "Rather Be", by Big Kenny from Live a Little, 2005
- "Rather Be", by Brandy from B7, 2020

== See also ==
- Rather Be Rockin', 1979 album by Tantrum
- "There's No Place I'd Rather Be", 2007 song by Kit Chan, theme of the National Day Parade
