= Kanji Morarji Rathor =

Kanji Morarji Rathor / Kanzi Morarji Rathore (1913–1989) was a Kutchi industrialist from Raipur, India. He is noted for founding first steel plant of Chhattisgarh.

== Birth ==
He was born to Morarji Karsan Rathor and Mithi Bai on 15 November 1913 at village Khedoi in Princely State of Cutch in small but enterprising Mestri community. His father, who initially worked as a railway contractor and later settled in Raipur and founded Mahakaushal Flour Mills and Raipur Electrical Engineering Co.

== Business career ==
Kanji Morarji started his career in steel industry with M.P. Iron & Steel Works, which was his first venture in to steel business. He had also interest in real estate business and was Partner in Nav Nirman Co. and Nav Sarjan Engineering Co. based at Raipur.

Further, he inherited from his father, who died in 1938, the partnerships in Mahakaushal Flour Mills and Raipur Electrical Engineering Co Also he was Director in Jai Hind Oil Mills of Raipur from 1948 to 1951. He served as a member of Madhya Pradesh Electricity Board Consultative Council for some years.

=== Steel Industry ===
He is noted for founding first steel plant of Chhattisgarh as a joint family venture. In year 1960 he established first steel plant in Chhattisgarh region named Himmat Steel Foundry Limited, which was later made a public limited company in 1980. Himmat Steel was a steel plant manufacturing the special steel casting with an installed capacity at 3000 tonnes having its factory at Kumhari. He served as its chairman since its inception in 1960 till his death in 1989. His younger brother Himmat Morarji Rathor, who was the Managing Director of the company after 1969, was mainly responsible for guiding company for next 2 decades. But after 1989, An expansion programme, could not be executed properly mainly due to uncertain market conditions and non support of the banks. after 1989 Himmat Steel Foundry went into debts and subsequently closed down in year 1998–99, the assets of which were finally auctioned in 2010.

== Public life ==
He was closely associated with Ram Krishna Mission and served as President of Ram Krishna Mission, Raipur unit from 1968 till his death in 1989 and was also responsible for establishment of Ram Krishna Kutir at Amarkantak.

He served as a member of advisory board of Kutch Gurjar Kshatriya Mahasabha, its national and apex body from 1980 till his death in 1989 and was also served as President of Raipur unit of community for years 1968–77.

== Death ==
He died in the year 1989 at Raipur.
