= Tariq Chauhan =

Business executive and entrepreneur

- Born: India
- Occupation: entrepreneur
- Years active: 2009
- Title: CEO of EFSIM Facilities Management Company

Tariq Chauhan is an Indian-born business executive and entrepreneur based in the United Arab Emirates. He is the co-founder and vice chairman of EFS Facilities Services Group and the chief executive officer of EFSIM Facilities Management Company in Saudi Arabia and has been named one of the top CEOs in the Middle East.

== Early life and education ==
Tariq Chauhan was born in India. He completed a Bachelor of Arts degree in economics from Aligarh Muslim University. He later attended executive education programs, including one at Harvard Business School.

== Career ==
Chauhan worked in the banking, technology, and financial services industries before entering the facilities management sector. He later co-founded EFS Facilities Services Group, an integrated facilities management company headquartered in the United Arab Emirates. Chauhan has run the company since 2009, during which time it grew from a regional operations into one operating in 27 countries in the Middle East, Africa, and South Asia.

Chauhan is also the chief executive officer of EFSIM Facilities Management Company, a Saudi Arabia–based entity providing integrated facilities management services.

In 2021, Forbes Middle East ranked Chauhan as one of the top 100 CEOs in the Middle East. In 2025, Construction Business News ranked Chauhan at number 1 in their listing of the Middle East's facilities management "Power 25."

== Other roles ==
In 2025, Chauhan was appointed to the global board of directors of the International Facility Management Association (IFMA). He has also served in advisory and trustee roles with organizations related to workforce development and India–UAE bilateral initiatives. In addition he is involved in philanthropic efforts "supporting education, skills development, and blue-collar community upliftment."

== Publications ==
Chauhan is the author of the book Getting to Resilient Mode, which discusses leadership and organizational management.

== Personal life ==
Chauhan resides in Dubai, United Arab Emirates, with his wife Lovita and their children. Chauhan, who is a Muslim while his wife is a practicing Catholic, has spoken out about the need for more tolerance of interfaith marriages.
