= Siege of Chittorgarh (1567–1568) =

Akbar's conquest of Chittor (1567–1568)

- Part of Mughal–Rajput wars
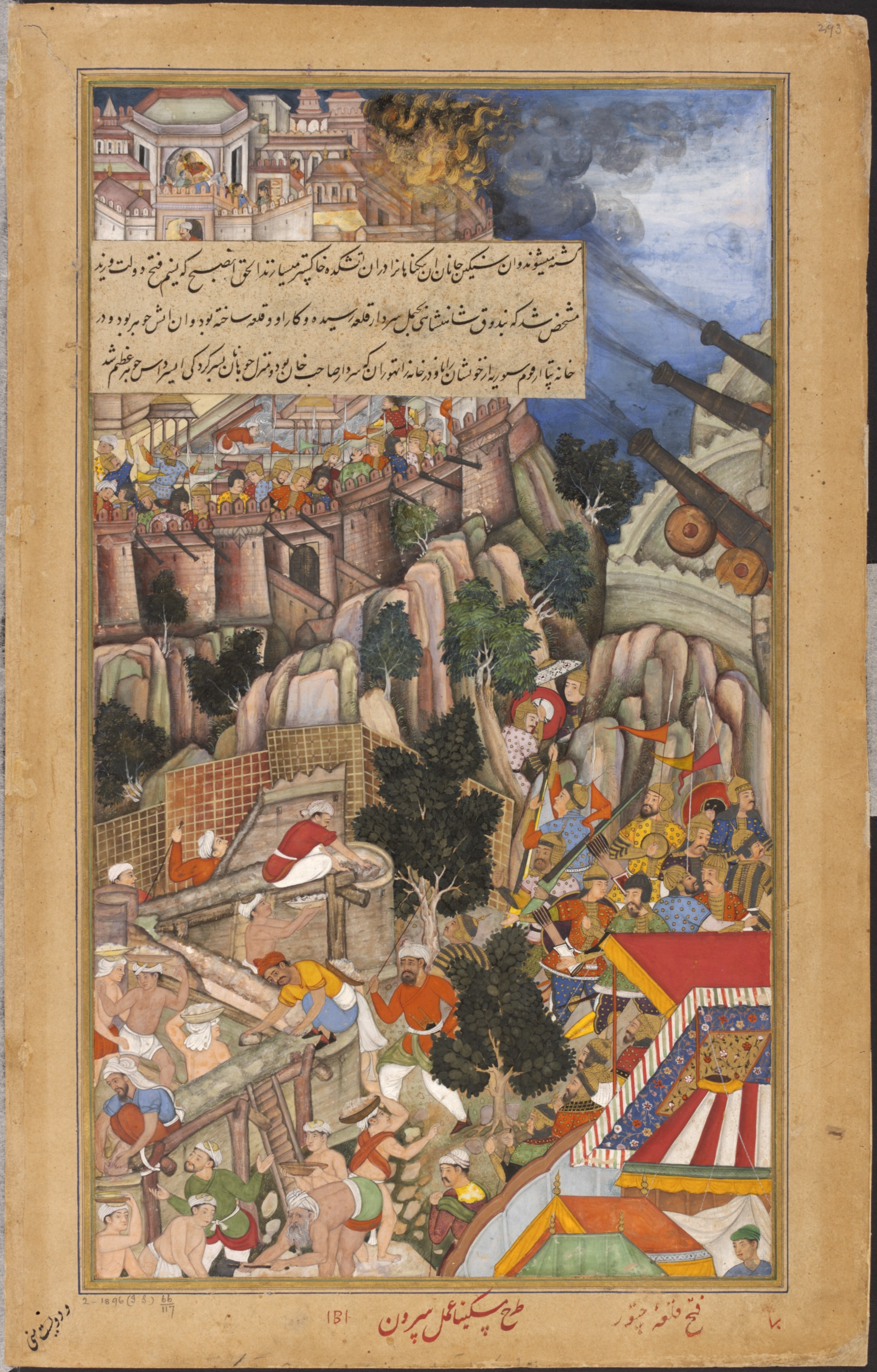
- Miniature painting of a mine exploding during the siege of Chittorgarh in the Akbarnama, c. 1590–95.
Date	23 October 1567 – 23 February 1568 (4 months)
Location	Chittorgarh
Result	Mughal victory
Territorial changes	The Mughal Empire swept into the territories of Sisodias

Belligerents
Mughal Empire	Mewar Kingdom

Commanders and leaders
Akbar; Asaf Khan; Jalal Khan †; Alam Khan †; Quazi Ali Baghdadi †; Adil Khan †; Abdul Majid Khan †; Wazir Khan †; Mir Qasim †; Hussain Quli Khan †; Imteyaz Khan; Syed Jamaluddin Barha †	Jaimal Rathore †; Patta Chundawat †; Ishwar Das Chauhan †; Rawat Sai Das Chundawat †; Kalyan Singh Rathore (Kalla) †; Ballu Solanki †; Dodiya Thakur Sanda †; Rawat Sahibkhan Chauhan †; Raj Rana Surtan Singh Jhala †; Udaibhan †

Strength
80,000+	7,000–8,000 cavalry and musketeers

Casualties and losses
Heavy (around 25,000)	Heavy (8,000)
- 30,000 noncombatants massacred after the battle; Many women and children were enslaved

The siege of Chittorgarh (23 October 1567 – 23 February 1568) was the military expedition of the Mughal Empire under Akbar against the Kingdom of Mewar that commenced in 1567 during which the Mughals successfully captured the fort of Chittorgarh after a hard-pressed siege which lasted for several months.

Akbar under his expansionist policy, besieged the strategic Sisodia capital of Chittor in October 1567 and further gave a religious colour to the struggle by declaring it as a Jihād against the infidels. On Akbar's advance, Sisodia ruler Rana Udai Singh moved to the mountainous principality of his kingdom (on the advice of his war councils) and placed the fort under the command of Jaimal Rathore.

After over four months of seesaw action during which the Mughal forces suffered heavy casualties, the battle eventually broke the deadlock when Jaimal succumbed to a musket shot of Akbar on 22 February 1568. The fort was captured the next morning on the day of Holi after a gallant resistance by the Rajputs. The conquest of Chittor was proclaimed by Akbar as the victory of Islam over infidels.

After the subjugation of the fort, Akbar ordered a general massacre of Chittor's population in the course of which 30,000 Hindu civilians were slaughtered and a large number of women and children were enslaved. Akbar placed the fort under his general Asaf Khan and returned to Agra.

== Background ==
In 1567, Akbar after putting down the revolts of Uzbeks, turned his attention towards the Rajput states of Rajasthan. The Kachhwaha ruler Bharmal already accepted his supremacy by sending his daughter Harka Bai into the Mughal Harem, although all other families except Amber were still hostile towards the Mughals. Thus, Akbar undertook a vigorous expansionist policy to bring them under his sway. Due to the political importance of Chittor for a stable route to Malwa and Gujarat and for further inroads into the Deccan, Akbar advanced with a vast army and artillery from his capital Agra and besieged the fort on 23 October 1567. The contemporary Persian chronicles and his courtiers also blamed Rana Udai Singh for providing refuge to the Afghan rebel Baz Bahadur as a reason of their invasion.

On hearing about Akbar's encroachment into his territory, Udai Singh along with the royal family on the advice of his war councils and ministers fled to the western belt of Mewar in his newly established city of Udaipur. Some later writers accused him of cowardice and being an unworthy heir of Rana Sanga, although no contemporary Persian author gave such an impression. Udai Singh placed the fort under the command of Jaimal Rathore with 8,000 cavalry and some musketeers.

When Akbar learnt of Udai Singh's escape, he dispatched a force under Hussain Kuli Khan towards Udaipur to capture him, although he failed to capture the Rana and returned after plundering Udaipur and its surrounding districts. After the failure of Hussain Quli Khan, Akbar sent another contingent under Asaf Khan to capture Udai Singh. While he too failed to capture the Rana, though, he sacked the wealthy town of Rampura (renamed it Islampur) which guarded the southern flank of Chittor. According to Akbar, the Mughal troops returned with enormous spoils and "sent many worthless infidels to the abode of perdition".

== Siege ==
Initially, the Mughals tried to attack the fortress directly but the citadel was so sturdy that the only options available to the Mughals were to either starve out the occupants of the fort or to somehow reach the walls and sap beneath them. After initial aggressive attempts at reaching the wall failed, Akbar ordered a complement of 5,000 expert builders, stonemasons, and carpenters to construct sabats (approach trenches) and mines to reach the walls. Two mines and one sabat were constructed after significant casualties while three batteries bombarded the fort. A large siege cannon was also cast to breach the walls once the sabat reached the objective.

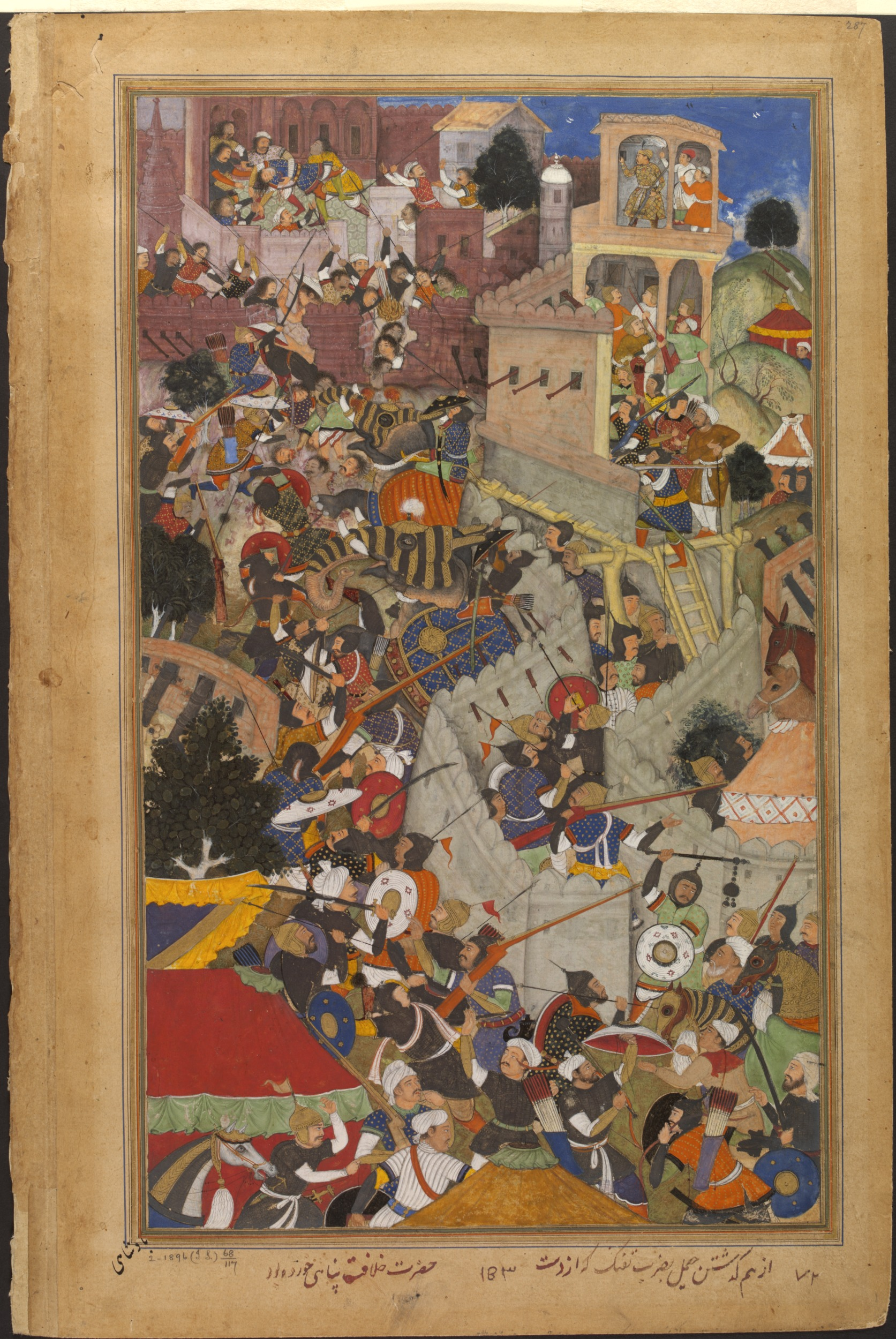
Akbar shoots the Rajput commander, Jaimal, using a matchlock, Akbarnama, 1590–1595

Fifty-eight days after the siege began, the imperial sappers finally reached the walls of Chittorgarh. The two mines were exploded and the walls were breached at the cost of 200 of the assault force. But the defenders soon sealed the opening. Akbar then steadily brought his siege cannon closer to the walls under the cover of the sabat. Finally, on 22 February 1568, the Mughals were able to breach the walls at several locations simultaneously to begin a coordinated assault. While Jaimal was repairing the damage to the fort at night, Akbar killed Jaimal through a musket shot which shattered the morale of the defenders who considered the day lost. (Note: Some Rajput ballads asserted that Jaimal did not die on the spot after Akbar's musket shot, but was killed on the next morning in the final charge. Historian Gaurishankar Hirachand Ojha also concurred with this view. However, the contemporary Rajput and Jain records hold that Jaimal died on the spot. All contemporaneous Mughal sources also asserted that Jaimal died on the spot.)

Rao Jaimal of Badnore and Rao Fatta of Kelwa defended the fort under Maharana Udai Singh II. During the attack, Fatta was a minor, still his mother Karmadevi ordered him to fight in the battle. She then herself participated in the battle along with her daughter Karmavati and daughter-in-law Kamladevi. Karmadevi protected the fort from the rear side with her daughter and daughter-in-law only and were killed in battle.

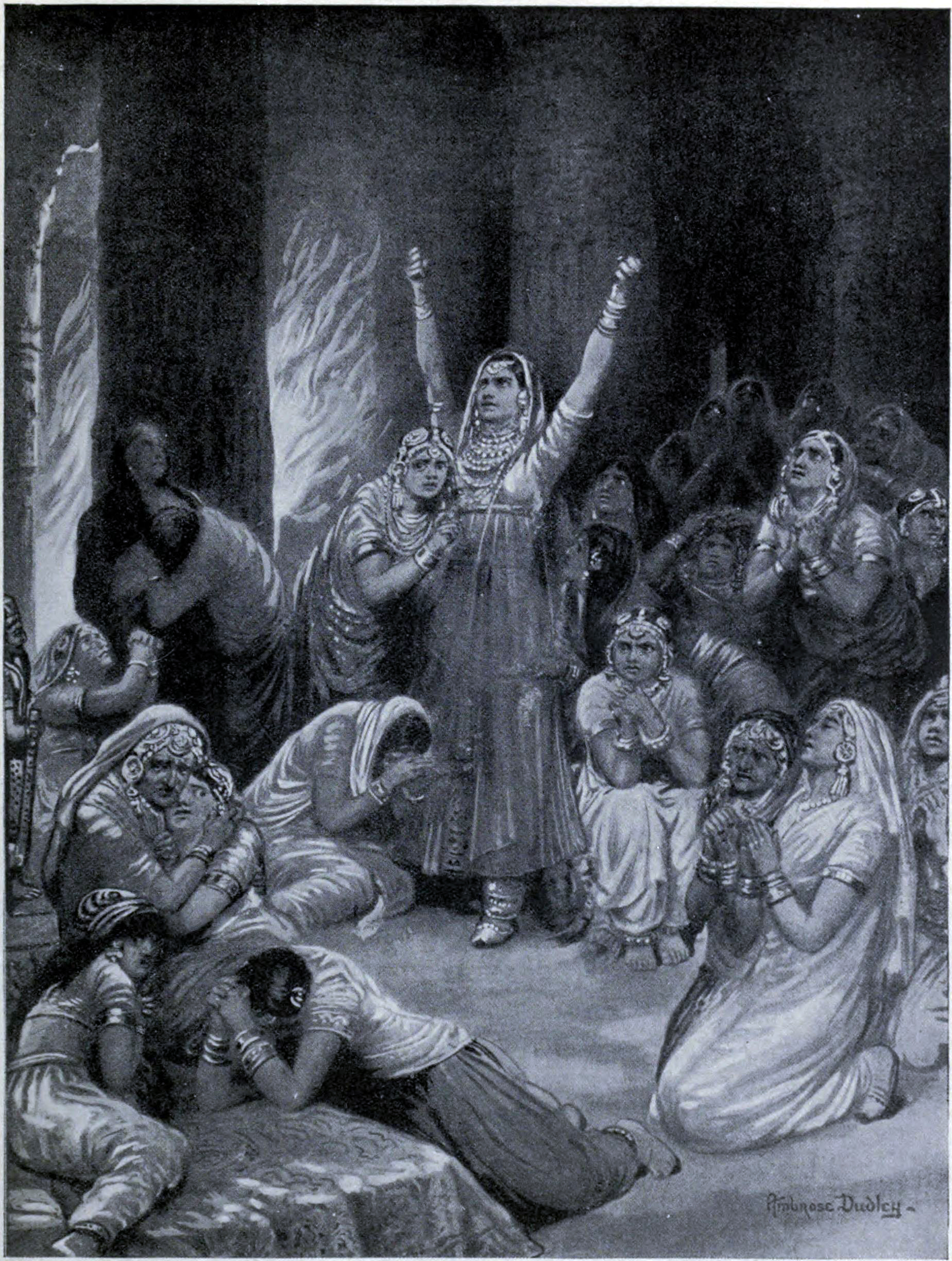
20th century artistic description of the Jauhar ceremony

On the night of 22 February 1568, several Rajput women at various places inside the fort committed Jauhar (self-immolation by fire) to protect their honour from the Mughals. Thus, on 23 February 1568 on the day of the Hindu festival of Holi, the Rajputs dressed in saffron garments and opened the gates for the last stand (Sakha) under the leadership of Patta Chundawat and eventually by night the fort was captured by the Mughals after a gallant resistance.

The siege also resulted in heavy casualties on the Mughal side, where two hundred of them were killed every day. The contemporaneous Persian accounts mentioned several instances during the siege where Akbar himself barely evaded death.

== Aftermath ==
After capturing the fort on 23 February 1568, Akbar ordered a general massacre of Chittor's population in which 30,000 Hindu civilians inside the fort who were largely non-combatants were slaughtered. After the mass slaughter, many women and children were enslaved followed by desecration of many Hindu and Jain temples on Akbar's order.

Akbar who earlier gave a religious colour to the conflict by declaring it as a Jihād, subsequently proclaimed the conquest of the fort as the victory of Islam over infidels. The Mughal soldiers who died in the combat were hailed as Ghazis by Akbar. He also issued a victory letter on 9 March 1568 where he addressed his governors of Punjab about the campaign (quoted by Andre Wink)

We, as far as it is within our power, remain busy in Jihad and owing to the kindness of the superior Lord, who is the promoter of our victories, we have succeeded in occupying a number of forts and towns belonging to the infidels and have established Islam there. With the help of our bloodthirsty sword we have erased the signs of infidelity from their minds and have destroyed temples in those places and also all over Hindustan:-

— Akbar on his conquest of Chittor,

Akbar stayed at Chittorgarh for three days before leaving for the shrine of Moinuddin Chishti (barefooted), as part of his oath to visit the shrine after the conquest of Chittor. Akbar handed the charge of the fort to his trusted general Asaf Khan and returned to Agra.

On returning to Agra, Akbar erected the statues of Jaimal and Patta outside his fort either to honour their doughty resistance or to humiliate them as his doorkeepers. Akbar, also commented upon them in his victory letter. (translated by Ishtiyaq Ahmad Zilli)

Fearful of the approach of the imperial standards he (Udai Singh) left his uncle Sahidas, Jaimal, Udaibhan and Patta who are renowned for their valour among the infidels, may Allah forsake them and lead them to the abode of Perdition, and who are considered to be equal to a thousand horsemen in intrepidity and power:-

— Akbar on Jaimal and Patta in his Fathnama

The violent fate of Chittor turned out to be a watershed in Akbar's conquest of the north Indian plain and in his relations with the Rajput states. The reduction of Chittor, brought almost all of the leading Rajput kingdoms under his sway who were hostile towards him prior to the battle. However, Udai Singh II, the Rana of Mewar, continued to remain at large until his death four years later.

== Traditions ==
The Jauhar of 1568 is a part of the regional legend and is locally remembered on the Hindu festival of Holi (on the day Chittor was sacked) as a day of Chittorgarh massacre by Akbar, with "the red colour signifying the blood that flowed that day".

== In popular culture ==
Mughal conquest of Chittor was part of Sony television series Bharat Ka Veer Putra – Maharana Pratap based on the life of Maharana Pratap. The series depicted the besieging of the fort in over fifty episodes titled Chittor par Sankat.

== See also ==
- Siege of Chittorgarh (1303)

== Bibliography ==
- Ahmad Zilli, Ishtiyaq (1971). "FATHNAMA—I CHITOR, MARCH 1568 AN ANNOTATED TRANSLATION". Proceedings of the Indian History Congress. 33: 350–361. ISSN 2249-1937. JSTOR 44145352.
- Chandra, Satish (1993). Mughal Religious Policies, the Rajputs & the Deccan. Vikas Publishing House. ISBN 978-0-7069-6385-4.
- Chandra, Satish (2005). Medieval India: From Sultanat to the Mughals Part - II (Revised ed.). Har-Anand Publications. ISBN 9788124110669.
- Harlan, Lindsey (2003). The Goddesses' Henchmen: Gender in Indian Hero Worship. Oxford University Press. ISBN 978-0-19-534834-7.
- Khan, Iqtidar Alam (1968). "The Nobility under Akbar and the Development of his Religious Policy, 1560–80". Journal of the Royal Asiatic Society. 100 (1). Cambridge University Press: 29–36. doi:10.1017/S0035869X00126115. JSTOR 25203020. S2CID 159780897.
- Richards, John F. (1995) [1993]. The Mughal empire. New Cambridge history of India. Vol. 5. Cambridge University Press. ISBN 9780521566032.
- Sharma, Gopinath (1962). Mewar and the Mughal Emperors: 1526-1707 A. D. Shiva Lal Agarwala.
- Somani, Ram Vallabh (1976). History of Mewar, from Earliest Times to 1751 A.D. Mateshwari. OCLC 2929852.
- Wink, Andre (2011). "Post Nomadic Empires: From the Mongols to the Mughals". In Peter Fibiger Bang; C.A. Bayly (eds.). Tributary Empires in Global History. Palgrave Macmillan UK. ISBN 978-0-230-30841-1.
