= Kuldeep Singh Garcha =

Indian polo player

Kuldeep Singh Garcha is a notable former polo player of India. He had handicap of five goals and captained and coached the Indian polo team for several years. He was awarded "Arjuna Award" for achieving excellence in sports.

He started playing polo when he joined the Indian Military Academy in Dehradun and became a captain for both the National Defence Academy and the Indian Military Academy.

He joined the Indian army and in 1966 was commissioned as a 2nd Lieutenant into the 61st Cavalry.

Colonel Garcha with his son Satinder has set up the Jaipur Riding and Polo Club on the outskirts of Jaipur.

In 2011 he founded the NGO Aashita in Jaipur, which now takes care of 14 underprivileged children.
