= Hanut Singh =

- Rao Raja
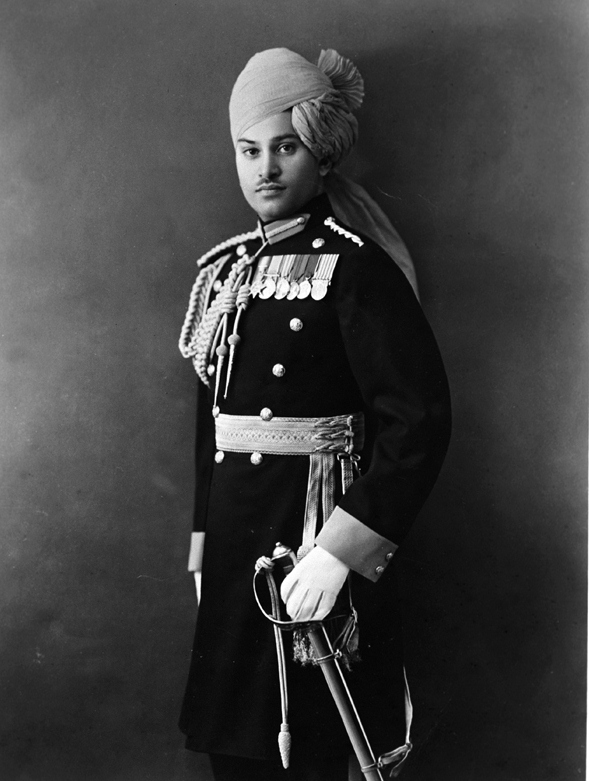
- Born: 20 March 1900; Jodhpur
- Died: 12 October 1982 (aged 82); Jodhpur
- Spouse: Rani Sirey Kanwar of Jaipur; Rani Priya Devi of Sirmur
- Issue: Rajkumari Kalyan Kumari; Rao Raja Bijai Singh; Rao Raja Hari Singh; Rao Raja Daljeet Singh
- Father: Sir Pratap Singh of Idar
- Religion: Hinduism

Rao Raja Hanut Singh (20 March 1900 – 12 October 1982) was a British Indian Army soldier and polo player.

== Biography ==
Hanut Singh was born at Jodhpur on 20 March 1900, the third son of Sir Pratap Singh of Idar. He was educated at Mayo College in Ajmer and at Eastbourne College in Sussex, as well as at the Saumur Cavalry School in France. He served as a Page of Honour to George V at the 1911 Delhi Durbar He was commissioned as a Second Lieutenant in the Jodhpur State Forces in 1914 and commissioned a temporary honorary Second Lieutenant in the British Army in July 1916.

During the First World War, Hanut Singh served with his father, who was one of the seven commanding officers of the 15th Imperial Service Cavalry Brigade that was formed from the Imperial Service Troops provided by various Indian Princely States to aid the British Empire during wartime. Hanut Singh served in France, Palestine and Syria and was a part of the Jodhpur Lancers. He was present at the taking of Haifa and at the fall of Aleppo in 1918. He served in the Egyptian Rebellion of 1919 and was appointed to an honorary Captaincy in the British Army in 1921.

== Post-war ==
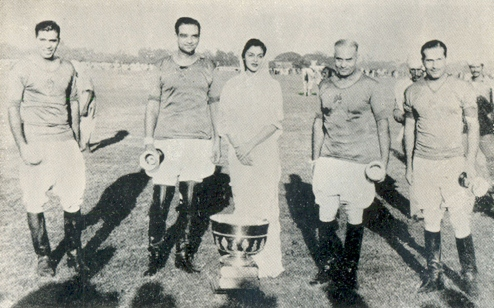
Winners of Indian Polo Championship 1957. L to R – Rao Raja Bijai Singh, HH Maharaja Sawai Man Singh II, Maharani Gayatri Devi, Rao Raja Hanut Singh and Rao Raja Hari Singh

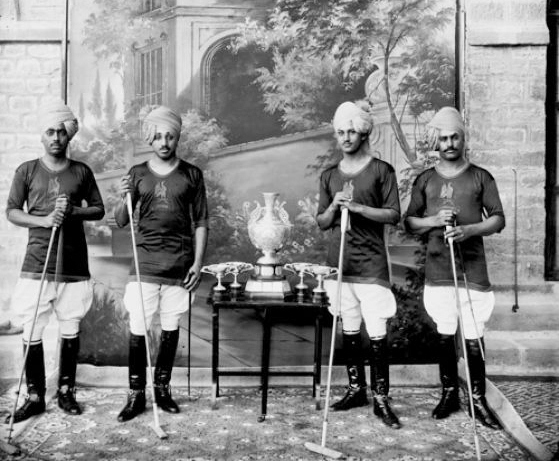
From left to right: Thakur Prithi Singh of Bera, Maharaja Umaid Singh, Rao Raja Hanut Singh e Takhur Ram Singh. Jodhpur 1925.

Until his father, Sir Pratap Singh's death in 1922, Hanut Singh served as his private secretary. From 1923 to 1925, he served as Comptroller of the Royal Household of Jodhpur, then as Officer of the Royal Stables until 1933, when he was promoted to Comptroller of the Royal Stables. In 1934, he was promoted to the rank of Major in the Jodhpur State Forces. He was awarded the title of Rao Bahadur in 1937. In 1941, he was promoted to the rank of Lieutenant-Colonel and became the Military Secretary for Jodhpur, serving until 1948. Hanut Singh was promoted to Colonel in 1946 and to Brigadier in 1947.

An outstanding polo player, he played and won many games for Jodhpur. Later he fielded his own team, Ratanada, with two of his sons, Rao Raja Bijai Singh and Rao Raja Hari Singh. Team Ratanada, won almost every tournament in India for many years.

== Personal life ==
Rao Raja Hanut Singh married twice. His first wife, Rani Sirey Kanwar, was the daughter of HH Maharaja Sawai Madho Singh II of Jaipur. They had three children;

- Rajkumari Kalyan Kumari, who died young.
- Rao Raja Bijai Singh who married Rao Rani Kamal Kumari (Baby) and have two children;
  - Rao Raja Lakshman Singh (Bunny) (b. 1951) married Lata Kaicker. They got divorced, and then in 2004, he married Rao Rani Sharan Kumari (b. 1968). From his first marriage, he has two sons;
    - Kunwar Arjun Singh (b.1981) who married Neha Mansukhani (b. 1983) and has two children;
      - Kumari Nayantara Singh (b. 2016)
      - Kumari Roohi Singh (b. 2019)
    - Kunwar Ranjit Singh (b. 1985) who married Tripti Kankaria (b. 1983) and has one child;
      - Kumari Indira Singh (b. 2019)
  - Rani Harsh Kumari (b.1953) married Raja Chandra Vijay Singh (b.1950) of Sahaspur (div.) they have three children;
    - Rani Uttara Singh Rathore (b.1976) married Maharaj Suryaveer Singh Rathore of Jodhpur (b.1972) and have two children;
      - Rajkumar Samarvir Singh Rathore (b.2001)
      - Rajkumar Hanut Singh Rathore (b.2007).
    - Rajkumari Mallika Kumari Singh (b.1980) who married Kunwar Dhananjai Singh Jamwal (b.1979)and have one child;
      - Kumari Anaheera Singh (b.2013)
    - Rajkumar Surya Vijay Singh (b.1985) married and has two children;
      - Yuvrani Nitya Singh (b.2024)
      - Yuvraj Sumair Singh (b.2025)
- Rao Raja Hari Singh (Harry) married Rao Rani Nawal Kanwar (Jill) and have one child;
  - Rajkumari Serena Kumari (b. 1972) married and has one child;
    - Rajita Singh Kumari (b.1997) who married Jaspal Singh (b. 1990) have 2 children Amalia Kaur (b. 2022) & Rao Raja Asher Adhiraj Singh (b. 2025)

His second wife, Rani Priya Devi, was the daughter of Maharaja Amar Prakash of Sirmur. They had one son;

- Rao Raja Daljeet Singh (Tony), who married Rao Rani Shakti Kumari of Bundi. They have three children;
  - Kunwar Dalpat Singh
  - Kunwar Digvijay Singh married Kunwarani Mahima Rana of Sirmur and have one child;
    - Kunwar Jasmer Singh.
  - Rajkumari Mamta Kumari married Kunwar Naveen Tomar of Dhoori son of Thakur Sahib Brigadier (Vir Chakra) JK Tomar( Meerut)

== Later life ==
From 1949 to 1951, Hanut Singh served as the Minister for Health, Medical and Jails Departments for Rajasthan. In 1958, he was awarded the Padma Bhushan for his achievements and contributions to the game of polo, also receiving the Arjuna Award in 1964. He died at Jodhpur on 12 October 1982, aged 82. He left three sons.

== Honours ==
- Delhi Durbar silver medal – 1911
- 1914 Star
- British War Medal – 1918
- Victory Medal – 1918
- India General Service Medal (1909) – 1919
- Jodhpur Great War Service Medal – 1919
- King George V Silver Jubilee Medal – 1935
- Title of Rao Bahadur – 1937
- King George VI Coronation Medal – 1937
- Jodhpur Victory Medal – 1945
- Indian Independence Medal – 1947
- Padma Bhushan – 1958
- Arjuna Award – 1964
