= Indian Polo Association =

Governing body for polo in India

- Sport: Polo
- Jurisdiction: India
- Membership: 35 affiliate clubs
- Abbreviation: IPA
- Founded: 1892; 134 years ago
- Affiliation: Federation of International Polo
- Headquarters: B Squadron 61 Cavalry, (Cantonment), New Delhi
- President: Gen Manoj Pande
- Secretary: Colonel V S Kahlon, VSM
- Coach: Navjit Singh Sandhu

Official website
- www.ipa.co.in
- (India)

The Indian Polo Association (IPA) is the governing body for polo in India. Most of the IPA's major activities are executed by the 61 Cavalry Unit of the Indian Army. The IPA's registered office is co-located with the 61 Cavalry's B Squadron.

== History ==
The IPA was established in 1892. Legally, it is a non-profit association registered under the Societies Registration Act, 1860. Prominent teams of the pre-World War II period included Alwar, Bhopal, Bikaner, Jaipur, Hyderabad, Patiala, Jodhpur, Kishengarh and Kashmir. The majority of the Cavalry regiments of the British Army and the British Indian Army also fielded teams, the most prominent amongst them were the Central India Horse (CHI), Prince Albert Victor Own Cavalry (PAVO’s Cav), the Inniskilling Dragoon Guards, the 10th Royal Hussars, the 15th Lancers, and the 17/21st Lancers.

The outbreak of the second World War and the mechanization of cavalry units resulted in a decline in interest in Indian polo. The IPA invited the Argentine national polo team to visit India in 1950 and play an exhibition games across the country in a bid to revive interest in the sport. The Argentine team participated in tournaments in Jaipur, Delhi and Bombay. The Pakistan Army polo team visited India in 1955. The IPA also revived the Indian Polo Championship in 1956, after a gap of 17 years. The India national polo team participated in the 1957 World Championship in France and won the tournament. These events helped revive interest in polo in the country. Indian polo received another boost after the Indian Army officially adopted polo as a sport granting access to new grounds and stables of horses.

Indian President Fakhruddin Ali Ahmed consented to be the Patron-in-Chief of the IPA, resulting in the introduction of a new trophy called The President's Cup in 1975. The IPA marked its 100th anniversary in 1992.

In the year 1992 the IPA completed 100 years and since then polo is on an upward trend in the country. Today we have 33 Polo Clubs registered with IPA. Polo has been revived at Leh in Jammu and Kashmir, at Udaipur and Jodhpur in Rajasthan, Hyderabad and Bangalore in South India. Polo is now not only the domain of the Army but a number of corporate and industrial houses are supporting teams in the domestic polo circuit.

The Indian Polo Association has Chief of Army as its President and is the national governing body of Polo in the country. Under the aegis of IPA various tournaments are conducted across all the clubs in India throughout the year.
