= Sanjay Gandhi =

Indian politician (1946–1980)

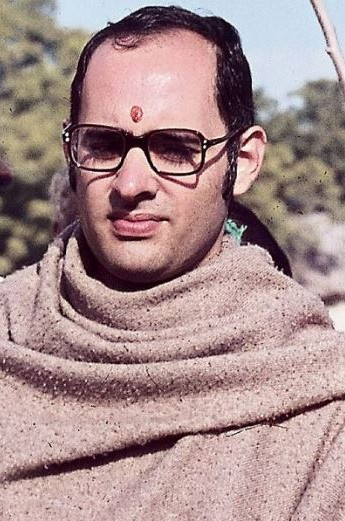

Member of Parliament, Lok Sabha
- In office 18 January 1980 – 23 June 1980
- Preceded by: Ravindra Pratap Singh
- Succeeded by: Rajiv Gandhi
- Constituency: Amethi, Uttar Pradesh

Personal details
- Born: 14 December 1946 Delhi, British India (present-day New Delhi, Delhi, India)
- Died: 23 June 1980 (aged 33) New Delhi, Delhi, India
- Cause of death: Aircraft accident
- Party: Indian National Congress
- Spouse: Maneka Gandhi (m. 1974)
- Children: Varun Gandhi (son)
- Parents: Feroze Gandhi (father); Indira Gandhi (mother)
- Relatives: Rajiv Gandhi (brother); See Nehru–Gandhi family
- Occupation: Politician

Sanjay Gandhi (14 December 1946 – 23 June 1980) was an Indian politician. He was a member of the Lok Sabha and was the younger son of Indira Gandhi and Feroze Gandhi.

During his lifetime, he was widely expected to succeed his mother as head of the Indian National Congress and Prime Minister of India, but following his death in a plane crash, his elder brother Rajiv became their mother's political heir and succeeded her as Prime Minister of India and President of the party after her assassination. His wife Maneka Gandhi and son Varun Gandhi are politicians in the Bharatiya Janata Party.

== Early life and education ==
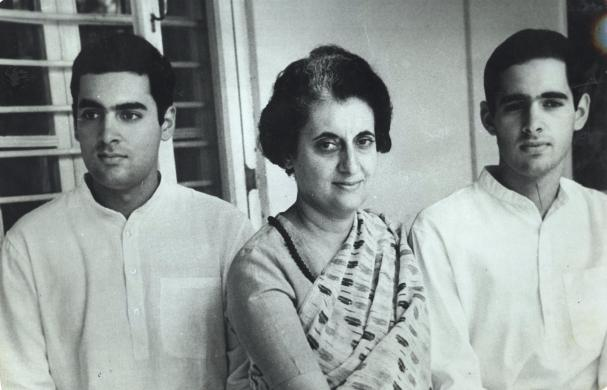
(from left to right) Rajiv Gandhi, Indira Gandhi and Sanjay Gandhi in 1969

Gandhi was born in New Delhi, on 14 December 1946, as the younger son of Indira Gandhi and Feroze Gandhi. Like his elder brother Rajiv, Gandhi was educated at St. Columba's School, Delhi, Welham Boys' School, Dehradun and then at The Doon School, Dehradun. Gandhi was also educated at the Ecole D'Humanité, an international boarding school in Switzerland. Gandhi did not attend university, but he took up automotive engineering as a career and underwent an apprenticeship with Rolls-Royce in Crewe, England for three years. He was very interested in sports cars. In 1976, he obtained a pilot's licence and won several prizes in aerobatics.

== Maruti Motors Limited ==
In 1971, Prime Minister Indira Gandhi's cabinet proposed producing an affordable, locally made car for India's middle class. In June 1971, a company known as Maruti Motors Limited (now Maruti Suzuki) was incorporated under the Companies Act, and Sanjay Gandhi became its managing director despite having no previous experience, design proposals, or links with any corporation. Indira Gandhi faced criticism, but the victory over Pakistan in the 1971 Bangladesh Liberation War shifted public focus. The company did not produce any vehicles during his lifetime. A test model put out as a showpiece to demonstrate progress was criticised. Public perception turned against Gandhi, and many began to speculate about growing corruption. Gandhi then contacted Volkswagen from West Germany for a possible collaboration, transfer of technology and joint production of the Indian version of the "People's Car", to emulate Volkswagen's worldwide success with the Beetle. During the emergency, Gandhi became active in politics and the Maruti project went on the back burner. There were accusations of nepotism and corruption. Finally, the Janata Government came to power in 1977 and "Maruti Limited" was liquidated. A commission was set up by the new government headed by Justice Alak Chandra Gupta which gave a very critical report of the Maruti affair. A year after his death in 1980, and at the behest of Indira, the Union government salvaged Maruti Limited and started looking for an active collaborator for a new company. Maruti Udyog Ltd. was incorporated in the same year through the efforts of Nehru Gandhi family friend and industrial doyen V. Krishnamurthy. The Japanese company Suzuki was also contacted to present the design and feasibility of their car to be manufactured in India. When Suzuki learned that the Government of India had contacted Volkswagen as well, it did everything to pip the German company in the race to produce India's first People's Car (Maruti 800). It provided the government a feasible design of their 'Model 796', which was also successful in Japan and East Asian countries.

== Role during the Emergency ==
In 1974, the opposition-led protests and strikes had caused a widespread disturbance in many parts of the country and badly affected the government and the economy. On 25 June 1975 following an adverse court decision against her, Indira Gandhi declared a national emergency, suspended elections, censored the press and suspended some constitutional freedoms, claiming national security purposes. Non-Congress governments throughout the country were dismissed. Thousands of people, including several Indian independence activists like Jayaprakash Narayan and J. B. Kripalani, who were against the Emergency were arrested.

In the extremely hostile political environment just before and soon after the Emergency, Gandhi rose in importance as Indira's adviser. With the defections of former loyalists, Gandhi's influence with Indira and the government increased dramatically, although he was never in an official or elected position. According to Mark Tully, "His inexperience did not stop him from using the power his mother, Indira, had taken to terrorise the administration, setting up what was in effect a police state."

It was said that during the Emergency, he virtually ran India along with his friends, especially Bansi Lal. It was also quipped that Gandhi had total control over his mother and that the government was run by the PMH (Prime Minister House) rather than the PMO (Prime Minister Office). He "recruited into the party thousands of younger people, who used threats and force to intimidate rivals and those who opposed Mrs Gandhi's authority or his own."

During the emergency, Indira declared a 20-point economic programme for development. Sanjay also declared his own much shorter five points programme promoting:

- Literacy
- Family planning
- Tree Planting
- Eradication of Casteism
- Abolition of dowry

Later during the emergency Sanjay's programme was merged with Indira's 20-point programme to make a combined twenty-five point programme.

Out of the five points, Sanjay is now chiefly remembered for the family planning initiative that attracted much notoriety and caused longterm harm to population control in India.

=== Involvement in politics and government ===
Although he had not been elected and held no office, Sanjay began exercising his newfound influence with Cabinet ministers, high-level government officials and police officers. While many Cabinet ministers and officials resigned in protest, Sanjay reportedly appointed their successors.

In one famous example, Inder Kumar Gujral resigned from the Ministry of Information and Broadcasting when Sanjay attempted to direct the affairs of his ministry and give him orders. Gujral is reported to have angrily rebuked Sanjay and refused to take orders from an unelected person. Gujral was replaced by Vidya Charan Shukla, a Sanjay Gandhi acolyte. In another incident, after popular Bollywood singer Kishore Kumar refused to sing at a function of the Indian Youth Congress, his songs were banned on All India Radio upon Gandhi's insistence.

Sanjay stood for his first election to the Parliament of India following the lifting of the Emergency in March 1977. This election saw the crushing defeat of not only Sanjay in his Amethi Lok Sabha constituency but also the wiping out of Indira's Congress party throughout Northern India. However, Sanjay won Amethi for the Congress(I) in the next general election held in January 1980.

Just one month before his death, he was appointed secretary general of the Congress Party in May 1980.

=== Jama Masjid beautification and slum demolition ===
Sanjay Gandhi and Brij Vardhan, accompanied by Jagmohan the vice-chairman of Delhi Development Authority (DDA), was reportedly irked during his visit to Turkman Gate in old Delhi area that he couldn't see the grand old Jama Masjid because of the maze of tenements. On 13 April 1976, the DDA team bulldozed the tenements. Police resorted to firing to quell the demonstrations opposing the destruction. The firing resulted in at least 150 deaths. Over 70,000 people were displaced during this episode. The displaced inhabitants were moved to a new undeveloped housing site across the Yamuna.

=== Compulsory sterilisation programme ===
In September 1976, Sanjay Gandhi initiated a widespread Compulsory sterilization programme to limit population growth. The exact extent of Sanjay Gandhi's role in the implementation of the programme is somewhat disputed, with some writers holding Gandhi directly responsible for his authoritarianism, and other writers blaming the officials who implemented the programme rather than Gandhi himself. Most notable was Uttawar forced sterilisations on November 6, 1976, when mass vasectomy of nearly 800 men of Uttawar village, Palwal district, Haryana was carried out.

David Frum and Vinod Mehta state that the sterilisation programmes were initiated at the behest of the IMF and the World Bank:

Forced sterilisation was by far the most calamitous exercise undertaken during the Emergency. The IMF and World Bank had periodically shared their fears with New Delhi about the uncontrolled rise in population levels. India’s democracy was a hurdle: no government could possibly enact laws limiting the number of children a couple could have without incurring punishment at the ballot box. But with democracy suspended, the IMF and World Bank encouraged Indira to pursue the programme with renewed vigour. Indira and Sanjay, the self-styled socialists, inflicting on Indians the humiliation of forced sterilisation in order to appease western loan sharks: the irony was lost on them. Socialism, like much else, had been reduced to a slogan.

— David Frum, reviewing The Sanjay Story by Vinod Mehta

=== Attempted assassination ===
Sanjay Gandhi escaped an assassination attempt in March 1977. Unknown gunmen fired at his car about 300 metres south-east of New Delhi during his election campaign.

== Opposition years (1977–1980) ==
After losing the 1977 general election, the Congress party split again with Indira Gandhi floating her own Congress(I) faction. She won a by-election from the Chikmagalur Lok Sabha constituency to the Lok Sabha in November 1978. However, the Janata government's Home Minister, Charan Singh, ordered her and Sanjay arrested on several charges, none of which would be easy to prove in an Indian court. The arrest meant that Indira Gandhi was automatically expelled from Parliament. However, this strategy backfired disastrously. Her arrest and long-running trial gained her great sympathy from many people.

=== "Kissa Kursi Ka" Case ===
Kissa Kursi Ka is a satirical film directed by Amrit Nahata that lampooned Indira Gandhi and Sanjay Gandhi. The film was submitted to the Censor Board for certification in April 1975. The film had lampooned Sanjay Gandhi's car manufacturing plans, besides Congress supporters like Swami Dhirendra Brahmachari, private secretary to Indira Gandhi R. K. Dhawan, and Rukhsana Sultana. The board sent the film to a seven-member revising committee, which further sent it to the Government. Subsequently, a show-cause notice raising 51 objections was sent to the producer by the Information and Broadcasting ministry. In his reply submitted on 11 July 1975, Nahata stated that the characters were "imaginary and do not refer to any political party or persons". By the time, the Emergency had already been declared.

Subsequently, all the prints and the master-print of the film at Censor Board office were confiscated and brought to the Maruti factory in Gurgaon where they were burned. The subsequent Shah Commission, established in 1977 by the Janata party-led Government of India, to enquire into excesses committed in the Indian Emergency found Sanjay guilty of burning the negative, along with Vidya Charan Shukla, Minister of Information and Broadcasting during the emergency. The legal case ran for 11 months, and the court gave its judgment on 27 February 1979. Both Sanjay Gandhi and Shukla were sentenced to a two-year plus a month prison sentence. Sanjay Gandhi was denied bail. In his judgment, District Judge, O. N. Vohra at Tis Hazari in Delhi, found the accused guilty of "criminal conspiracy, breach of trust, mischief by fire, dishonestly receiving criminal property, concealing stolen property and disappearance of evidence". The verdict was later overturned.

=== Support for Charan Singh ===
The Janata coalition under prime minister Morarji Desai was only united by its disdain for Indira Gandhi's authoritarianism. The party included right wing Hindu Nationalists, Socialists and former Congress party members. With little in common, the Morarji Desai government was bogged down by infighting. In 1979, the government started to unravel over the issue of dual loyalties of some members to Janata and the RSS. The ambitious Union Finance minister, Charan Singh, who as the Union Home Minister during the previous year had ordered arrest of Gandhi, took advantage of this and started courting different Congress factions including Congress (I). After a significant exodus from Janata party to Charan Singh faction, Morarji Desai resigned as prime minister in July 1979. Charan Singh was appointed prime minister, by President Reddy, after Indira and Sanjay promised Singh that Congress(I) would support his government from outside on certain conditions. The conditions included dropping all charges against Indira and Sanjay. Since Charan Singh refused to drop the charges, Congress withdrew its support and President Reddy dissolved Parliament in August 1979.

Before the 1980 elections Gandhi approached the then Shahi Imam of Jama Masjid, Syed Abdullah Bukhari and entered into an agreement with him on the basis of 10-point programme to secure the support of the Muslim votes. In the elections held in January, Congress returned to power with a landslide majority.

== 1980 Indian elections ==
The Congress(I) under Gandhi swept to power in January 1980. Elections soon after to legislative assemblies in States ruled by opposition parties brought back Congress ministries to those states. Sanjay Gandhi at that time selected his own loyalists to head the governments in these states.

== Personal life ==
Gandhi married Maneka Anand, who was 10 years his junior, in New Delhi on 24 September 1974. Their son, Varun, was born shortly before Gandhi's death. According to Maneka, Sanjay wanted to raise his children in the Zoroastrian faith of his paternal family.

== Death ==
At 8:10 a.m. on 23 June 1980, Gandhi lost control of his aeroplane while performing an aerobatic manoeuvre and crashed in the Diplomatic Enclave of New Delhi. Captain Subhash Saxena, the only other passenger, also died. Gandhi's body was recovered and cremated as per Hindu rituals.

== Family ==
Nehru-Gandhi family tree

Gangadhar Nehru (1827–1861)
Nandlal Nehru	Motilal Nehru (1861–1931)	Swarup Rani Thussu (1868–1938)
Shyamlal Nehru	Uma Nehru (1884–1963)	Brijlal Nehru (1884–1964)	Rameshwari Raina (1886–1966)	Jawaharlal Nehru (1889–1964)	Kamala Kaul (1899–1936)	Vijaya Swarup Nehru (1900–1990)	Ranjit Sitaram Pandit (1893–1944)	Krishna Nehru (1907–1967)
Shyam Kumari Nehru (1904–1980)	Anand Kumar Nehru	Braj Kumar Nehru (1909–2001)	Magdolna Friedmann (1908–2017)	Indira Priyadarshini Nehru (1917–1984)	Feroze Jehangir Gandhi (1912–1960)	Nayantara Pandit (b. 1927)	Ajit Gunottam Hutheesing (1936–2017)
Arun Kumar Nehru (1944–2013)	Sonia Maino (b. 1946)	Rajiv Ratna Gandhi (1944–1991)	Sanjay Gandhi (1946–1980)	Maneka Anand (b. 1956)	Gita Sahgal (b. 1957)	Ravi Ajit Hutheesing (b. 1971)
Rahul Rajiv Gandhi (b. 1970)	Priyanka Gandhi (b. 1972)	Robert Vadra (b. 1969)	Feroze Varun Gandhi (b. 1980)
