= Arun Nehru =

Indian politician and columnist (1944–2013)

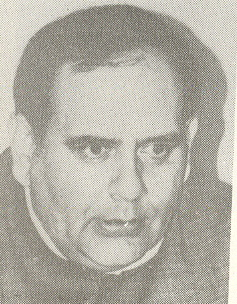

Member of Parliament, Lok Sabha
- In office 2 December 1989 – 21 June 1991
- Preceded by: Jagdish Awasthi
- Succeeded by: Shyam Bihari Misra
- Constituency: Bilhaur, Uttar Pradesh
- In office 18 January 1980 – 2 December 1989
- Preceded by: Raj Narain; Indira Gandhi (vacated)
- Succeeded by: Sheila Kaul
- Constituency: Rae Bareli, Uttar Pradesh

Minister of Commerce and Tourism
- In office 6 December 1989 – 10 November 1990
- Prime Minister: Vishwanath Pratap Singh
- Preceded by: Vishwanath Pratap Singh
- Succeeded by: Chandra Shekhar

Personal details
- Born: Arun Kumar Nehru; 24 April 1944 Lucknow, United Provinces, British India
- Died: 25 July 2013 (aged 69) Gurgaon, Haryana, India
- Party: Indian National Congress (until 1989); Janata Dal (from 1989)
- Spouse: Subhadra Nehru
- Children: 2
- Relatives: Uma Nehru (grandmother); Shyam Kumari Khan (aunt); See Nehru-Gandhi family
- Occupation: Politician; columnist

Arun Kumar Nehru (24 April 1944 – 25 July 2013) was an Indian politician and columnist. He was a member of the 9th Lok Sabha, elected from Bilhaur, as a Janata Dal leader. Earlier, he was member of the 7th and 8th Lok Sabhas from Rae Bareli on an Indian National Congress ticket. In his political career, Nehru served in various ministerial positions, including serving as the Minister of State for Home Affairs from September 1985 to October 1986. A member of the Nehru–Gandhi family, Nehru was noted in the media to be the second most powerful person in the Indian government during his tenure as Minister of State for Home Affairs, after his cousin Rajiv Gandhi, who was then Prime Minister of India. Nehru was also a member of the V. P. Singh cabinet.

== Early life and background ==
Arun Nehru was born on 24 April 1944. His father was Anand Kumar Nehru, a member of the Nehru-Gandhi family. He studied at La Martinière Boys College, Lucknow, and Lucknow Christian College.

== Career ==
He worked as a businessman for 17 years before entering into politics. He was president of the paint firm Jenson and Nicholson at the time when Prime Minister Indira Gandhi persuaded him to change career. However, he rose to prominence after Sanjay Gandhi's death. The business community regarded him as a decisive person and even termed him as "one-window clearance". When his cousin Rajiv Gandhi forayed into politics in 1981, Nehru became his key advisor. Following Indira Gandhi's assassination in 1984, Nehru played a key role in ensuring Rajiv Gandhi's appointment as Prime Minister by persuading then-President of India, Zail Singh, to appoint Rajiv Gandhi as Prime Minister before he was even elected as the party leader. Nehru also contributed to development of the Special Protection Group.

As a representative of the Indian National Congress (INC), Nehru was a Member of Parliament in the 7th Lok Sabha (1980–84) and the 8th Lok Sabha (1984–89) from Rae Bareli. He was the Union Minister of State for Energy (December 1984—September 1985) and for Home Affairs (September 1985—October 1986) in the 10th ministry of India. Later, he left the INC for Janata Dal and was elected to the 9th Lok Sabha from Bilhaur in 1989, where he was the Union Minister for Commerce and Tourism (December–November 1990). Nehru was also noted in the media to be one of the most powerful members of the V.P. Singh government and he also helped form Singh's government.

He was also a member of various committees - Railway Convention Committee (1980–84), Consultative Committee, External Affairs and Science and Technology, 7th Lok Sabha; Member, Consultative Committee, External Affairs (1987–89).

== Controversies ==
=== Role in the 1984 anti-Sikh riots ===
As originally reported by The Caravan Magazine, Arun Nehru reportedly played a pivotal role in the 1984 Sikh Genocide. The riots broke out after the Assassination of Indira Gandhi. According to then petroleum secretary Avtar Singh Gill, Rajiv Gandhi 's "errand boy", Lalit Suri informed him at the eve of the massacre that Arun Nehru gave "clearance" for the killings in Delhi. His strategy was to "catch Sikh youth, fling a tyre over their heads, douse them with kerosene and set them on fire." He further retorted, "This will calm the anger of the Hindus".

=== Czech pistol case ===
During his tenure as Minister of State in the Home Ministry from 1985 to 1986, he was allegedly involved in the Czech pistol case, where a deal with the Czechoslovak firm Merkuria Foreign Trade Corp had resulted in a loss of around ₹2.5 million (US$27,000). A 20-year investigation by the Central Bureau of Investigation (CBI) led to submission of a report in 2007. This found no incriminating evidence. The trial court, however, rejected the CBI report and found Nehru's involvement enough to continue the proceedings. In March 2013, the Supreme Court stayed those proceedings, based on the report.

== Personal life ==
Nehru married Subhadra Nehru in 1967, and they had two daughters, Radhika and Avantika. He has 3 grandsons. Akhil Madan, Yash Madan and Vickram Tikkoo. He died on 25 July 2013 in Gurgaon.

Nehru-Gandhi family tree

Gangadhar Nehru (1827–1861)
Nandlal Nehru | Motilal Nehru (1861–1931) | Swarup Rani Thussu (1868–1938)
Shyamlal Nehru | Uma Nehru (1884–1963) | Brijlal Nehru (1884–1964) | Rameshwari Raina (1886–1966) | Jawaharlal Nehru (1889–1964) | Kamala Kaul (1899–1936) | Vijaya Swarup Nehru (1900–1990) | Ranjit Sitaram Pandit (1893–1944) | Krishna Nehru (1907–1967)
Shyam Kumari Nehru (1904–1980) | Anand Kumar Nehru | Braj Kumar Nehru (1909–2001) | Magdolna Friedmann (1908–2017) | Indira Priyadarshini Nehru (1917–1984) | Feroze Jehangir Gandhi (1912–1960) | Edward Nirmal Mangat Rai (1915–2003) | Nayantara Pandit (b. 1927) | Ajit Gunottam Hutheesing (1936–2017)
Arun Kumar Nehru (1944–2013) | Sonia Maino (b. 1946) | Rajiv Ratna Gandhi (1944–1991) | Sanjay Gandhi (1946–1980) | Maneka Anand (b. 1956) | Gita Sahgal (b. 1957) | Ravi Ajit Hutheesing (b. 1971)
Rahul Rajiv Gandhi (b. 1970) | Priyanka Gandhi (b. 1972) | Robert Rajendra Vadra (b. 1969) | Feroze Varun Gandhi (b. 1980)
