= Ajit Hutheesing =

American businessman (1936–2017)

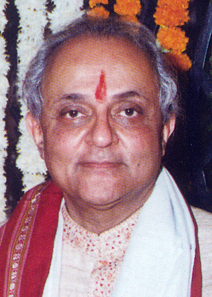
- Born: 4 March 1936; Bombay, British India
- Died: 8 December 2017 (aged 81); United States
- Occupation: Businessman
- Spouses: Amrita Nigam (m. 1960; div. 1984) Helen Armstrong (m. 1996; died 2006)
- Children: 3, including Ravi
- Mother: Krishna Hutheesing
- Relatives: See Nehru–Gandhi family and Hutheesing family

Ajit Gunottam Hutheesing (4 March 1936 – 8 December 2017) was the founder, chairman and chief executive officer of International Capital Partners Inc. (ICP). ICP commenced investment activities in 1992, providing private placement equity to finance the growth of successful smaller companies. After a successful record of investments in small private and public companies, ICP began winding down its activities. Hutheesing was a member of the Greenwich Roundtable, a group of 100 invited members who collectively manage $1 trillion plus.

== Early life and education ==
Hutheesing was an Indian American. He was born in Mumbai, India into the prominent Hutheesing family. His mother, Krishna, a well-known author, was the sister of India's first Prime Minister, Jawaharlal Nehru. His father, Gunottam Hutheesing, was part of one of the larger industrial families in India, the Lalbhai Group; he served India as a politician, journalist and businessman.

Hutheesing was educated at the Scindia School in Gwalior and later at the St. Mary's School in Mumbai, before he attended the Cambridge University in England where he received his bachelor's degree in chemistry, physics, metallurgy and mathematics and a master's degree in chemical engineering. He received his MBA from Columbia Business School in New York.

== Career ==
Hutheesing was one of the first Indians in Wall Street when he started his investment banking career in 1960 with Loeb, Rhoades & Co. In 1962, he joined S.G. Warburg & Company in London as part of his investment banking training. He returned to India in 1963 to start the first investment bank but when his cousin, Indira Gandhi, became Prime Minister and started nationalising banks and insurance companies, he decided to leave India.

Following the advice and introduction of Sir Siegmund Warburg, Chairman of S.G. Warburg & Company, he joined the International Finance Corporation (IFC), the private sector investment banking arm of the World Bank in 1965. He spent 10 years at IFC during most of which he headed IFC's investment activities in the southern cone countries of South America. In 1972 he became the youngest director of IFC (at that time) heading the department responsible for management, syndications and dispositions of its rapidly growing equity and loan portfolios representing over 200 investments worldwide and valued in 1975 at $900 million.

In 1975, at the invitation of an old friend, James D. Wolfensohn, then President and CEO of Schroders USA (ex-President of the World Bank), Hutheesing joined J. Henry Schroder Corporation (JHSC), New York, as its managing director and as Director of Schroder International. JHSC was the investment banking arm of Schroders PLC in the US Its main activities were M&A, private placements and managing a venture capital pool. Hutheesing spent considerable time in Brazil developing business for Schroders. He was named vice-chairman of J. Henry Schroder Corporation in 1982.

He joined The Sherwood Group, New York, in 1986 as chairman to help the company raise substantial new capital and to build its corporate finance capabilities. Sherwood (later National Discount Brokers bought by Deutsche Bank) was one of the major wholesale market makers in the over-the-counter market and an underwriter and distributor of securities to the retail sector of the investment industry. While at Sherwood, Hutheesing was the only non-American Chairman of a Wall Street investment banking and securities trading company. Upon the death of the founder and majority shareholder, Hutheesing presided over the sale of Sherwood and left the company in February 1988, to start ICP.

During his life, Hutheesing was committed to using his connections in and knowledge of India and the United States to build both philanthropic and business bridges between these countries. On the investment front, his interest was to bring private equity capital to India from the United States and to eventually channel capital from high-net-worth families in India to the United States.

== Personal life ==
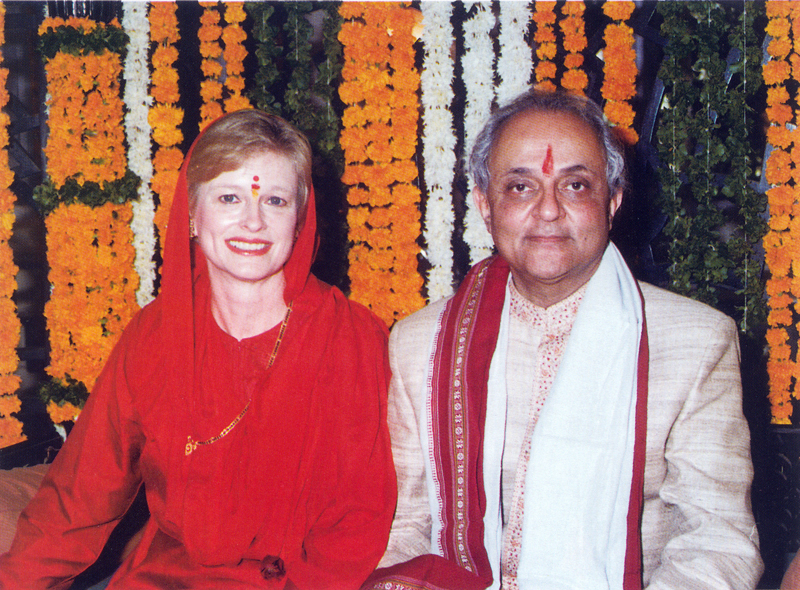
Armstrong and Hutheesing at their wedding, 1996

Hutheesing married Amrita Nigam in 1960 in London. They had three children together: sons Nikhil, Vivek and Ravi. The family lived in Arlington and McLean, Virginia between 1965 and 1975 before moving to Greenwich, Connecticut. Their marriage ended in a divorce in 1984. Amrita Hutheesing died in 2015, aged 77.

In 1996, Hutheesing married Helen Armstrong, a violinist. Armstrong was the founder and artistic director of Armstrong Chamber Concerts in Washington, Connecticut, and a graduate of the Juilliard School of Music, from which she also received a master's degree. She died in 2006 at the age of 63. In her memory Hutheesing wrote the memoir The Shadow of Her Smile. Hutheesing was diagnosed with idiopathic pulmonary fibrosis, before he died on 8 December 2017, aged 81.

Nehru-Gandhi family tree

Gangadhar Nehru (1827–1861)
Nandlal Nehru	Motilal Nehru (1861–1931)	Swarup Rani Thussu (1868–1938)
Shyamlal Nehru	Uma Nehru (1884–1963)	Brijlal Nehru (1884–1964)	Rameshwari Raina (1886–1966)	Jawaharlal Nehru (1889–1964)	Kamala Kaul (1899–1936)	Vijaya Swarup Nehru (1900–1990)	Ranjit Sitaram Pandit (1893–1944)	Krishna Nehru (1907–1967)
Shyam Kumari Nehru (1904–1980)	Anand Kumar Nehru	Braj Kumar Nehru (1909–2001)	Magdolna Friedmann (1908–2017)	Indira Priyadarshini Nehru (1917–1984)	Feroze Jehangir Gandhi (1912–1960)	Nayantara Pandit (b. 1927)	Ajit Gunottam Hutheesing (1936–2017)
Arun Kumar Nehru (1944–2013)	Sonia Maino (b. 1946)	Rajiv Gandhi (1944–1991)	Sanjay Gandhi (1946–1980)	Maneka Anand (b. 1956)	Gita Sahgal (b. 1957)	Ravi Ajit Hutheesing (b. 1971)
Rahul Rajiv Gandhi (b. 1970)	Priyanka Gandhi (b. 1972)	Robert Vadra (b. 1969)	Feroze Varun Gandhi (b. 1980)
