= Hutheesing family =

Jain family from Gujarat, India

- Current region: Gujarati, India
- Connected families: Nehru-Gandhi family

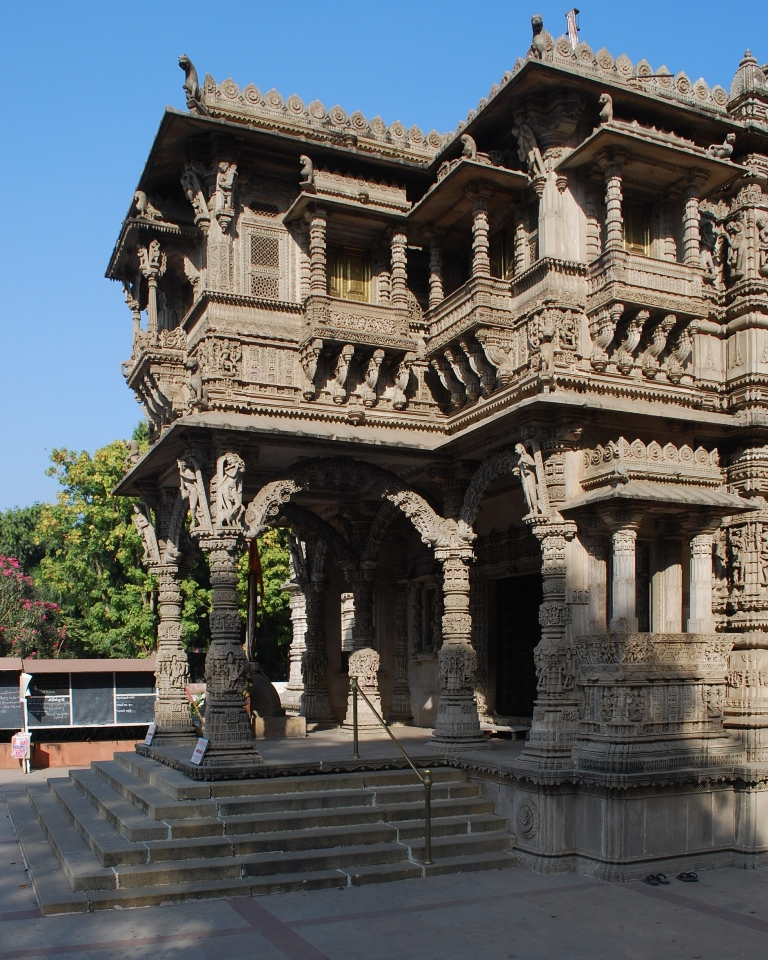
Hutheesing Jain Temple

The Hutheesing family (Gujarati: હઠીસિંહ) is a Jain family from the city of Ahmedabad in Gujarat, India. Several temples and charitable institutions in Ahmedabad have been built or founded by members of this mercantile family. Krishna Hutheesing, the sister of Jawaharlal Nehru, was a member of this family by marriage.

== History ==
The family has a known history of over 250 years. In the mid-1700s, the progenitors of the Hutheesing family were among a wave of immigration of the Jain trading community from Osian in the Marwar region of Rajasthan to Khambhat (Cambay) in Gujarat to access maritime trade.

The immigrants soon became the owners of a few ships that sailed abroad for trade. However, the group from Osian became involved in certain intrigues and the Mughal authorities consequently confiscated their ships. They were unable to carry on their trade in the atmosphere of suspicion and hostility, and they abandoned direct involvement with international trade and moved inland to the large trading city of Ahmedabad, which was ruled by a rival (albeit Mughal-appointed) satrap. Here they became traders.

=== Sheth Hutheesing ===
In Ahmedabad, the community prospered in trade. In particular, Hutheesing, son of Kesarising and grandson of one of the emigrants of Oslan, amassed a large fortune. He lived during the first half of the 19th century. His descendants (both adopted and biological) took his first name as their surname and came to be known as the "Hutheesing family".

Hutheesing Kesarising was married three times but neither his first wife nor his second wife produced a living male heir, although there were at least two living daughters, one boy who lived to the age of five, and miscarriages and other infant deaths. His third wife, named Harkunwar Bai, from the village of Ghogha near Bhavnagar, was much younger than him. They did not have children for several years after their marriage. The two daughters were married at a young age, per the custom of that era, and sent away to live in their marital homes. By keeping the Indian tradition, the couple adopted the three sons of Hutheesing's brother, Dolabhai. The boys were named Jaisingbhai, Maganbhai and Mulchandbhai. A couple of years after the adoptions, Bai became pregnant and gave birth to a son, whom they named Umabhai.

According to Jain custom and society, their biological son was treated just like his adopted brothers. Before his death, Hutheesing portioned out his wealth in equal measure to all his sons, and at his death, the eldest adopted boy, Jaising, officiated at his funeral as his eldest son.

=== Harkunwar Bai and descendants ===
After the death of Sheth Hutheesing, his sons carried on the family's trading business and Bai, devoted herself to prayer and charities. The entire family continued to live together in their palatial residence, the Hutheesing-ni-Vadi, which was a massive haveli (Indian-style mansion-with-courtyards) built by Huteesing just outside the gates of the old walled city of Ahmedabad. The mansion stood within a large compound, which contained walled gardens, an orchard, mews and small houses for servants and dependents.

Hutheesing had intended to build a Jain temple within this compound. Before his death, Hutheesing and Bai had performed the required religious ceremonies and jointly laid the symbolic "first stone" of the temple. Hutheesing had finalized the layout and plan of the temple and was in the process of arranging finances and engaging craftsmen. After his death, Bai supervised the construction of the 52nd Jinalaya Hutheesing Jain Temple. The temple took several years to be built. It is constructed of stone in the traditional way, without steel, cement or mortar. It houses 238 stone images, 83 metal images and 21 yantras. The Pratishtha (consecration) of the temple was conducted by Shantisagar Suri, a famous saint. The festivities were attended by as many as 400,000 people.

When the temple was almost completed, Bai decided that a Derasar, or Jain monastery, should be built in the city, which would accommodate visitors during the consecration of the temple and thereafter serve as a centre of the Jain faith. Her sons agreed, and they built and endowed the Dharmanath Derasar; its consecration was held a couple of days before the consecration of the temple. The is situated in the Nisha Pol precinct of Ahmedabad, in the near vicinity of the Hutheesing temple.

Harkunvar Bai, who had been much younger than her husband, lived to old age. After the death of her husband, as a pious Indian widow, she wore only plain white cotton sarees for the rest of her life, entirely gave up all jewelry and ornamentation, and spent a large portion of her waking hours in prayer. She later built two further temples, on a smaller scale, within one kilometer from her house in Ahmedabad. These are the Sambhavnath and Chintamani Parshvanath temples in the Zaveriwad neighbourhood of Ahmedabad. She commissioned the construction of a Gaushala or animal shelter for aged cattle and other animals. She constructed Piaos and Sada-varta shelters near certain Jain temples, where basic food, cool water and a shady shelter were provided free to pilgrims and devotees. She constructed and endowed a Dharamshala, or free pilgrims' inn, at Samet Shikhar, a center of Jain pilgrimage located in distant Jharkhand. She organized and funded pilgrimages for poor Jain families of Ahmedabad to travel to Samet Shikhar. She donated funds towards building the Ahmedabad Civil Hospital. She also built a school for girls— the Maganlal Karamchand Girls' School in Ahmedabad in 1850, when the general public was still not in favor of female education. Her pious charities, good works and personal austerity made her a figure of veneration among the people of Ahmedabad.

The family trade included wooden furniture in association with Lockwood de Forest, which was a rage in the US then, and kundan jewellery to Tiffany's in the US.

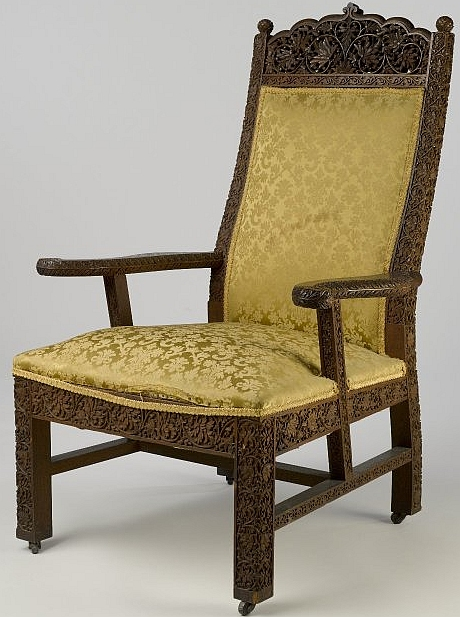
Armchair Designer: Lockwood de Forest, Maker: Ahmedabad Wood Carving Company, Teak, Made: Ahmedabad, ca. 1895, Brooklyn Museum

Ahmedabad Wood Carving Company was set up in 1881 by an American interior decorator, Lockwood de Forest, in association with Maganbhai Hutheesing to export wooden furniture, carved doors, cabinets, picture frames etc.

The family became known for its marital alliances. They are related to the Kasturbhai Lalbhai family as well as Jawaharlal Nehru. Krishna Nehru Hutheesing was married to Gunottam P. Hutheesing, (nicknamed Raja).

Purushottam Hutheesing's other son Surottam P. Hutheesing was a noted industrialist and served as Chairman of Ahmedabad Textile Mill's Association's President for a year from 1954–55. He was the first to invite noted architect, Le Corbusier to India, who later did many works in India. The Mill Owners' Association Building and Villa Shodhan were the works assigned to him by Surottam Hutheesing

Ahmedabad's main art venue, Leila & Purushottam Hutheesing Visual Art Centre, as well as the Purshottambhai Maganbhai & Leila P Hutheesing Public Charitable Trust is named after Maganbhai's son Purshottambhai. He was married to Leila (Dahiben), the daughter of Lalbhai Dalpatbhai, and the sister of Kasturbhai Lalbhai. Purushottam Hutheesing's son Gunottam was married to Jawaharlal Nehru's sister, Krishna Nehru Hutheesing. But in 1946 Raja Gunottam Hutheesing (INC) lost his first electoral bid for the Nagpada-Kamathipura BMC election constituency to an independent Linganna Pujari (1914-1999). Pujari subsequently joined the Congress Party in 1947 at Nehruji's invitation.

Gunottam's sister Shrimati was married to Saumyendranath Tagore, the grandnephew of Rabindranath Tagore. Shrimati had studied at Shantiniketan and had remained associated with it. Saumendranath Tagore became one of the founders of the Communist movement in India.

Rajiv Gandhi, later a prime minister of India, was born in Mumbai at the home of his uncle and aunt, Gunottam (Raja) and Krishna Hutheesing, while his parents were guests at their home located at 20th Carmichael Road in Bombay.

Ajit Hutheesing (1936–2017), the son of Gunottam, also lived in the home and spent many years living with Nehru in his home in Delhi. He later migrated to the US in the early 1960s and became one of the first Indians on Wall Street when he started his investment banking career. He was married to the American violinist Helen Armstrong from 1996 till her demise in 2006. He had three sons, Nikhil, Vivek and Ravi, and three grandchildren, Kirin Hutheesing, Remy Hutheesing and Mirai Hutheesing.

== Family tree ==
- Kesarising, who married Surajba
  - Dolabhai Kesarising
  - Hatheesing Kesarising, who married Harkunwar Bai and two others
    - Jaisingbhai, Maganbhai and Mulchandbhai (adopted from Dolabhai); Umabhai from Harkunwar
      - Maganlal Hutheesing
        - Purushottam Hutheesing, who married Leila (Dahiben), daughter of Lalbhai Dalpatbhai and Mohini, and the sister of Kasturbhai Lalbhai
          - Sarvottam Hutheesing
            - Deepak Hutheesing, who married Daksha
              - Umang Hutheesing
              - Urvi Hutheesing
            - Janak Hutheesing, who married Nina
              - Shaum Hutheesing, named after Shaumyendranath Tagore
            - three daughters
          - Gunottam (Raja) Hutheesing, who married Krishna Nehru (1907–1967), daughter of Motilal Nehru and Swarup Rani Nehru, See Nehru-Gandhi family
            - Harsha Hutheesing
            - Ajit Hutheesing (1936-2017), who married Amrita Nigam (m. 1960 – div. 1987), Helen Armstrong (m. 1996 – died 2006)
              - Nikhil, Vivek and Ravi Hutheesing (born 1971) with Amrita, stepchild Debbie Howser with Helen, and son David Cohen with Helen
                - Kirin Hutheesing, Remy Hutheesing and Mirai Hutheesing
          - Shrimati Hutheesing, who married Saumyendranath Tagore, a nephew of Rabindranath Tagore, See Tagore family

== See also ==
- Ajit Hutheesing
- Ravi Hutheesing
- Villa Shodhan
