= Raj Kaul =

Indian Sanskrit and Persian scholar

Pandit Raj Kaul
- Born: Raj Kaul; Kashmir
- Occupation: Scholar

Academic work
- Institutions: Old Delhi
- Main interests: Translation

Raj Kaul, according to the Nehru family tradition, was an Indian Sanskrit and Persian scholar from Kashmir, who had been recruited in 1716 by the then Mughal Emperor, Farrukhsiyar (1683 – 1719), to move to Old Delhi, where he settled near a canal and came to be known with a hyphenated Kaul-Nehru, with Nehru evolving from the word nehar, meaning canal. He was later noted as the earliest known member of the Nehru-Gandhi family. As a result, several Nehru member biographies generally begin with Kaul's story.

== Tradition ==
According to Braj Kumar Nehru, records of the Nehru family prior to when they fled Delhi in 1857, were either lost or destroyed. In his autobiography, Braj Kumar is told by Kashmiri history scholar, Mohammad Yousuf Taing, that Farrukhsiyar never went to Kashmir. Though, according to Braj Kumar, he may have heard of Kaul's reputation and therefore called for him. In Taing's opinion, the name Nehru must have been attached to the family before the migration to Delhi, or else the name would have been feminised to "Nehri". Sir Walter Lawrence, author of The Valley of Kashmir and who studied the villages of Kashmir, told Braj Kumar that Nehru may have been "Nahru" from one particular village in the Kashmir Valley. The traditional story of Raj Kaul as a Kasmiri Brahmin pandit, is recited in Katherine Frank's biography of Indira Gandhi titled Indira: The Life of Indira Nehru Gandhi,, and Walter Crocker's biography of Jawaharlal Nehru titled Nehru: A Contemporary's Estimate (1966), both of which are cited from Jawaharlal Nehru's autobiography titled An Autobiography. That the name derived from the village of Naru in the Badgam part of Kashmir, according to Shashi Tharoor in his 2003 biography of Nehru, Nehru: The Invention of India, "has never been conclusively established". Tharoor recalls the traditional story, explaining that the many Kaul's that migrated from Kashmir at that time, typically did so as scholars.
