= Nehru–Gandhi family =

Indian political dynasty

- Political family
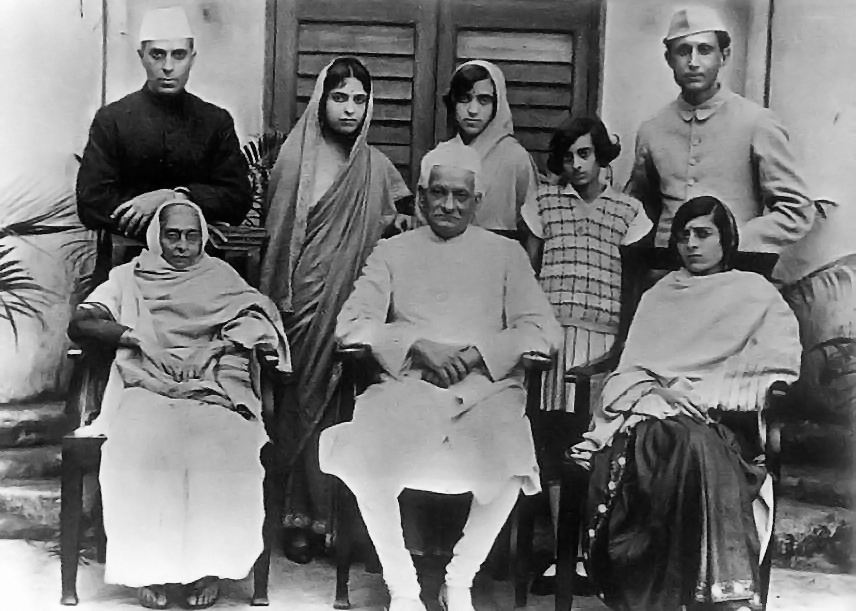
- Family photo of 1927. Standing (left to right): Jawaharlal Nehru, Vijaya Lakshmi Pandit, Krishna Hutheesing, Indira Nehru (later Gandhi), Ranjit Sitaram Pandit. Seated: Swarup Rani Nehru, Motilal Nehru, Kamala Nehru.
- Current region: Delhi, India
- Origin: Kashmir, India (Nehru family); Bharuch, Gujarat, India (Gandhi family)
- Members: Motilal Nehru, Swarup Rani Nehru, Brijlal Nehru, Rameshwari Nehru, Jawaharlal Nehru, Vijaya Lakshmi Pandit, Uma Nehru, Krishna Hutheesing, Indira Gandhi, Braj Kumar Nehru, Nayantara Sahgal, Feroze Gandhi, Rajiv Gandhi, Sanjay Gandhi, Arun Nehru, Sonia Gandhi, Maneka Gandhi, Rahul Gandhi, Priyanka Vadra, Varun Gandhi, Robert Vadra
- Distinctions: Political prominence within the Indian National Congress

The Nehru–Gandhi family is an Indian political family that has occupied a prominent place in the politics of India. The involvement of the family has traditionally revolved around the Indian National Congress, as various members have traditionally led the party. Three members of the family—Jawaharlal Nehru, Indira Gandhi and Rajiv Gandhi—have served as the prime minister of India, while several others have been members of parliament (MP). The family is not related to but only named in honor of Mahatma Gandhi.

The Guardian wrote in 2007, "The Gandhi brand has no peer in the world—a member of the family has been in charge of India for 40 of the 60 years since independence. The allure of India's first family blends the right to rule of British monarchy with the tragic glamour of America's Kennedy clan."

== Family tree ==
Chart illustrating the Nehru-Gandhi Family Tree

Nehru-Gandhi family tree

Gangadhar Nehru (1827–1861)
Nandlal Nehru	Motilal Nehru (1861–1931)	Swarup Rani Thussu (1868–1938)
Shyamlal Nehru	Uma Nehru (1884–1963)	Brijlal Nehru (1884–1964)	Rameshwari Raina (1886–1966)	Jawaharlal Nehru (1889–1964)	Kamala Kaul (1899–1936)	Vijaya Swarup Nehru (1900–1990)	Ranjit Sitaram Pandit (1893–1944)	Krishna Nehru (1907–1967)
Shyam Kumari Nehru (1904–1980)	Anand Kumar Nehru	Braj Kumar Nehru (1909–2001)	Magdolna Friedmann (1908–2017)	Indira Priyadarshini Nehru (1917–1984)	Feroze Jehangir Gandhi (1912–1960)	Edward Nirmal Mangat Rai (1915–2003)	Nayantara Pandit (b. 1927)	Ajit Gunottam Hutheesing (1936–2017)
Arun Kumar Nehru (1944–2013)	Sonia Maino (b. 1946)	Rajiv Ratna Gandhi (1944–1991)	Sanjay Gandhi (1946–1980)	Maneka Anand (b. 1956)	Gita Sahgal (b. 1957)	Ravi Ajit Hutheesing (b. 1971)
Rahul Rajiv Gandhi (b. 1970)	Priyanka Gandhi (b. 1972)	Robert Rajendra Vadra (b. 1969)	Feroze Varun Gandhi (b. 1980)

=== Earliest record ===
- Raj Kaul (late 1600s to early 1700s) a Kashmiri Pandit. He is the earliest recorded ancestor of the Nehru family. He is believed to have moved from Kashmir to Delhi in 1716 AD. A Jagir with a house situated on the banks of a canal was granted to Raj Kaul, and, from the fact of this residence, 'Nehru' (from Nahar, a canal) came to be attached to his name. Kaul was the original family name; this changed to Kaul-Nehru; and, in later years, Kaul was dropped out and the family name became only "Nehru".
- During the early part of the 19th century, Gangadhar Nehru's father, Lakshmi Narayan Nehru, worked as a clerk in Delhi for the East India Company. Lakshmi Narayan Nehru was the son of Mansa Ram Nehru who was the son of Vishwanath Kaul Nehru who in turn was the son of Raj Kaul.

=== First generation ===
- Gangadhar Nehru (1827–1861), a direct descendant of Raj Kaul. He was the last Kotwal of Delhi (equivalent to Chief of Police), prior to the Indian Rebellion of 1857. He was the father of freedom fighter Motilal Nehru and grandfather of Jawaharlal Nehru who was the first prime minister of India, thus part of the Nehru family.

=== Second generation ===
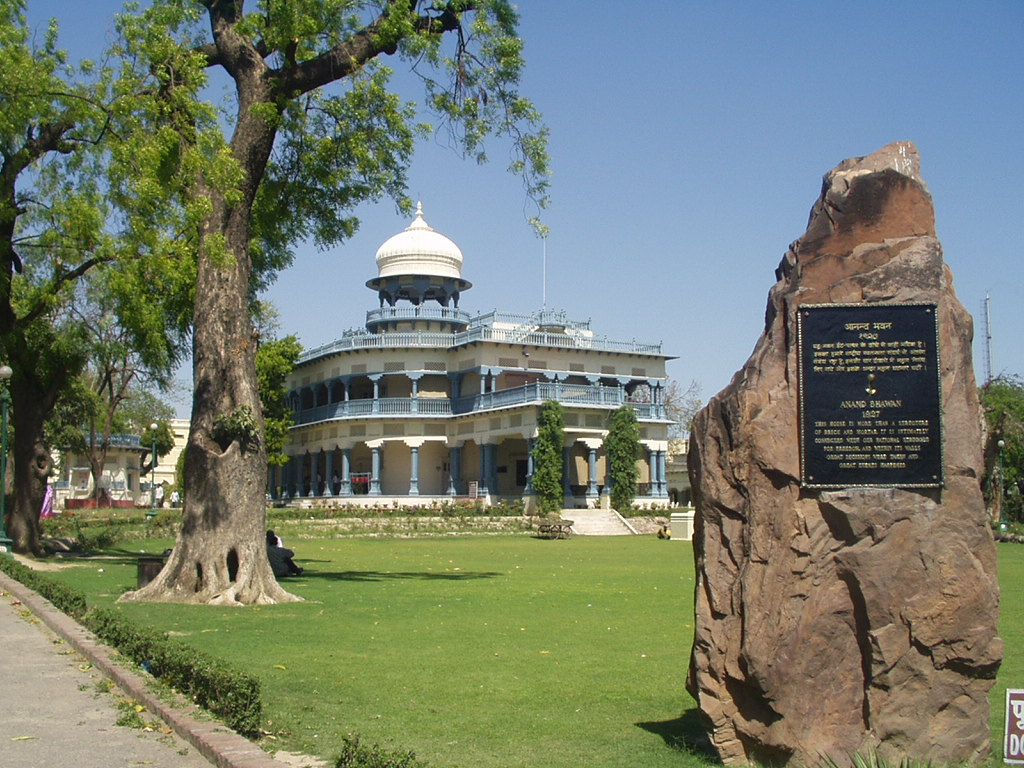
Anand Bhavan, ancestral home of the Nehru-Gandhi Family, bought by Motilal Nehru in Allahabad in the 1930s, now a museum.

- Bansi Dhar Nehru, Gangadhar's eldest son. He worked in the judicial department of the British Government and, after being appointed successively to various places, was partly cut off from the rest of the family.
- Nandlal Nehru (1845–1887), older brother of Motilal Nehru. He was the Diwan (prime minister) of the princely state of Khetri in Rajputana.
- Motilal Nehru (1861–1931), patriarch of Nehru–Gandhi family. He was a lawyer and a prominent leader of the Indian independence movement. He also served as the president of Congress twice, 1919–1920 and 1928–1929.
- Swarup Rani Nehru (1868–1938), wife of Motilal Nehru. She played a prominent role in India's freedom movement in the 1920s–30s as an advocate of civil disobedience against the British Raj and its salt laws.

=== Third generation ===
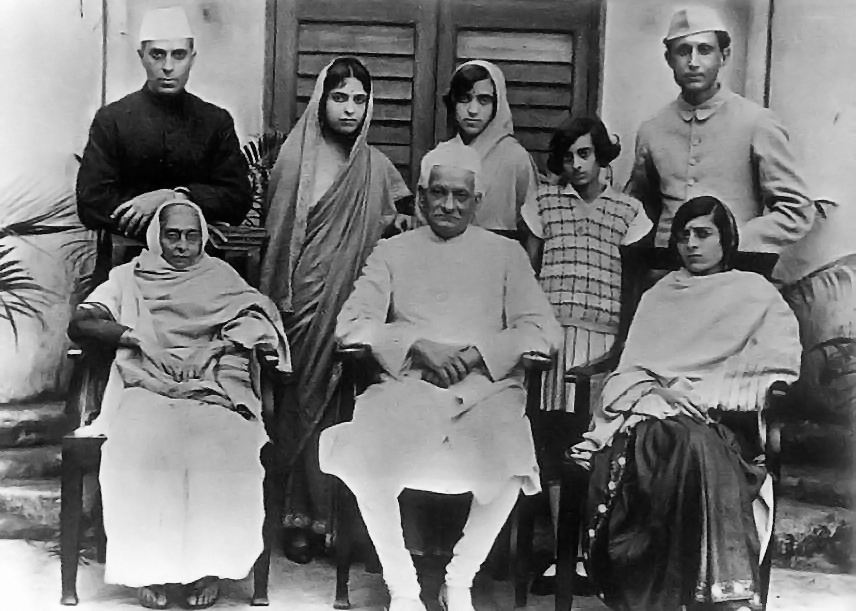
Nehru family, standing (L to R) Jawaharlal Nehru, Vijaya Lakshmi Pandit, Krishna Hutheesing, Indira Gandhi and Ranjit Sitaram Pandit; Seated: Swaroop, Motilal Nehru and Kamala Nehru (circa 1927)

- Jawaharlal Nehru (1889–1964), son of Motilal Nehru. He was the first prime minister of India and was one of the most prominent leaders of the Indian independence movement. He had succeeded his father as president of the Congress in 1929.
- Vijaya Lakshmi Pandit (1900–1990), eldest daughter of Motilal Nehru. She was an Indian diplomat and politician who later became the president of the United Nations General Assembly. Married Ranjit Sitaram Pandit in 1921.
- Krishna Nehru Hutheesing (1907–1967) was an Indian writer, the youngest sister of Jawaharlal Nehru and Vijaya Lakshmi Pandit, and part of the Nehru–Gandhi family.
- Kamala Nehru (1899–1936), wife of Jawaharlal Nehru. She was a prominent social reformer and was an active member of the All India Congress Committee.
- Brijlal Nehru (1884–1964), son of Nandlal Nehru and a nephew of Motilal Nehru. He was the Finance Minister of the princely state of Jammu and Kashmir during the rule of Maharaja Hari Singh.
- Rameshwari Nehru (1886–1966), wife of Brij Lal Nehru. She was a journalist and social worker who co-founded All India Women's Conference
- Uma Nehru (1884–1963) was an Indian independence activist and politician. She married Shamlal Nehru, cousin of Jawaharlal Nehru.

=== Fourth generation ===
- Indira Gandhi (1917–1984), only daughter of Jawaharlal Nehru. She became the first woman prime minister of India.
- Feroze Gandhi (1912–1960), husband of Indira. He was a politician and journalist.
- Braj Kumar Nehru (1909–2001), son of Brijlal Nehru. He served as the Indian diplomat and ambassador to the United States and as High Commissioner to the United Kingdom. He later served as Governor of several Indian states and was an adviser to his cousin Indira Gandhi.
- Magdolna Nehru (1908–2017), nicknamed Fori, wife of Braj Kumar Nehru.
- Balwant Kumar Nehru (1916–1996), son of Brijlal Nehru and brother of Braj Kumar Nehru. Engineer and corporate manager who rose to become the deputy chairman of ITC and the president of the All-India Management Association.
- Harsha Hutheesing (1935–1991) and Ajit Hutheesing (1936–2017), sons of Krishna Nehru Hutheesing and Raja Hutheesing
- Nayantara Sahgal (born 10 May 1927), the second of the three daughters born to Vijaya Lakshmi Pandit
- Ratan Kumar Nehru (1902–1981), civil servant and diplomat, son of Mohanlal Nehru, grandson of Nandlal Nehru.
- Shyam Kumari Khan (1904–1980), daughter of Uma Nehru she was an Indian lawyer, freedom fighter, politician and social worker. She was a member of the Rajya Sabha from 1963 to 1968. She married Abdul Jamil Khan.

=== Fifth generation ===
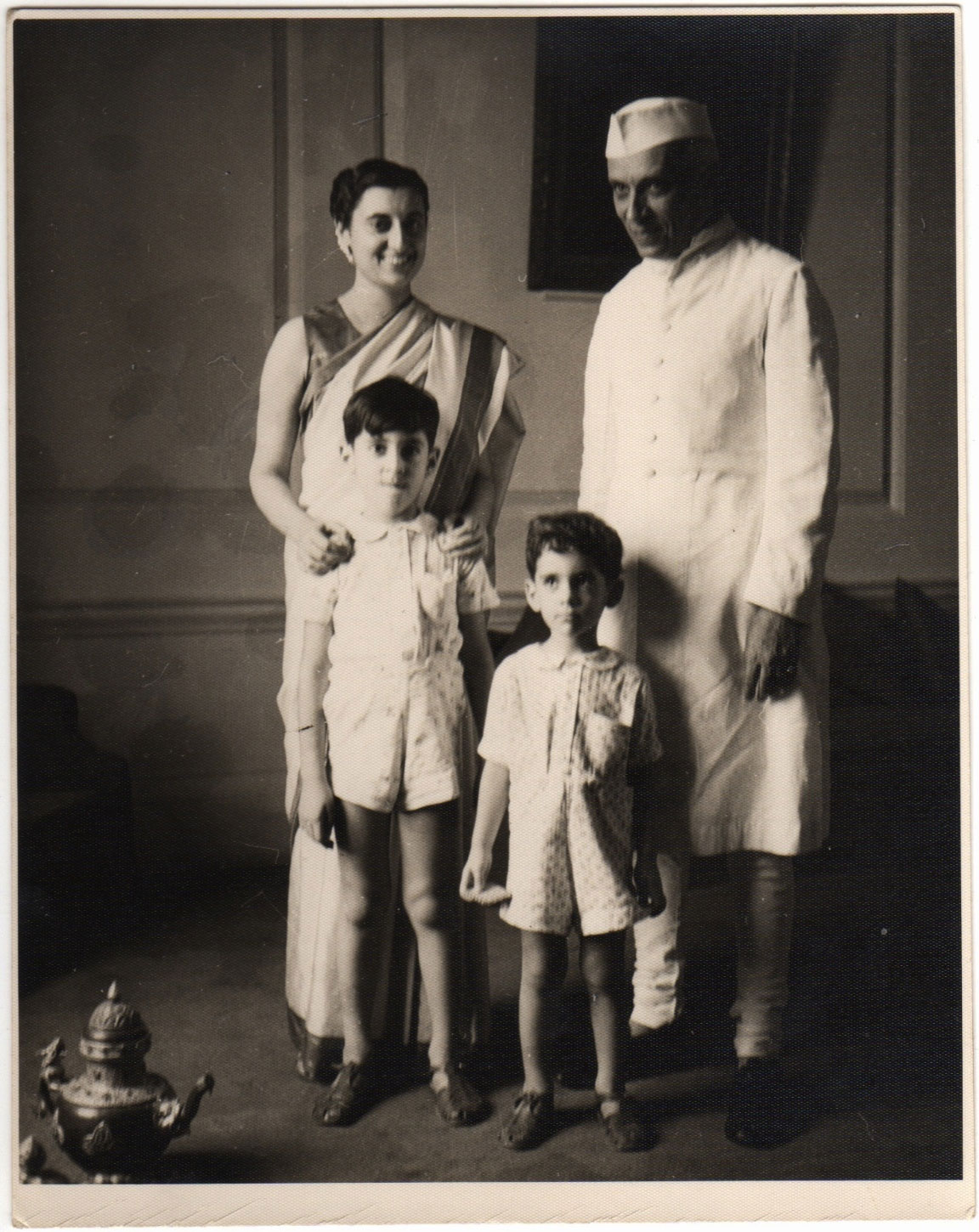
Indira Gandhi, Jawaharlal Nehru, Rajiv Gandhi and Sanjay Gandhi (circa 1949).

- Arun Nehru (1944–2013), great-grandson of Nandlal Nehru. He was a politician and union minister during the 1980s.
- Rajiv Gandhi (1944–1991), eldest son of Indira and Feroze Gandhi. He became the 6th prime minister of India after Indira's death.
- Sanjay Gandhi (1946–1980), second son of Indira. He was also one of the most trusted lieutenants of his mother during the 1970s and was widely expected to succeed his mother as prime minister of India, but met with an untimely death in a plane crash.
- Sonia Gandhi (née Maino 1946), widow of Rajiv Gandhi. She was born in Italy and took Indian citizenship, 11 years after marrying Rajiv Gandhi. She was the president of the Indian National Congress from 1998 to 2017, from 2019 to 2022 and has served as the Chairperson of the United Progressive Alliance from 2004 until 2023.
- Maneka Gandhi (née Anand 1956), widow of Sanjay Gandhi. She is a noted environmentalist and animal welfare activist. She is a prominent member of the Bharatiya Janata Party. She has served as a cabinet minister in four government. She also served as the Indian Union Cabinet Minister for Women & Child Development in the BJP led Government of 2014–2019.
- Vikram Nehru (born 1952), third son of Balwant Kumar Nehru. Entered the field of international development with a career at the World Bank. Became the World Bank's Chief Economist and Director for Poverty Reduction, Economic Management, Private and Financial Sector Development for East Asia and the Pacific. Subsequently, became the chair in Southeast Asian Studies at the Carnegie Endowment for International Peace in Washington, D.C., and then Distinguished Practitioner-in-Residence at the Johns Hopkins University School of Advanced International Studies.

=== Sixth generation ===
- Rahul Gandhi (born 1970), son of Rajiv Gandhi and Sonia Gandhi. He was the president of the Congress party from 2017 and 2019, and was a member of Parliament from Amethi, UP from 2004 to 2019. He was the Chairman of the Congress coordination panel for 2014 Lok Sabha polls and the current MP from Rae Bareli, Uttar Pradesh in the Lok Sabha. He is the current Leader of the Opposition in Lok Sabha.
- Priyanka Gandhi (born 1972), daughter of Rajiv Gandhi and Sonia Gandhi. She is a member of Lok Sabha, the lower house of Parliament of India, representing the Wayanad constituency from 2024 to the present, and is a General Secretary of the Indian National Congress. Priyanka is married to Robert Vadra, a businessman.
- Robert Vadra (born 1969), is an Indian entrepreneur, and the husband of Priyanka Gandhi.
- Varun Gandhi (born 1980), son of Sanjay Gandhi and Maneka Gandhi. He is a member of the Bharatiya Janata Party, National Executive and the youngest National Secretary in the history of the party. He is a member of Lok Sabha, the lower house of Parliament of India, representing the Sultanpur constituency from 2014 to 2019 and Pilibhit constituency from 2009 to 2014 and from 2019 to 2024.

== Gallery ==
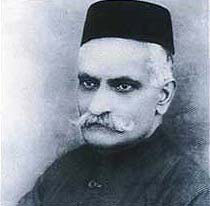
Motilal Nehru

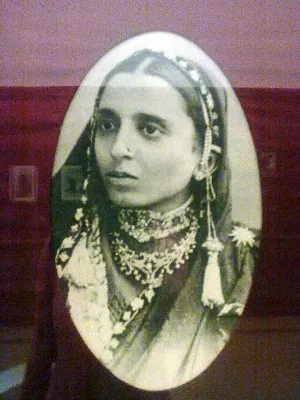
Swarup Rani Nehru

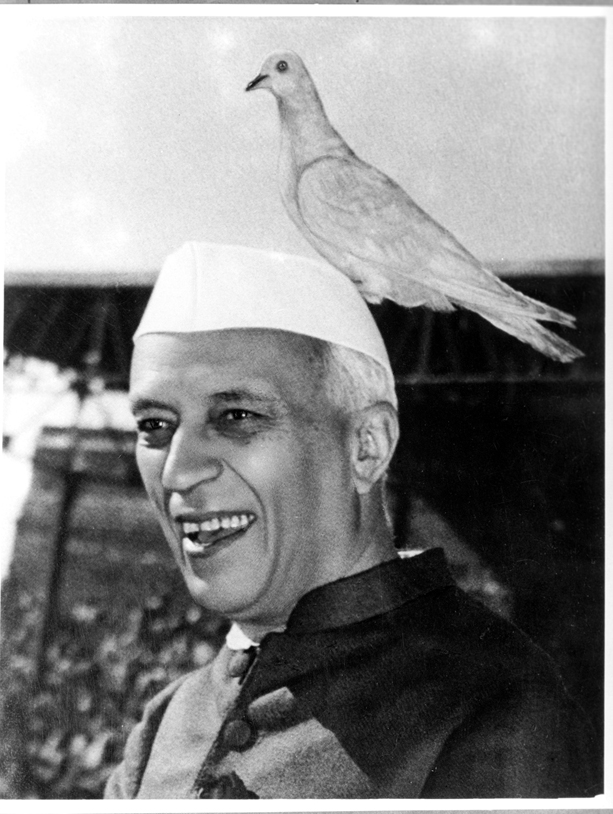
Jawaharlal Nehru

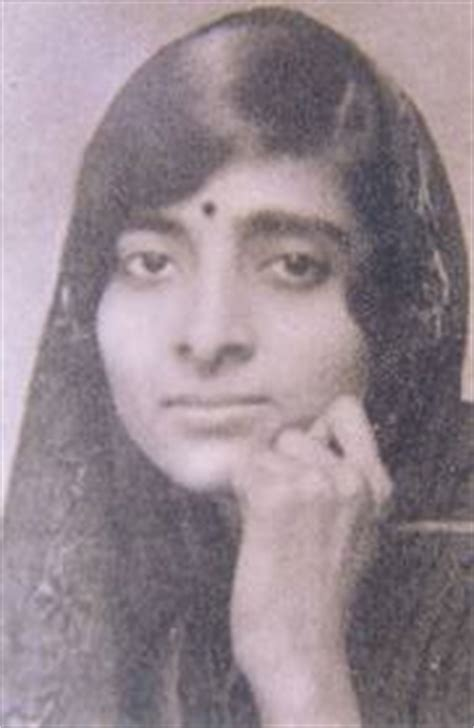
Kamala Nehru

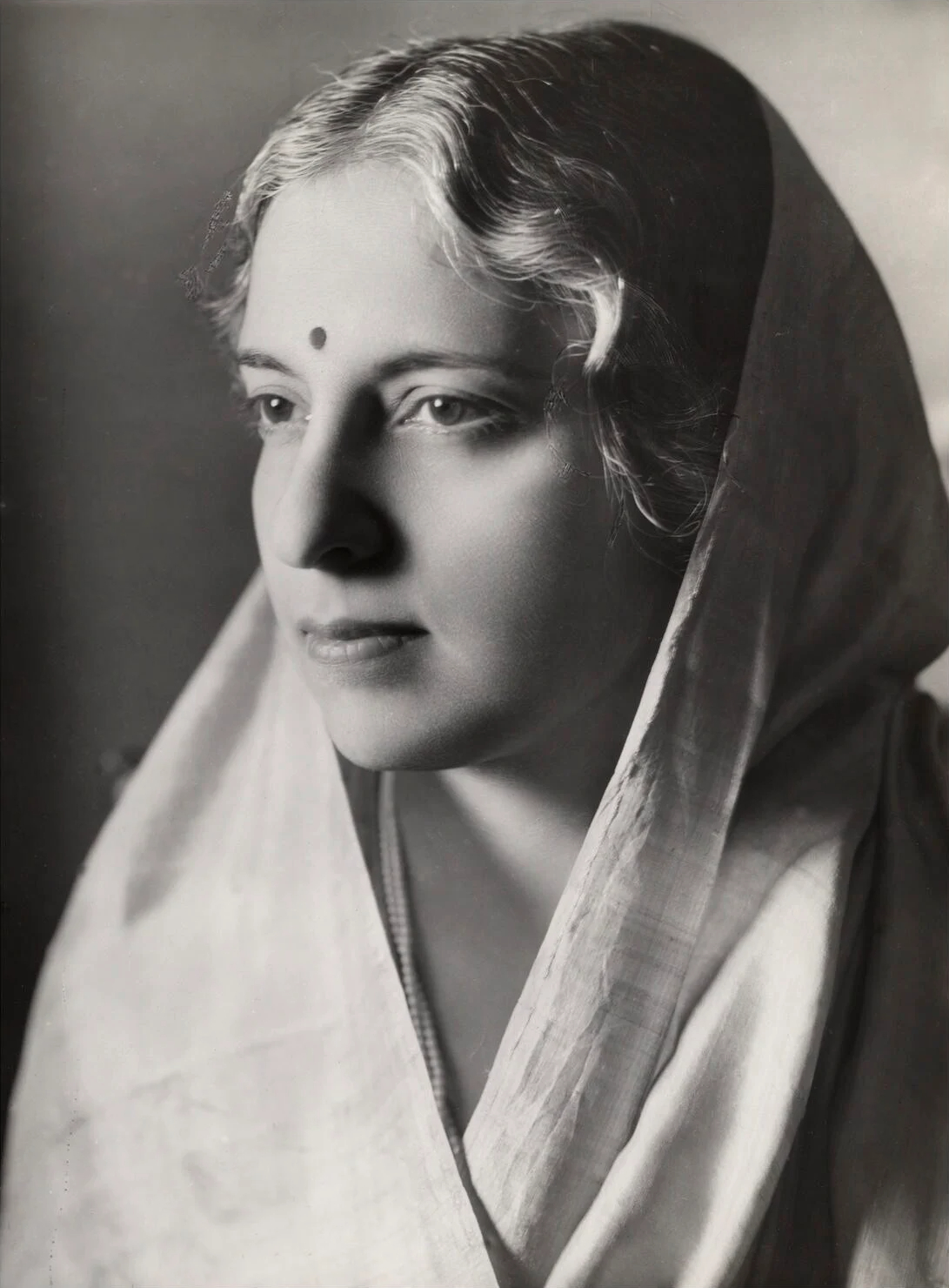
Vijaya Lakshmi Pandit

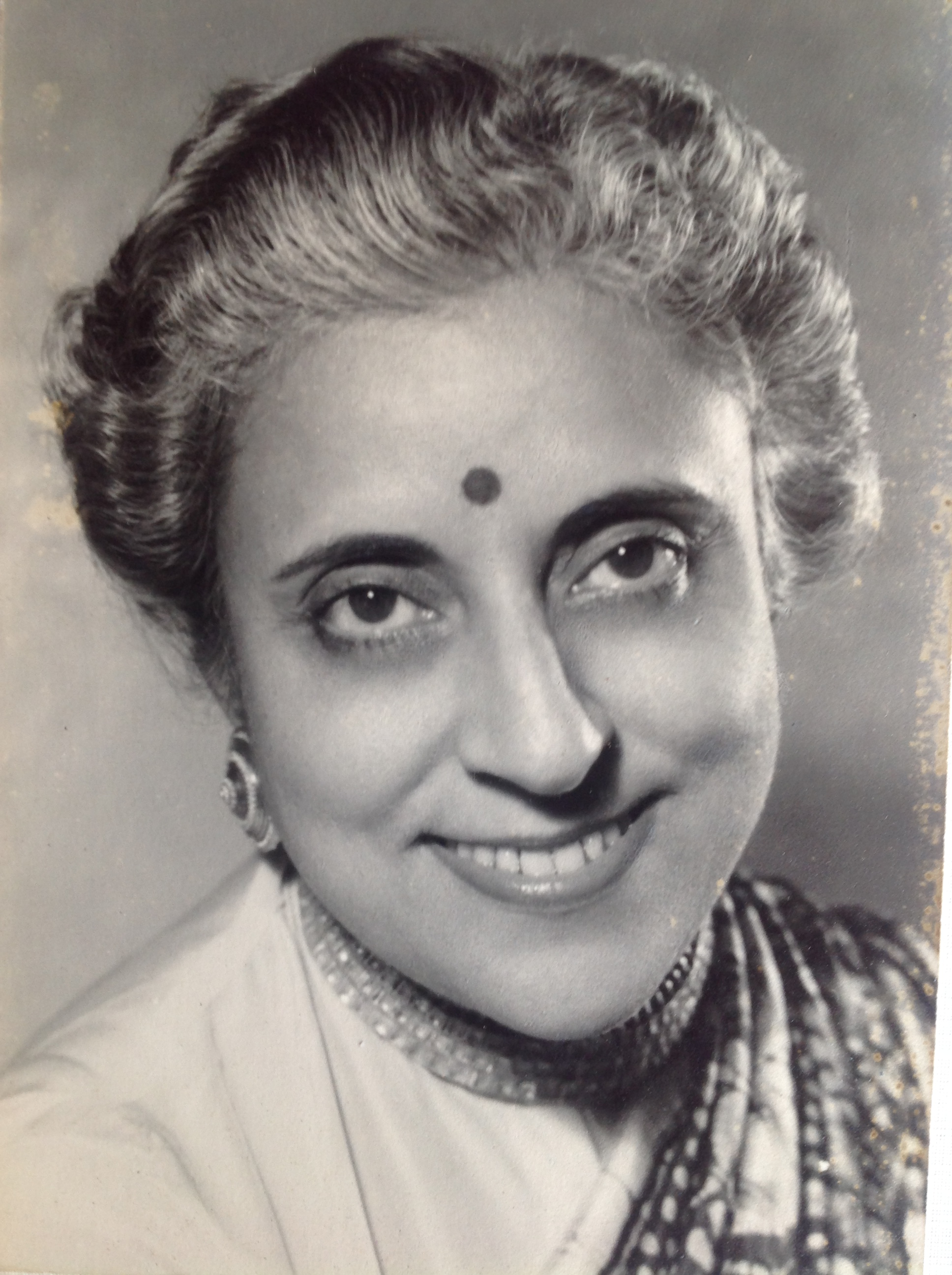
Krishna Hutheesing

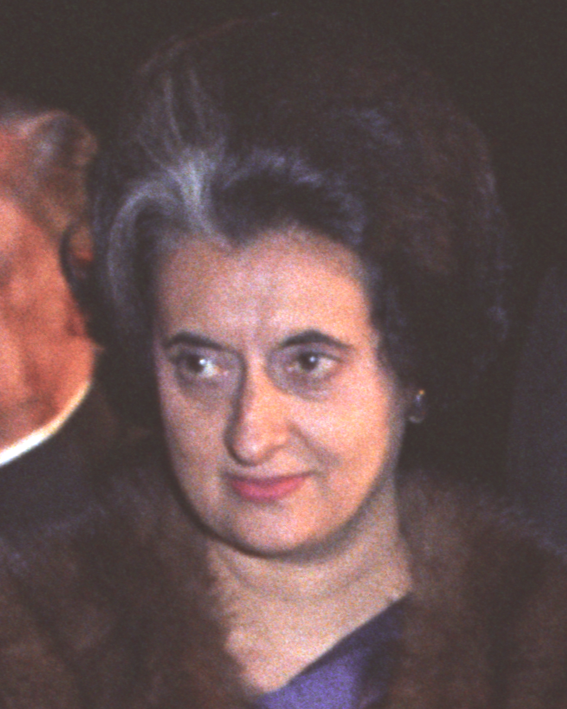
Indira Gandhi

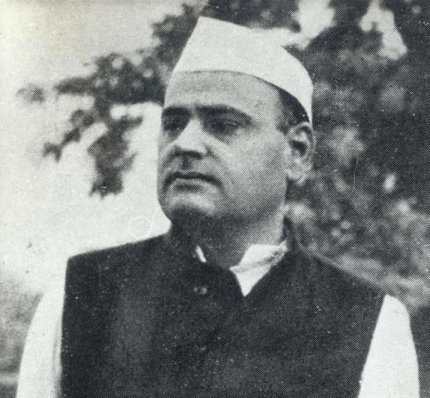
Feroze Gandhi

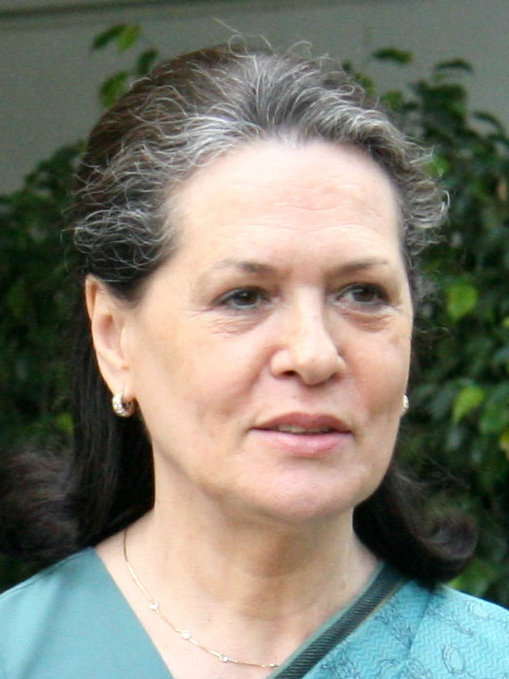
Sonia Gandhi

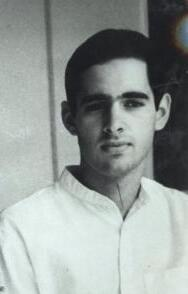
Sanjay Gandhi

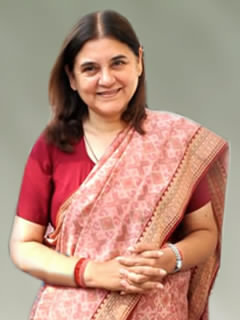
Maneka Gandhi

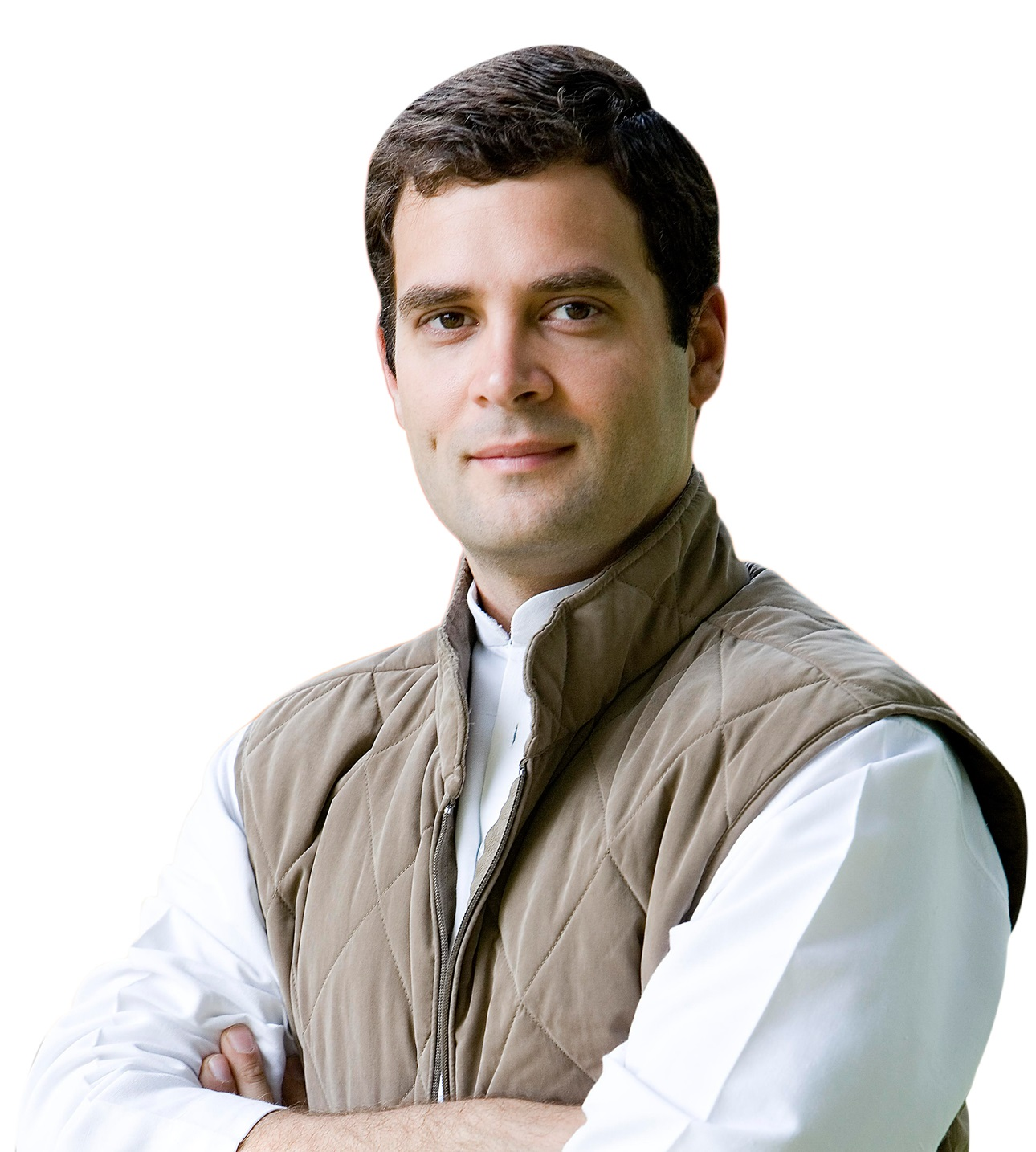
Rahul Gandhi

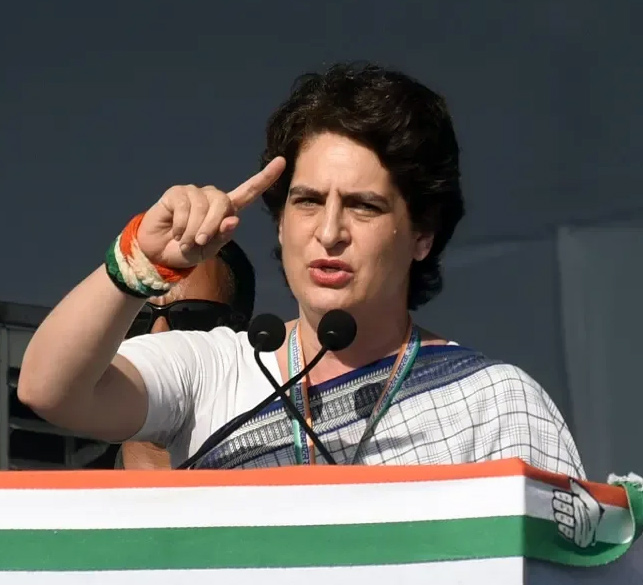
Priyanka Gandhi

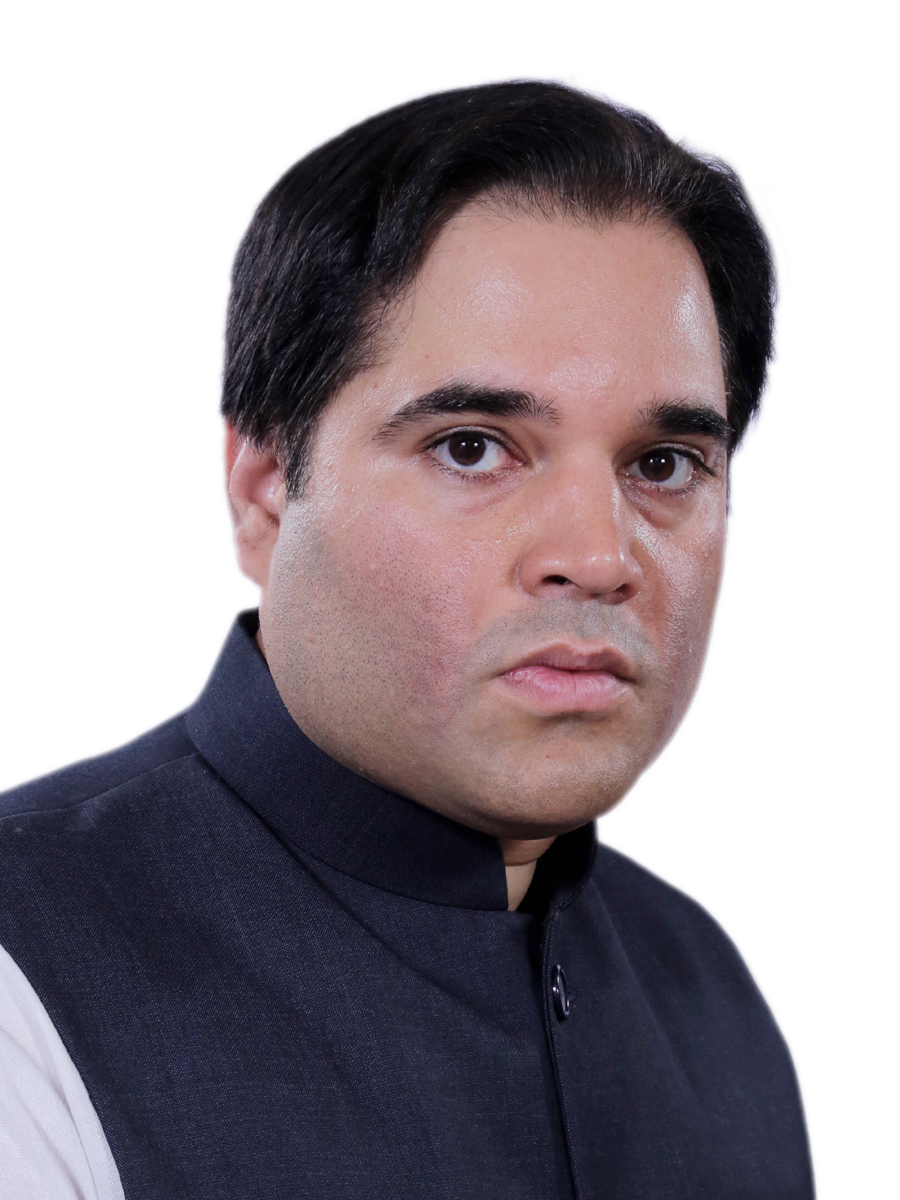
Varun Gandhi

== See also ==
- List of political families
