= Alak Chandra Gupta =

Former Judge of Supreme Court of India (1974-1981)

Hon'ble Justice Alak Chandra Gupta

Judge of Supreme Court of India
- In office 2 September 1974 – 31 December 1981
- Nominated by: Ajit Nath Ray
- Appointed by: V. V. Giri

Judge of Calcutta High Court
- In office 24 February 1964 – 1 September 1974
- Nominated by: B. P. Sinha
- Appointed by: S. Radhakrishnan

Personal details
- Born: 1 January 1917
- Died: 7 November 2000 (aged 83)
- Education: Presidency College, Calcutta (M.A. & LL.B)

Alak Chandra Gupta (1 January 1917 – 7 November 2000) was an Indian jurist who served as the judge of the Supreme Court of India. He also served as the judge of the Calcutta High Court.

== Education and career ==
Gupta was born on 1 January 1917. He educated at Bhowanipore branch of Mitra Institution and Presidency College in Calcutta (now Kolkata). He did his M.A. and LL.B. from the University of Calcutta. He enrolled as an advocate on 31 August 1945 and started practising in Calcutta High Court, primarily in civil and criminal appellate and revisional matters, as well as cases involving Article 226 of the Constitution.

On 24 February 1964, he was appointed an Additional Judge of the Calcutta High Court. He was reappointed for one year on same date in 1965 and finally became permanent on 24 February 1966. On 2 September 1974, he was elevated to the Supreme Court of India, where he served until his retirement on 1 January 1982.

During his tenure in Supreme Court of India, he became the chairman of the Maruti Commission of Inquiry, which investigated allegations relating to the Maruti automobile project associated with Sanjay Gandhi during the Emergency and its aftermath.
