= Krishna Hutheesing =

Indian writer (1907–1967)

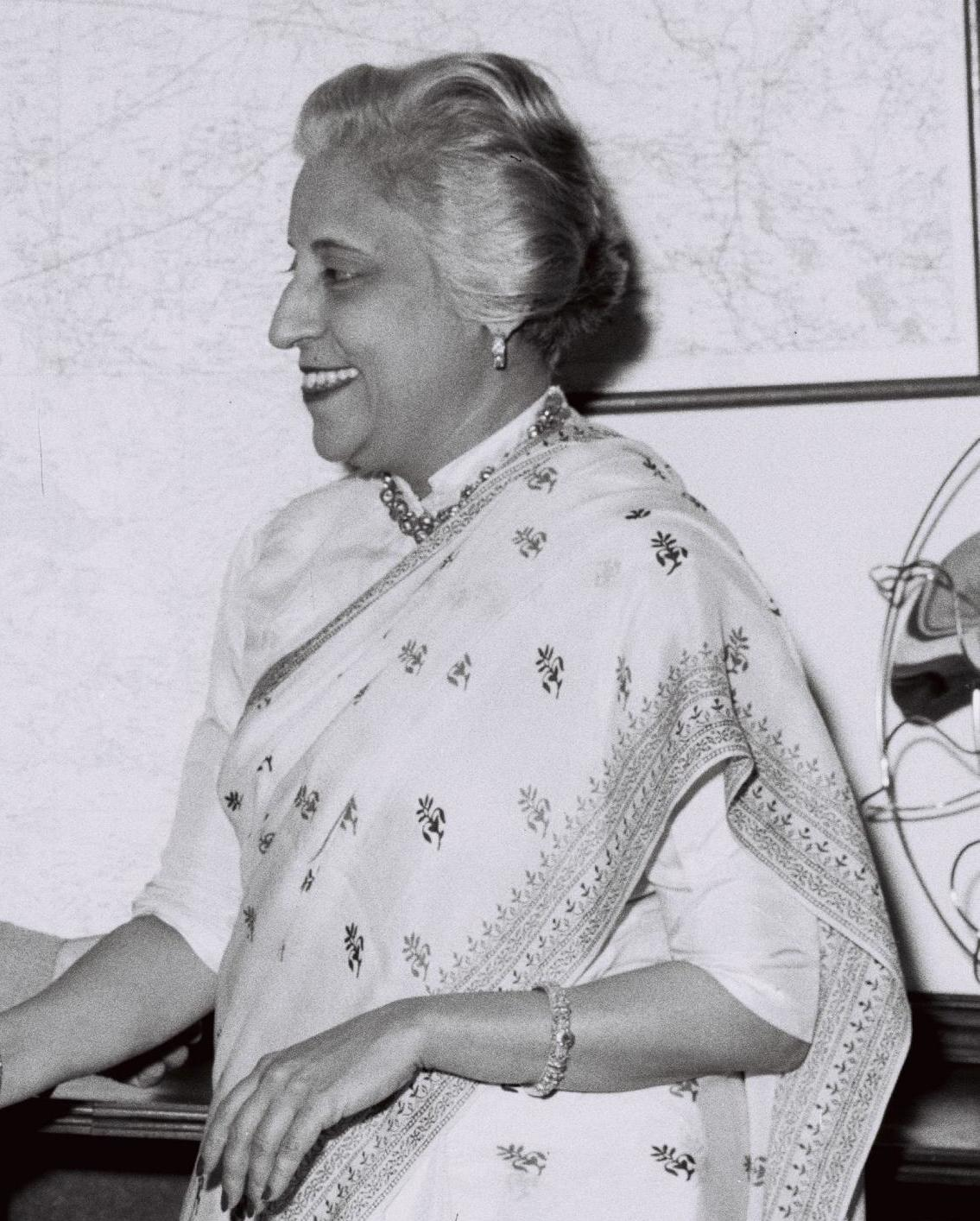
- Hutheesing c. 1958
- Born: Krishna Nehru; 2 November 1907; Allahabad, United Provinces of Agra and Oudh, British India (present-day Prayagraj, India)
- Died: 9 November 1967 (aged 60); London, England
- Occupation: Writer
- Spouse: Gunottam (Raja) Hutheesing
- Children: Harsha Hutheesing; Ajit Hutheesing
- Parent(s): Motilal Nehru (father); Swarup Rani Nehru (mother)
- Relatives: See Nehru family and Hutheesing family

Krishna Nehru Hutheesing (2 November 1907 – 9 November 1967) was an Indian writer, the youngest sister of Jawaharlal Nehru and Vijaya Lakshmi Pandit, and part of the Nehru-Gandhi family.

== Biography ==
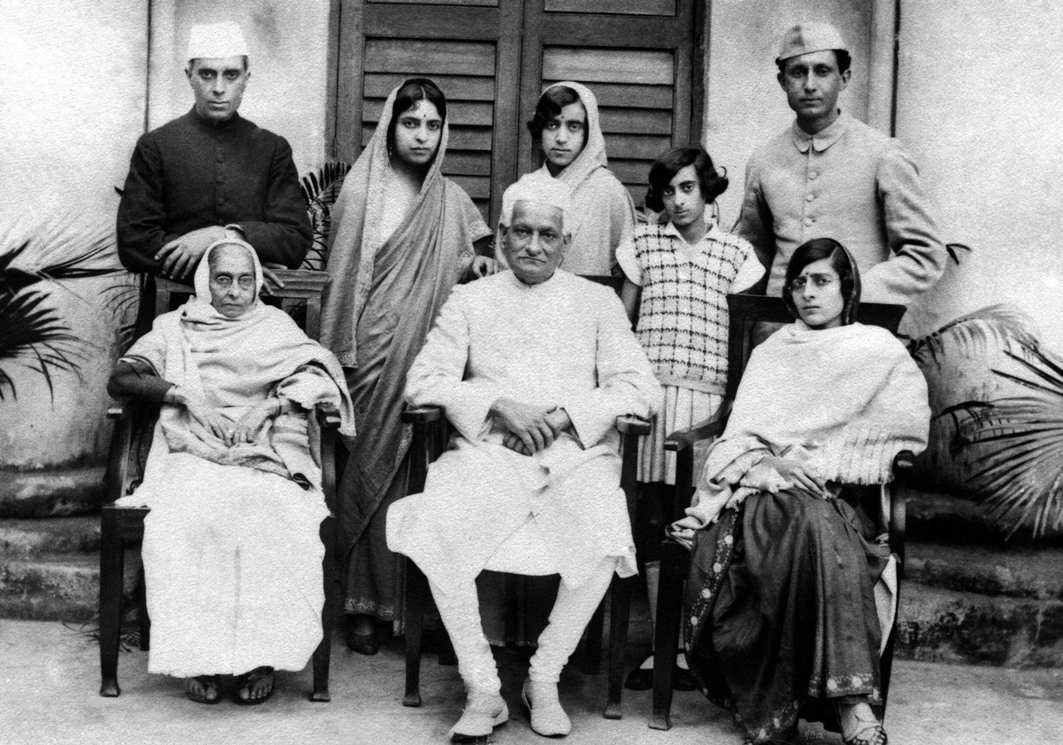
The family of Motilal Nehru, who is seated in the center. Standing (L to R) Jawaharlal Nehru, Vijaya Lakshmi Pandit, Krishna Hutheesing, Indira Gandhi and Ranjit Sitaram Pandit; Seated: Swarup Rani, Motilal Nehru and Kamala Nehru (circa 1927).

Hutheesing was born Krishna Nehru, in Mirganj, Allahabad to Motilal Nehru, an Indian independence activist and leader of the Indian National Congress, and Swarup Rani. She was married to Gunottam (Raja) Hutheesing, who belonged to an Ahmedabad Jain family that built the Hutheesing Jain Temple. During the later 1950s, he became critic of Nehru and in 1959, supported former Governor General C. Rajagopalachari, to form a conservative market liberal political party known as the Swatantra Party.

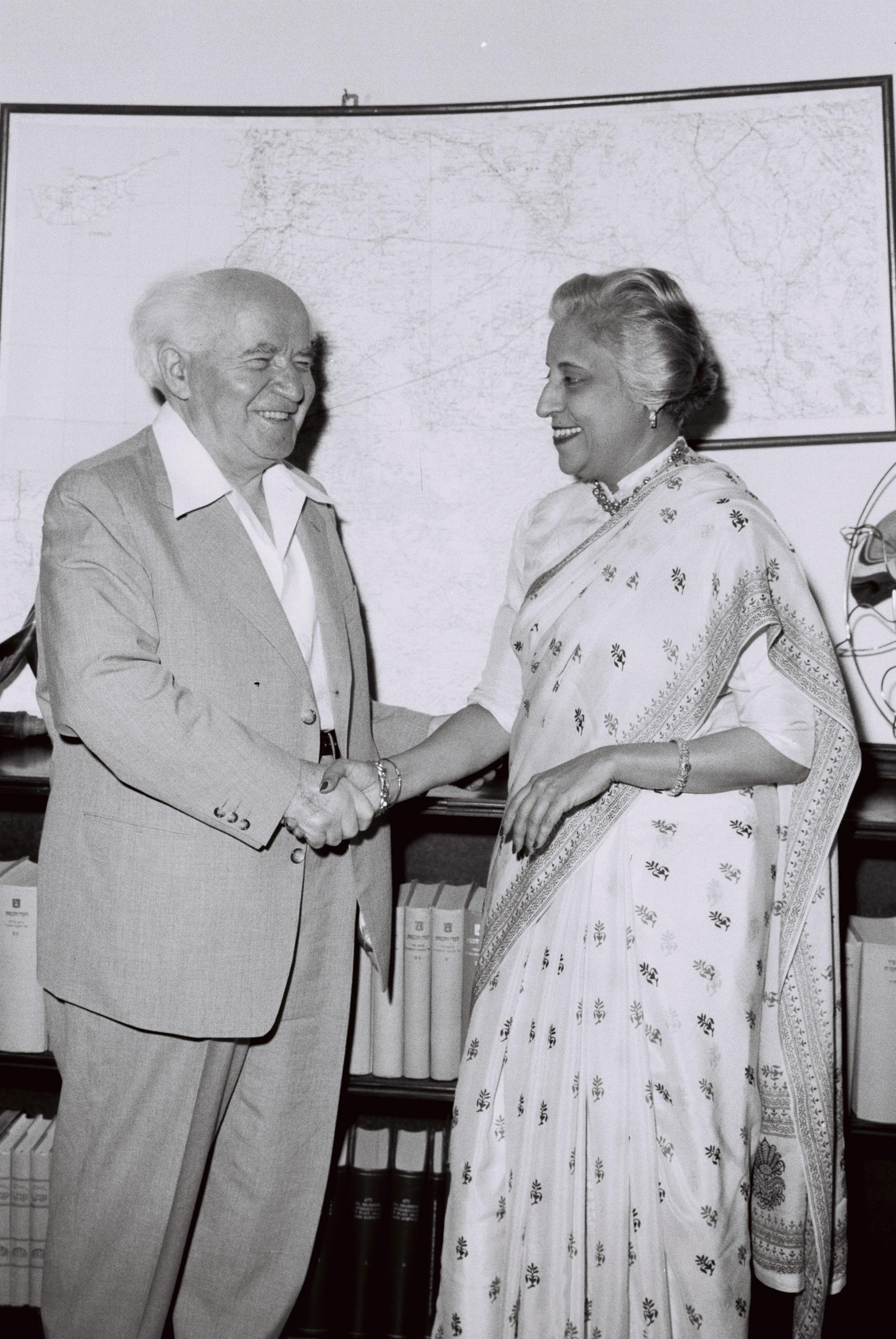
Krishna Hutheesing meeting David Ben-Gurion (the first Prime Minister of Israel) in Israel, 1958

Hutheesing and her husband fought for India's independence and spent a great deal of time in jail. Raja's terms in jail came while they were raising their two young sons, Harsha Hutheesing and Ajit Hutheesing.

In 1950, the Hutheesings toured the United States on a lecture tour. In late May 1958 Krishna spent three days in Israel. Her host was Yigal Alon, who a year earlier founded 'The Israel-India Friendship League' as a tool to circumvent the then Indian government policy to avoid direct diplomatic relations between the two states.

Hutheesing documented her life as well as the lives of her brother, Jawaharlal and her niece, Indira Gandhi, in a series of books that intertwine history with personal anecdotes including We Nehrus, With No Regrets- An Autobiography, and Dear to Behold: An Intimate Portrait of Indira Gandhi.

Hutheesing's husband, Raja, also wrote books: The Great Peace: An Asian's Candid Report on Red China (1953), Window on China (1953), and Tibet fights for freedom : the story of the March 1959 uprising (1960).

Hutheesing was associated with the 'Voice of America' and gave several talks. She died in London in 1967.

== Bibliography ==
- Shadows On the Wall, J. Day Co., 1948.
- The Story of Gandhiji, Kutub Pub., 1949.
- We Nehrus, by Krishna (Nehru) Hutheesing with Alden Hatch. Holt, Rinehart and Winston; 1967.
- Dear to Behold: An Intimate Portrait of Indira Gandhi, Published by Macmillan, 1969.
- With No Regrets - An Autobiography, by Krishna Nehru Hutheesing, Published by READ BOOKS, 2007. ISBN 1-4067-7661-0. (Online text, 1945 edition)
