= Katherine Frank (biographer) =

American author and biographer

Katherine Frank is a noted American author and biographer, now living in England. Her works include a highly acclaimed biography of Lucie, Lady Duff-Gordon, and the more controversial book Indira: The Life of Indira Nehru Gandhi, a biography of Indira Gandhi. She has also written A Voyager Out: The Life of Mary Kingsley, Emily Brontë: A Chainless Soul and Crusoe: Daniel Defoe, Robert Knox and the Creation of a Myth.
