= Swarup Rani Nehru =

Jawaharlal Nehru's mother and Indian independence activist (1868-1938)

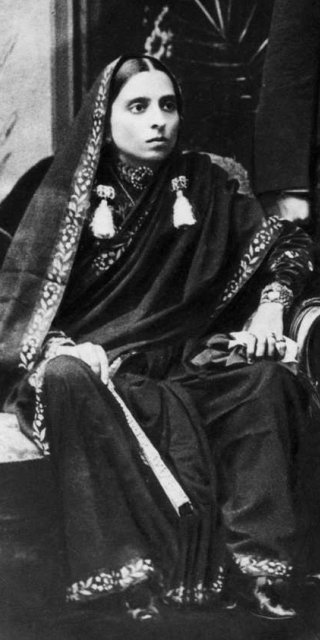
- Born: Swarup Rani Thussu c. 1868; Lahore, Punjab, British India (present-day Punjab, Pakistan)
- Died: 10 January 1938 (aged 70)
- Political party: Indian National Congress
- Spouse: Motilal Nehru
- Children: Jawaharlal Nehru; Vijaya Lakshmi Pandit; Krishna Hutheesing
- Relatives: Indira Gandhi (granddaughter) Rajiv Gandhi (great-grandson)
- Family: Nehru–Gandhi family

Swarup Rani Nehru (née Thussu; 1868 – 10 January 1938) was an Indian independence activist. She was the wife of barrister and Indian National Congress leader Motilal Nehru and the mother of India's first Prime Minister, Jawaharlal Nehru, Vijaya Lakshmi Pandit, and Krishna Nehru Hutheesing.

She played a prominent role in India's freedom movement in the 1920s–30s as an advocate of civil disobedience against the British Raj and its salt laws, and encouraged women to make salt.

== Early life ==
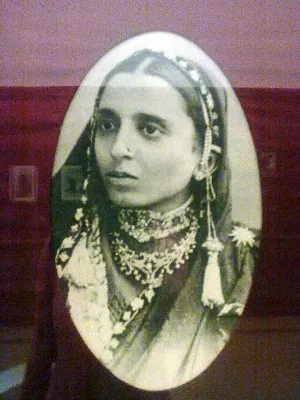
Swarup Rani, as a young wife, wearing Dejhoor, Athoor and Atah

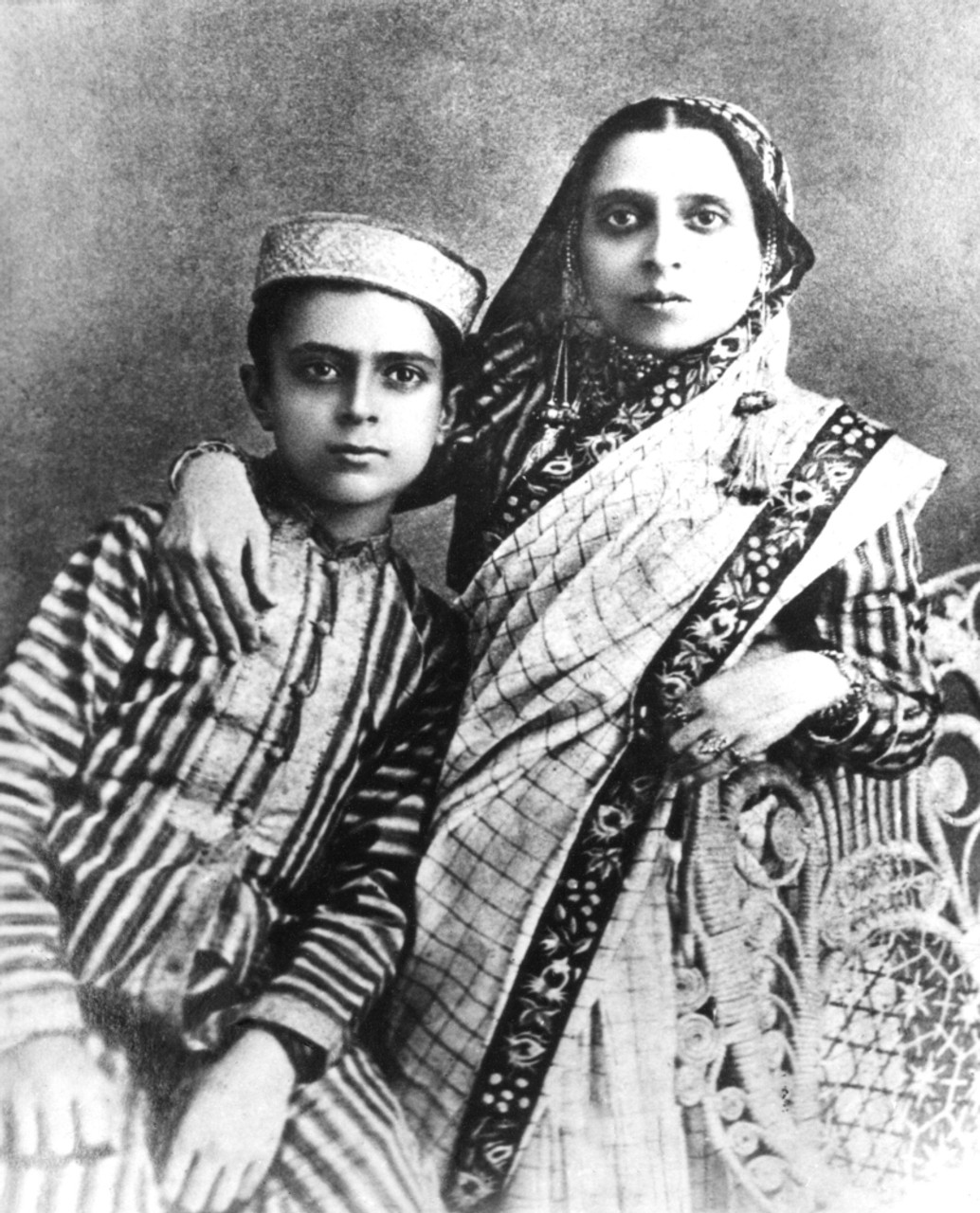
Swarup Rani with her son Jawaharlal Nehru as a young boy

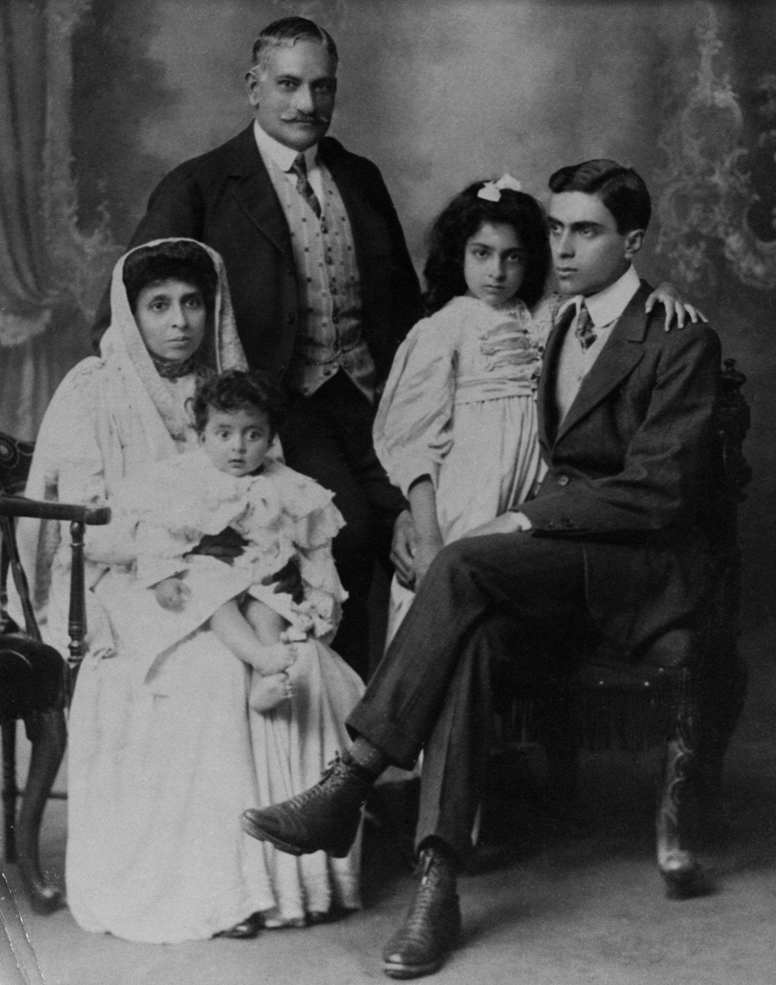
Swarup Rani (first on left) with Motilal (standing) and their children in England

Swarup Rani Nehru was born as Swarup Rani Thussu to Manohar Lal Thussu, a Kashmiri Pandit from Punjab, in Lahore in 1868. Her eyes were hazel in colour and her hair was chestnut brown. Although she understood English, she did not speak the language herself.

She was the second wife of Motilal Nehru, who had been previously married as a teenager. Both his first wife and their son died in childbirth. Soon after Swarup Rani and Motilal married, they had a son who died in infancy. One legend recounts that they were informed by a yogi that they would never have a son, and ten months after the yogi's death, on 14 November 1889, a boy, Jawaharlal Nehru was born. A few years into their marriage, Swarup Rani's health deteriorated. For the rest of her life, during recurrent relapses of illness, her elder sister Rajvati took care of her.

Family life before 1920 took place in the mansion then known as Anand Bhavan, Allahabad, in an affluent neighbourhood with mainly British neighbours. The household consisted of an extended family. There was electricity and running water, and the compound included stables, a swimming pool and a tennis court. Many of Swarup Rani's husband's suits were tailored in Savile Row, her son's toys came from England, and the family was the first in Allahabad to own a car.

On 18 August 1900, Swarup Rani gave birth to a daughter, Swarup Kumari, better known as Vijayalakshmi Pandit.

On 5 May 1905, Swarup Rani left Bombay and travelled to London with her husband, son and eldest daughter. Motilal's intentions were to place Jawaharlal in a good school, and also, as he noted to his nephew Brij Lal Nehru, who was in Oxford at the time, to "consult some specialists about the proper treatment and the most suitable watering place for [my] wife". Following a tour of Europe, and a farewell to Jawaharlal at Harrow School, they arrived back in Allahabad in November 1905. In the same month, and coincidentally on Jawaharlal's birthday, Swarup Rani gave birth to a third son, who they named Ratan Lal. However, this son died in infancy. On 2 November 1907, Swarup Rani's second daughter and last child, Krishna, was born.

Swarup Rani's daughters' names were anglicised from 'Nanhi' and 'Beti', to 'Nan' and 'Betty' by their English governesses, and Jawaharlal was tutored in English poetry, but Swarup Rani was a key influence on him. An early family portrait has Victorian-looking style, and Jawaharlal sits in a sailor suit, but Swarup Rani and the other Nehru women in the household exerted a traditional Hindu influence on him. Despite becoming increasingly unwell herself, Swarup Rani went to much effort to keep at bay 'the evil eye' from those who were envious or who excessively admired her only surviving son, by applying a black dot on his forehead.

During the First World War, Swarup Rani helped knit and gather woollen clothing for soldiers, along with groups of European and Indian ladies. Sometime before 1916, Swarup Rani received a letter from her son Jawaharlal, suggesting that he preferred not to have an arranged marriage, and might choose to stay a bachelor. However, Swarup Rani had consulted a trusted pandit, and after having their horoscopes compared, Jawaharlal Nehru and Kamala Kaul were married on 8 February 1916.

A swami once recounted that Swarup Rani was "a devout, traditional Hindu whose one regret was that Jawaharlal and Kamala had no living son". On the night of 19 November 1917, Swarup announced "Hua". Unable to say "female", she simply announced that it has happened: a grandchild (later known as Indira Gandhi) had been born while her husband was drinking Haig. She had wanted a grandson. Later, Indira would refer to her grandmother as "Dol Amma", the grandmother who would give her sweets from the "doli", the food cupboard.

== Later life ==
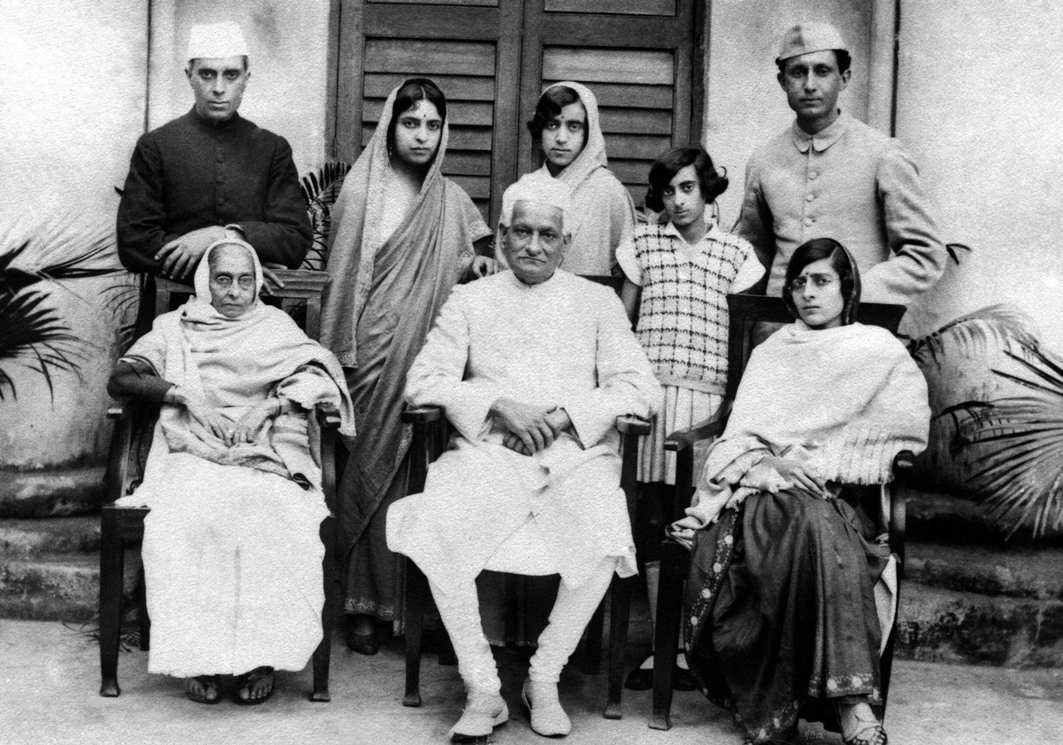
Nehru-Gandhi family group photo, Sawrup Rani Nehru seated first left

In 1920, with Mohandas K. Gandhi as the leader of the Indian National Congress and with his two-fold strategy of non-cooperation with the British and a fight against Indian "social evils" starting with untouchability, the ethos and functioning of the Nehru family household transformed. Both Jawaharlal and Motilal gave up their legal practices. The resulting financial difficulties also led to the sale of the Nehru women's jewellery, including Swarup Rani's. Their daughter Krishna was taken out from school, the twice daily meals merged into one, and stables, staff, the fineries of life including crockery and crystal were reduced. The women subsequently adapted to a house frequently visited by Congress men.

On 6 December 1921, shortly after the Viceroy gave instructions to the Secretary of State to arrest and prosecute "any person, however prominent" ... considered necessary "for maintenance of law and respect of authority", Motilal and Jawaharlal were arrested and taken to prison. At an interview with Swarup Rani, she "rejoiced in the great privilege of sending my dear husband and my only son to jail" and she added that "Mahatma Gandhi told me once that others in the world have also their only sons". On 26 January 1922, with the aim to recruit women to the Indian Congress party, Swarup Rani presided over a meeting in Idgah where 1000 people attended. Swarup Rani's granddaughter Nayantara Sahgal, later described how Swarup Rani "had in her widowhood taken a soldier's part in the national movement".

In 1930, with the launch of the civil disobedience movement and Gandhi's Salt March, Motilal gave Anand Bhavan to the Indian Congress Party. In the same year, Swarup Rani, in favour of the movement against the British Raj and its salt laws, endorsed the self manufacturing of salt. She appealed to women to enlist themselves into co-operating for self-rule: "if you are true to your motherland then you should start manufacturing salt in every household". When Motilal died on 6 February 1931, Swarup Rani was at his bedside.

In 1932, on a visit to Calcutta for Kamala's treatment, Swarup Rani expressed concern over Kamala's strict adherence to self-discipline and refraining from all forms of luxuries, wishing for her to wear at least a "necklace and a pair of bangles". During another incident, a day after visiting her son in prison, Swarup Rani was found by a swami to be sitting in a room in the sweltering heat and without the fan switched on. The swami reported "the mother's heart was touched, and henceforth she refused to enjoy the comfort of an electric fan while her son rotted in the hot prison cell". In the same year, she was beaten and injured in a lathi charge during a demonstration. She wrote to her son "the mother of a brave son is also somewhat like him".

In his autobiography, Jawaharlal Nehru writes: "Though my admiration and affection for him (his father) remained as strong as ever, fear formed part of them. Not so with my mother. I had no fear of her, for I knew that she would condone everything I did, and because of her excessive and indiscriminating love for me, I tried to dominate over her a little. I saw much more of her than I did of father."

== Death and legacy ==
She died on 10 January 1938, with her sister, son Nehru and daughters Sarup and Betty beside her. Her sister died the following day.

The Swarup Rani Nehru Hospital in Allahabad is named in her honour.

== See also ==
- Nehru–Gandhi family
