= Ranjit Sitaram Pandit =

Indian barrister, politician, author and scholar (1893–1944)

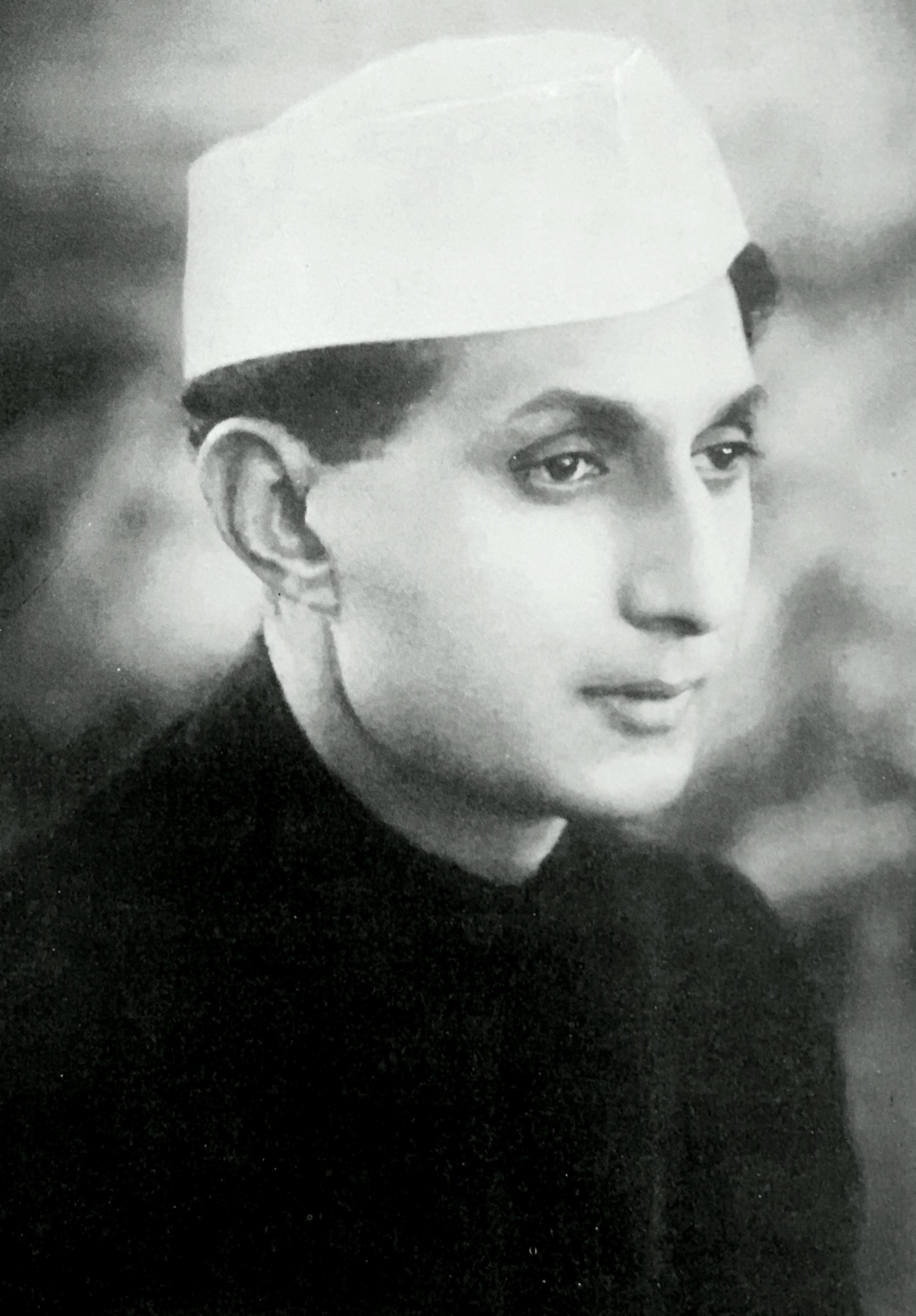
- Sitaram Pandit as MLA of UP in 1937
- Born: September 1893; Rajkot, Rajkot State, British India
- Died: 14 January 1944 (aged 50); Lucknow, United Provinces, British India
- Occupations: Barrister; Politician
- Spouse: Vijaya Lakshmi pandit (m. 1921)
- Children: 3, including Nayantara Sahgal

Academic background
- Education: Christ Church, University of Oxford
- Influences: Mahatma Gandhi; Jawaharlal Nehru

Academic work
- Notable works: Translations of: Rajatarangini; Mudrarakshasa; Ṛtusaṃhāra

Ranjit Sitaram Pandit (September 1893 – 14 January 1944) was an Indian barrister, politician, author and scholar from Rajkot in the Kathiawar region of India. He is known for his role in the Indian non-cooperation movement, and for translating the Sanskrit texts Mudrarakshasa, Ṛtusaṃhāra and Kalhana's Rajatarangini into English.

He was the husband of Vijaya Lakshmi Pandit, the son-in-law of Motilal Nehru, brother-in-law of Jawaharlal Nehru and father of Nayantara Sahgal.

Until 1926, he was a barrister in Calcutta, a position he resigned to join the Indian non-cooperation movement. In 1930, he was the Secretary of the Peshawar Enquiry Committee, which investigated the troubles in the North West Frontier Province. Later, he was appointed a Member of the Legislative Assembly (MLA) of the United Provinces of Agra and Oudh (UP).

Pandit died in 1944, shortly after being released from his fourth imprisonment by the British.

== Early life and education ==
Ranjit Sitaram Pandit was born in September 1893, to the wealthy British-educated lawyer Sitaram Narayan Pandit, in Rajkot in the Kathiawar district of British India. His ancestors came from Bambuli village in the Ratnagiri district of Maharashtra and his family consisted of a number of lawyers and Sanskrit scholars. Amongst his siblings was a brother, Pratap, and two sisters, Ramabai and Tarabai. He was a linguist and spoke eleven languages, including Hindi, Persian, Bengali, English, French and German, and like his father, he studied law in England. Prior to entering the Middle Temple, he attended Christ Church, University of Oxford. He had also attended the Sorbonne University and the University of Heidelberg.

He had an interest in horticulture, could play the violin and was proficient at tennis, polo, cricket, swimming and hunting.

In 1920, Mahadev Desai, a friend of Pandit's from college, recommended that Sarup Nehru, Motilal Nehru's daughter, read Pandit's article published in Modern Review titled "At the Feet of the Guru". Desai was then secretary to Mahatma Gandhi, who was a family friend to the Pandits in Kathiawar. Pandit and Sarup Nehru were subsequently introduced to each other and he proposed to her at the end of his three day stay at her home, writing in one note that "I have come many miles and crossed many bridges to come to you—but in the future you and I must cross our bridges hand in hand". On 10 May 1921, the anniversary of the Indian Rebellion of 1857, they married, upon which, she adopted the name Vijaya Lakshmi Pandit. With the Nehrus now involved in the Indian non-cooperation movement and in boycotting British goods, the wedding was the last event in the Nehru household "approaching opulence at Anand Bhavan". Their first daughter, Vatsala, died at the age of nine months. Subsequently, they had three daughters; Chandralekha Mehta, Nayantara Sahgal and Rita Dar, born in 1924, 1927 and 1929 respectively.

== Non-cooperation movement ==
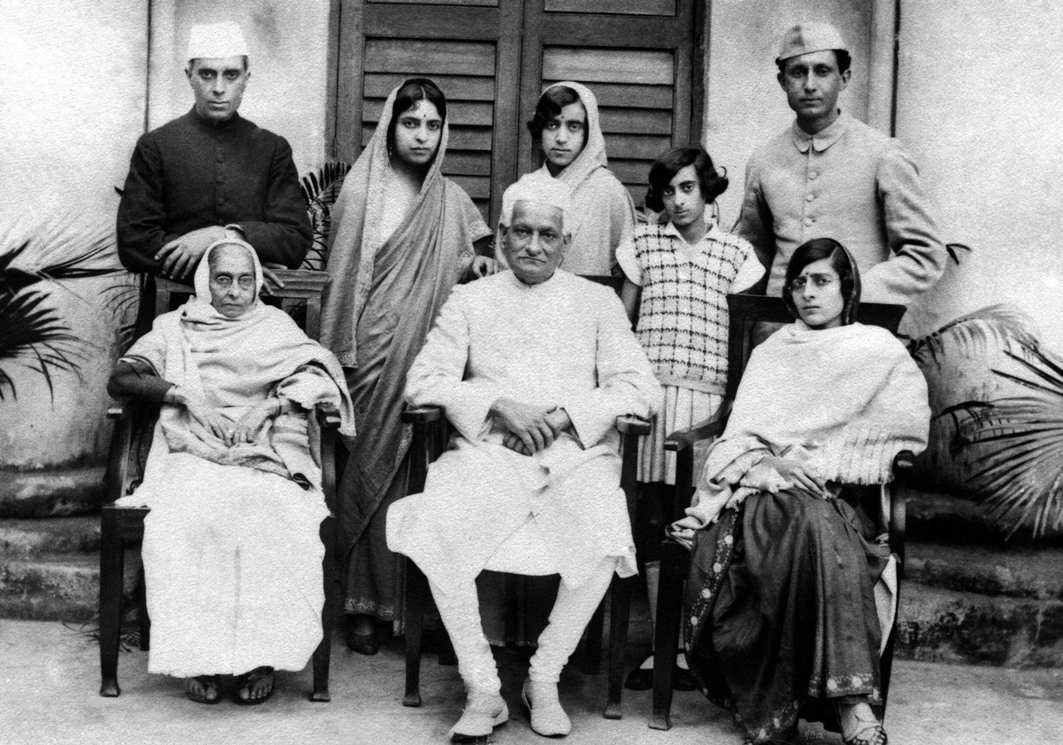
Nehru-Gandhi family group photo. R. S. Pandit is standing at the far right.

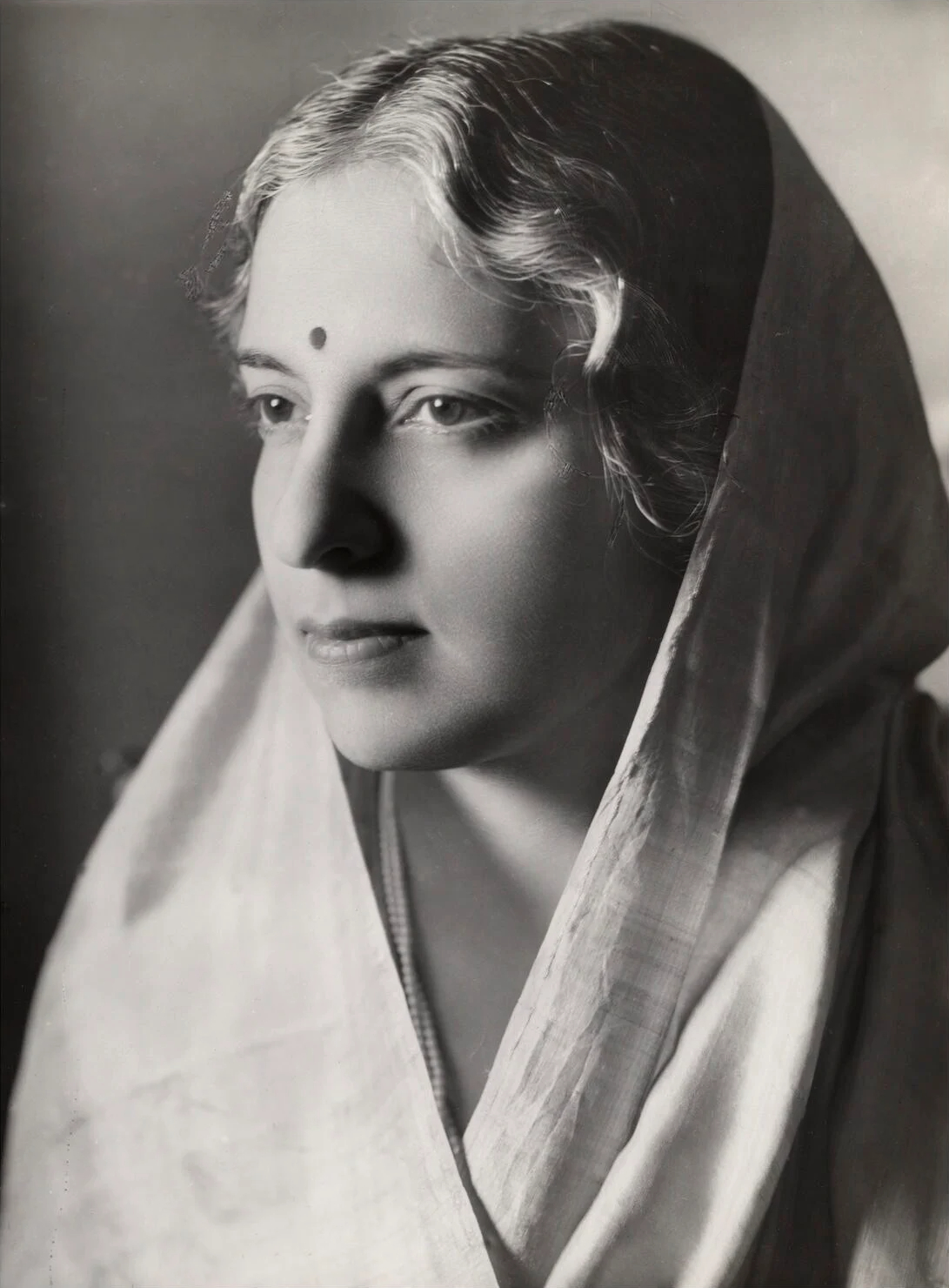
Vijaya Lakshmi Pandit

On 1 March 1926, Pandit, together with his wife Vijaya Lakshmi, his brother-in-law Jawaharlal Nehru, sister-in-law Kamala Nehru and niece Indira, sailed to Europe on the Lloyd liner Triestino. He returned with Vijaya Lakshmi the following November. Until this European trip, Pandit was a successful lawyer who practiced in what was then called Calcutta with Sir B. L. Mitter. Against the wishes of his family in Rajkot, he became a Satyagrahi and joined Mahatma Gandhi and Motilal Nehru in the Indian non-cooperation movement and settled in Allahabad, where he took up cases in the courts. Later, they moved to Khali, in the hills near Almora.

When the Indian National Congress's 1928 proposal for Dominion status was rejected by the British, the party took a pledge of non-cooperation and demanded "complete independence". Vijaya Lakshmi later recorded in her autobiography, that on 29 December 1929, upon the declaration of independence by the Congress's then president Jawaharlal Nehru, Pandit joined him in the celebrations.

In 1930, Motilal Nehru appointed Pandit the Secretary of the Peshawar Enquiry Committee, to investigate troubles in the North West Frontier Province. Its report was published by Allahabad's Law Journal Press. In 1937, he was listed in The Indian Annual Register as a Member of the Legislative Assembly (MLA) of United Provinces of Agra and Oudh (UP), to which he was elected along with Vijaya Lakshmi.

He served several prison terms, including two prison sentences with Jawaharlal Nehru, one in Naini Central Jail in 1931 and another at Dehradun. His daughter, Nayantara, later described how she ate chocolate cake the day her father first went to prison. She later became a writer, and associating chocolate cake with prison, wrote a book titled Prison and Chocolate Cake.

== Translations ==
While in prison, Pandit translated into English Kalhana's Rajatarangini, the 12th century history of the kings of Kashmir, written in Sanskrit, and described the poem as one of "great scope, a more or less complete picture of society, in which the bloody periods of the past are delightfully relieved by delicate tales of love, by episodes of marvel and mystery and by interesting digressions which the author permits himself". The foreword to the translation was written by Jawaharlal Nehru.

He translated from Sanskrit to English, the play Mudrarakshasa and in 1942 completed the translation of Ṛtusaṃhāra.

== Death ==
In 1943, he was reported to have had pneumonia, pleurisy and a heart attack in Bareilly Central Jail. Vijaya Lakshmi visited him, and later described how "it was a tremendous shock to see Ranjit brought in to the superintendent's office on a stretcher. His head had been shaved and he was emaciated and almost unrecognisable”. He had been arrested that year by British authorities and was serving his fourth term in prison. He died shortly after being released. On 18 January 1944, Nehru wrote to his daughter Indu, that he was informed that Pandit (Pupha to Indu) died in Lucknow on 14 January 1944, before the reformation of personal law which was completed after independence, leaving his widow to raise their three daughters without an inheritance. Pandit's brother, Pratap, had frozen their assets.

Author Katherine Frank wrote in her biography of Indira Gandhi, that Pandit's death "was an unnecessary death directly attributable to the poor conditions and treatment he had received in jail. Winston Churchill was later reported by Pandit's widow, on a visit to England after independence of India, to have said to her that “we killed your husband didn't we”. Pandit's daughter, Nayantara, wrote in her biography of Nehru that her mother replied "no, every man lives only to his appointed hour" and Churchill replied "nobly spoken".

== Selected publications ==
- Indian National Congress Peshawar Enquiry Committee. Working Committee of the Indian National Congress. Bombay: Government Press (1930)
- Rājataraṅgiṇi; the saga of the kings of Kaśmīr. New Delhi: Sahitya Akademi (1935)
- Mudrarakśasa : (The signet ring). With Viśākhadatta. Bombay: New Book Company (1944)
- Ritusamhara Or The Peageant Of The Seasons. Bombay: The National Informations & Publications Ltd. (1947)
