= Brijlal Nehru =

Indian civil servant (1884-1965)

Brijalal Nehru (5 May 1884 – 22 May 1965) was a noted civil servant and member of the Nehru family.

He was the son of Pandit Nandlal Nehru (the elder brother of Motilal Nehru) and the cousin of Jawaharlal Nehru. Nandlal Nehru was Diwan of Khetri State for 11 years.

Brijlal was born on 5 May 1884 in Allahabad and he grew up in Anand Bhawan. Brijlal had been sent to Oxford in 1905 to compete for the Indian Civil Service by Motilal Nehru. He was a senior officer of the Audit and Accounts Service. After his retirement, he served Finance Minister of Princely State of Jammu & Kashmir during reign of Maharaja Hari Singh.

He was married to Rameshwari Raina, a noted social and women activist and a freedom fighter and recipient of Padma Bhushan, Later she also won the Lenin Peace Prize in 1961.

Their son was Braj Kumar Nehru, an administrator and Padma Vibhushan recipient.

Brijlal died on 22 May 1965.
