= Gangadhar Nehru =

Kotwal and Motilal Nehru's father (1827 – 1861)

- Born: 1827
- Died: 10 February 1861 (aged 33–34); New Delhi, British India

Gangadhar Nehru (1827 – 10 February 1861) was the kotwal (chief police officer) of Delhi during the 1857 Indian rebellion. He was the father of Indian National Congress leader Motilal Nehru and the grandfather of the first Prime Minister of India, Jawaharlal Nehru.

== Early life ==
He was born in 1827, was appointed the kotwal of Delhi sometime before 1857. He was the last Kotwal of Delhi. After the revolt of 1857, when the British police took over the city of Delhi and started the massacre, he moved to Agra with his wife Jiorani Devi and their three children.

== Sons ==
He had three sons. The eldest, Banshidhar Nehru, started working in the Justice Department after the establishment of Victoria's rule in India and was continuously appointed to various places across the country, which kept him away from the family. The second son, Nandlal Nehru, served as the Diwan of Khetri, a princely state in Rajasthan, for about ten years. Later, he returned to Agra, obtained his legal education, and began practicing law there, becoming one of Agra's successful lawyers. Due to the formation of the Allahabad High Court, he had to spend most of his time in Allahabad for work, so he moved his family there permanently and practiced law in both Allahabad and Kanpur.

The third son was Motilal Nehru, who was deeply influenced by his elder brother, Nandlal Nehru. Since Nandlal was considered one of the best lawyers in Kanpur, Motilal started his practice there as his assistant. Motilal later became a famous lawyer in his own right. His son (Gangadhar's grandson), Jawaharlal Nehru, became the first Prime Minister of India.
