= Motilal Nehru =

Indian lawyer and politician (1861–1931)

Pandit Motilal Nehru
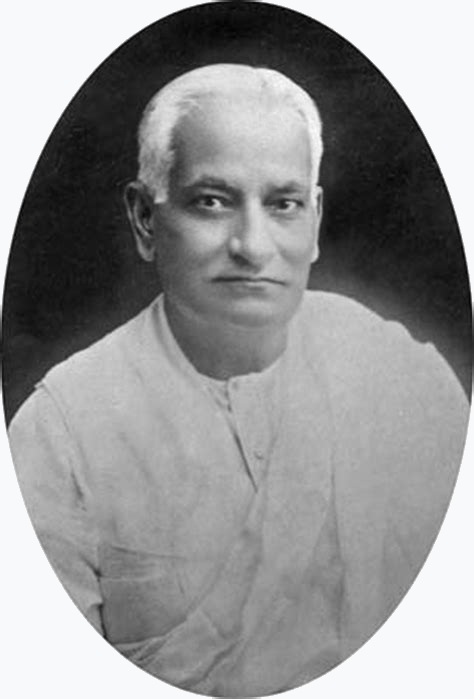
- Nehru in the 1910s

President of the Indian National Congress
- In office 1919–1920
- Preceded by: Syed Hasan Imam
- Succeeded by: Lala Lajpat Rai
- In office 1928–1929
- Preceded by: Mukhtar Ahmed Ansari
- Succeeded by: Jawaharlal Nehru

Personal details
- Born: 6 May 1861 Agra, North-Western Provinces, British India (present-day Uttar Pradesh, India)
- Died: 6 February 1931 (aged 69) Lucknow, United Provinces, British India (present-day Uttar Pradesh, India)
- Spouse: Swarup Rani Thussu
- Children: Jawaharlal; Vijaya Lakshmi; Krishna
- Relatives: Indira Gandhi (granddaughter); Rajiv Gandhi (great-grandson)
- Education: Muir Central College
- Occupation: Barrister; Activist; Lawyer; Politician

Motilal Nehru (6 May 1861 – 6 February 1931) was an Indian lawyer, activist, and politician affiliated with the Indian National Congress. He served as the Congress President twice, from 1919 to 1920 and from 1928 to 1929. He was a patriarch of the Nehru-Gandhi family and the father of Jawaharlal Nehru, India's first Prime Minister.

== Early life and education ==
Motilal Nehru was born on 6 May 1861 in a Kashmiri Pandits (Brahmin) family as the posthumous son of Gangadhar Nehru and his wife Indrani. During the Indian Rebellion of 1857, Gangadhar Nehru was the kotwal or police officer of Delhi.

Thus, Motilal came to spend his childhood in Khetri, second largest thikana (feudal estate) within the princely state of Jaipur, now in Rajasthan. His elder brother, Nandlal Nehru gained the favour of Raja Fateh Singh of Khetri, who was the same age as him, and rose to the position of Diwan (Chief Minister; effectively the manager) of the vast feudal estate. In 1870, Fateh Singh died childless and was succeeded by a distant cousin, who had little use for his predecessor's confidants. Nandlal left Khetri for Agra and found that his prior career at Khetri equipped him to advise litigants regarding their legal suits. Once he realised this, he exhibited his industry and resilience again by studying for and passing the necessary examinations so that he could practice law in the British colonial courts. He then began practising law at the provincial High Court at Agra. Subsequently, the High Court was relocated to Allahabad, and the family moved to that city.

According to B.R. Nanda, by their teenage years Motilal and other sons of Gangadhar had learnt to speak English. According to historian Sarvepalli Gopal, Motilal was, like his ancestors, more fluent in Arabic, Persian, and Urdu than in any other Indian language.

== Career ==
Motilal passed the bar examination in 1883 and began practicing law at Kanpur. In 1886, he moved to Allahabad to join the lucrative practice already established by his brother Nandlal. In April 1887, his brother died at the age of 42, leaving behind five sons and two daughters. Thus Motilal at the age of 25 became sole bread-earner of the extended Nehru family.

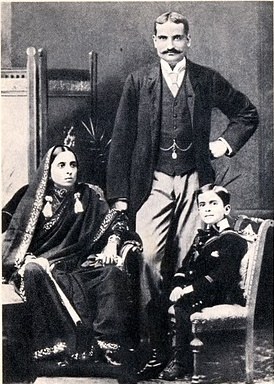
Motilal Nehru with his wife Swaruprani and young son, Jawaharlal Nehru

He frequently visited Europe which angered the Kashmiri Brahmin community, as he refused to perform the traditional prayashchit, or reformation ceremony, after crossing the ocean (according to Strict Hinduism, one lost one's caste after crossing the ocean, and was required to perform certain penance rites to regain caste). In 1899, he was even expelled from the caste for refusing to perform the penance ceremony.

He soon made a name for himself in the civil society of Allahabad. Many of Motilal's suits were civil cases concerning large land-owning families. Mahmud Manzil, 1 Church Road in the Civil Lines area of Allahabad, had originally belonged to Sir Syed Ahmad Khan, who had built it in 1871. Sir Syed Ahmad Khan was a prominent 19th century Muslim leader and educationist, and had died in 1898. With the success of his practice, Motilal Nehru bought that vast mansion in 1900 as his new family home and renamed it Anand Bhavan (lit. Joy house). At the house-warming party of Anand Bhavan, Sir William Moor had hoped that this large palatial home would become the cement holding together the British Empire in India. Paradoxically, the same house went on to become the cradle to the Indian Freedom Struggle which was to end British rule in India. In 1909, he reached the pinnacle of his legal career by gaining the approval to appear in the Privy Council of Great Britain.

He was the first chairman of the board of directors of The Leader, a leading daily published from Allahabad. On 5 February 1919 he launched a new daily paper, The Independent, as a counterpoint to The Leader, which was much too liberal for Motilal's standard and articulate thought in 1919.

=== Political career ===
Motilal Nehru started on the path to become wealthy among the few leaders of the Indian National Congress. However, to meet the expenses of his large family and large family homes, Nehru had to occasionally return to his practice of law. He twice served as President of the Congress Party, first in Amritsar (1919) and the second time in Calcutta (1928). The entry of his son Jawaharlal Nehru into politics in 1916, had already started the most powerful and influential Indian political dynasty. Under the influence of Mahatma Gandhi in 1918, Motilal became one of the first ones to transform his life to exclude western clothes and material goods, adopting a more native Indian lifestyle. The Jallianwala Bagh massacre of 1919 left a deep impression on him where it has been reported that he wrote in its aftermath: "My blood is boiling". In December 1919, he was elected to preside over the Amritsar Congress. Motilal was in the centre of the gathering storm which pulled down many familiar landmarks during the following year. In September 1920, at the special Congress at Calcutta, he was the only front rank leader to lend his support to non-co-operation. He was arrested during the Non-Cooperation Movement. Although initially close to Gandhi, he openly criticised Gandhi's suspension of civil resistance in 1922 due to the murder of policemen by a riotous mob in Chauri Chaura in Uttar Pradesh.

Motilal later joined the Swaraj Party, which sought to enter the British-sponsored councils. Motilal had been elected to the United Provinces Legislative Council where he staged the first walk-out in protest of the rejection of a resolution he had moved. In 1923, Nehru was elected to the new Central Legislative Assembly of British India in New Delhi and became leader of the Opposition. In that role, he was able to secure the defeat, or at least the delay, of Finance bills and other legislation. He agreed to join a Committee with the object of promoting the recruitment of Indian officers into the Indian Army, but this decision contributed to others going further and joining the Government itself.

In March 1926, Nehru demanded a representative conference to draft a constitution conferring full Dominion status on India, to be enacted by the British parliament. This demand was rejected by the Assembly, and as a result Nehru and his colleagues resigned their Assembly seats and returned to the Congress party.

The Calcutta Congress (December 1928), over which Motilal presided, was the scene of a head-on clash between those who were prepared to accept Dominion Status and those who would have nothing short of complete independence. A split was averted by a proposal by Mahatma Gandhi, according to which if Britain did not concede Dominion Status within a year, the Congress was to demand complete independence and to fight for it, if necessary, by launching civil disobedience.

In 1929, Jawaharlal Nehru was elected as Congress president it greatly pleased Motilal and Nehru family admirers to see the son take over from his father. Jawaharlal had opposed his father's preference for dominion status, and had not left the Congress Party when Motilal helped found the Swaraj Party.

== Nehru report ==
Motilal Nehru chaired the famous Nehru Commission in 1928, a counter to the all-British Simon Commission. The Nehru Report, the first constitution written only by Indians, envisioned a dominion status for India within the Empire, akin to Australia, New Zealand and Canada. It was endorsed by the Indian National Congress, but rejected by more nationalist Indians who sought complete independence. The report was rejected by the Muslim leadership of India, especially Muhammad Ali Jinnah over concerns that the lack of constitutional safeguards against Hindu majoritarianism created unacceptable risks for Indian Muslims.

== Death and legacy ==
Motilal Nehru's age and declining health kept him out of the historic events of 1929–1931, when the Congress adopted complete independence as its goal and when Gandhi launched the Salt Satyagraha. He was arrested and imprisoned with his son; but his health gave way and he was released. In the last week of January 1931 Gandhi and the Congress Working Committee were released by the Government as a gesture in that chain of events which was to lead to the Gandhi-lrwin Pact. Motilal had the satisfaction of having his son and Gandhi beside him in his last days. On 6 February 1931 he died.

Motilal Nehru is remembered for being the patriarch of India's most powerful political dynasty which has since produced three Prime Ministers. Two of his great-great-grandsons, Rahul Gandhi, and Varun Gandhi are members of the lower house of Indian parliament, the Lok Sabha and belong to the Indian National Congress and Bharatiya Janata Party respectively.

=== Tribute ===
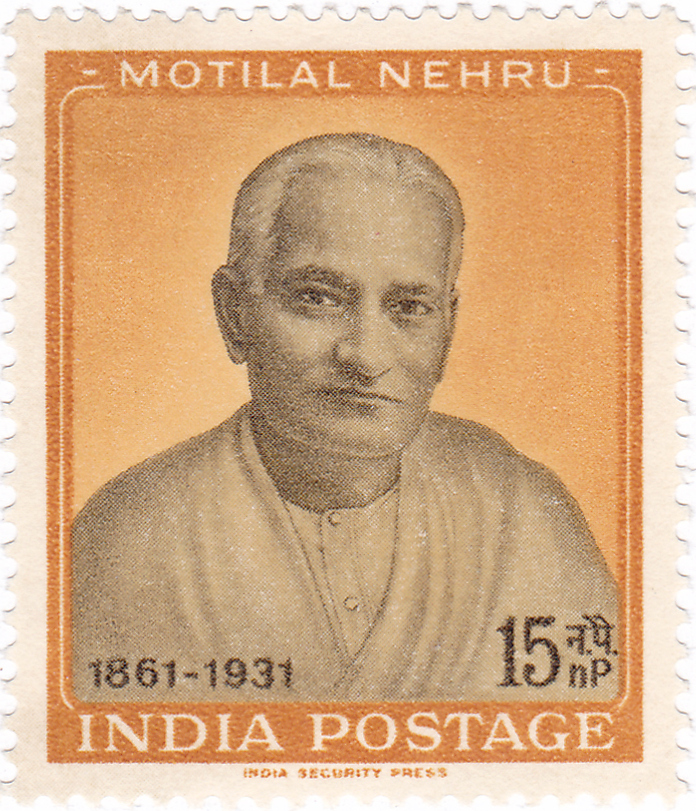
Commemorative Postal Stamp, 1961

Paying tribute to Motilal Nehru, the British Chief Justice of Allahabad High Court, Sir Grimwood Mears, stated:

He had a profusion of gifts, and as an advocate he had the art of presenting his case in its most attractive form...He had an exquisite public speaking voice and a charm of manner which made it a pleasure to listen to him...With his wide range of reading and the pleasure that he had taken in travel he was a very delightful private companion and wherever he sat at a table there was the head of the table and there was the centre of interest. He has left behind a very great reputation in this court and his name will always be associated with this Court and be one of the traditions of this Court.

== Works ==
- The Voice of Freedom: Selected Speeches of Pandit Motilal Nehru. ed. Kavalam Madhava Panikkar, A. Pershad. Asia Pub. House, 1961
- Motilal Nehru: Essays and Reflections on His Life and Times, by Preet Chablani. S. Chand, 1961.
- Selected Works of Motilal Nehru (volumes 1–6), ed. Ravinder Kumar, D. N. Panigrahi. Vikas Pub., 1995. ISBN 0-7069-1885-1.

== Biographies ==
- Bhattacharyya, Upendra Chandra; Chakravarty, Shovendu Sunder (1934). Pandit Motilal Nehru: His Life and Work. Modern Book Agency. OCLC 82455581.
- Goswami, D.C.; Nayak, R.K.; Singh, Shankar Dayal (1976). Pandit Motilal Nehru, a Great Patriot. National Forum of Lawyers and Legal Aid. OCLC 2799459.
- Jain, A. Pershad; Suri, Promilla (1961). Motilal Nehru: A Short Political Biography. S. Chand. OCLC 1318940.
- Nanda, Bal Ram (1964). Motilal Nehru. Publications Division, Ministry of Information and Broadcasting, Govt. of India. OCLC 773250260.
- Nanda, B. R. (2007). The Nehrus: Motilal and Jawaharlal. Oxford University Press. ISBN 978-0-19-908793-8.
