= Central Cottage Industries Emporium =

Department store in New Delhi, India

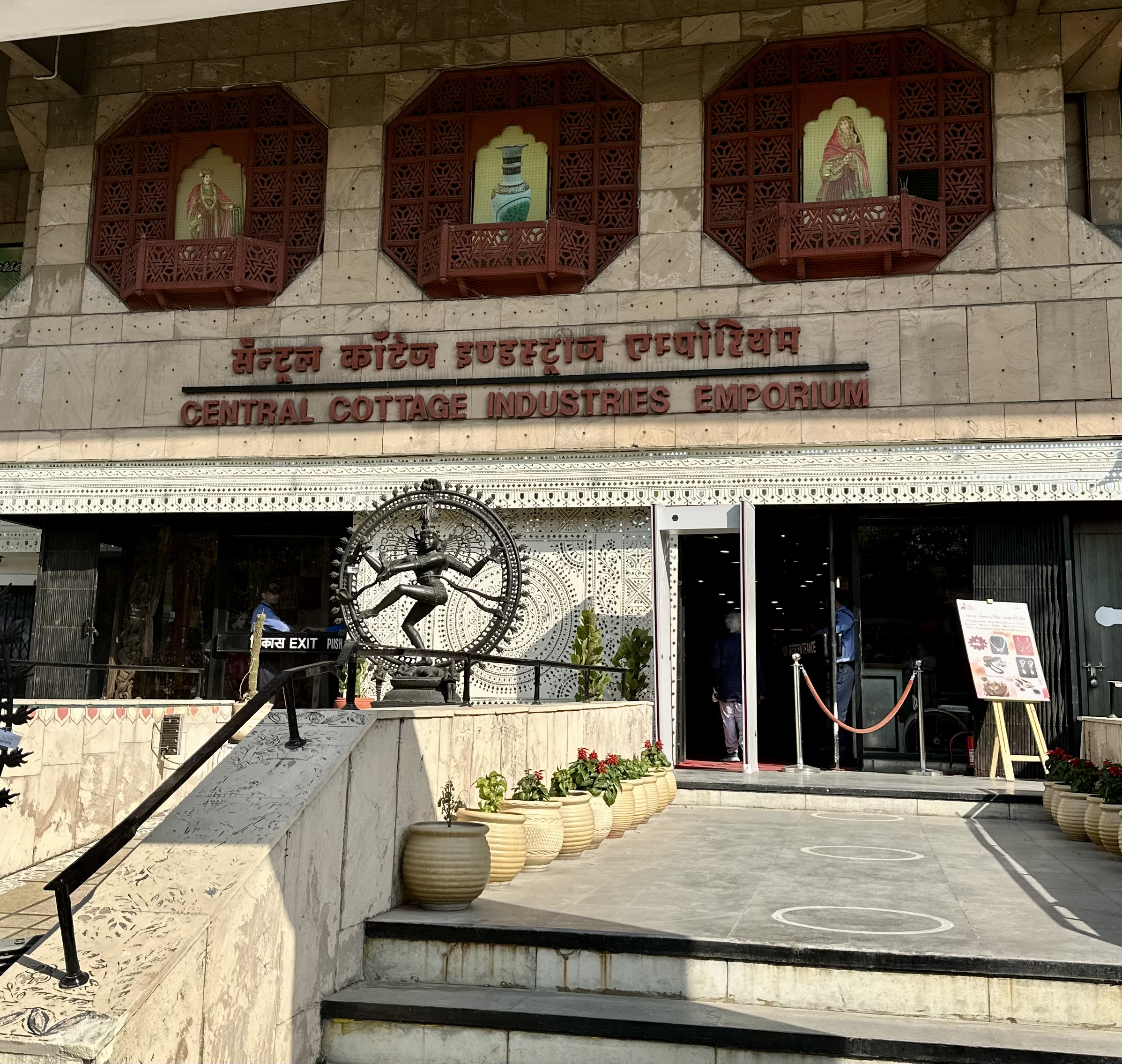
- Flagship store frontage, New Delhi
- Nickname: Cottage
- Formation: 1948
- Founders: Ministry of Commerce and Industry, India; Kamaladevi Chattopadhyay; Fori Nehru; Kitty Shiva Rao; Prem Bery; Achamma Mathai
- Founded at: Janpath, New Delhi
- Merger of: Refugee Handicrafts
- Location: New Delhi, India
- Coordinates: 28°37′33″N 77°13′12″E
- Products: Indian arts and handicrafts
- Owner: Indian Government
- Website: cottageemporium.in

Central Cottage Industries Emporium (CCIE), also known as the Cottage and Cottage Emporium, is an Indian Government owned arts and crafts flagship department store and cultural center in Janpath, New Delhi, India. It works to preserve declining arts and craft forms, and provides support to craftspersons. Indian handicrafts sold there come from several Indian States, and include Bankura silver, tea, dress material, clothing, accessories, and decorative furnishings.

The Cottage was created in Delhi in 1948 by the Indian Government's Central Ministry of Industry and Commerce. After making an initial loss, India's then Primeminister Jawaharlal Nehru, asked Kamaladevi Chattopadhyay of the Indian Cooperative Union (ICU) to take over its management. In 1952 the Cottage incorporated 'Refugee Handicrafts', an employment agency formed in 1947 by Fori Nehru, Kitty Shiva Rao, Achamma Mathai, and Prem Bery, arranged to provide paid work to the then recent influx of refugee women from Punjab following the partition of India. The two organisations merged in 1952 and Chattopadhyay became its first president.

Past visitors have included Jacqueline Kennedy, Catherine Galbraith, Elizabeth II, Prince Philip, Queen Farah of Iran and Margaret Thatcher.

== Location and architecture ==
The Central Cottage Industries Emporium (CCIE), affectionately known as the Cottage, is a several floor cultural center and arts and craft department store owned by the Indian Government and located in Janpath, New Delhi. Its logo is the Bankura horse.

== History ==
=== Origins ===
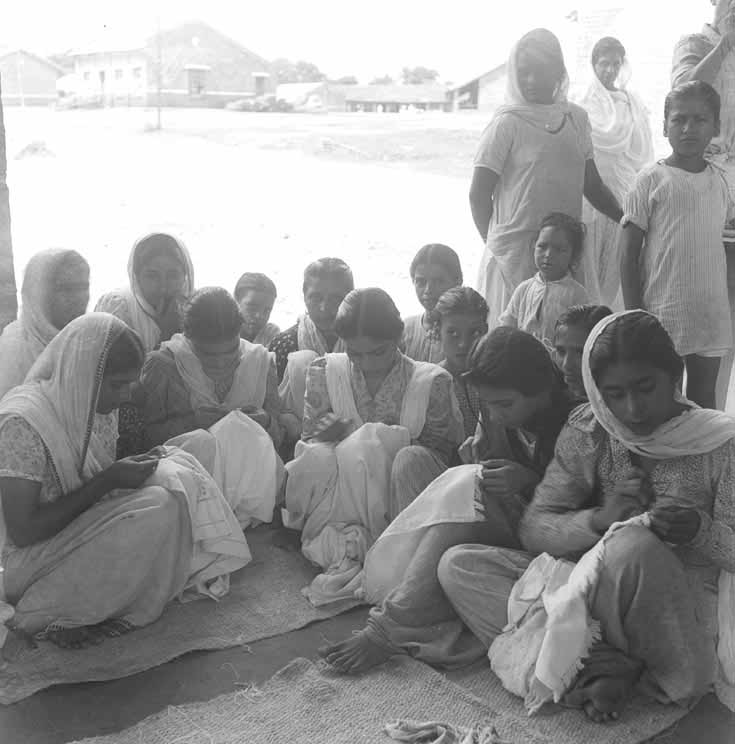
Women refugees at the Kingsway Camp, Delhi, sewing and knitting, September 1947

The Cottage was established in 1948 by the Indian Government's Central Ministry of Industry and Commerce in the old American barracks at Janpath. After making a loss of around 40,000 to 60,000 rupees/year in the first couple of years, India's then Prime minister, Jawaharlal Nehru, asked Kamaladevi Chattopadhyay of the Indian Cooperative Union (ICU) to manage it. (Note: Chattopadhyay, in the search for a longterm solution to rehabilitate refugees, co-founded the ICU with Lakshmi Jain, after visiting the Kingsway Camp in February 1948, where she praised the short term relief provided by the volunteers of Refugee Handicrafts. The ICU subsequently expanded over the next few years, recruiting high profile figures that included K. A. D. Naorji from the Tata Group, Bharat Ram from Delhi Cloths, Burma Shell's G. D. Mehra, and Indira Gandhi.)

In 1951 Chattopadhyay asked Fori Nehru of the more successful Refugee Handicrafts employment agency if they would also come under the management of the ICU. Refugee Handicrafts, a sewing and embroidery venture, had been founded by Fori Nehru, Kitty Shiva Rao, Achamma Mathai, and Prem Bery, to assist refugee families, by taking materials to refugee women at the camps including the Kingsway Camp. There, refugee women would knit, sew, embroider, cut, and stitch a range of products which would be sold first by door to door sales, then from April 1948 at the Refugee Handicrafts make-shift counter lent to them at Patel Brothers in Connaught Place, and later from a building on Barakhamba Road. Fori Nehru accepted and in January 1952 the ICU moved Refugee Handicrafts to Janpath and shortly after merged the two. At the Cottage in March 1952 the ICU appointed Bery as director of exports of ready-to-wear clothes. In that role, she was typically responsible for hosting state visitors there.

Management of the new Cottage was officially taken over by the ICU in October 1952, though it remained government owned. Chattopadhyay became its founding president and in the same year co-founded its advisory panel, the All India Handicrafts Board (AIHB). Other key people included Seena Kaul, Mrs Teji Vir Singh, and Lakshmi Jain, the ICU's male general secretary. Several, including Fori Nehru, Shiva Rao and Pupul Jayakar, were voluntary workers. Chattopadhyay and the Cottage's buyers would visit villages across India looking for crafts to develop. Frequently, their roles overlapped between the Cottage, the ICU, and the AIHB.

=== Early years ===
Thousands of female craftspeople, hundreds of paid saleswomen and buyers, and a significant number of other volunteers and American women from Delhi's diplomatic community, became involved. Indian and American middle class women became the main consumers, producing what came to be termed the "Cottage look". The early years of the reorganised Cottage saw particular activity with the US, with Chattopadhyay forming deals with American social reformers and Fori Nehru, now appointed 'Chairman of the Export Section of the Government of India in America', encouraging Indian fashion shows and exhibitions in Washington DC. (Note: Fori Nehru spent time in Washington between 1949 and 1952 as wife of the Indian ambassador to the USA.) Nelson Rockefeller, then director of the American International Association (AIA), upon hearing about the promising leadership of the Cottage, sent his AIA staff member Thomas Keehn, to be full time advisor to the ICU in India. By that time Primeminister Nehru dubbed the Cottage as a "modern monument of Delhi like the Kutub of the old era", and added it to the list of places to go to for foreign dignitaries, and to the Ministry of External Affairs's list of places to obtain official state gifts. Keehn reached India in 1953 and set up his office on the second floor of the Cottage. By 1954, Paris, Seattle, Cairo, London and Sao Paulo, had all hosted Indian handicraft exhibitions. On 13 April 1955 an exhibition titled "Textile and Ornamental Arts of India," opened on 53rd Street at MoMA's, organised by Jayakar, then member of the Cottage's Bombay branch.

=== Notable visitors ===
In 1953, at the request of the Indian government, Bery was responsible for arranging an exhibition and sales of Indian handicrafts for the Coronation of Elizabeth II in London. On 28 January 1961 the Queen and her husband both visited the Cottage during their state visit to India. During Jacqueline Kennedy's 1962 goodwill tour of India, Kennedy was escorted around the Cottage and shown a fashion show featuring Catherine Galbraith, wife of Ambassador J. K. Galbraith. Among others that have visited include Queen Farah of Iran, and Sehba Musharraf. Margaret Thatcher had once visited and purchased from there embroidered bed covers, Jaipuri pottery, and scarfs. When American arts specialist Margaret Merwin Patch visited Delhi in 1962, she described it as "a big store always full of local patrons" ...and ... "wives of foreign diplomats".

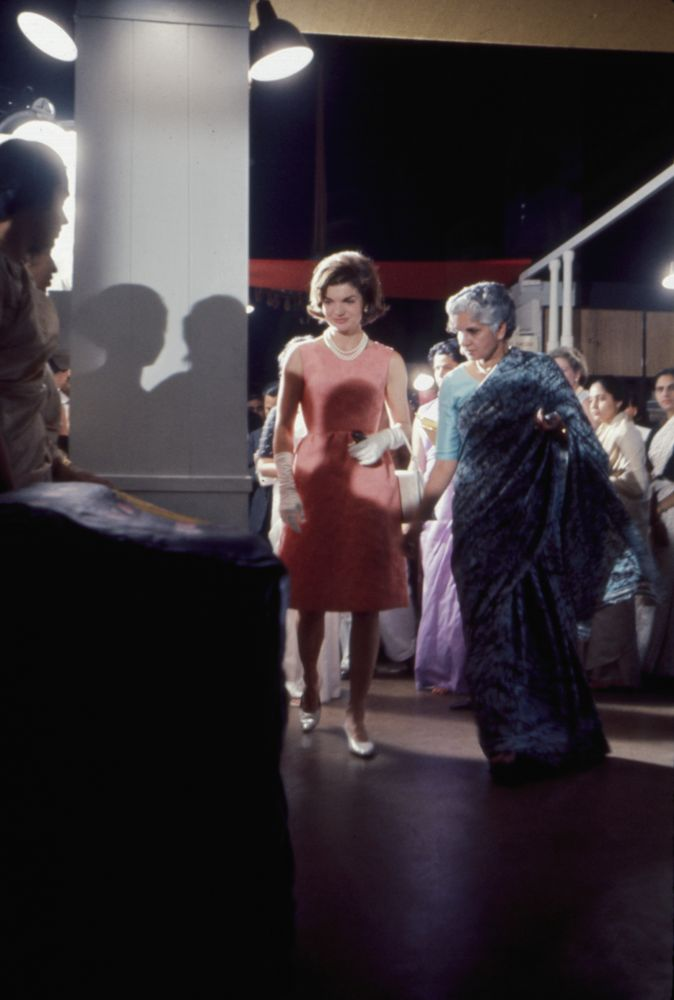
Bery escorting Kennedy (1962)

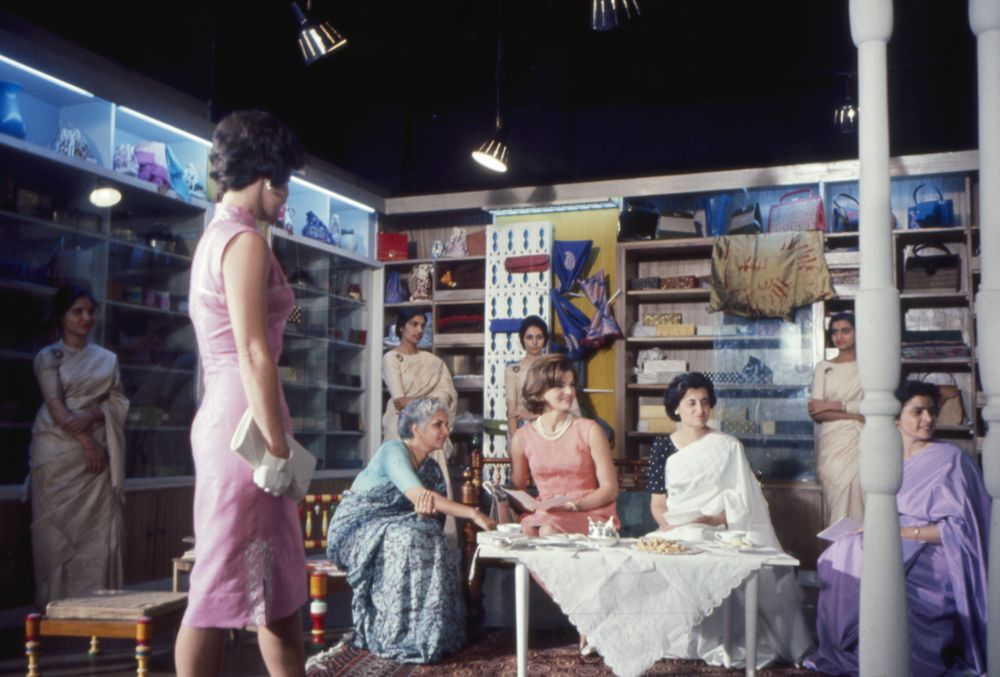
Kennedy, Bery, and Indira Gandhi (1962)

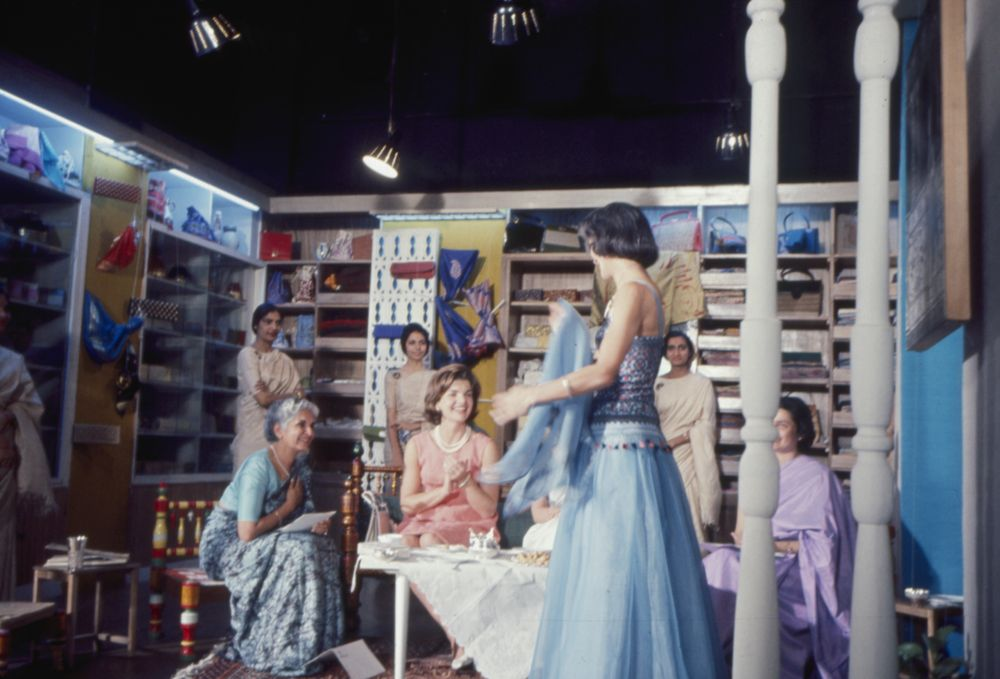
Kennedy, Berry, Gandhi, Galbraith (1962)

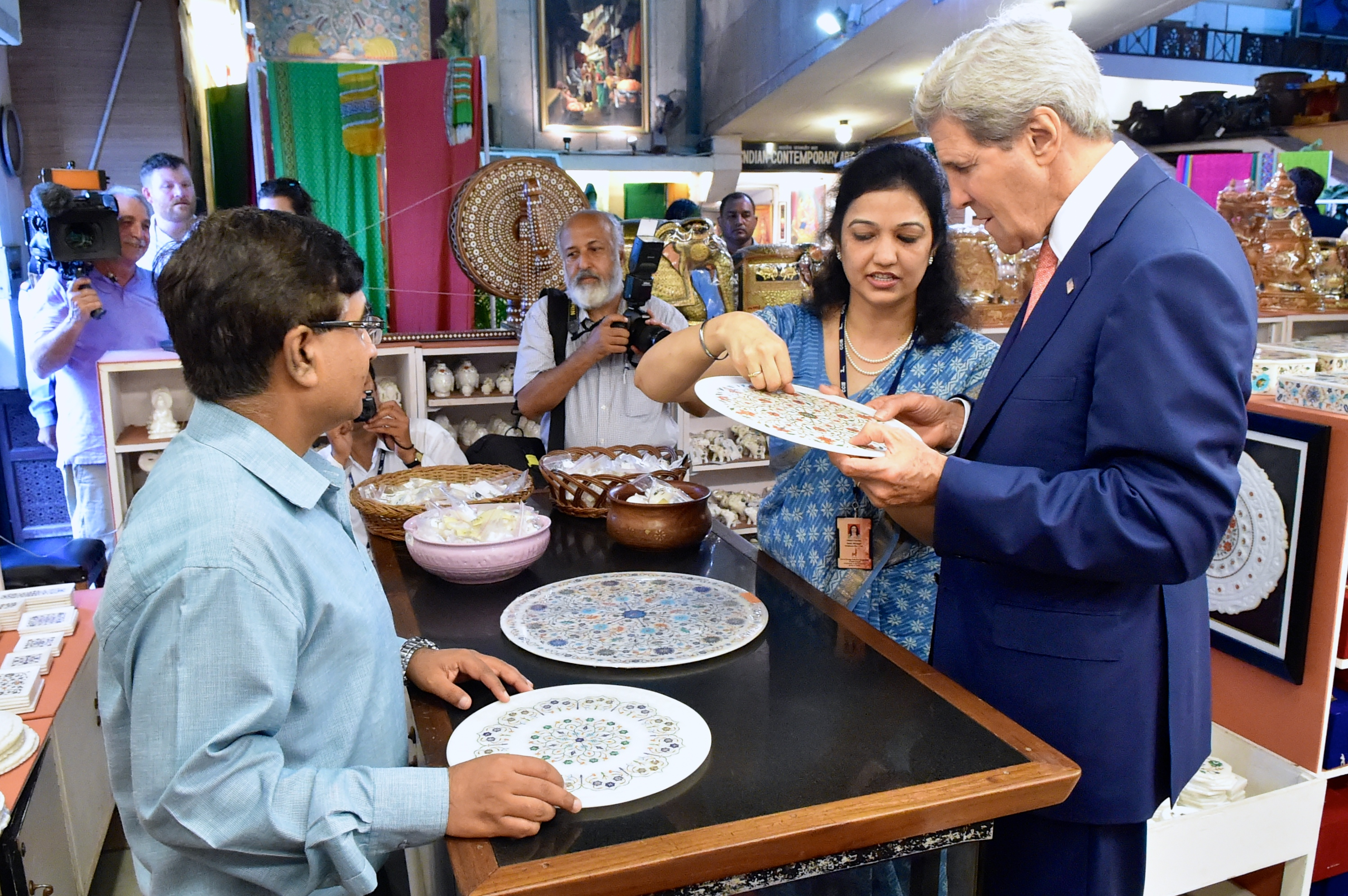
U.S. Secretary of State John Kerry (2014)

== Products ==
Indian handicrafts sold at the Cottage come from several Indian States. Products include Bankura silver, tea, dress material, clothing, accessories, decorative furnishings, and other gifts. Other products include brass ornaments, carved sandalwood figures, pashmina shawls, Kanjeevaram silks, and paintings. Traditionally made from clay, the Bankura horse can be found in the Cottage in brass. As of 2025, the Cottage works with over 5,800 arts and crafts producers, aims to preserve declining arts and craft forms, and provides support to craftspersons.

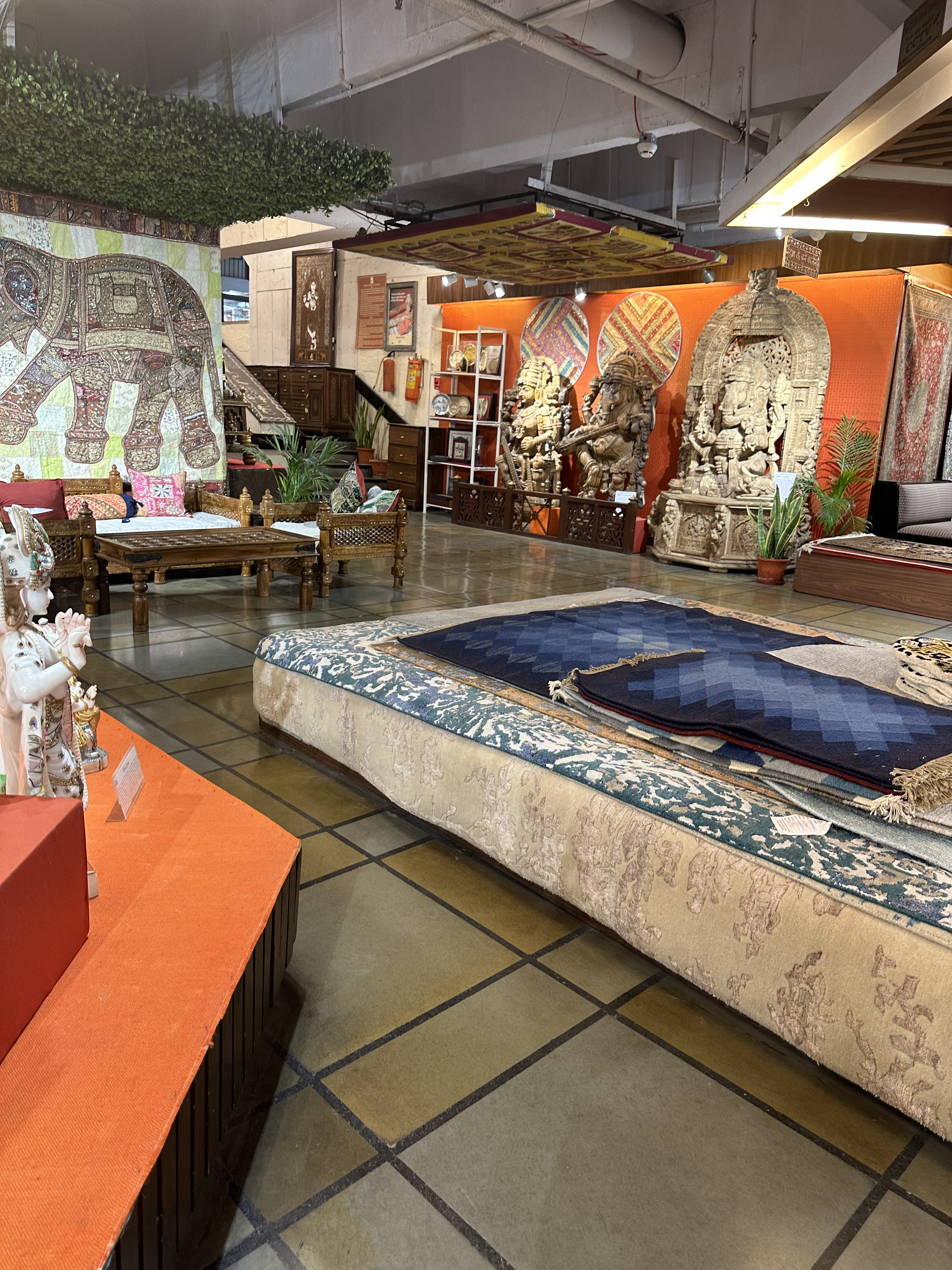

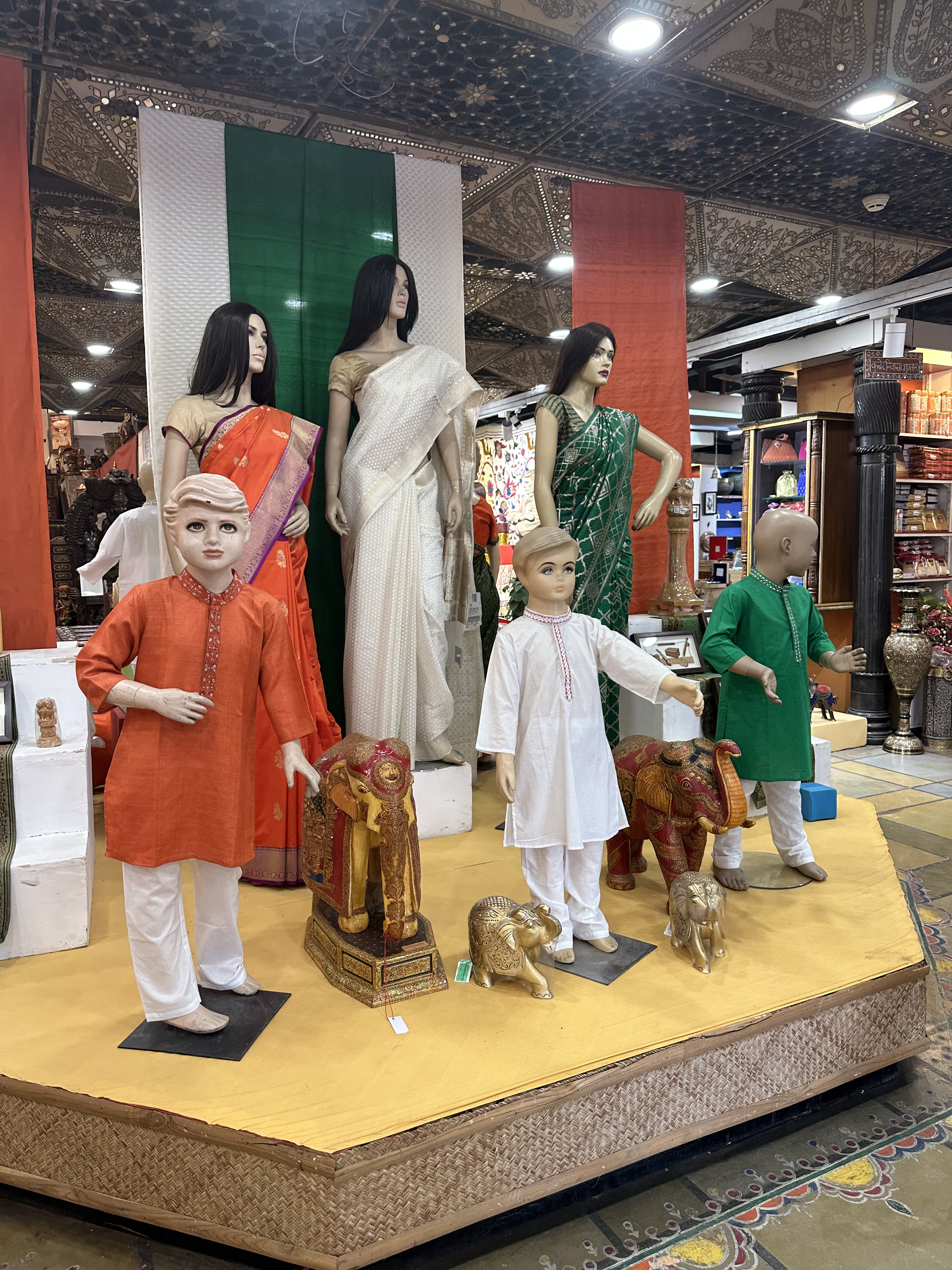

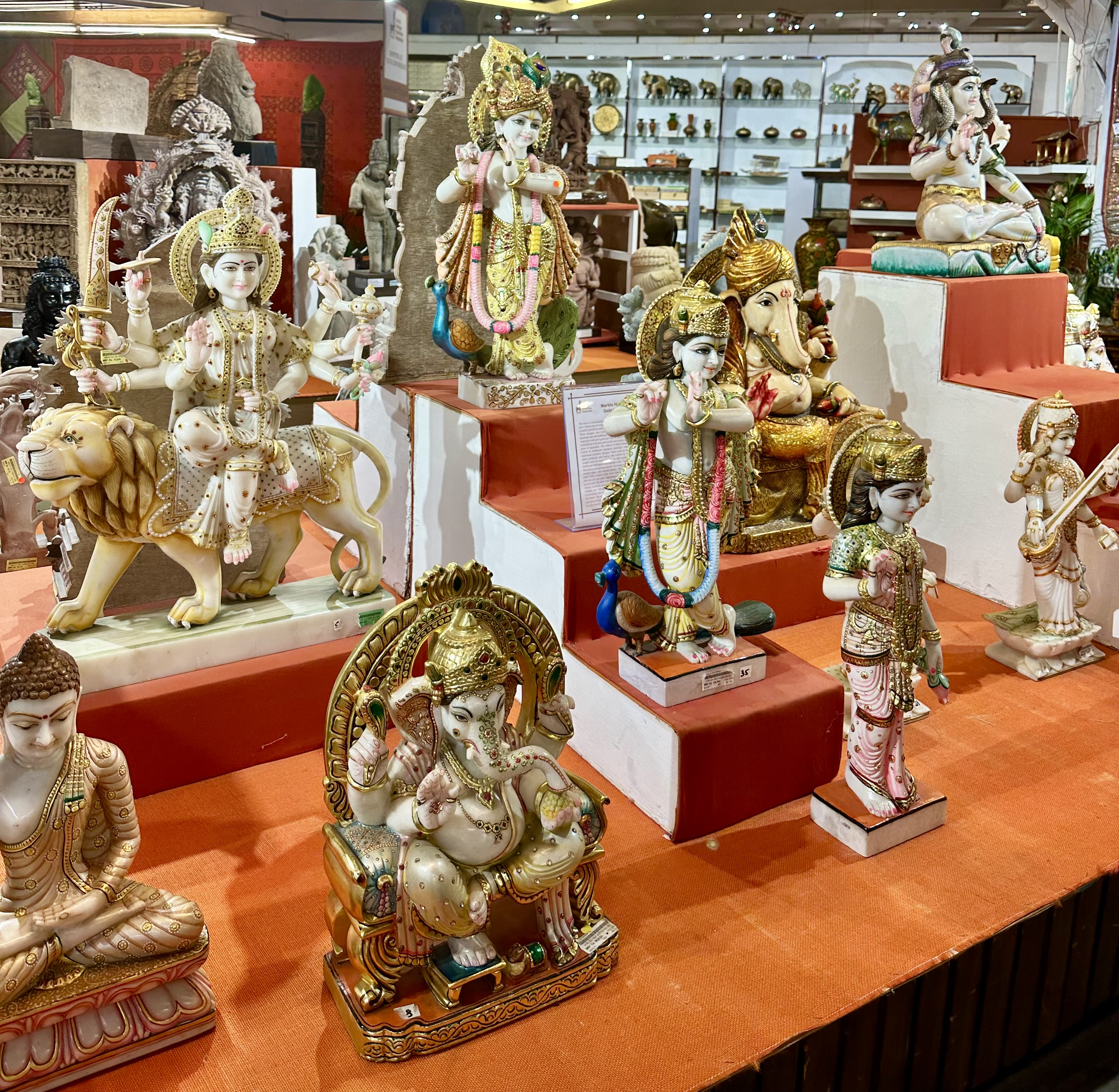

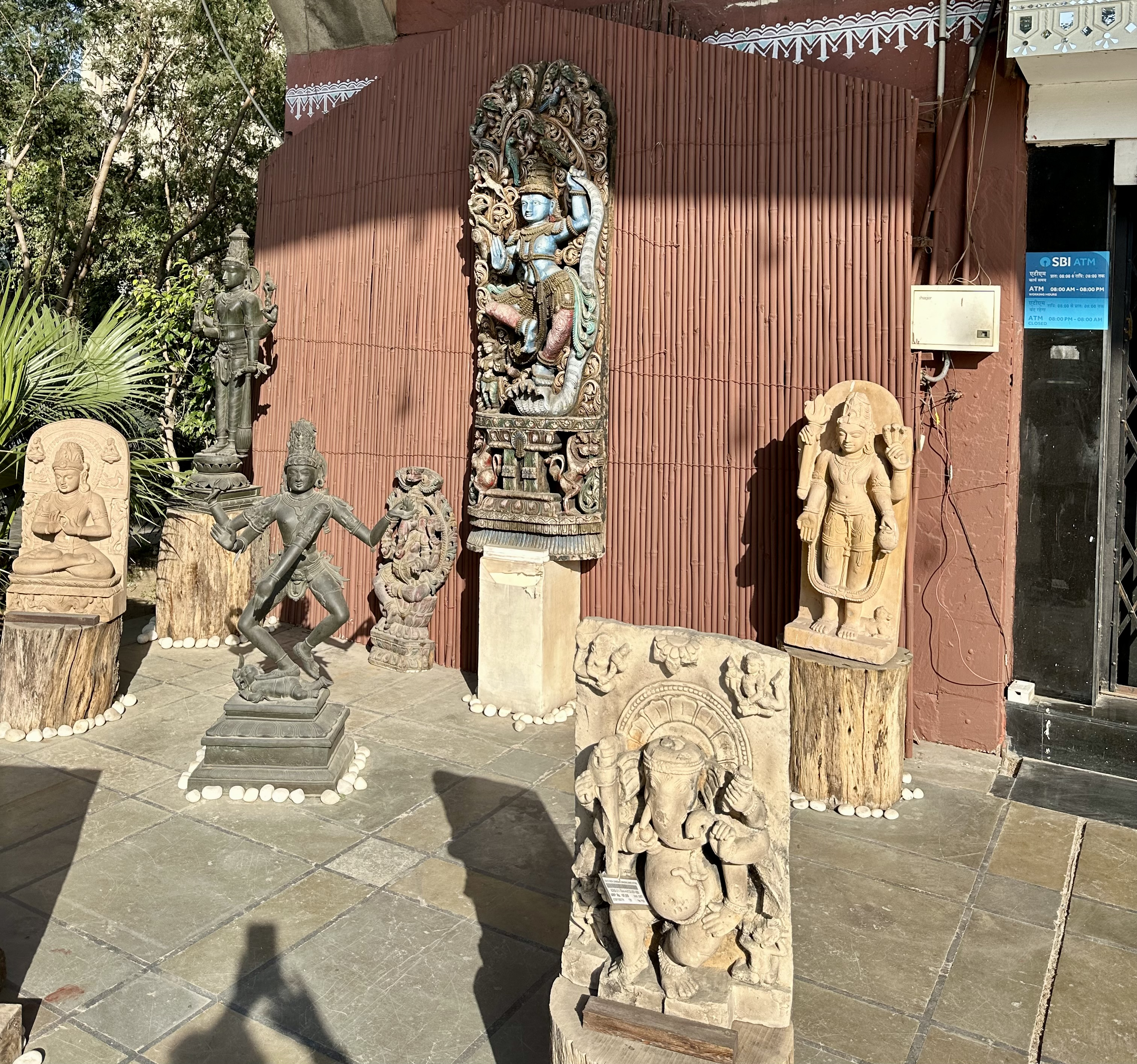

== Bibliography ==
- Chattopadhyaya, kamaladevi (1986). "11". Inner Recesses Outer Spaces Memoirs. New Delhi: Navrang. pp. 317–342. ISBN 81-7013-038-7.
