= Prem Bery =

Indian social worker and clothing exporter

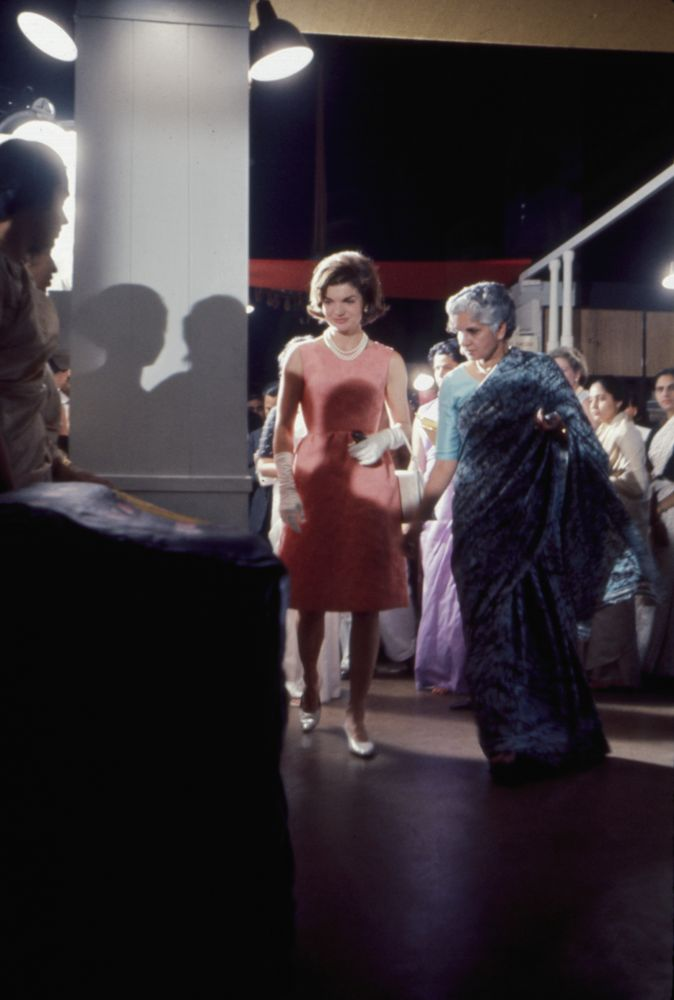
- Prem Bery (right) with Jacqueline Kennedy (centre) at the Central Cottage Industries Emporium during Kennedy's goodwill tour of India (1962)
- Known for: Social work Refugee Handicrafts; Central Cottage Industries Emporium

Prem Bery, also spelled Prem Berry, was an Indian social worker and director of exports of ready-to-wear clothes at the Central Cottage Industries Emporium (CCIE), in Janpath, New Delhi, India. She co-founded the 'Refugee Handicrafts' with Fori Nehru, Achamma Mathai and Kitty Shiva Rao in 1947, and took up the post of its honorary secretary in 1949, three years before it merged with the CCIE. In her role as director, in 1953 she was sent to London to manage an Indian handicrafts exhibition during the Coronation of Elizabeth II. Back in India, she was typically responsible for hosting state visitors.

== Biography ==
Prem Bery was from Lahore and evacuated the city in 1947. Bery's husband was the Government's dental advisor, Narendra Nath Bery. They had three children.

Bery was noted to be part of Delhi's social elite who contributed to preserving India's handicrafts. In 1947 Bery co-founded Refugee Handicrafts in Delhi with Fori Nehru, Achamma Mathai and Kitty Shiva Rao. The aim was to utilize the skills of refugee women in order to increase their family incomes. The three housewives turned social reformers provided materials for the women to sew, knit, embroider, cut and perform other needlework. They then collected the completed products and sold them from door-to-door. In 1949, Bery became the organisation's honorary secretary.

The business expanded and Inderbhai Haksar offered his shop 'Patel Brothers' in Connaught Place for the sale of the refugee merchandise. The business then moved to a building on Barakhamba Road, and later came under the Indian Cooperative Union (ICU) and relocated to the old American barracks at Janpath, where it was absorbed into the Central Cottage Industries Emporium, then being run by Kamaladevi Chattopadhyay. There, in March 1952, Bery was appointed director of exports of ready-to-wear clothes, and remained there for several years.

She also became a board member on the All India Handicrafts Board. In her role as director, the following year she was sent to London to manage an Indian handicrafts exhibition during the Coronation of Elizabeth II. Back in India she was typically responsible for the training of staff and hosting state visitors. In 1962 Bery took First Lady Jacqueline Kennedy on a tour of the CCIE during Kennedy's goodwill tour of India.

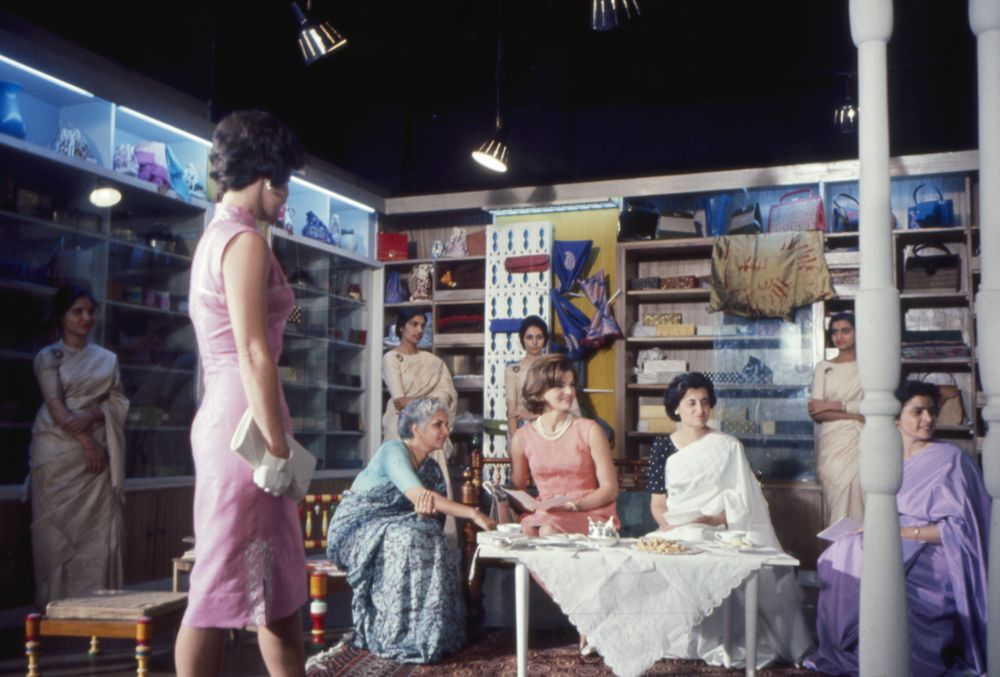
Bery with Kennedy and Indira Gandhi

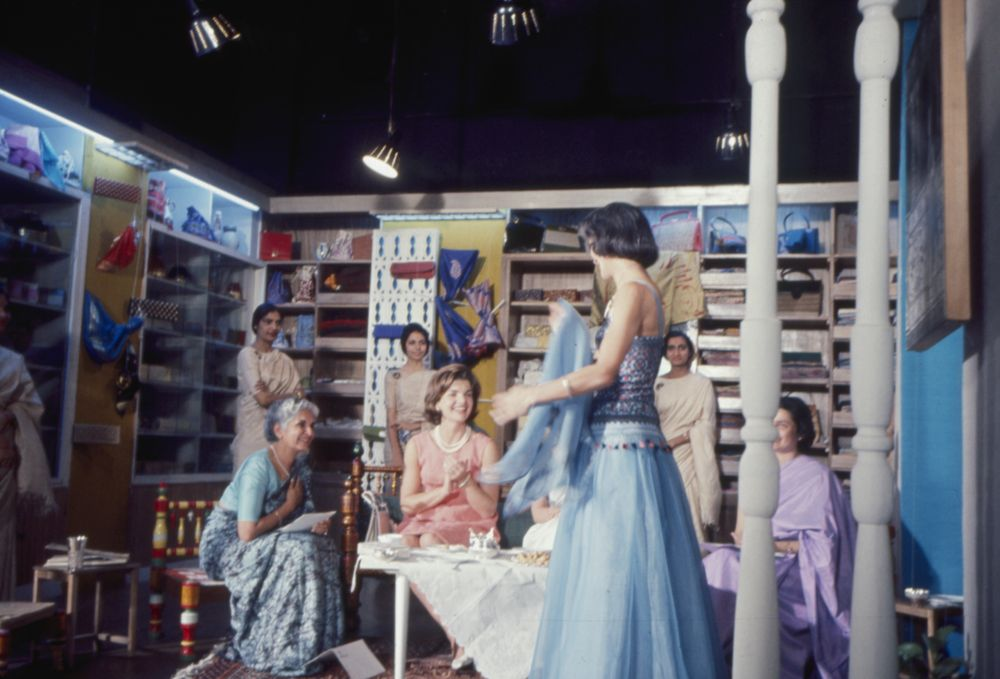
Bery with Kennedy, Catherine Galbraith and Gandhi

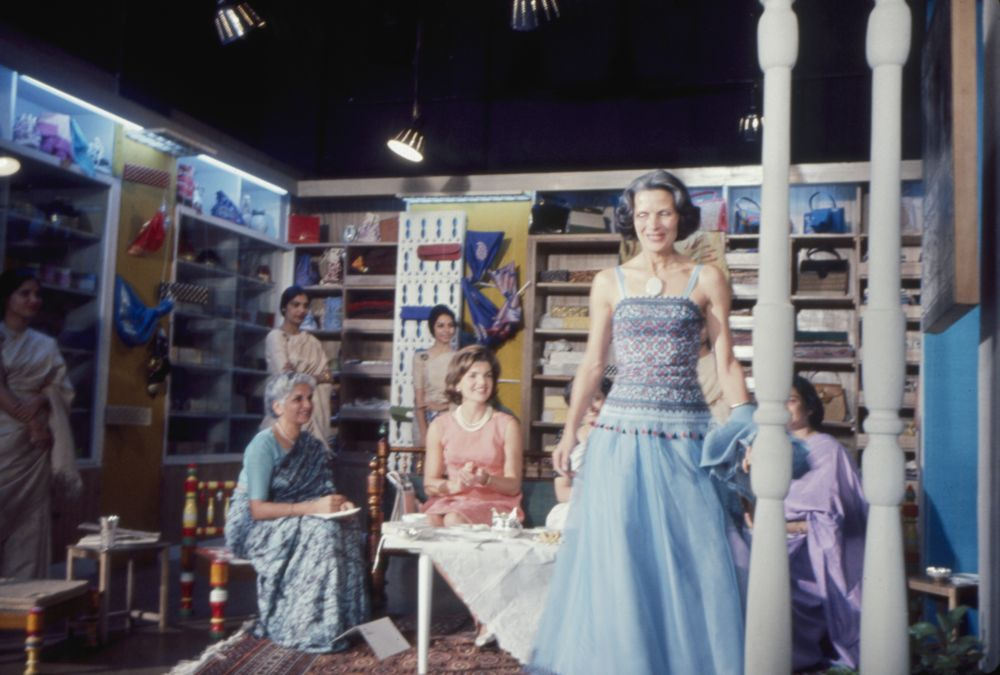
Bery with Gandhi and Galbraith
