= Fori Nehru =

Hungarian-born Indian social worker

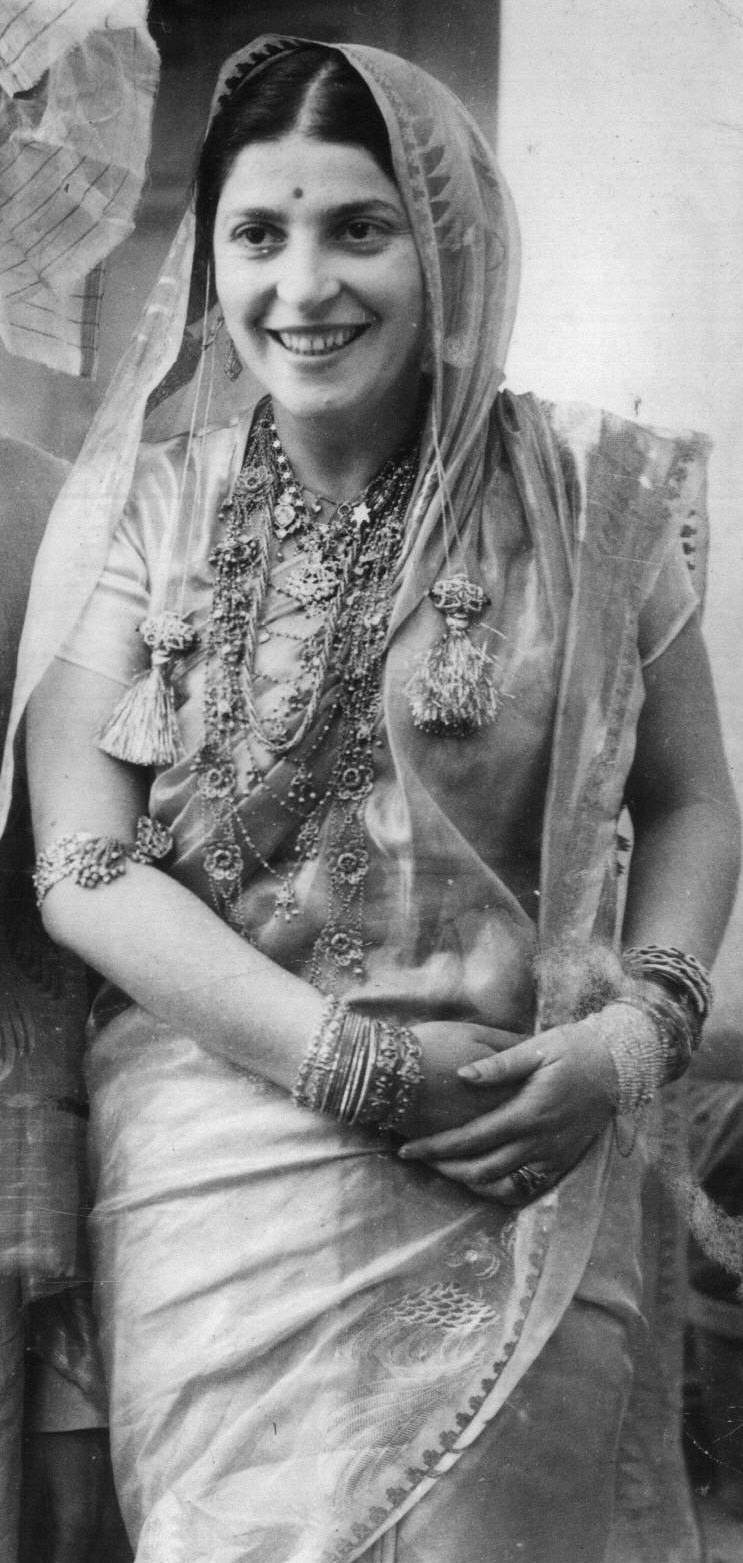
- Fori Nehru (Lahore, 1935)
- Born: Magdolna Friedmann; 5 December 1908; Budapest, Austro-Hungarian Empire
- Died: 5 April 2017 (aged 108); Kasauli, India
- Other names: Auntie Fori, Mrs. B.K. Nehru, Shobha Nehru
- Citizenship: Hungary (former); India
- Education: London School of Economics
- Known for: Social work Founder Refugee Handicrafts
- Board member of: Delhi Emergency Committee (1947); All India Handicrafts Board
- Spouse: Braj Kumar Nehru
- Children: 3
- Parents: Armin Friedmann (father); Regina, née Hirshfeld (mother)
- Family: See Nehru family

Shobha Nehru, commonly known as Fori Nehru and Auntie Fori (born Magdolna Friedmann; 5 December 1908 – 25 April 2017), was a Hungarian-born Indian social worker and the wife of the Indian civil servant Braj Kumar Nehru of the Nehru family.

In 1947, following the partition of India, Nehru was the only female member on the Emergency Committee, to assist in the protection and transport of Muslims in Delhi who had sought refuge in the camps at Purana Qila and Humayun's Tomb. She co-founded an employment campaign to sell stitched and embroidered works made by refugee women. Later she became a member of the All India Handicrafts Board and for several years worked voluntarily at the Central Cottage Industries Emporium in Delhi, promoting crafts made in India.

Nehru accompanied her husband on his travels during his civil service career and between 1958 and 1968, she was present with him when he was appointed India's ambassador to the United States, was in London when he became high commissioner there, and is mentioned in several memoirs as a hostess. When her husband was appointed governor of Assam in the late 1960s, she contributed to the supervision of refugees in Bengal during the 1971 war. In 1976, she was one of a very few close to the then Prime Minister of India, Indira Gandhi, that confronted her about the forces used during the Emergency. Nehru was noted to speak a high standard of Hindi and for always wearing a saree. In 1989, she moved to Kasauli with her husband, where they lived their remaining lives.

In 1998, after asking her son's university friend and Winston Churchill's official biographer, Sir Martin Gilbert, to recommend a book about the history of the Jews, he responded by writing Nehru a letter every week for 140 weeks, each addressed "Dear Auntie Fori". The letters were published in a collection titled Letters to Auntie Fori (2002), in which he traced 5,000 years of Jewish history.

== Early life and education ==
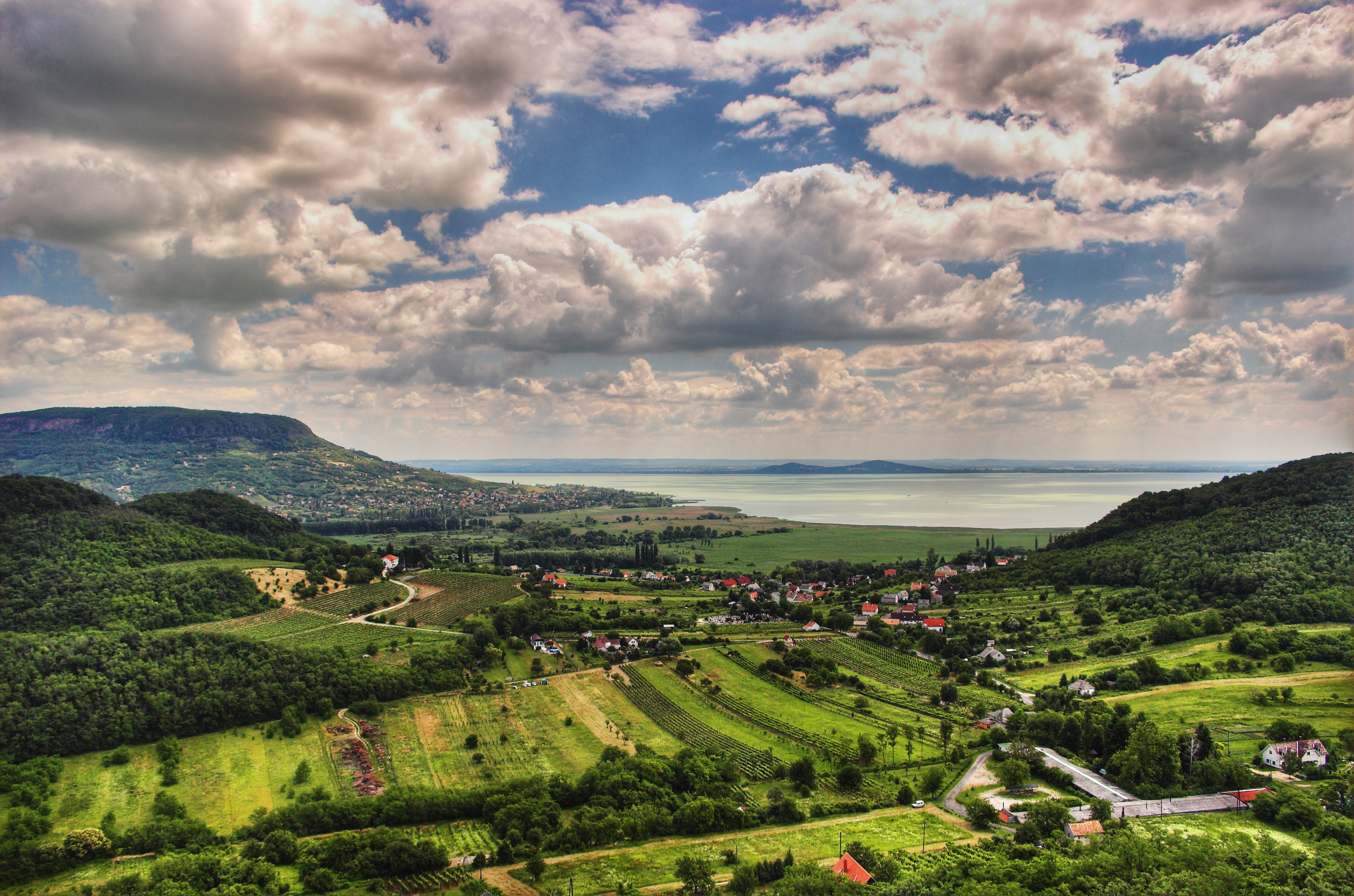
Lake Balaton, where Fori Nehru's family had a house

Fori Nehru, sometimes spelled Fory, and also known as Auntie Fori, was born Magdolna Friedmann on 5 December 1908 in Budapest, then part of the Austro-Hungarian Empire. Her father, Armin Friedmann, had a seat somewhere between row three and five at the Dohány Street Synagogue and her mother Regina, née Hirshfeld, was a member of the notable wealthy Bettelheim family, who made toys and earned the right to use the prefix von. Her father also owned a house on Lake Balaton. As a child, she was affectionately known as "Dundi", meaning a little fat girl, according to Nehru. The treatment of Jews in Hungary at the time, led to the family changing their name to Forbath, which in turn led to the nickname of 'Fori' at school. After laws changed requiring a change back to Friedman, she remained 'Fori' to those around her. She was still a young school girl when the Red Revolution broke out in Hungary in 1919, following which she recalled that her father was on a committee, guarded the streets and regularly travelled to villages. At the time, one of her troubling memories was of seeing people hanged from trees.

In 1928 at the age of 20, she was refused a place at Budapest University due to the Jewish quota which restricted the number of Jews who could enrol, so her parents sent her to study at first in France and then at the London School of Economics (LSE) in the United Kingdom. In 1930 in the LSE history library she met and fell in love with B. K. Nehru, a Kashmiri Pandit of the Nehru family, who was studying for the Indian Civil Service exams. (Note: B.K. Nehru (B.K.) was first-cousin-once-removed of Jawaharlal Nehru. He is sometimes referred to as Jawaharlal's nephew.)

== Early years in India ==
In 1932, the parents of both B. K. Nehru and Fori met in Budapest. (Note: His parents were Brijlal Nehru and Rameshwari Nehru.) Two years later, in January 1934, she travelled to India for a trial period with the Nehru family. It was agreed that should she not fit in in India, she would be allowed to return to Hungary. After taking Hindi lessons from at first B. K. Nehru and then Indologist Ervin Baktay, she arrived in Bombay on the Lloyd Triestino in February 1934, before taking a train to Lahore. The year with the Nehru family was a success and according to later recollections "the Nehru family fell in love with her". In Allahabad she was welcomed at Anand Bhavan, the family home, by Swarup Rani Nehru, who was by this time quite frail and elderly. When she visited Jawaharlal Nehru in prison, he affectionately welcomed her, telling her not to cry at his situation "In this family we keep stiff upper lip". (Note: The reply regarding crying came via a letter after the prison visit as confirmed in her recollection years later.) She married B. K. Nehru in Lahore on 25 January 1935 and was renamed Shobha. (Note: Under British Imperial law in India, people of different faiths were not permitted to marry; both would have had to renounce their faith before being allowed to marry. Gandhi intervened in this case.) According to her husband, to ensure the marriage was widely known about, photographs of the wedding were featured in several newspapers. (Note: According to Braj's autobiography, widespread media coverage of a wedding proved it happened, and avoided later disputes.) Subsequently, she was also referred to as Mrs. B. K. Nehru. During these years Mahatma Gandhi inspired her to learn about Indian handicrafts. She later recalled that when she first came to India, wealthy women wore French chiffons, "there was hardly anything made in India. Isn't it strange that at that time no Indian craft was considered beautiful – only things imported from England and Paris".

During the interwar years and subsequent years, Nehru lost many friends in the Holocaust. All her immediate family survived. Her father survived with the help of his German housekeeper. Her mother escaped from the Nazis, travelled to India the day before World War II broke out, and lived with Nehru in India throughout the war. One of her maternal uncles emigrated to British Mandatory Palestine, the younger uncle, a philatelist and poet, moved to Tangier, and her younger sister emigrated to Australia. Her brother Joseph was an officer in the Hungarian army and survived with the assistance of his unit Captain. He later escaped from Hungary by swimming across the Danube to Czechoslovakia.

From her early years in India, Nehru became acquainted with other Hungarian women in India, including the wife of Umrao Singh Sher-Gil Majithia, Marie Antoinette, who she first met when living in Simla in 1935–36. Later, she would salvage some of the paintings by Antoinette's daughter, Amrita Sher-Gil, who died in 1941; one was a famous self-portrait. She remained friends with Amrita's sister, Indira, and later helped translate several of her Hungarian letters for Vivan Sundaram's biography of Amrita. By the time of India's independence, she had lived in several Indian cities including Allahabad, Delhi, Hissar, Ambala and Lahore.

== Early post-independence years ==
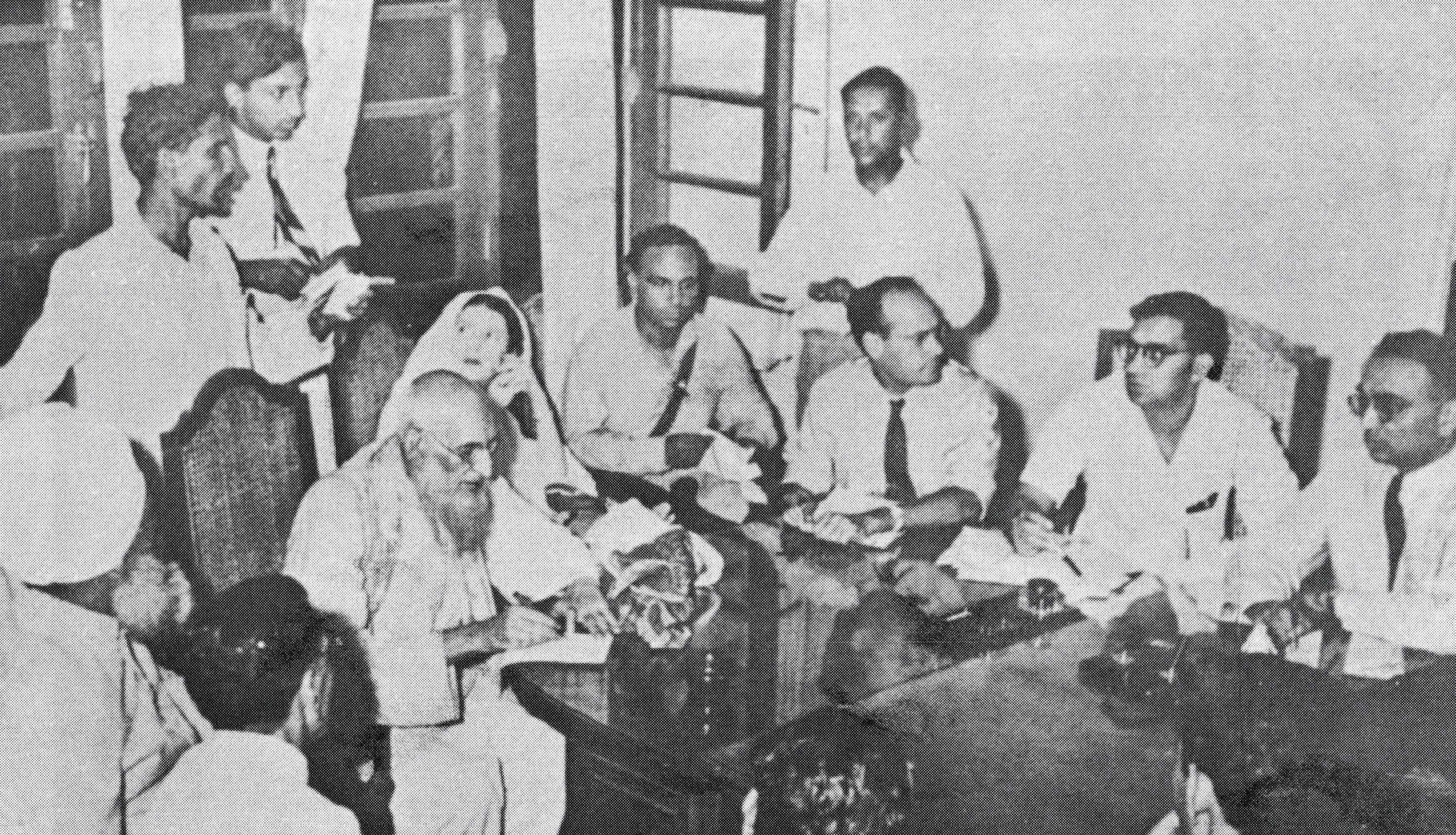
The Emergency Committee Control Room, Delhi, September 1947

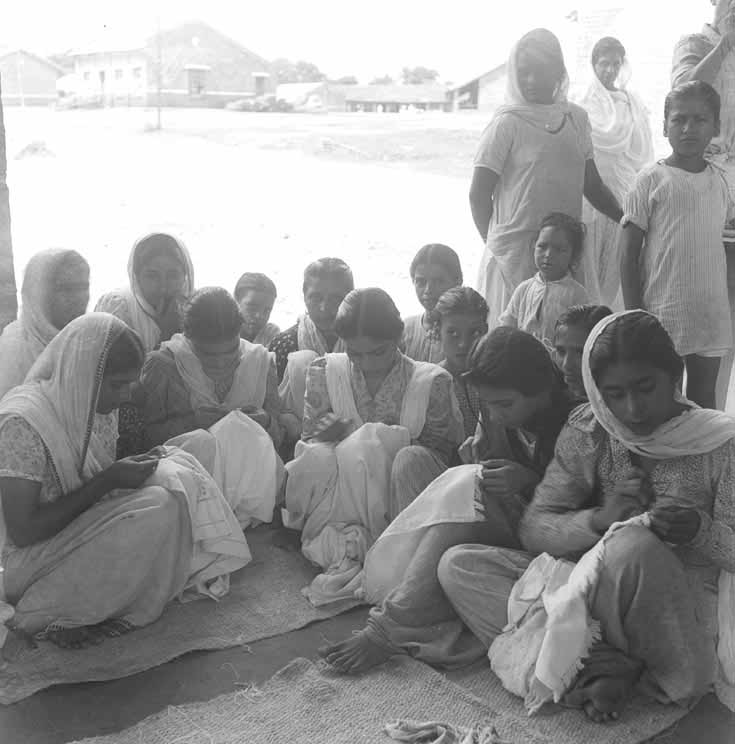
Women refugees at the Kingsway Camp, Delhi, sewing and knitting, September 1947

In 1947, following the partition of India, she took to social work. On 11 September 1947 she was appointed as the only female member to the Emergency Committee to assist in the protection and transport of Muslims in Delhi who had sought refuge in the camps at Purana Qila and Humayun's Tomb. (Note: Between 90,000 and 100,000 refugees were housed in Purana Qila and 62,000 in Humayun's Tomb in 1947.) When one of the trains that she helped board with families were all dragged off and killed, she couldn't face sending another for several days, she recalled. Along with Kitty Shiva Rao and Prem Bery, she began an employment campaign, 'Refugee Handicrafts', for the purpose of supplementing the income of refugee families. The three housewives took materials to the refugee women, who used their skills in embroidery, needlework, sewing and cutting. Patel Brothers in Connaught Place lent them one of their counters. They later moved to a shop on Barakhamba Road, which continued to operate until 1952, when it moved to Janpath and merged with the Central Cottage Industries Emporium. That year, Nehru became a member of the All India Handicrafts Board (AIHB) at the request of Kamaladevi Chattopadhyay. Thousands of displaced women in the Delhi camps had contributed to producing the handicrafts, including the one at Kingsway. The Indian artist Anjolie Ela Menon recalled that post independence, Nehru was one of a small group of women "who took it upon themselves to preserve and develop handicrafts and the handloom industry, without any remuneration".

In 1948, she was asked by Jawaharlal Nehru to take care of the foreign diplomats at the funeral of Mahatma Gandhi. The following year she left Refugee Handcrafts to move to Washington with her husband. In the same year, she took her three sons to visit Hungary. Her son Ashok, recalled her tears ..."She used to go out every day, to meet her friends...many of them had disappeared". She later said "I have a feeling of guilt," ... "I wasn't there. I was safe. The guilt feeling is still with me. Why should I not have suffered?"

Nehru visited Delhi in 1952 and was back in the US in 1953, using her time and influence there to promote Indian handicrafts. Her samples included art from the Heritage crafts village Raghurajpur. The founders of Fabindia, became interested after seeing some samples of the Indian work when Nehru met one of them in 1953, but any further progression in promoting them was hampered by the 90% import duty on embroidered crafts at the time in the US. In 1954, she returned to India, where she remained until 1958. During this time she worked as a volunteer at the Emporium. In 1958 she resigned from the AIHB as her husband was posted to Washington as India's Ambassador, upon which she was appointed chairman of the Cottage Industries Export Committee of the Ministry of Commerce, Government of India. She subsequently persuaded Lord & Taylor, Macy's and Neiman Marcus to take interest in India's cottage industries.

== Wife of an Indian official ==
Throughout her husband's career, Nehru accompanied him in his posts as governor of several parts of East India including Assam, Nagaland Manipur, Tripura and Meghalaya. After time in London as high commissioner there, he was appointed governor of Jammu and Kashmir and then Gujarat, and later worked with the United Nations.

An advocate of the rhythm method of contraception, she approached Margaret Sanger in 1952, to ask for assistance to the Family Planning Association of India. On 22 March 1965, after Sanger's death, she addressed an audience of 1,000 at a ceremonial dinner in her honour, describing Sanger as "single-handedly carried the torch of responsible motherhood".

Between 1958 and 1968, as the wife of India's ambassador to the US, Nehru would act as hostess. In one memoir, Marian Cannon Schlesinger called her more Indian than the Indians. She was noted to speak a high standard of Hindi and for always wearing a saree. Lady Bird Johnson noted in her diaries that when she accompanied President Lyndon B. Johnson, Nehru and her husband to a memorial for Jawaharlal Nehru at the Washington National Cathedral in the summer of 1964, she was most moved by the grief expressed by Nehru, "not Indian at all, Hungarian". In 1966, she hosted a dinner "that would break the ice" between then Prime Minister of India, Indira Gandhi, and US President Johnson.

When her husband was posted as governor of Assam, she contributed to assisting with the supervision of refugees in Bengal during the 1971 war. In his autobiography, Jayanta Bagchi, who was awarded the Padma Sri for his services in the relief effort of Bengali refugees said that Nehru "helped me a lot in relief matters and also civil defence matters and whenever I had a problem, I went to her". According to him, the story of the efforts in the relief operations is incomplete without mentioning her. When in Kashmir, she led the province's family planning association and in setting up schools for Buddhist children.

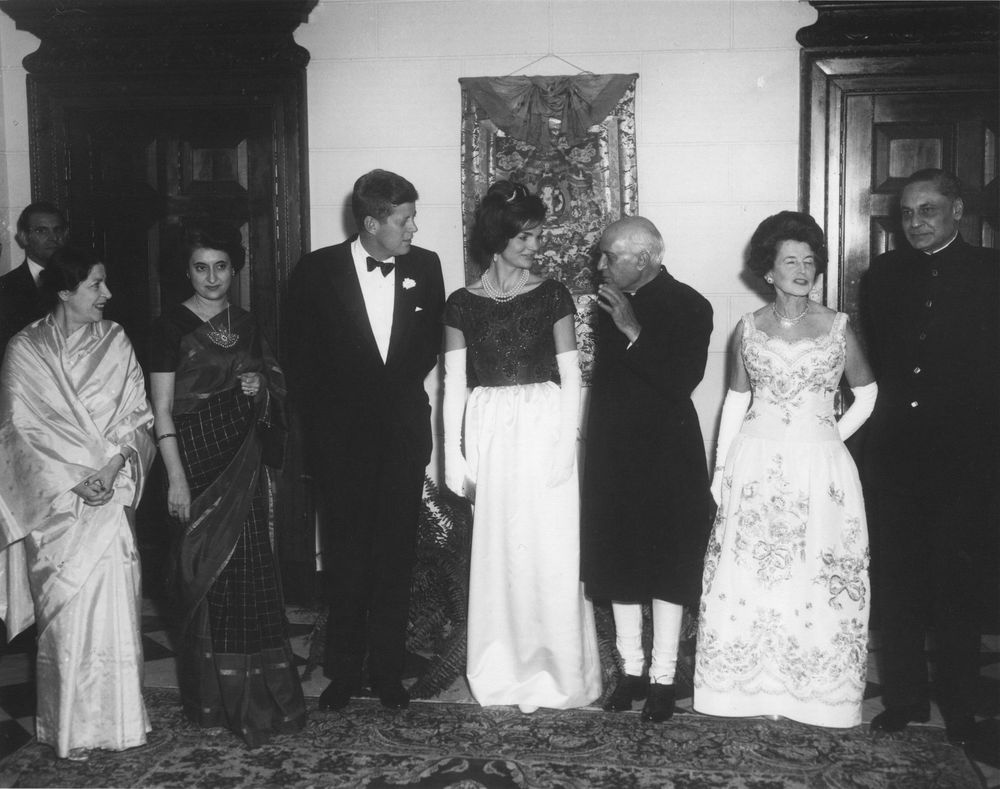
Dinner in Honor of President John F. Kennedy given by Prime Minister Jawaharlal Nehru. Fori Nehru (first left) (1961)

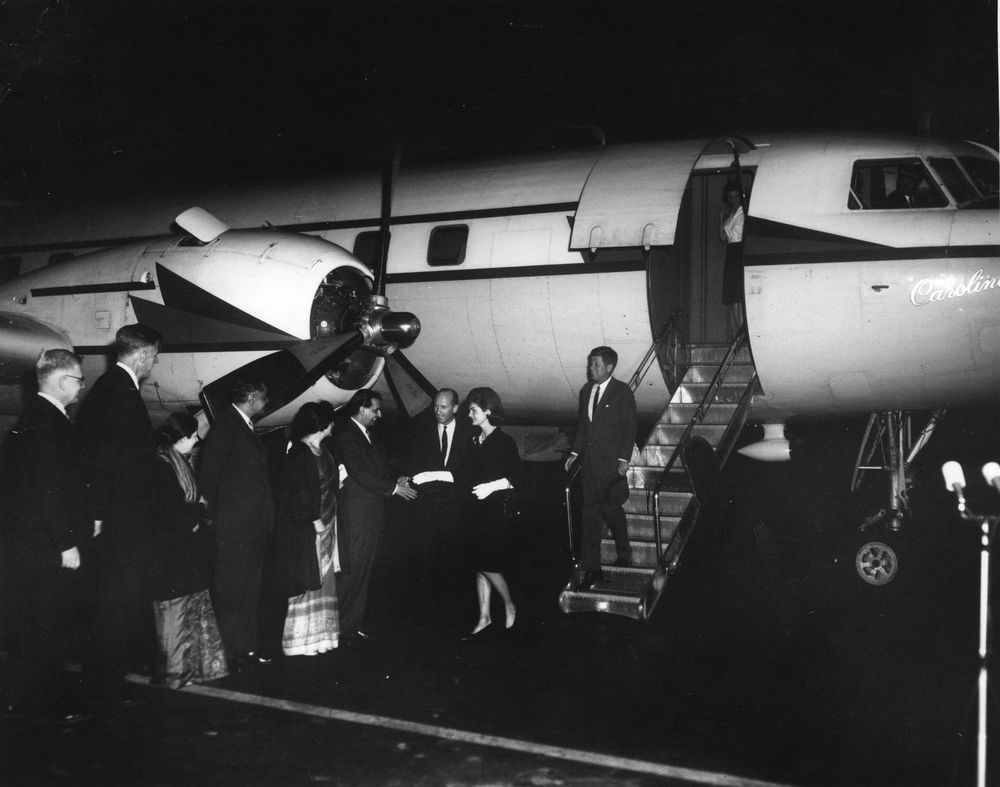
Nehru greeting Jaqueline Kennedy upon her return from goodwill tour of India (1962)

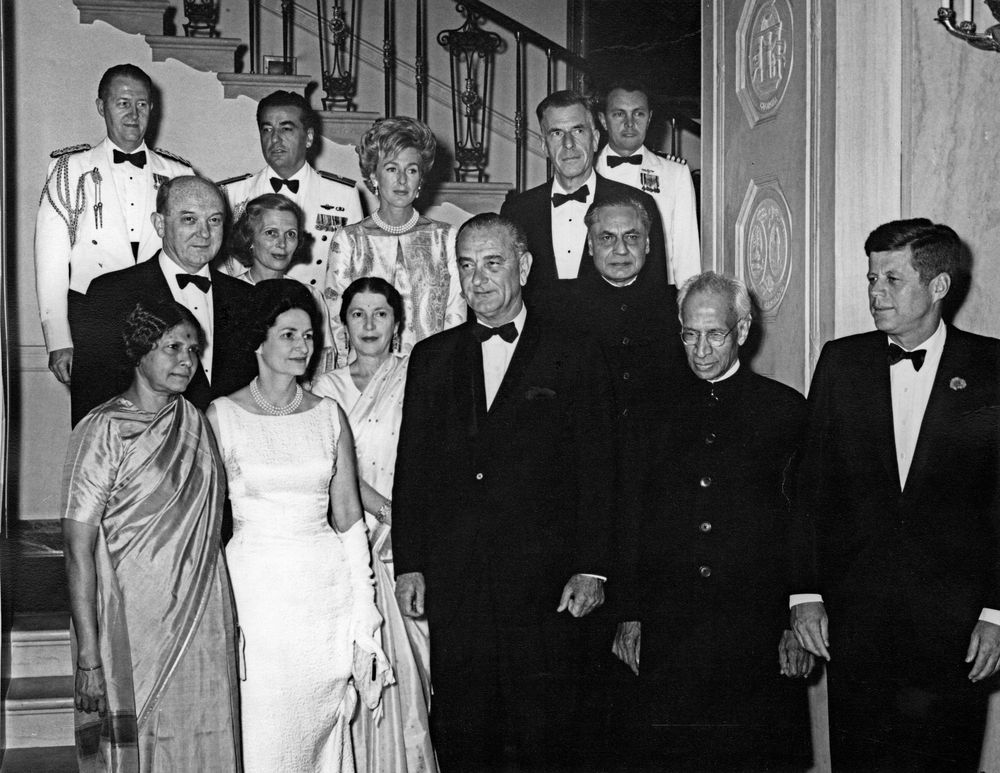
Guests of a State Dinner for President Dr. Sarvepalli Radhakrishnan. Fori Nehru (middle of second row) (1963)

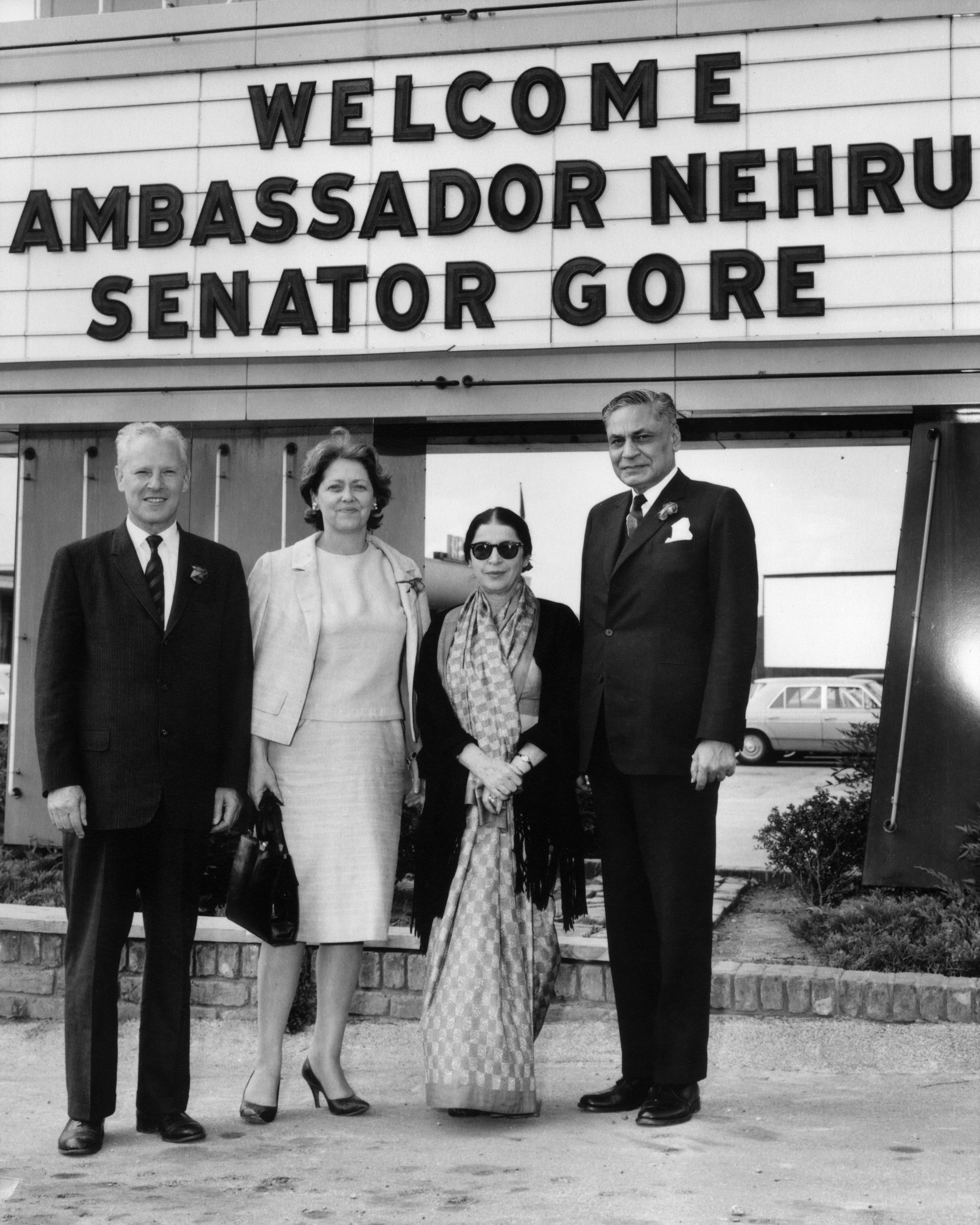
Visits from Ambassador Nehru of India and Senator Gore. Fori Nehru (third from left) (1963)

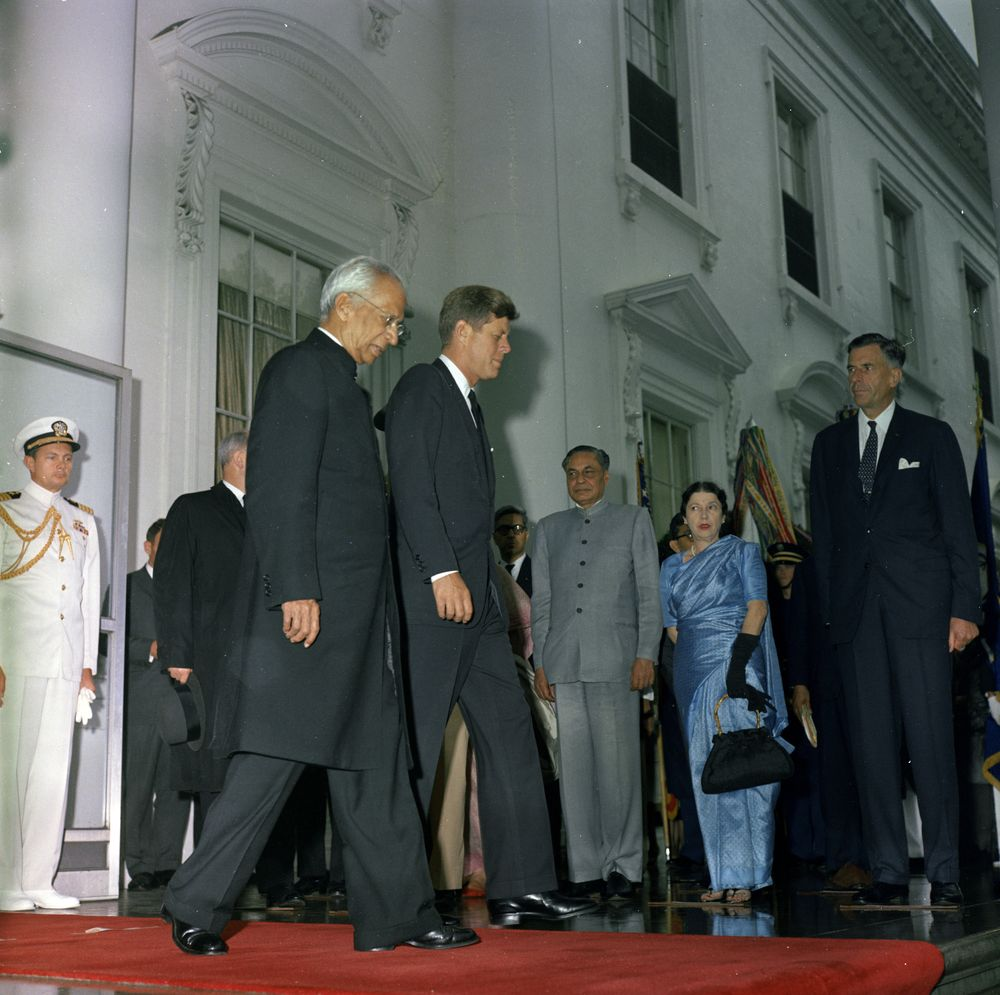
President John F. Kennedy and President Dr. Sarvepalli Radhakrishnan. Fori Nehru in blue saree (1963)

== Later life ==
Fori Nehru began practicing Hinduism after marriage; her son Ashok recalls her as "perhaps the only practicing Hindu" in the family. She did pilgrimage to Tirumala four times and had a puja shrine with images of Ganesha and Balaji at her home in Kasauli.

In 1976, Nehru was one of a very few close to India's Prime Minister Indira Gandhi that confronted her about the forces used during the Emergency. The story of how she presented Gandhi with a list of names of men who had been forcibly sterilised is told in Nehru's husband's memoirs.

In 1989, Nehru and her husband moved to Kasauli, where he died in 2002.

== Letters to Auntie Fori (2002) ==
In 1958 Nehru met Martin Gilbert, a friend of her son Ashok from university days and later historian and official biographer of Winston Churchill. When he arrived at the Nehru home that year he was unwell, and he later recounted that she successfully nursed him to recovery with rice and yoghurt. Gilbert visited her in Washington in the 1960s, and later in London when her husband was Indian High Commissioner there. They continued to correspond but did not see each other again until 1998. He referred to the Nehru's as Auntie Fori and Uncle Birju, and until 1998 had no idea she was from Budapest's Jewish community. She asked him to recommend a book about the history of Jews. In response, he wrote her one letter every week for 140 weeks, each addressed "Dear Auntie Fori", tracing the course of Jewish history over 5,000 years. The letters were collectively published in a book titled Letters to Auntie Fori: The 5,000-Year History of the Jewish People and Their Faith (2002).

== Death and legacy ==
Nehru died in Kasauli on 25 April 2017, at the age of 108. She is frequently mentioned as a friend in biographies of Indira Gandhi, and in her husband's autobiography, Nice Guys Finish Second, as "a wife who gives direction and stability". Gilbert's Letters to Auntie Fori (2002) are dedicated to her. Mahatma Gandhi's grandson, Gopalkrishna Gandhi, dedicates his book on 20 key figures throughout the Gandhi-Nehru years, Of a Certain Age: Twenty life sketches (2011) to Nehru; she likely knew many of them he explains. She was listed in John Kenneth Galbraith's dedications in his 1983 book The voice of the poor.

Some of Nehru's experiences and contributions to the lives of those displaced in the Delhi camps after partition are included in Development Retold: Voices from the field (1999). Her oral history (2013) of partition is held in the 1947 Partition Archives at Stanford Libraries.

== Bibliography ==
- Nehru, B. K (2012). Nice guys finish second: memoirs. New Delhi: Penguin Books. ISBN 978-0-14-341782-8. OCLC 1117765699.
