= Letters to Auntie Fori =

Collection of letters by Sir Martin Gilbert

- Author: Sir Martin Gilbert
- Language: English
- Genre: History
- Published: 2002
- Publisher: Orion Publishing Group
- Publication place: UK
- Pages: 460
- ISBN: 0-75381-693-8

Letters to Auntie Fori (2002) is a collection of letters collated in a book by Sir Martin Gilbert to Fori Nehru, explaining the history of Jewish people over the course of 5,000 years. It was published by Orion Publishing Group in 2002.

== Background ==
Fori Nehru met Martin Gilbert in 1958. He was a friend of her son Ashok, from university days, and later historian and official biographer of Winston Churchill. When Gilbert arrived at the Nehru home that year he was unwell, and he later recounted that she successfully nursed him to recovery with rice and yoghurt. They continued to keep in touch but did not see each other again until 40 years later in 1998. He referred to the Nehru's as Auntie Fori and uncle Birju, and until 1998 had no idea she was from Budapest's Jewish community. She asked him to recommend a book about the history of Jews. In response, he wrote her one letter every week for 140 weeks, each addressed "Dear Auntie Fori", tracing the course of Jewish history over 5,000 years. The letters were collectively published in the book titled Letters to Auntie Fori: The 5,000-Year History of the Jewish People and Their Faith.

== Layout ==
The book is divided into four parts, preceded by acknowledgments and an introduction, and followed by an epilogue, appendix, bibliography, maps, and an index.
