= Refugee Handicrafts =

- Merged into: Central Cottage Industries Emporium
- Formation: 1947
- Founders: Fori Nehru; Kitty Shiva Rao; Achamma Mathai; Prem Bery
- Founded at: Delhi, India
- Dissolved: 1952
- Type: NGO
- Purpose: Provide employment to refugees
- Products: Indian handicrafts

Refugee Handicrafts was an organisation established in 1947 by Fori Nehru, Kitty Shiva Rao, Achamma Mathai, and Prem Bery, in Delhi, to assist refugee women in providing an income. In 1952 it was incorporated into the Central Cottage Industries Emporium.

== Gallery ==
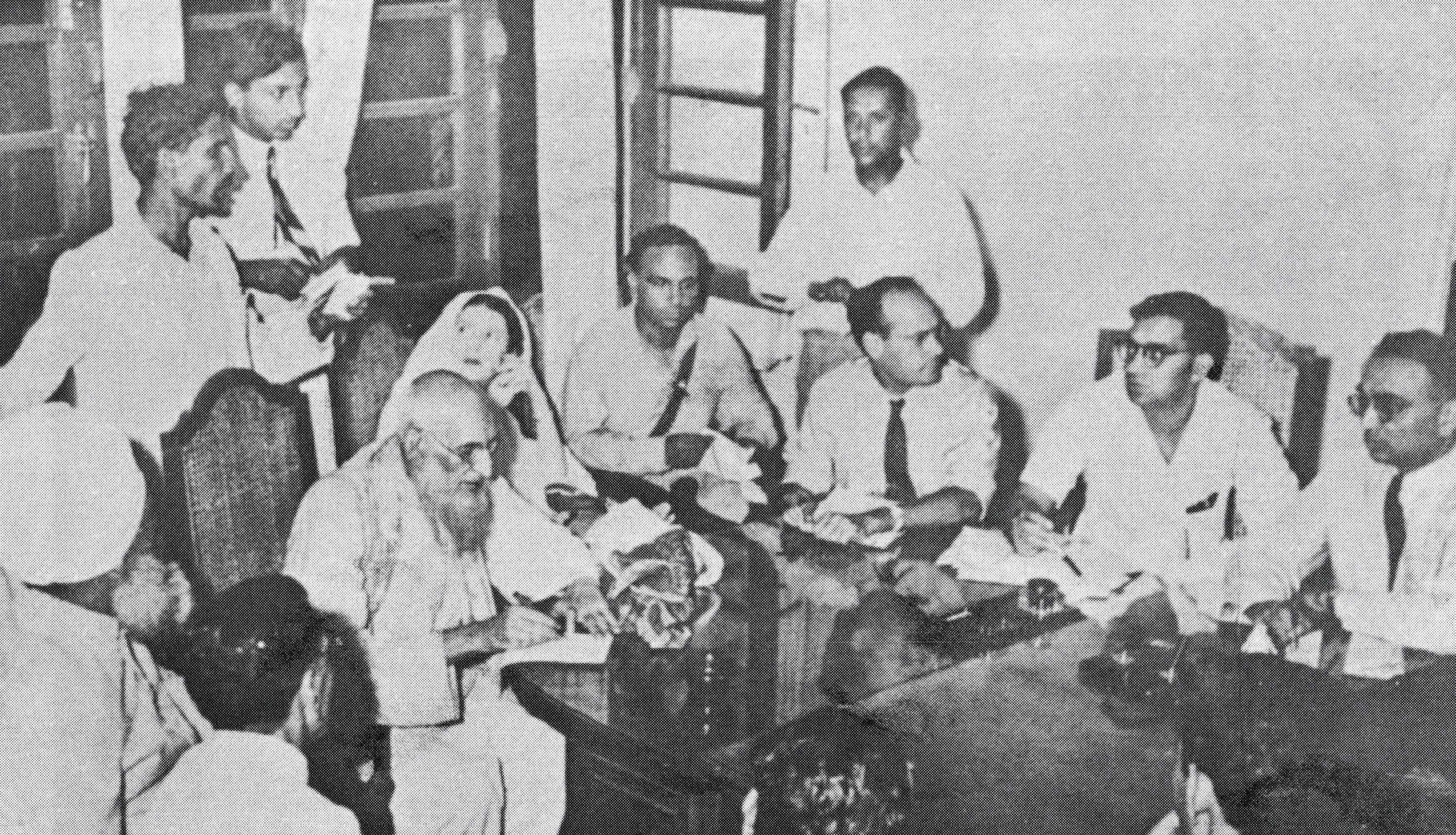
The Emergency Committee Control Room, Delhi, September 1947

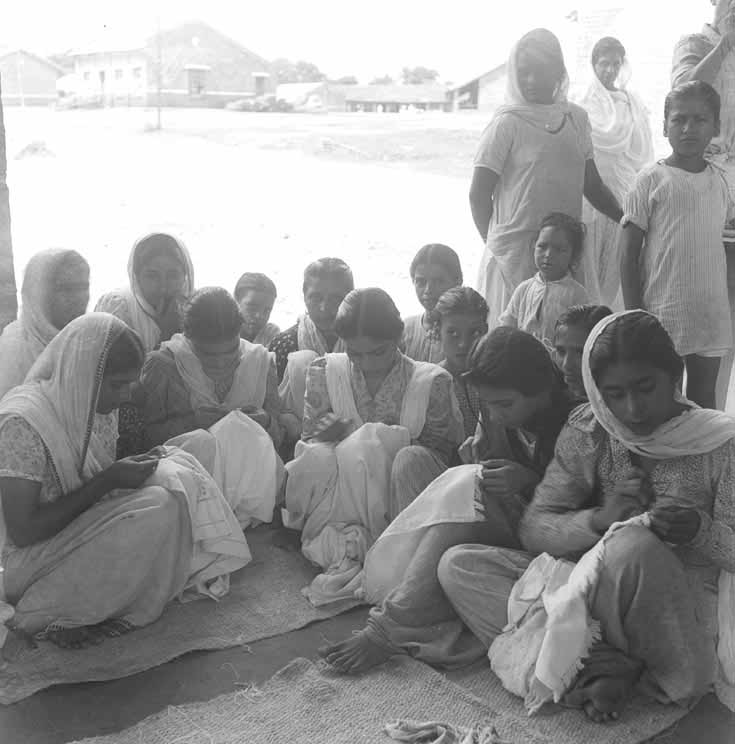
Women refugees at the Kingsway Camp, Delhi, sewing and knitting, September 1947
