= Delhi Emergency Committee =

The Delhi Emergency Committee was a unit of civil servants, police officials and emergency volunteers assembled by the Government of India in the immediate aftermath of the independence and partition of India in 1947, to oversee the work of restoring law and order, and organizing relief and rehabilitation work for refugees in the Delhi capital territory. Its chairman was Sardar Vallabhbhai Patel, India's home minister, and the work was directed by home secretary H. M. Patel.

Other members included Fori Nehru, the only female on the committee.

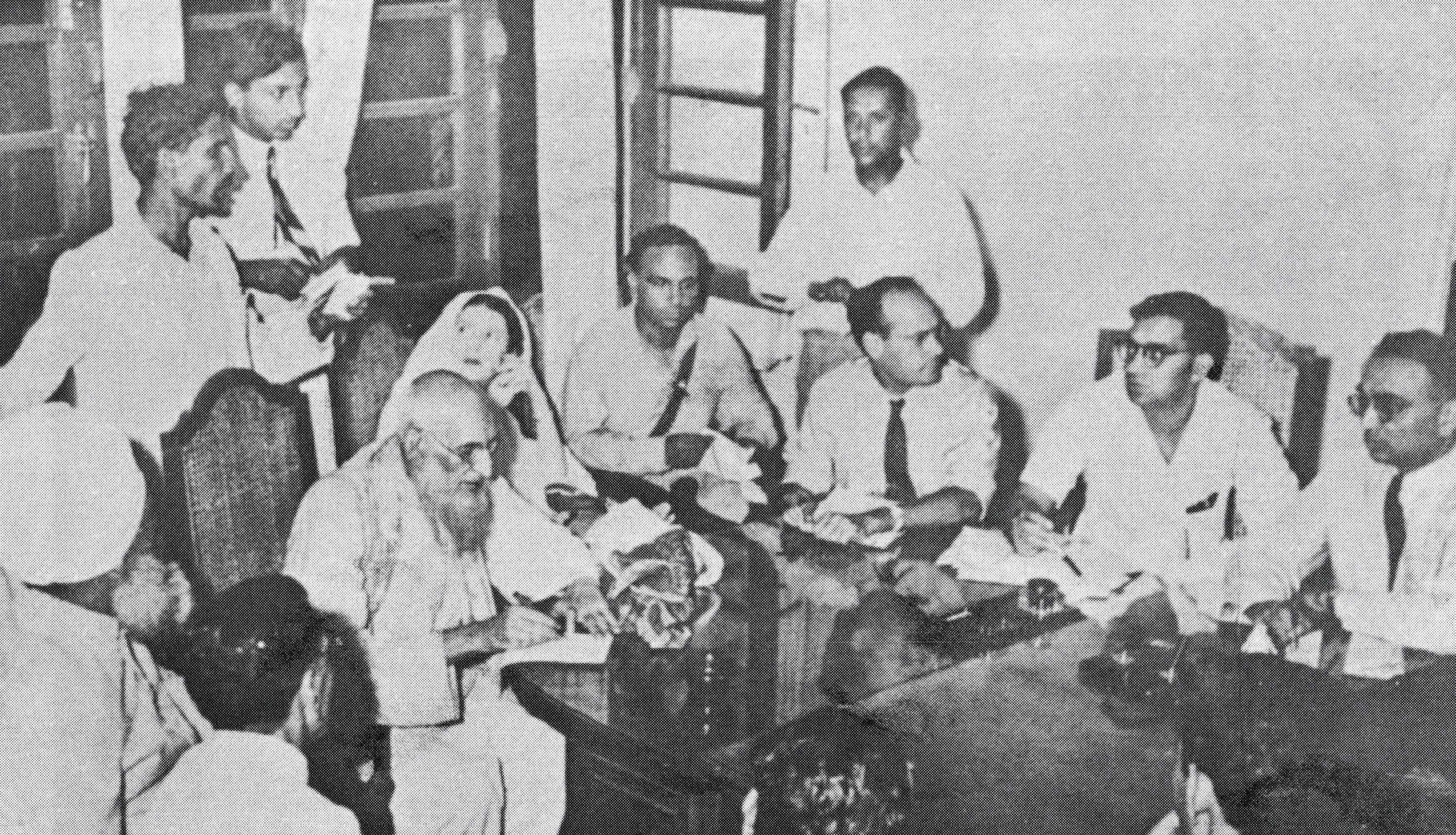
The Emergency Committee Control Room, Delhi, September 1947
