= Narendra Nath Bery =

Narendra Nath Bery was an Indian dentist, president of the Dental Council of India, dental advisor to the Government of India, and recipient of the Padma Bhushan and Elmer S. Best Memorial Award. He was married to Prem Bery.
