= All India Handicrafts Board =

- Abbreviation: AIHB
- Formation: 1952
- Founders: Ministry of Commerce and Industry, India; Kamaladevi Chattopadhyay; Pupul Jayakar
- Dissolved: 2020
- Location: New Delhi, India

The All India Handicrafts Board (AIHB), was an organisation in India established in 1952, which aimed to advise the Ministry of Textiles on development programmes for handicrafts. Its early key figures included Pupul Jayakar, Kamaladevi Chattopadhyay, Lakshmi Chand Jain and Fori Nehru. It was abolished by the Government of India in 2020 during the COVID-19 pandemic.

== Origins ==
In 1950 Pupul Jayakar was invited by Jawaharlal Nehru to study the handloom sector of the economy. The AIHB was established in 1952. Its first chair was Kamaladevi Chattopadhyay. Other early key figures included Lakshmi Chand Jain, Kitty Shiva Rao and Fori Nehru.

== Purpose ==
The AIHB aimed to advise the Ministry of Textiles on development programmes for handicrafts, and was an umbrella organisation, covering marketing venues across India, including Central Cottage Industries Emporium.

== Disestablishment ==
The AIHB was abolished by the Government of India in 2020, during the COVID-19 pandemic.
