= Braj Kumar Nehru =

Indian politician (1909–2001)

Braj Kumar Nehru MBE
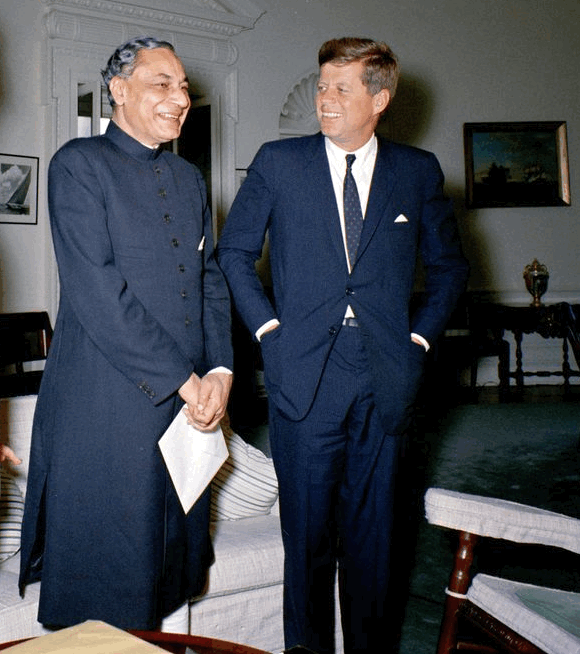
- Nehru with US President John F. Kennedy at the White House, 1961

Governor of Gujarat
- In office 26 April 1984 – 26 February 1986
- Chief Minister: Madhav Singh Solanki
- Preceded by: K.M. Chandy
- Succeeded by: R. K. Trivedi

Governor of Jammu and Kashmir
- In office 22 February 1981 – 26 April 1984
- Chief Minister: Sheikh Abdullah; Farooq Abdullah
- Preceded by: Lakshmi Kant Jha
- Succeeded by: Jagmohan

High Commissioner of India to the United Kingdom
- In office 1973 - 1977
- Preceded by: Apa Pant
- Succeeded by: Narayan Ganesh Gore

Governor of Manipur
- In office 21 January 1972 - 20 September 1973
- Chief Minister: Mohammed Alimuddin
- Preceded by: Office established
- Succeeded by: Lallan Prasad Singh

Governor of Meghalaya
- In office 1 April 1970 - 18 September 1973
- Chief Minister: Williamson A. Sangma
- Preceded by: Office established
- Succeeded by: Lallan Prasad Singh

Governor of Nagaland
- In office 17 April 1968 - 18 September 1973
- Chief Minister: Thepfülo-u Nakhro; Hokishe Sema
- Preceded by: Vishnu Sahay
- Succeeded by: Lallan Prasad Singh

10th Governor of Assam
- In office 17 April 1968 – 19 September 1973
- Chief Minister: Bimala Prasad Chaliha; Mahendra Mohan Choudhury; Sarat Chandra Sinha
- Preceded by: Vishnu Sahay
- Succeeded by: Lallan Prasad Singh

Indian Ambassador to the United States
- In office 1961 - 1968
- Preceded by: M. C. Chagla
- Succeeded by: Ali Yavar Jung

Personal details
- Born: 4 September 1909 Allahabad, United Provinces of Agra and Oudh, British India
- Died: 31 October 2001 (aged 92) Kasauli, Himachal Pradesh, India
- Spouse: Shobha ("Fori") Nehru (née Magdolna Friedman) (m. 1935)
- Children: Ashok Nehru, Aditya Nehru, and Anil Nehru
- Education: Allahabad University; Oxford University; London School of Economics

Braj Kumar Nehru MBE, ICS (4 September 1909 – 31 October 2001) was an Indian diplomat and Ambassador of India to the United States (1961–1968).

He was the son of Brijlal Nehru and Rameshwari Nehru and the first cousin of India's first prime minister Jawaharlal Nehru.

== Personal life ==
Braj Kumar was born to Brijlal Nehru and Rameshwari Nehru in Allahabad, then United Provinces of Agra and Oudh on 4 September 1909. He was educated at the Allahabad University (India), the London School of Economics and at Oxford University. He was awarded the Doctor of Literature degree by the University of Punjab, for his distinguished services in various fields. His grandfather, Pandit Nandlal Nehru, was the elder brother of Pandit Motilal Nehru. He was the cousin to the erstwhile Prime Minister of India, Indira Gandhi (née Nehru). In 1935, Nehru married Magdolna Friedman (5 December 1908, Budapest, Austria-Hungary - 25 April 2017, Kasauli, Himachal Pradesh, India), a fellow student in the UK who was of a Hungarian Jewish background. The ill-treatment of the Jewish community in Europe prompted her father to change her name to Magdolna Forbath. Her nickname was Fori. After marriage, she changed her name to Shobha Nehru.

== Career ==
=== National ===
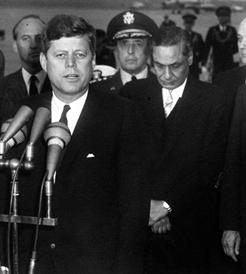
Ambassador Braj Nehru stands behind US president John F. Kennedy during Kennedy's speech welcoming Prime Minister Jawaharlal Nehru to the United States (1961)

He joined the Indian Civil Service in 1934 and rose to be governor of seven different states of India. From 1934 to 1937 he held various government positions in the province of Punjab. Nehru became the secretary of economic affairs in 1957. He was appointed Commissioner General for Economic Affairs (external financial relations) of India in 1958. He was Governor of Jammu and Kashmir (1981–84), Assam (1968–73), Gujarat (1984–86), Nagaland (1968–73), Meghalaya (1970–73), Manipur (1972–73) and Tripura (1972–73). He was transferred overnight as the Governor of Jammu & Kashmir to Gujarat after he refused to help Indira Gandhi in destabilising the Farooq Abdullah government.

=== International ===
Nehru worked as executive director in the World Bank (1949) and was Economic Minister at the Indian Embassy in Washington (1954). He helped to create the Aid India Club in 1958, which was a consortium of donor nations that committed to donate $2 million for the development of India. He also served as a diplomat, as ambassador to several countries and was offered the post of secretary-general of the United Nations in 1951, but declined. Nehru was also the Indian High Commissioner in London from 1973 to 1977. Braj was chairman of the United Nations Investment committee for 14 years. He represented India in the 'Sterlings balances' negotiations with Britain at the post-Second World War reparations conference.

=== Writer ===
Nehru wrote an autobiography titled Nice Guys Finish Second. Ramesh Kumar Saxena, who worked for him for 35 years, helped writing his biography.

== Awards ==
He was appointed an MBE in the 1945 New Year Honours. He was awarded the Padma Vibhushan in 1999.

== Death ==
Nehru died in Kasauli, Himachal Pradesh, India on 31 October 2001 at the age of 92. His body was cremated in Delhi and a memorial service was held amongst the chanting of mantras from the holy scriptures.

Political offices
Preceded by M.C. Chagla	Indian Ambassador to the United States; 1961–1968	Succeeded by Ali Yavar Jung
