= Kitty Shiva Rao =

Austrian Montessori teacher and theosophist

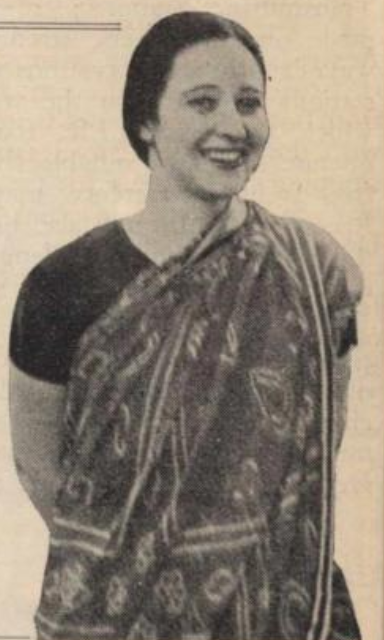
- Kitty Shiva Rao, from a 1937 publication
- Born: Kitty Verständig; 12 December 1903; Vienna, Austria
- Died: 9 February 1980 (aged 76); Bangalore, India
- Occupation: Montessori teacher
- Known for: Association with the Indian education system and Indian women's movement; Promoting handicrafts made in India
- Spouse: Benegal Shiva Rao (1929-1975)

Kitty Shiva Rao (12 December 1903 – 9 February 1980) was a Montessori teacher and theosophist from Austria who, by India's independence, had led a committee of women to draft an Indian Women's Charter of Rights and Duties for the new constitution of India. She studied child education and served on several women's movement and education boards including the All India Women's Conference (AIWC), All India Handicrafts Board, Indian Council for Child Welfare and Delhi University Board.

Born into an upper middle-class Jewish family, Shiva Rao spent her early career at the Vienna House of Children. In 1925, she attended the Theosophical Society at Adyar, India, and decided to stay and head a Montessori school in Varanasi, before then establishing a Montessori in Allahabad. In 1929, she married the journalist and Congress politician Benegal Shiva Rao.

In 1947, with Fori Nehru, she helped set up the Refugee Handicrafts employment campaign in Delhi for refugee women in the camps following the partition of India. Later, she co-founded a national programme for the development of handicrafts and handloom products, and continued to promote Indian made crafts later in her career.

== Early life ==
Kitty Verständig was born in 1903 to Abraham Verständig and Jenny Lowy, an upper middle-class Jewish family. She studied Montessori education. In her early career she taught at the Vienna House of Children, a Montessori school, and attended the Theosophical Society.

== Career ==
=== 1920s-30s ===
In 1925, after attending the 50th anniversary of the Theosophical Society at Adyar, Chennai, she decided not to return to Austria, and stayed on to become associated with the Indian education system, beginning with head of a Montessori school in Varanasi. In 1927 she required assistance in establishing a Montessori school in Allahabad and invited her friend, Elise Braun Barnettto. There, both women mingled among the elite Nehru family. Herbatschek stayed for two-years and taught Jawaharlal Nehru's daughter Indira, and was assisted by his sister Krishna. Verständig married the journalist and Congress politician Benegal Shiva Rao in 1929 and became Kitty Shiva Rao. Her friends included Jiddu Krishnamurti, who had been taught by her husband and theosophists. In 1931, like other new educationists, she travelled to Germany and visited schools such as the Odenwaldschule of Paul Geheeb, to update on developments in education. After Anschluss, she helped Herbatschek, who had by then married Rudolf Braun, escape to India. Her connections allowed her to assist other Jews fleeing persecution to settle in India.

=== 1940s-50s ===
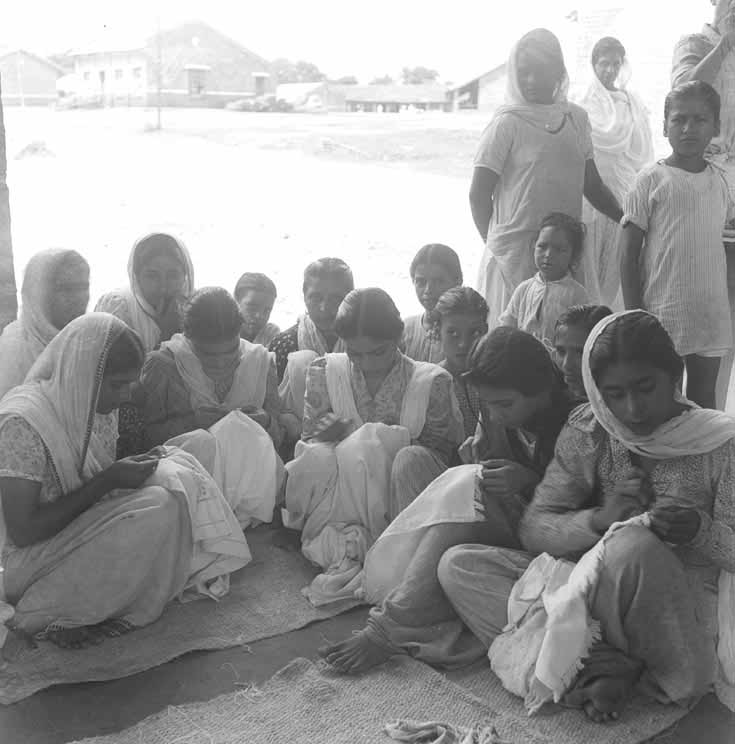
Women at the Kingsway Camp, Delhi, sewing and knitting, September 1947

Shiva Rao studied child education in depth and served on several education boards and committees, including the Delhi University Board and the All-India Education Fund Association. She was highly critical of authoritarian types of teaching and believed that the needs of children should be identified and met, along with better laws for women.

Shiva Rao became involved in the Indian women's movement, and joined the All India Women's Conference (AIWC), taking the lead for the Social and Legislation Section at the conferences in 1941 and 1945, and endorsed their view "that the position of women in any state or society was an indication of the degree of its civilisation." With Shiva Rao as lead, the AIWC was able to have access to the Rau committee, chaired by her brother-in-law and appointed in 1941 by the government to examine issues in Hindu law pertaining to women's inheritance. By 1946, she had become an important member of the AIWC, which made decisions that could be ratified by then new Constituent Assembly and which revealed contradictions in the proposed Hindu code bills. In creating the Hindu code bills, after agreeing that men and women should have equal rights, the AIWC questioned why a debate was needed on whether a daughter could inherit equally with her brother. Shiva Rao was appointed head of a committee to work out what Indian women expected from the new constitution of India. By India's independence, she had led women to draft an Indian Women's Charter of Rights and Duties for the new constitution. Other members included Lakshmi N. Menon, Kamaladevi Chattopadhyay, Renuka Ray and Hannah Sen.

Along with Fori Nehru and Prem Bery, she helped set up an employment campaign, 'Refugee Handicrafts', for refugee women in the 1947 Delhi camps following partition. After 1947 she pioneered the Indian Council for Child Welfare. In July 1948, Shiva Rao reported that the AIWC was urging a swift passing of the Hindu code bills by lobbying ministers and the prime minister. It was generally understood by the AIWC that public campaigns were not enough to make change for women's rights; women were reported to object to the Hindu code bill in public, but secretly revealed that was really the view of their households. In 1949, she said to members of the AIWC "that unless you make an effort and urge on the member of the legislature representing your town or province the urgency of taking up this measure and asking him for his support, it will be difficult to get the Code through ... I am requesting you to write without delay to the member presenting you and urge on him that he should support this measure".

In 1952, she co-founded a national programme for the development of handicrafts and handloom products. She also became vice president of the All India Handicrafts Board. The Indian artist Anjolie Ela Menon recalled that post independence, Shiva Rao was one of a small group of women "who took it upon themselves to preserve and develop handicrafts and the handloom industry, without any renumeration".

Later in her life, she spent time in the US when her husband was posted to work with the United Nations. There she continued promoting Indian made crafts along with Fori Nehru.

== Death ==
She died on 9 February 1980, in Bangalore, India.

== Publications ==
- Rao, Kitty Shiva (1945). The Draft Hindu Code. All-India Women's Conference.
