= Achamma Mathai =

Indian social worker and women's rights activist

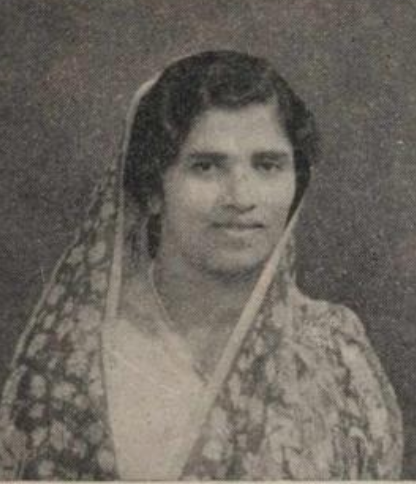
- Achamma Mathai, from a 1936 issue of The Indian Listener
- Born: Kerala, India
- Occupation: Social worker
- Spouse: John Mathai
- Awards: Padma Shri

Achamma Mathai was an Indian social worker, women's rights activist, a co-founder of Dr. John Mathai Centre, an institute of Information Technology, Economics, Management, Theatre Arts and Music under the University of Calicut and the wife of John Mathai, the first Railway Minister of India and a former Finance minister. During her stay in Delhi, when her husband was serving in the Union Ministry, she was reported to have been involved in activities related to children's education. During the riots that followed Indian independence, she worked alongside Sucheta Kripalani for the rehabilitation of the riot victims. She served as a member of the Advisory Committee for Libraries in 1955 and as the chairperson of the Central Social Welfare Board in the early Sixties. The Government of India honoured her in 1954, with the award of Padma Shri, the fourth highest Indian civilian award for her contributions to society, placing her among the first recipients of the award.
