= Barakhamba =

Tughlaq period tomb in India

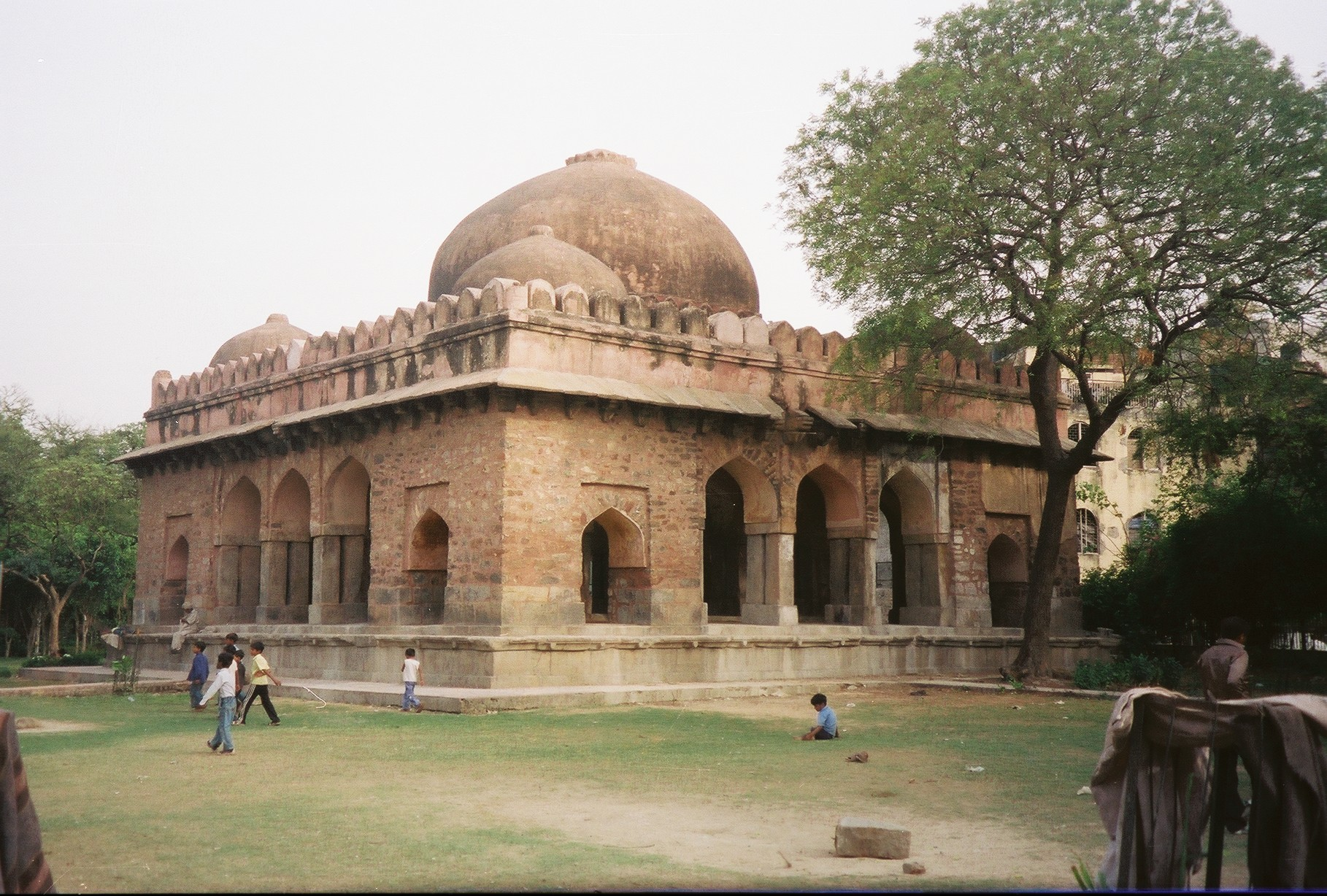
- Barakhamba Monument

- Location of Barakhamba in Delhi

Religion
- Affiliation: Islam
- Leadership: Muhammad bin Tughluq
- Year consecrated: 14th century

Location
- Location: New Delhi, India
- Interactive map of Barakhamba
- Coordinates: 28°35′28.7″N 77°14′30.5″E

Architecture
- Type: Tomb
- Style: Islamic

Specifications
- Direction of façade: Open on four sides
- Dome: Four Domes

Barakhamba, also known as Barakhamba Monument, is a 14th-century tomb building from the Tughlaq period that is located in New Delhi, India. Barakhamba means '12 Pillars' in Urdu and Hindi languages. The name has also been used for an upscale modern metro road named the "Barakhamba road" in Connaught Place at the heart of the city.

Barakhamba monument is a tomb constructed by Muhammad bin Tughluq. It is located in the Nizamuddin heritage area at the entrance road to the Nizamuddin Auliya and is under restoration.

== Monument structure ==
The tomb has twelve pillars and has three arched openings on each face. The verandah (passage), laid around the central chamber, has four domed apartments at each corner. The structure is located in an open park and is easily visible and accessible to public. It lies on the opposite side of 7th Hole of the Delhi Golf Club course and on the main road from Subz Burz circle or Nizamuddin circle to the World Heritage Monument – the Humayun tomb.

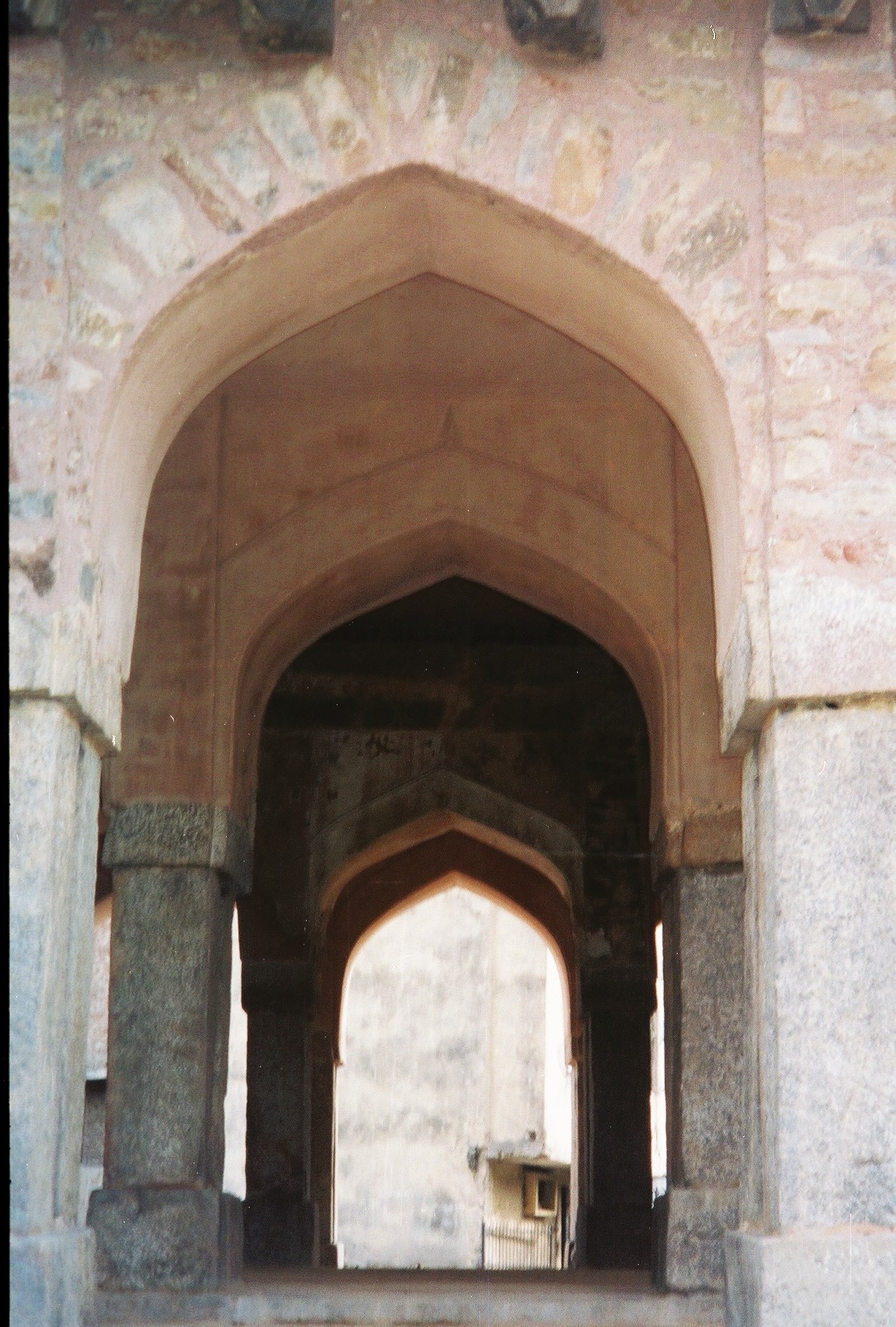
Pillared View of Barakhamba Monument

== Restoration ==
The monument was neglected and subject to occupation by squatters until recently. It was also defaced by spit of paan (betel leaf) and graffiti on the walls by vandals. The squatters have been removed and the area has been made more secure. Efforts are being made to restore the monument to its original glory. There are also plans for the park and the garden around the tomb to be redone. As a first step, the Archaeological Survey of India (ASI) has started removing the stains and scars on the defaced faces of the monument using chemical treatment using an application of a special paste called multani mitti pack on the monument several times to erase marks and to restore the original appearance. The next stage of restoration involves structural conservation work on the monument.

Barakhamba is one of the 46 monuments under restoration in Delhi. The restoration work was expected to be completed before the Commonwealth Games, which were held in New Delhi in 2010.

== Features ==
It has been inferred that the twelve pillared square monument may have been a tomb chamber with arcades around it, originally intended as Chausath Khamba. The Lalmahal, now in ruins and partially demolished, is a red sandstone monument behind Barakhamba.

Lalmahal

This heritage monument also called Kushak Lal was built by Balban the Slave Dynasty ruler, between 1266–1286 during the rule of Nasiruddin Mahmud Shah, Sultan of Delhi. This red sandstone structure had prominent chhatris which have been demolished.

== Sabz Burj ==
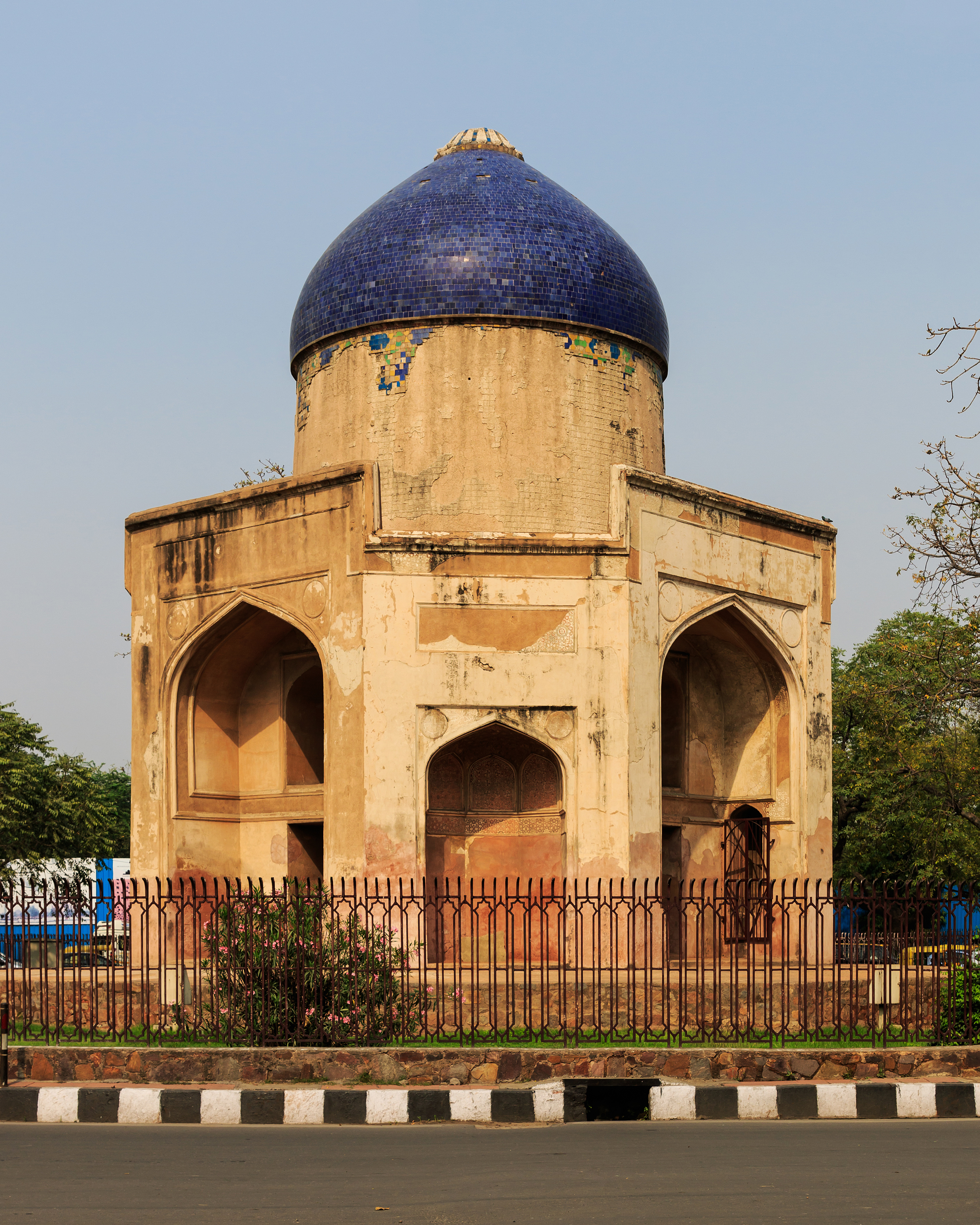
Subz Burg at Nizamuddin Circle

This impressive tomb made of blue tiles (though Subz means green) and stone is located at a circle opposite to the entrance gate to the Barakhamba, on the eastern enclosure wall of the Nizamuddin complex.

== Heritage status ==
Delhi’s heritage has 2,000 years of history and includes more than 1,000 tombs, forts, havelis, baolis, and darwazas. The city received the title of a 'World heritage city'. To achieve that status, Indian National Trust for Art and Cultural Heritage (INTACH), a nationwide non–profit organization founded (by former prime minister Rajiv Gandhi) in 1984 to protect the common national heritage, Delhi Chapter, signed a MoU with the Delhi government with the objective of ensuring urban development in congruence with the architectural monuments of the city. In this context, William Dalrymple, an Indophile, states that "only Rome, Istanbul and Cairo can even begin to rival Delhi for the sheer volume and density of historic remains". To achieve this goal, 46 historical monuments have been selected by the ASI for renovation work and the Barakhamba monument is one of them, and INTACH Delhi Chapter has categorised it under Grade "A" in terms of heritage value. The restoration works of this heritage structure in the strategic Nizamuddin heritage complex is slated for completion before the commencement of the Commonwealth Games in 2010.

== Details ==
In the context of the Barakhamba, the number 12 (twelve) in the monument, an observation recorded is that the Moghuls were fond of motifs of mystical figures on their buildings as evidenced in Delhi, Agra, Lahore and elsewhere. Figure seven (7) and figure 12, in particular, seem to have mystical significance to real time events such as 12 hours in the day and 12 in the night, 12 months, 12 apostles, 12 signs of the zodiac, 12 tribes, 12 branched candlesticks and 12 kinds of men and women and so forth. Similarly, the twelve–pillared buildings are stated to be a common feature during the ancient and medieval periods. As an example, it is mentioned that the Mausoleum of Mausolus, (since then the word Mausol has become an eponym in the word Mausoleum for all stately tombs), regarded as one of the Seven Wonders of the Ancient World in Turkey had 36 (thirty–six) slim columns (pillars), which is three times 12. In North India many cities have Barakhambas, like the one in Delhi. The Hazrat Nasiruddin tomb in Delhi is also said to be a 12 pillared square chamber.

== Barakhamba Road ==
Barakhamba Road is one of the premier roads of Delhi that connects Mandi House circle, near Sahitya Akademi and Doordarshan Kendra (Television Centre), with Connaught Place, New Delhi also called Rajiv Chowk. On both sides of the road many commercial complexes and several other landmarks are located. Some of the notable landmark buildings are the National Museum of Natural History, New Delhi, Embassy of Nepal, Embassy of the Islamic Republic of Iran, Vijaya Building, New Delhi House, Gopal towers, Sapru House, the prestigious Modern School (New Delhi) and many more. The Delhi Metro Rail Corporation (DMRC) has operationalized the Delhi Metro link, the rapid transit system called the Blue Line of 32.1 km (19.9 mi) length from Indraprastha via Barakhamba Road to Dwarka Sub City, Asia's largest residential colony in South West Delhi District. A ‘Control Centre’ of the Metro is located at the Metro Bhavan on Barakhamba Road.

The name tag Barakhamba of this famous road is credited to a twelve pillared (Bara Khamba) house of a noble man, stated to have been built during the rule of Sultan Mohammad Tuglaq, originally erected on this road, now demolished (with hardly any traces). An artist’s reconstruction of the house (see external link) shows it as a three storied house with a high tower and terrace with a chabootara (a sit out) to get a scenic view of the city. A high wall surrounds the open courtyard of the house.

== Vanishing old bungalows ==
Recently, the "48 °C (118.4 °F) festival" was organized by a biologist on the Barakhamba Road to highlight the heritage loss due to the fast vanishing bungalows of old architectural style (with a stately air) located on the road that were replaced by large modern office complexes.

== Gallery ==
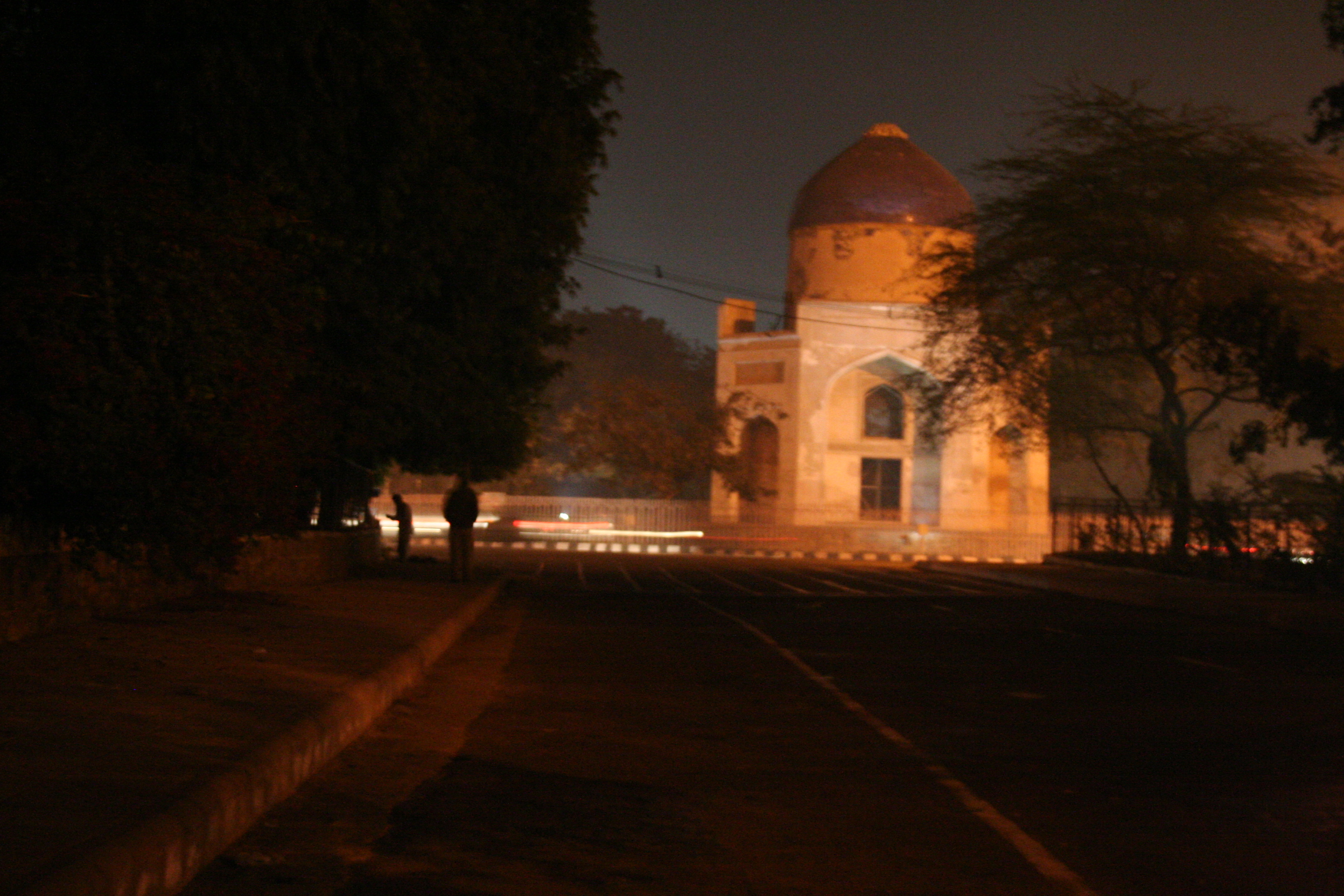
Night view of the Nizamuddin Circle and Sabz Burj

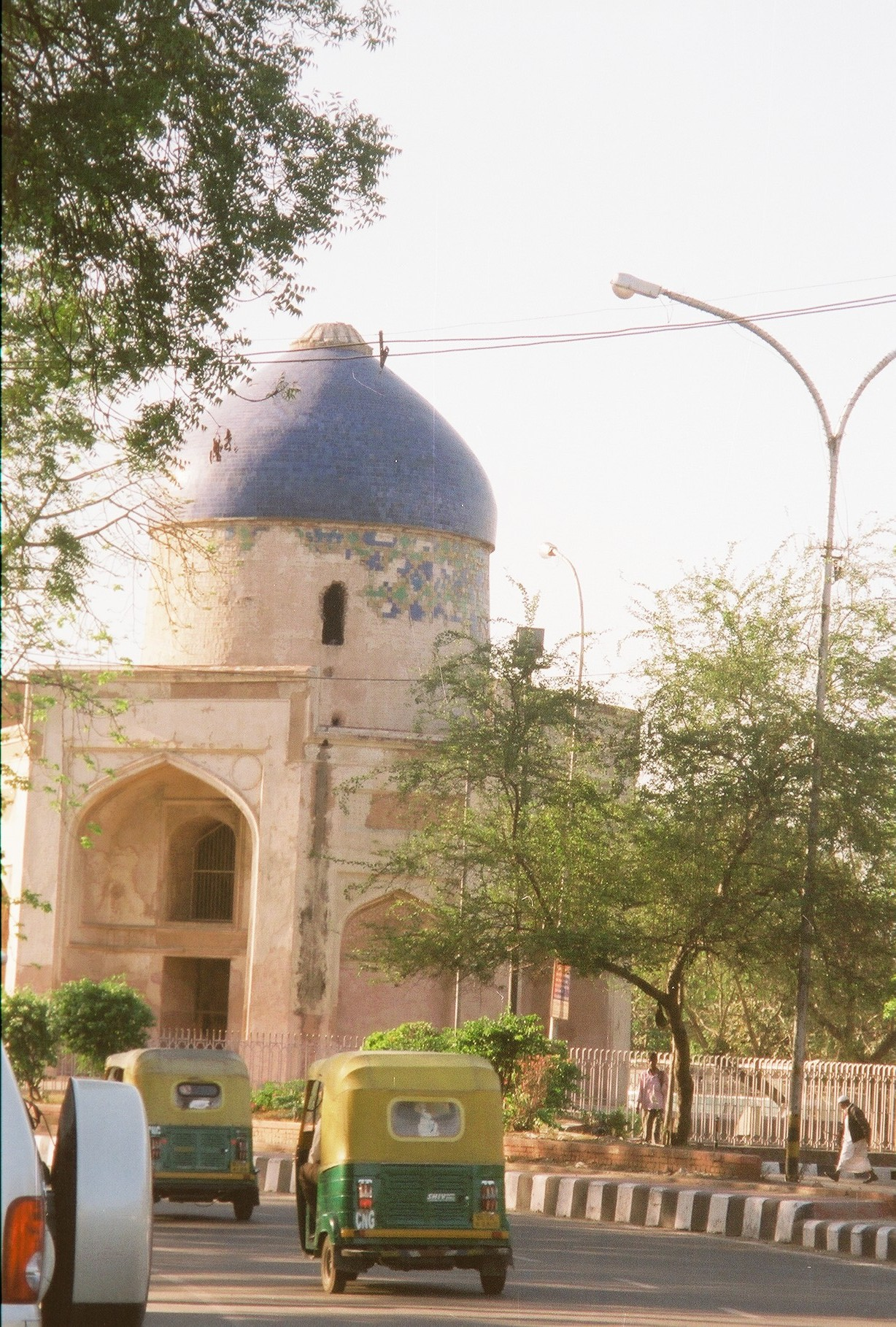
Sabz Burj at the Nizamuddin Circle

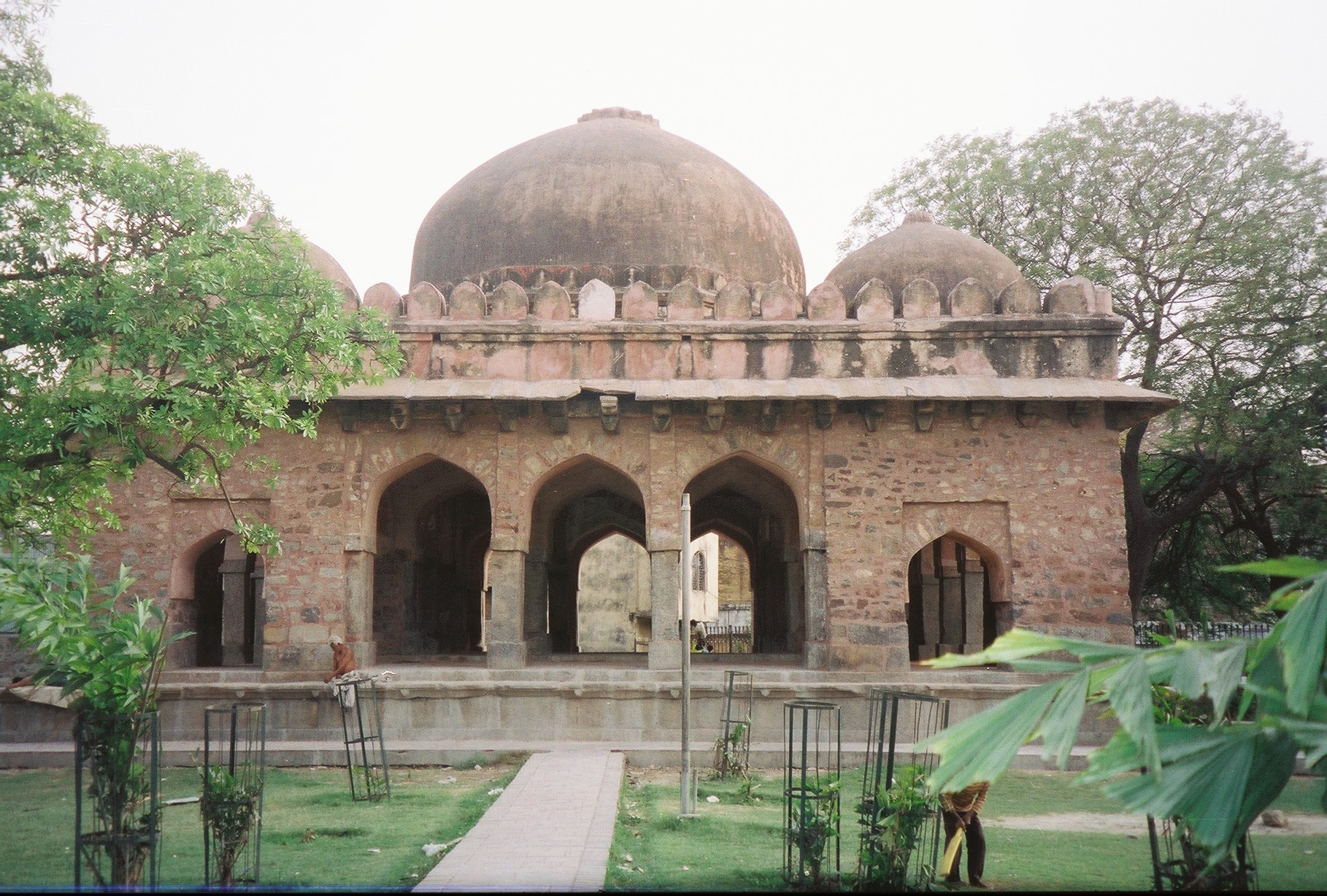
Front view of the Barakhamba Monument

== See also ==
- Jahanpanah was the fourth medieval city of Delhi established in 1326–1327 by Muhammad bin Tughlaq (1325–51), of the Delhi Sultanate.
- Khairul Manazil or Khair-ul-Manazil (lit. 'the most auspicious of houses') is a historical masjid built in 1561 in New Delhi, India.
