= Sari-inspired dress =

Dress using motifs of the traditional sari

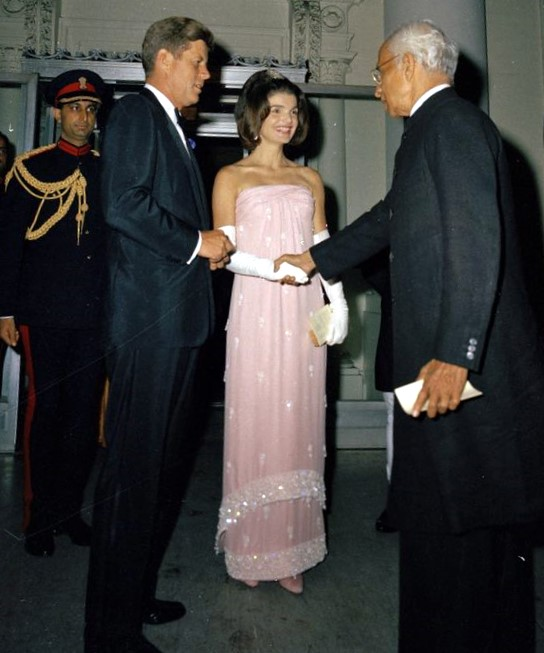
- Jacqueline Kennedy in a sari-inspired dress (3 June 1963)

A sari-inspired dress incorporates features of the traditional Indian sari, including the way it is draped, its decorations, and its colours.

In 1917, a sari-inspired dress appeared in the silent movie The Gown of Destiny. Following Jacqueline Kennedy's goodwill tour of India and Pakistan in 1962, when she had brought back several saris with the intention to make them into dresses, for a short while the sari-inspired dress gained enough interest to inspire several designers including Wesley Tann and Oleg Cassini to design dresses based on the sari. Other designers that have produced variations of the design include Dolce and Gabbana, Catherine Walker, Valentino, Marc Jacobs, Louis Vuitton and Alexander McQueen.

Kennedy wore Cassini's light-pink chiffon, sari-inspired dress to the opening of the Mona Lisa exhibition in Washington in 1963, and later that year wore it again when hosting a state dinner for Indian President Sarvepalli Radhakrishnan. When Princess Diana met the King of Thailand in 1988, she wore Walker's fuchsia and violet sari-inspired silk chiffon dress. In 1996 Elle supported their opinion of the sari-inspired dress by publishing an image of a woman looking down and stroking her embroidered black chiffon sari-inspired gown. In later years, other celebrities seen in sari-inspired dresses have included Jennifer Lopez, Freida Pinto, Sonam Kapoor, Jessica Chastain, and Archie Panjabi in a sari-gown embedded with colour changing LEDs.

== Description ==
A sari-inspired dress incorporates attributes of the Indian sari into its design. This includes how it drapes, its embellishment and colours. Fashion designers that have produced variations of the design include Wesley Tann, Marc Jacobs, Alexander McQueen, Dolce and Gabbana, Valentino, Armani, Marchesa, Elsa Schiaparelli, Germana Marucelli, Madame Grès, Marcel Rochas, Gianni Versace, Jean Paul Gaultier and Carolina Herrera.

== Early-20th century ==
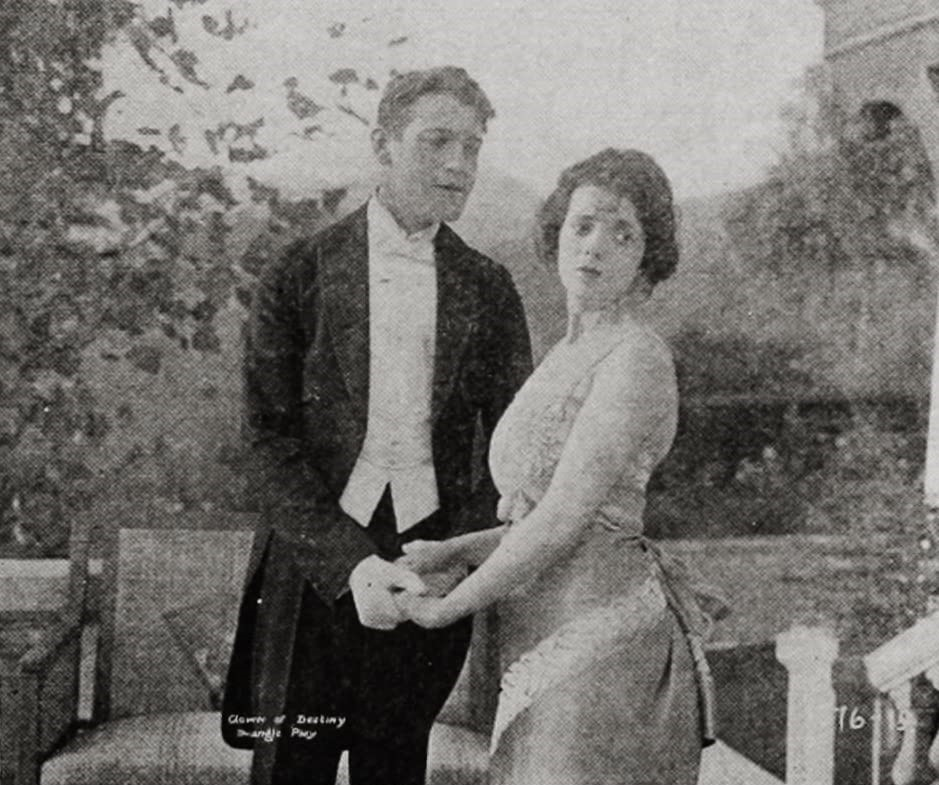
A Hickson Inc. designed sari-inspired dress for The Gown of Destiny (1917)

A sari-inspired dress appeared in the silent movie The Gown of Destiny (1917). In the film, the fictional character Mr Reyton leaves his mistress after noticing how beautiful his wife looks wearing the sari-inspired dress. The late 1930s sari-inspired designs of Schiaparelli, inspired by Princess Karam, would later inspire the gilt leather decorated black crêpe dress by Christian Bérard and Nada Patcevitch.

== Mid-20th century ==
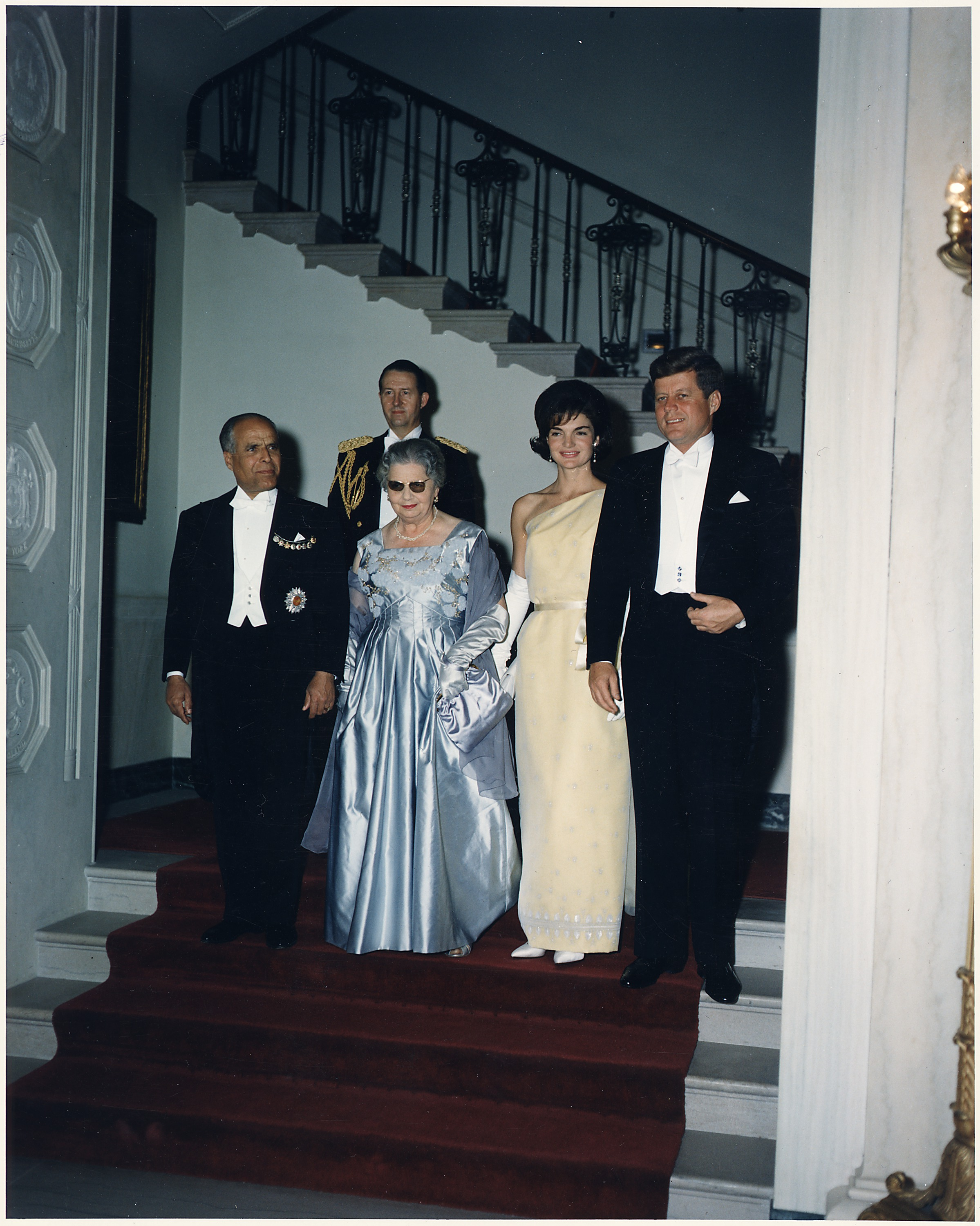
White House Dinner in honor of President of Tunisia. Kennedy in sari-inspired dress

Following Jacqueline Kennedy's goodwill tour of India and Pakistan in 1962, when she had brought back several saris with the intention to make them into dresses, for a short while the sari-inspired dress gained enough interest to inspire several designers including Wesley Tann to design dresses based from the sari. Tann produced several dresses using saris including two which featured in The New York Times and became available at Henri Bendel; a turquoise and gold silk Chanel-style suit and a two-piece red and gold dress. Joseph Horne Co. stocked several of Tann's sari-inspired dress. In 1963, Oleg Cassini made Kennedy a light-pink, sari-inspired dress to wear at the opening of the Mona Lisa exhibition in Washington 8 January 1963. It was based on a Howell Conant photograph of the yellow chiffon sari-inspired dress worn by Audrey Hepburn the previous year and was made using pink chiffon and decorated with porcelain beads and diamante. On 3 June 1963, she wore it again when hosting a state dinner for Indian President Sarvepalli Radhakrishnan. In 1967 Kennedy wore a sari-inspired Valentino gown to a dinner at the Chamcar Mon Palace in Phnom Penh, Cambodia.

== Late-20th century ==
When Princess Diana met the King of Thailand on 4 February 1988, she wore a fuchsia and violet sari-inspired silk chiffon dress, designed by Catherine Walker. According to Versace, Elizabeth Hurley's famous Versace black dress, which she wore in 1994, developed from the sari. The magazine Elle gave the sari coverage in 1996 when it featured outfits "with an Eastern influence". Elle called them "utterly delectable", "so exquisite" and "they come off best without any extra adornment". They supported their opinion by publishing an image of a woman looking down and stroking her embroidered black chiffon sari-inspired full-length dress with a gold lace border.

== 21st century ==
In 2003 Jennifer Lopez wore a mint green Valentino dress to the Oscars. It left one shoulder bare, was sari-styled and was based on the dress worn by Kennedy on the Cambodia visit in 1967.

In 2010 Marc Jacobs collaborated with Louis Vuitton to release a line of sari-inspired dresses made from vintage Indian saris. In 2012 Jessica Chastain wore an Alexander McQueen black sari-inspired dress to the Academy Awards. Mustafa Hassanali's gowns are frequently sari-inspired.

Other celebrities featured in sari-inspired dresses have included Freida Pinto in a black and gold gown. Sonam Kapoor walked the red carpet at Cannes in 2016 wearing a white sari-inspired figure-hugging large volume gown. The following year, in Paris, she modelled Gaultier's sari-inspired adaptation of the tuxedo. At the Vogue Women of the Year Awards in 2017, the host Archie Panjabi, wore a sari-gown embedded with colour changing LEDs, designed by Gaurav Gupta and IBM Watson.
