= Mary V. R. Thayer =

American columnist and socialite

- Born: Mary Van Rensselaer Cogswell; June 16, 1902; New York City, US
- Died: December 10, 1983 (aged 81)
- Education: Barnard College
- Occupations: Socialite, journalist, and author
- Spouse: Sigourney Thayer
- Children: 1

Mary Van Rensselaer Thayer (née Cogswell; June 16, 1902 – December 10, 1983) was an American socialite, journalist, and author. In 1929 she visited the Soviet Union and explored the Caucasus. She returned the following year. In 1931 she married Sigourney Thayer. Throughout that decade she wrote a column for the New York Journal and was a reporter in Eastern Europe in the aftermath of World War II. Thayer spent the 1950s to 1970s working for Magnum Photos and continuing to write news articles. She published two books on her close friend Jacqueline Kennedy.

== Biography ==
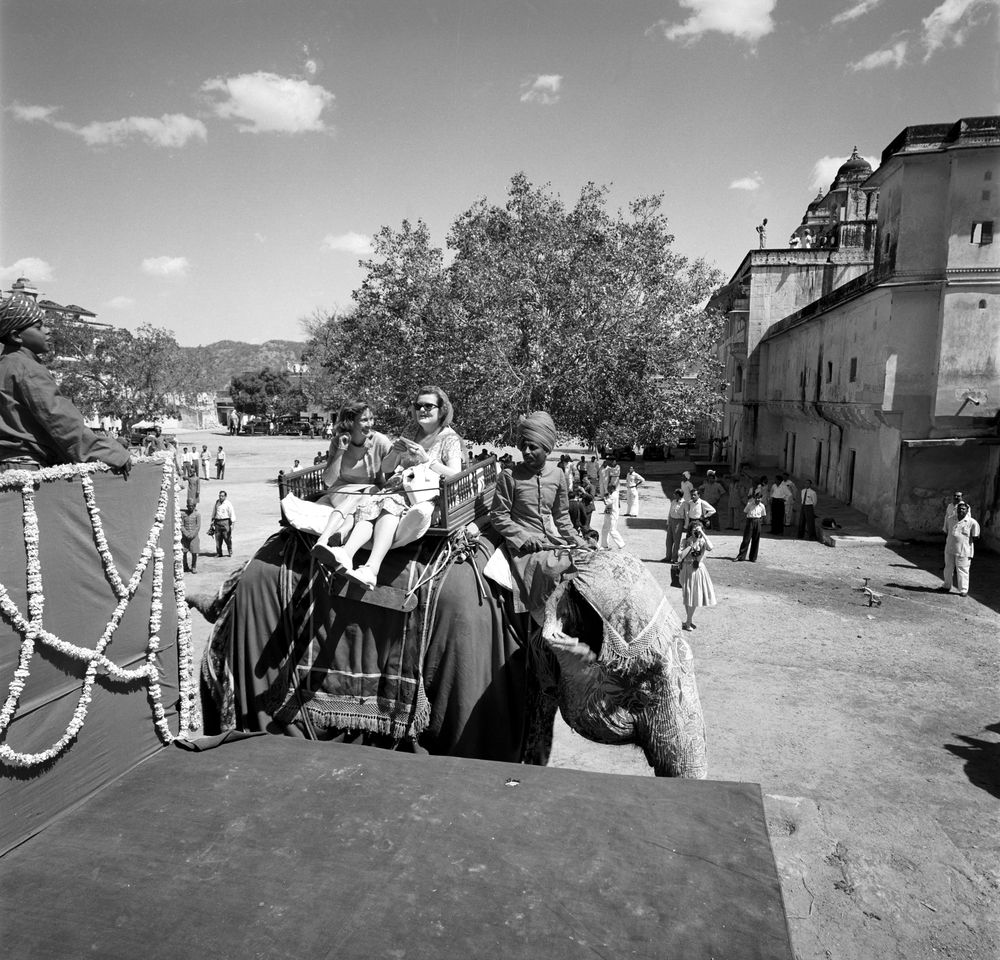
Hostess Joan Braden and journalist Molly Thayer ride an elephant in India

Mary Van Rensselaer Cogswell was born in New York City on June 16, 1902, to Cullen Van Rensselaer Cogswell and his wife. She was educated at Miss Chapin's School, and graduated from Barnard College in 1926. Cogswell visited the Soviet Union twice, in 1929 and 1930, and wrote articles about her trip. In 1929, she visited with Mabel Ingalls as part of a business trip of the Russian-American Chamber of Commerce. Cogswell arrived late without a passport, but eventually gained admission to the nation. The two women abandoned their business trip in search of adventure in the Caucasus. With a guide the women explored the region. They were briefly arrested upon suspicion of spying. They attempted to climb Mount Ararat after learning that no woman had climbed it, but were not permitted to by the government. On their way back to Moscow, the women were robbed. Though they had little money and a contemporary newspaper reported that they were "weary and very hungry", they were "happy over their experiences."

In 1931 she married Sigourney Thayer. She was eventually hired by Hearst. Throughout the 1930s she wrote under the pseudonym of "Madame Flutterby" a society column for the New York Journal. During World War II she worked in the United States Department of State in Washington, D.C. Thayer was also a lieutenant colonel in the Air Force Reserves and did some reporting from Eastern Europe when the war ended. A newspaper described her as "the only accredited woman correspondent in Eastern Europe." From 1948 to 1950 Thayer worked on the staff of The Washington Post. For the next twenty years she worked for Magnum Photos in Washington. She continued to publish news articles, covering when her close friend Jacqueline Kennedy traveled to India and Pakistan in 1962 and Hope Cooke's marriage to Palden Thondup Namgyal, the 12th Chogyal of Sikkim. She also published articles in Reader's Digest, Holiday and This Week.

In 1943 she worked with Oei Hui-lan, the wife of Chinese diplomat Wellington Koo, in publishing an autobiography. She wrote two books on Jackie Kennedy, Jacqueline Kennedy and Jacqueline Kennedy: The White House Years. She was assisted in writing both works by Kennedy herself, who edited and worked on drafting them. Kennedy also supplied Thayer with access to archival materials.

Cogswell married Sigourney Thayer in 1931. The couple had one child before his death in 1944. She survived her husband by nearly forty years, dying on December 10, 1983. The couple were both buried in Southborough Rural Cemetery, Massachusetts.
