= Hickson Inc. =

Coordinates: 40.75993°N 73.97577°W

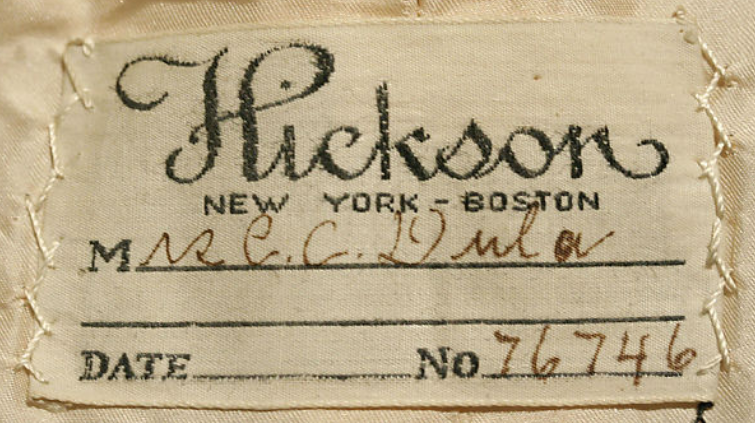
- A c. 1913 Hickson label
- Company type: Women's clothing
- Industry: Fashion
- Founded: 1902; 124 years ago in New York City, New York, United States
- Founder: Caroline "Carrie" Hickson-Kennedy; Kathryn "Kate" Hickson; Richard J. Hickson
- Defunct: September 1931; 94 years ago
- Fate: Bankrupt
- Successor: Nelson-Hickson Inc.
- Headquarters: New York, United States
- Owner: Richard J. Hickson; Leslie M. Hickson; Philip S. Crooks

Hickson Inc. was a high-class fashion retailer, designer, and department store in New York City in the early decades of the twentieth century. The firm started as a men's tailor but evolved to be what the designer Howard Greer described as "the most elegant and expensive specialty shop on Fifth Avenue."

In the 1910s, the firm dressed actresses in silent movies, and 1926, it opened a purpose-built store in a corner position on Fifth Avenue. It worked with Madeleine Vionnet and Georges Matchabelli. Charvet & Fils took space in their store. However, in 1931, at the start of the Great Depression, they filed for bankruptcy. Several Hickson creations are in the collection of the Metropolitan Museum of Art.

== History ==
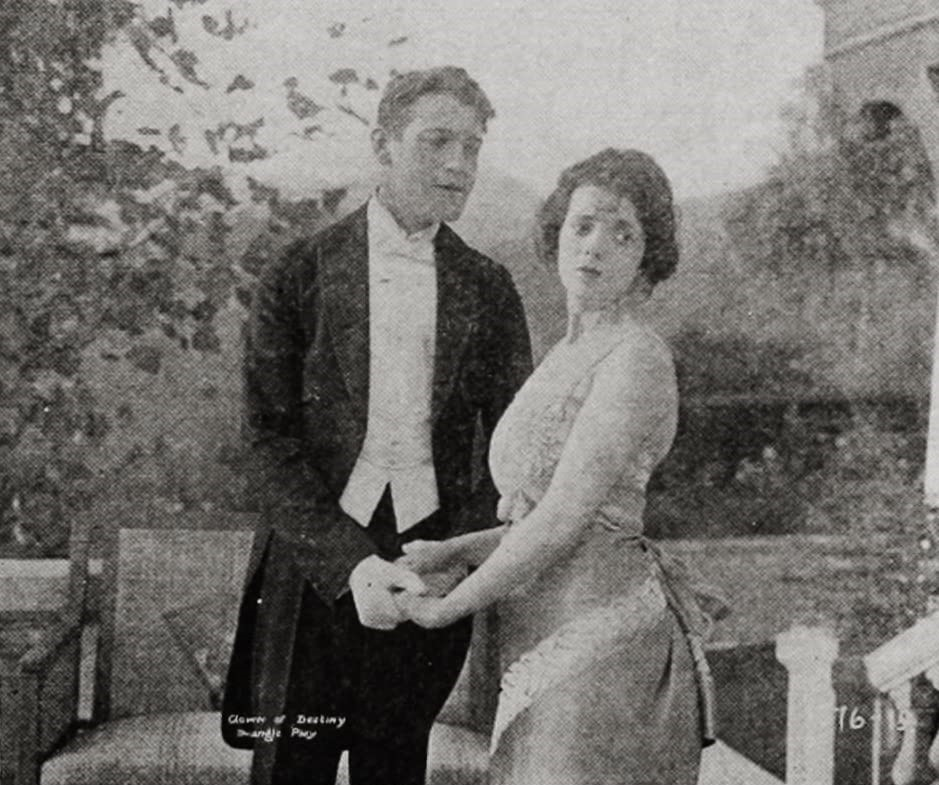
A Hickson-designed dress in the 1917 silent film The Gown of Destiny

Hickson Inc. was founded as Hickson & Company in 1902 by Caroline "Carrie" Hickson-Kennedy, Kathryn "Kate" Hickson, and Richard J. Hickson—all siblings. The company's initial headquarters were at 657 Fifth Avenue in New York City; the Hicksons founded the company with an initial investment of $800. After Kate and Carrie were killed in the 1915 sinking of the RMS Lusitania, the company was run by Richard Hickson, his son Leslie M. Hickson, and business partner Phillip S. Crooks. Richard Hickson was president of the company while Leslie Hickson and Phillip Crooks operated as its vice presidents.

The firm started as a men's tailor but evolved into a high-class dress salon that the designer Howard Greer, who worked there for a short time, described as "the most elegant and expensive specialty shop on Fifth Avenue."

In 1916, Hickson lost a suit from Boué Soeurs that alleged that they had bought that firm's garments, copied them, and sold them as their designs, as well as removing the labels from the garments they had purchased and selling them too.

Hickson provided many gowns for Pathé Exchange's series Who's Guilty? (1916). Among their designs was a light pink sari-inspired dress for the patriotic 1917 silent film The Gown of Destiny with a "bustle-back" that they invented. The light-colored dress was better suited to black and white film than a dark dress, and the film made the design popular. Although the film supported the Allied cause during World War I, as did Hickson, the firm was keen to claim that the dress was produced independently of any Parisian influence to emphasize that the American fashion industry was no longer in thrall to French influences.

In February 1921, it was reported that Hickson was to make the gown, wrap, and hat to be worn by Florence Harding at her husband's inauguration as 29th President of the United States. The color chosen was "Mrs. Harding Blue."

In 1924, Hickson began to work with Madeleine Vionnet as she re-established her business in Paris and New York after closing during World War I. Her clothes and workrooms occupied an entire floor of the Hickson premises.

In 1926, Georges Matchabelli, creator of Prince Matchabelli perfume, began appearing at Hickson to sell his fragrances and personally mixing perfumes for some of their customers.

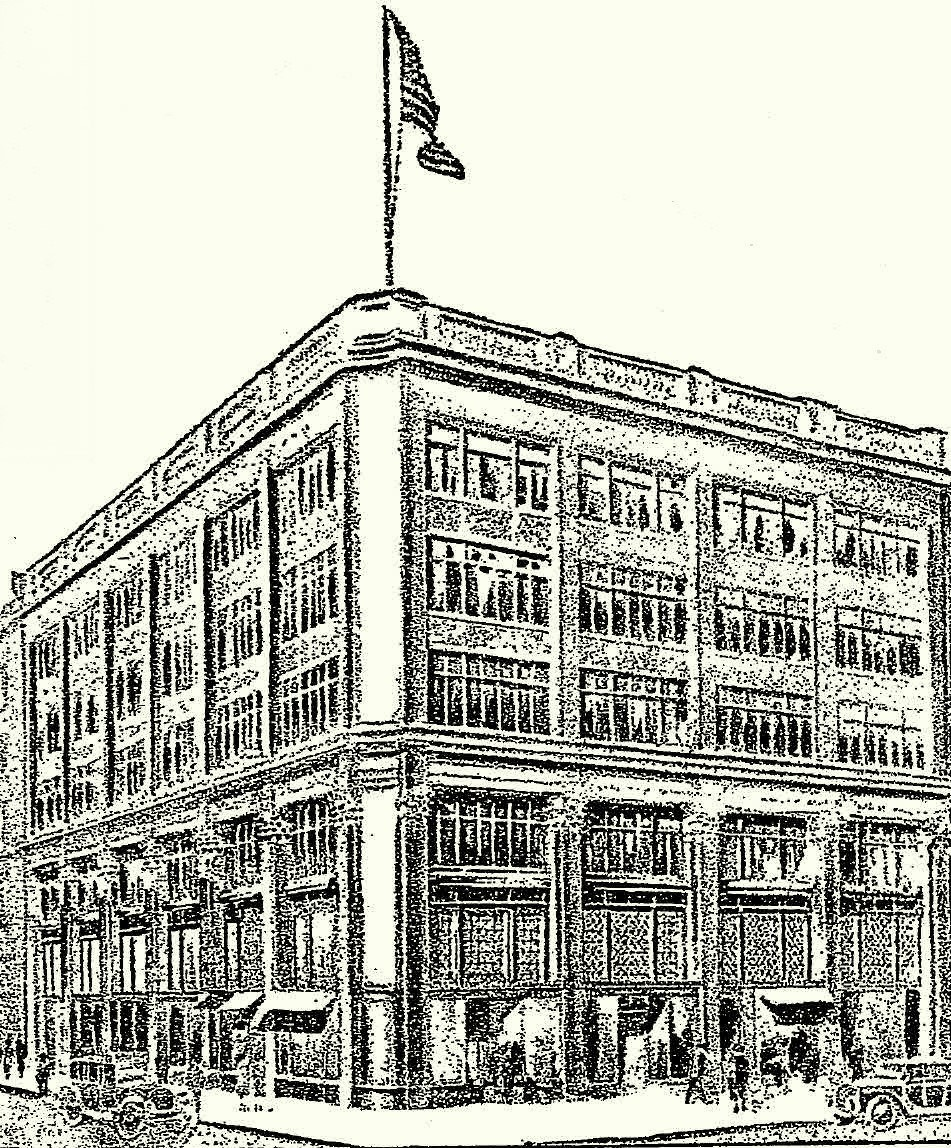
Illustration of the new Hickson building at 660 Fifth Avenue, New York. The New York Times, September 1926.

In September 1926, it was reported that on 31 December that year, the firm would open a new five-story building on Fifth Avenue on the corner of 52nd Street. The building was designed by architects Springsteen and Goldhammer in the Italian Renaissance style on the former site of the William K. Vanderbilt House. Charvet & Fils took space in the building in 1927.

In 1928, the firm suffered a burglary at the firm's 15 West 36th Street workrooms when burglars broke through a wall on the tenth floor and stole clothing valued at $30–40,000.

== Demise and legacy ==
In September 1931, the firm filed for bankruptcy with a U.S. court. Papers lodged with the court stated that an order had been lodged with the municipal court seeking to evict the firm from its 660 Fifth Avenue premises. Following bankruptcy, the rights to the firm's property and possessions were transferred to majority stakeholder Seel Singer. Singer kept the fashion retailing business going at the same 660 Fifth Avenue building; shortly after, the company was renamed to Nelson-Hickson Inc., following a partnership with clothing designer Anne Nelson. In 1938, Nelson-Hickson moved to "a charming old five-story house" at 9 West 57th.

A 1911 "walking suit" by Hickson is in the collection of the Metropolitan Museum of Art, along with a c.1913 evening dress, a 1916 evening cape and a c.1918 wool suit.
