= Sardar (horse) =

Jumping horse from Pakistan

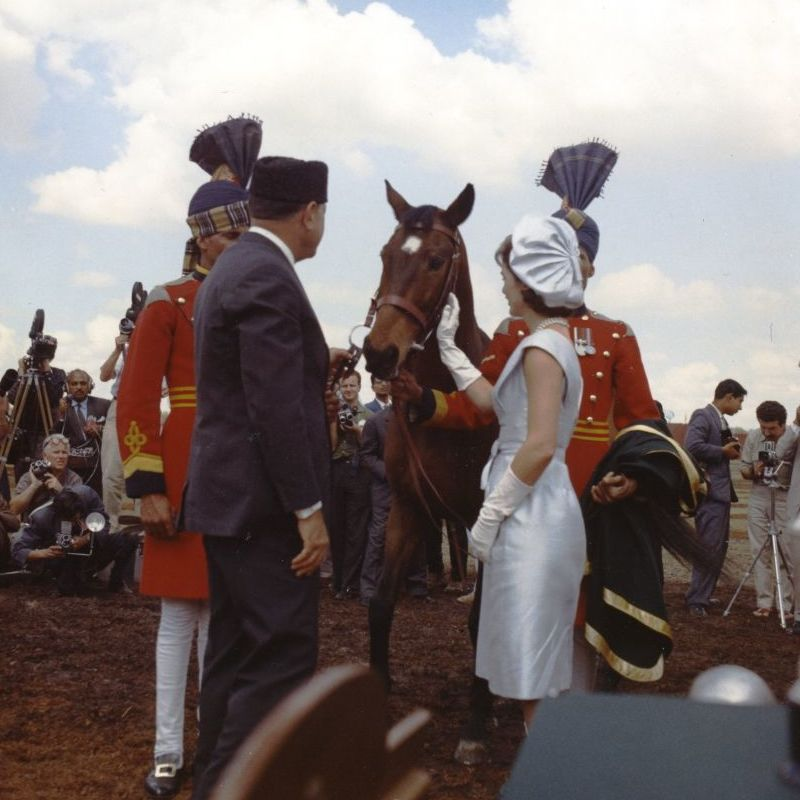
- Khan presents Kennedy with a bay gelding, 22 March 1962
- Sex: Male
- Foaled: c. 1952
- Died: Not known
- Color: Chestnut
- Owner: Jacqueline Kennedy Onassis

Sardar (Urdu: سردار, born around 1952) was a Pakistani Thoroughbred (Note: The website for Aga Khan Studs and the print source Mrs. Kennedy and Me: An Intimate Memoir by Clint Hill and Lisa McCubbin indicate that Sardar was born and bred at the Aga Khan Studs, which began breeding imported British Thoroughbred racehorses as early as 1904. However, it is unclear what Sardar's pedigree is. It is also unclear if Sardar was foaled in Pakistan, or if he was born in France or Ireland, and imported to Pakistan by Aga Khan III and Aga Khan IV, both Pakistani associates of Ayub Khan, the latter of whom gifted Sardar to Jackie Kennedy Onassis in 1962.) jumping horse belonging to Jacqueline Kennedy Onassis. He was gifted to her in 1962 during her goodwill tour of India and Pakistan as First Lady of the United States by Muhammad Ayub Khan, the then president of Pakistan.

Sardar arrived at Andrews Air Force Base in the US in April 1962, spent 34 days in quarantine and then took up residence at the Kennedy country home Glen Ora in Middleburg, Virginia.

In her memoirs, Onassis called Sardar her "favorite treasure".

== Pakistan ==
Sardar was born around 1952 at the Aga Khan Studs,, then owned and promoted by the British-educated Aga Khan III, and became an award-winning jumping horse. A bay gelding, he was chestnut in colour with a white diamond spot mid-forehead. At the age of 10 years, on 22 March 1962, the then president of Pakistan, Muhammad Ayub Khan, gifted the horse to First Lady of the United States, then known as Jacqueline Kennedy. (Note: The date is sometimes incorrectly given as 23 March.) Kennedy's goodwill tour of India and Pakistan had coincided with Pakistan's annual Horse and Cattle Show. At the show, Khan had escorted Kennedy onto the grounds and upon presenting the horse said "My dear Mrs. Kennedy, on behalf of the people of Pakistan, I present to you 'Sardar'. It is my hope that every time you ride Sardar, you will remember with fondness the time you spent in Pakistan", to which she replied "He is magnificent". According to Clint Hill, she "was stunned" and "it was love at first sight". She told him that "Mr. Hill, Sardar is mine, all mine. No one is going to be allowed to ride him except me", and then postponed the next morning's schedule so that she could ride him. In a telegram to her husband, John F. Kennedy, she tried to persuade him to arrange skipping the 30-day quarantine Sardar would have to complete upon arriving in the US.

== United States ==
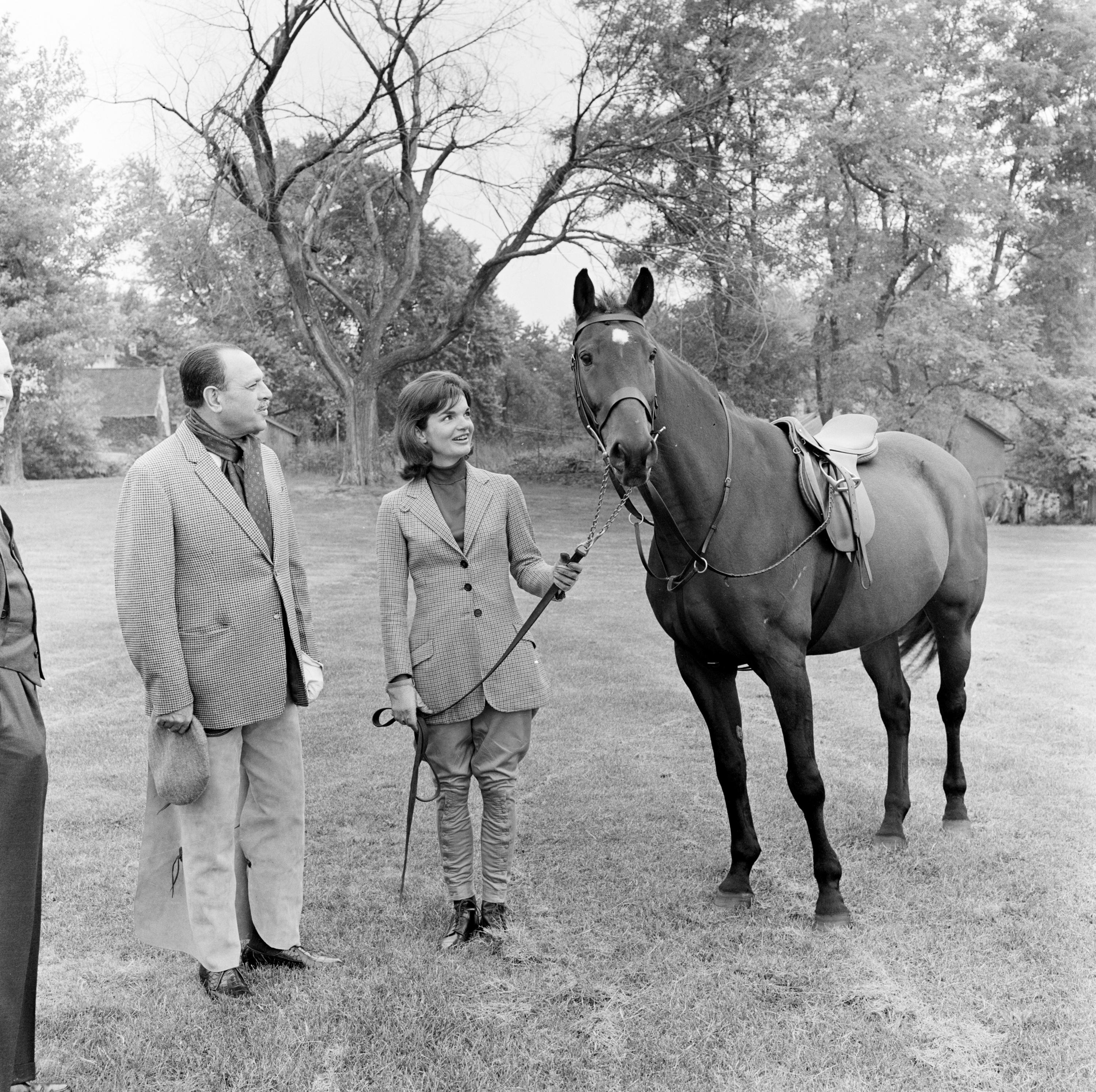
Khan, Kennedy and Sardar at Glen Ora (September 1962)

In April 1962, a couple of weeks after Kennedy's return to the US, Sardar and his trainer travelled to the US by Military Air Transport Service, which was typically making regular flights to Pakistan. They landed at Andrews Air Force Base, Sardar was quarantined for 34 days at Fort McNair, just outside Washington. In May he was taken to the Kennedy Glen Ora country home in Middleburg, Virginia. Denied military air transport, the Republican congressman Walter L. McVey Jr., complained about the influence of Sardar in travelling on an Air Force plane, though shortly apologised to Sardar for his comments.

In September 1962, Khan visited Kennedy at Glen Ora and rode alongside her and Sardar. In her memoirs, she called Sardar her "favorite treasure". Initially unkeen on spending time at the President's holiday retreat, Camp David, Kennedy had stables constructed there, which allowed her to keep and enjoy Sardar there.

Following the death of John F. Kennedy, some newspapers reported that Sardar was the prancing riderless horse behind the gun-carriage at his funeral. Pamela Turnure, Kennedy's press secretary, shortly told reporters that she was incorrect in naming Sardar as that horse, and Pierre Salinger confirmed that it was actually the army horse Black Jack.

It is assumed that Sardar spent the rest of his life with Kennedy, at the Kennedy's home, Glen Ora, Virginia, and then moved with her when she left.

== Bibliography ==
- Hill, Clint; McCubbin, Lisa (2012). Mrs. Kennedy and Me. New York: Simon and Schuster. ISBN 978-1-4516-4844-7.
