= Joan Braden =

Joan Ridley Braden
- Died: 1999
- Education: Hollins University; University of California; Los Angeles; Northwestern University
- Spouse: Tom Braden
- Children: 8

Joan Ridley Braden (died 1999) was an American journalist, writer, public relations executive, State department officer, a campaigner for John F. Kennedy and Robert F. Kennedy, and personal secretary to Nelson Rockefeller. In 1962 she accompanied First Lady Jacqueline Kennedy on Kennedy's goodwill tour of India and Pakistan.

== Early life and education ==
Joan Braden was born in Indianapolis and was brought up in Anderson, Indiana and then in Washington, where she graduated from Wilson High School before gaining a place at Hollins University, University of California, Los Angeles, and then graduating from Northwestern University.

== Career ==
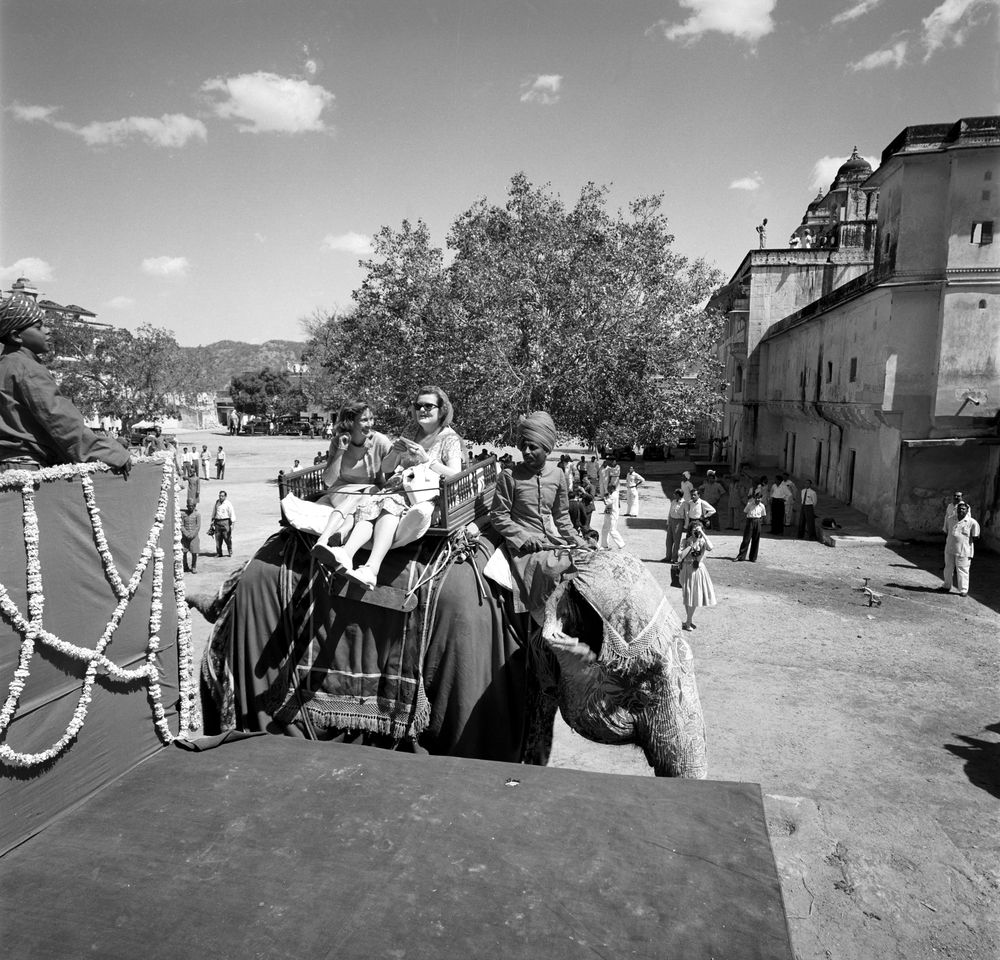
Hostess Joan Braden and journalist Molly Thayer ride an elephant in India

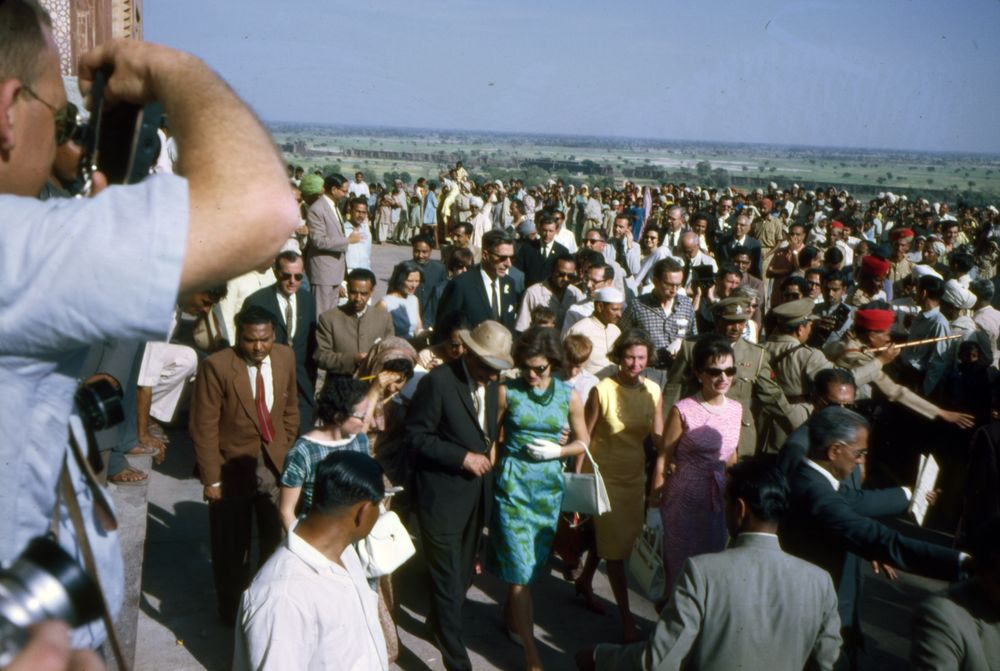
First Lady Jacqueline Kennedy Tours Fatehpur Sikri in India (Braden in yellow)

During the Second World War, Braden was one of Pentagon's civilian intelligence officers. She was later recruited as personal secretary and economic assistant to Nelson Rockefeller, in New York. In 1951 she moved to Washington.

She became a campaigner for John F. Kennedy and Robert F. Kennedy.

In 1962 she accompanied First Lady Jacqueline Kennedy on Kennedy's goodwill tour of India and Pakistan.

In 1976 Braden was appointed to then newly created role of coordinator of consumer affairs.

== Personal and family ==
She married Tom Braden in 1948 and they had eight children.

In their later years, Joan Braden and Secretary of Defense Robert McNamara had a romantic relationship after McNamara's wife Margaret McNamara had died and while Joan and Tom Braden were still married.

== Selected publications ==
- "An Exclusive Chat with Jackie Kennedy".Saturday Evening Post 235,. 12 May 1962), pp, 85–89.
- Just Enough Rope: An Intimate Memoir. Villard Books. 1989. ISBN 978-0-394-57458-5.
