= Wesley Tann =

African–American fashion designer (1928–2012)

- Tann at work, 1965
- Born: John Wesley Tann Jr; July 17, 1928; Rich Square, North Carolina, U.S.
- Died: November 23, 2012 (aged 84)
- Education: Howard University
- Occupation: Fashion designer

John Wesley Tann Jr (July 17, 1928 – November 23, 2012) was an American fashion designer. His clientele included Jacqueline Kennedy, Diahann Carroll, Carmen de Lavallade, Leontyne Price, Jennie Grossinger and several Miss Americas. His 1962 collection included several sari-inspired dresses.

In his later life, he worked in interior design, including work on The Pentagon, and later moved to Newark and taught etiquette.

A road in Newark, New Jersey, is named for him.

== Early life and education ==
John Tann was born on July 17, 1928, in Rich Square, North Carolina, to John Wesley Tann, a farmer, and Abbie (Mitchell), a dressmaker, who taught him to sew. He had a sister, Mabel. He was 13 years old when his mother died, and he moved to Washington, D.C., where he first stayed at the YMCA. He lived with congressman Rep. Adam Clayton Powell for around six years. Powell sent him to the International School of Etiquette and Protocol in Washington, and introduced him to civil rights lawyer Belford Lawson. With Powell and Lawson's help, Tann completed high school and earned a bachelor's degree from Howard University.

After a short move back to Newark, New Jersey, with his sister, he attended the Hartford Art School of Fashion in Connecticut. During his time there, he also worked in several jobs, including in dressmaking and in an aircraft factory. He was active in local theater and other social groups, and was mentioned as having a fiancée, but never married. By 1954, he was in New York, where he attended the Mayer School of Fashion, and night classes at the Fashion Institute of Technology. He had also trained under Pauline Trigère and Oscar de la Renta, among others.

== Career ==
During his time at Mayer, he worked for several companies as an assistant, including companies that made lingerie, low-cost dresses, bridal wear, cocktail dresses and sportswear. The private-label clothes producer, Mister Vee, then employed Tann in 1960.

In 1961, he formed his own company. Already in a small studio on Manhattan's West 27th Street, he opened a shop to promote other young designers. According to the New York Amsterdam News, it was on New York City's Seventh Avenue and he was the first to do so. According to Nancy Diehl, it was "outside the main industry centre on Seventh Avenue". His clientele included Jacqueline Kennedy, Diahann Carroll, Carmen de Lavallade, Leontyne Price, Jennie Grossinger and several Miss Americas. He later submitted a sheath design for Michelle Obama. In 1964, he participated in a demonstration of Picturephone technology, experimenting with how telephones could be used to sell fashion in the future. He taught and encouraged younger Black designers in New York, after his shop closed in 1965.

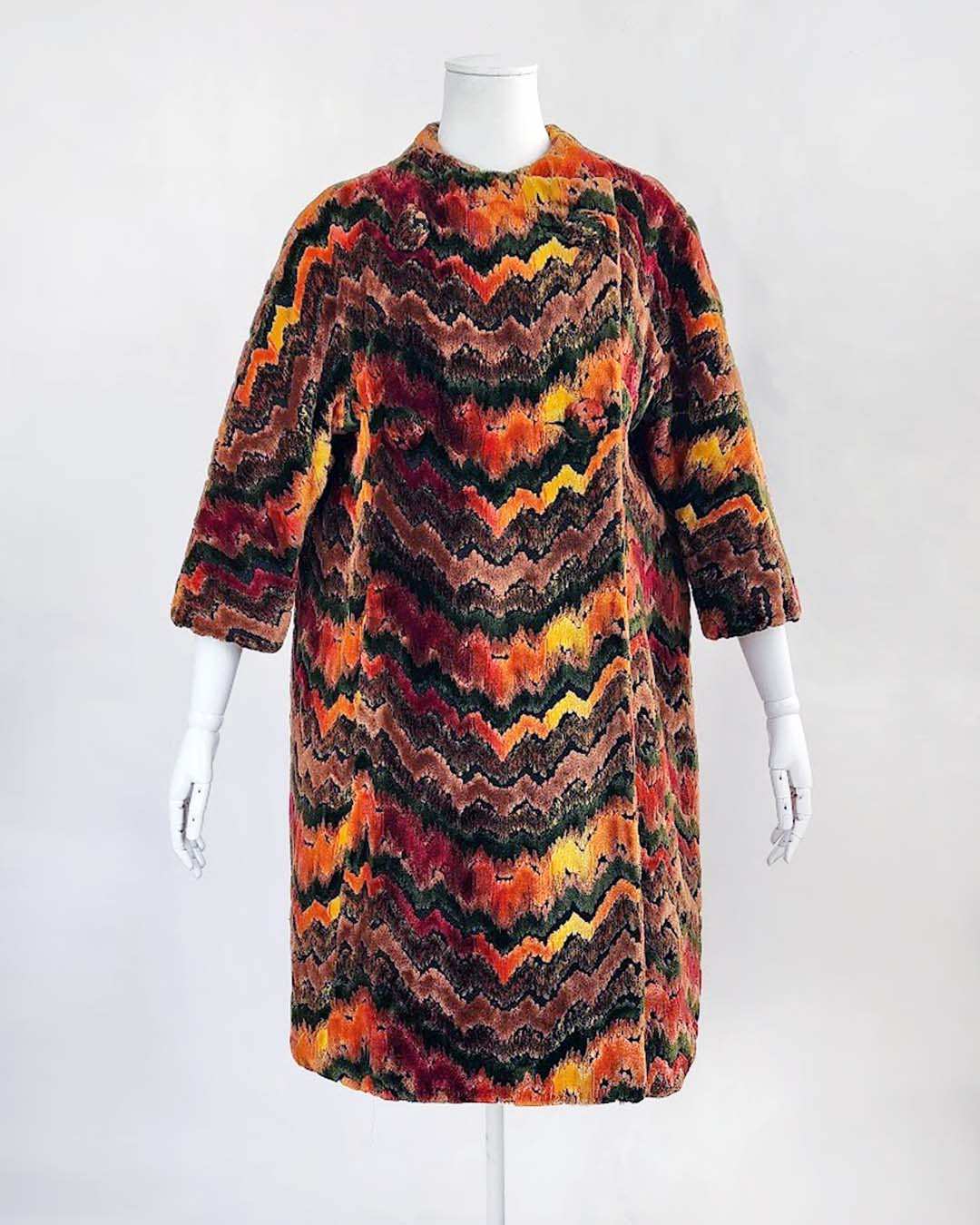
Wesley Tann cut velvet coat, ca. 1960s. Adnan Ege Kutay Collection.

Following Jacqueline Kennedy's goodwill tour of India and Pakistan in 1962, when she had brought back several saris with the intention to make them into dresses, for a short while the sari-inspired dress gained enough interest to inspire several designers including Tann to design dresses based on the sari. Tann produced several dresses using saris including two that featured in The New York Times and that became available at Henri Bendel; a turquoise and gold silk Chanel-style suit and a two-piece red and gold dress. Joseph Horne Company in Philadelphia also stocked several of Tann's sari-inspired dresses.

In 1962 he told the Baltimore Afro-American that "my color has helped me rather than hurt me ... If I had a good garment to offer and others had the same, I stood out because I was black. This gave me more attention and thus more attention was directed to my garment and its workmanship." In his later years, he told The Star-Ledger that his color had made it difficult to obtain the fabrics he needed.

Subsequently, he worked in interior design, including work on The Pentagon. Later in life, Tann returned to Newark, and taught etiquette and decorating classes. He also donated his time and talents to decorating homes for Newark's Habitat for Humanity program.

== Recognition ==
In the 1960s, Women's Wear Daily called him a "young individualist" and noted that Tann always designed completely lined dresses and his ideas were "bold" with "careful workmanship". In 1973 Women's Wear Daily featured Tann in an article titled "The American Spirit of '73", in which they credited his early pioneering work in fashion. J. C. Penney featured Tann in a page giving tribute to Black Americans in 1999; it was published in several publications. In 2004, the Fashion and Arts Xchange credited him with "pioneering contributions". In 2007, Ebony called him "among the first Blacks to have a successful and visible clothing business in the country's fashion centre on Seventh Avenue in New York". He was part of two museum exhibitions; Black Style Now, at the Museum of the City of New York in 2006 and 2007, and at the Museum of Fashion Institute of Technology's Black Fashion Designers exhibition in 2016 and 2017.

== Death and legacy ==
Tann died on November 23, 2012. A road in Newark, New Jersey, is named for him.
