= William K. Vanderbilt House =

Demolished mansion in Manhattan, New York

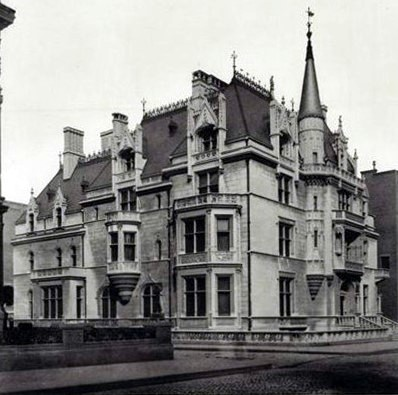
- The Petit Chateau in 1886.
- Interactive map of the William K. Vanderbilt House area

General information
- Architectural style: Châteauesque (Renaissance Revival architecture)
- Location: Manhattan
- Coordinates: 40.76003°N 73.97647°W
- Construction started: 1878
- Completed: 1882
- Demolished: 1927

The William K. Vanderbilt House, also known as the Petit Chateau, was a Châteauesque mansion at 660 Fifth Avenue in Midtown Manhattan, New York City, on the northwest corner of Fifth Avenue and 52nd Street. It was across the street from the Triple Palace of William Henry Vanderbilt, which occupied the entire block between 51st and 52nd Streets on the west side of Fifth Avenue.

== History ==
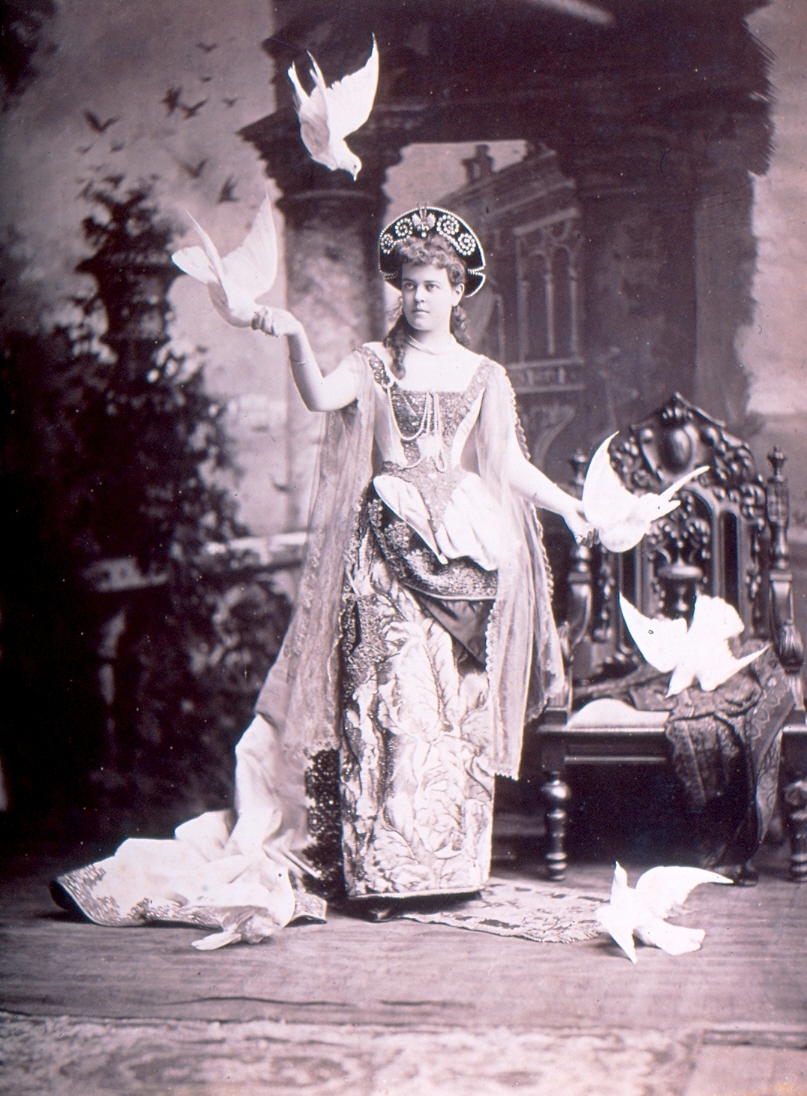
Alva Vanderbilt at her official opening of the chateau in March 1883, held with a masquerade ball for 1000 guests and reportedly costing $3 million.

The mansion was built for William Kissam Vanderbilt, second son of William H. Vanderbilt and Maria Louisa Kissam from 1878 to 1882. Determined to make her mark in New York society, Vanderbilt's wife Alva worked with the architect, Richard Morris Hunt, to create the French Renaissance-style chateau. Her renowned fancy-dress ball, held here in March 1883 and attended by a thousand people, captured the public's attention. The structure, a reflection of Alva's love of all things French, was one of the earliest chateau style mansions in New York City and served as inspiration for many later designs throughout the country by Hunt and others.

It was sold to real-estate developer Benjamin Winter, Sr. in 1926, demolished in 1927, and replaced by a commercial building for the fashion retailers Hickson Inc. In a draft of her memoirs, Alva, then Mrs. Belmont, merely noted the demolition in passing. The site is currently occupied by the 660 Fifth Avenue office building.

== Design ==
Although William Vanderbilt was involved in some of the design of the house, it was primarily a result of the collaboration of Alva Vanderbilt and the architect. Hunt used a blending of late French Gothic style and Beaux-Arts refinement for the design of the three-and-a-half-story mansion.

=== Facade ===
The elaborate asymmetrical facade was faced in gray Indiana limestone, with an irregular roof of blue-gray slate trimmed with copper. The masonry firm of Ellin and Kitson executed the extensive exterior and interior stone carving, reportedly employing more than 40 artisans. Contemporary architectural critics generally gave good reviews of the design, with most noting that this was not, as had previously been the case with Carpenter Gothic architecture, the pasting of Gothic detail onto an essentially American frame building.

=== Interior ===
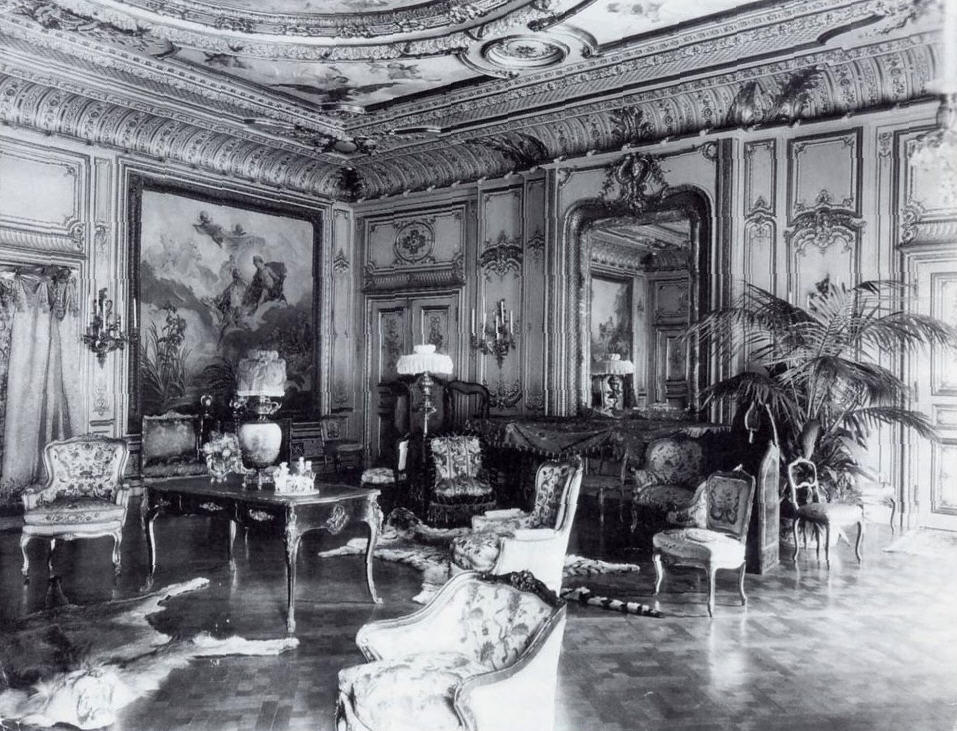
The salon, designed and built by Jules Allard.

The interior was entered from Fifth Avenue via an entrance vestibule. The vestibule opened onto a 60-foot (18 m) long grand hall, which could be used to access all of the primary first floor rooms. The grand hall was faced in Caen stone, as was much of the interior. It was worked and carved with decorative relief. Forming a "T" off of the right-hand center of the grand hall was the stone grand staircase, with a huge elaborately carved fireplace on the opposite facing wall.

The first of the principal rooms upon entering the grand hall from the east was the 18-by-14-foot (5.5 m × 4.3 m) library, with 16th century French Renaissance panelling covering the walls. On the opposite side was the 33-by-18-foot (10.1 m × 5.5 m) parlor. It featured panelling in walnut, carved in the style of Grinling Gibbons. Next to the parlor was the Louis Quinze-style 33-by-38-foot (10 m × 12 m) salon, designed and built in Paris by Jules Allard. This room helped launch the taste in New York for French 18th century-style interiors. Its most important piece of furniture was an ebony secretary, now in the Metropolitan Museum of Art, that was built by Jean Henri Riesener for the use of Marie Antoinette at the Château de Saint-Cloud. The focal point of the salon was the ceiling, painted with a mythological scenes by Paul-Jacques-Aimé Baudry. He had recently completed ceiling paintings for the Palais Garnier. Beyond the salon was the 20-by-27-foot (6.1 m × 8.2 m) breakfast room and an adjoining butler's pantry. At the western end of the grand hall one entered the banquet hall. At 50 by 35 feet (15 m × 11 m) and two stories high, it was the largest room in the house. It was Gothic in style, with seven foot high wainscoting, topped with Caen stone walls. One end of the room contained a massive double fireplace with marble caryatids supporting an oak over-mantel by Karl Bitter. A second floor gallery topped the fireplace ensemble. The opposite end of the room featured a musicians gallery. The banquet hall was illuminated by a large stained glass window by Eugène Oudinot.

== See also ==
- List of Gilded Age mansions
- Vanderbilt Triple Palace
