= Blue and green cotton shift dress of Jacqueline Kennedy =

Dress worn during Jacqueline Kennedy's tour of India

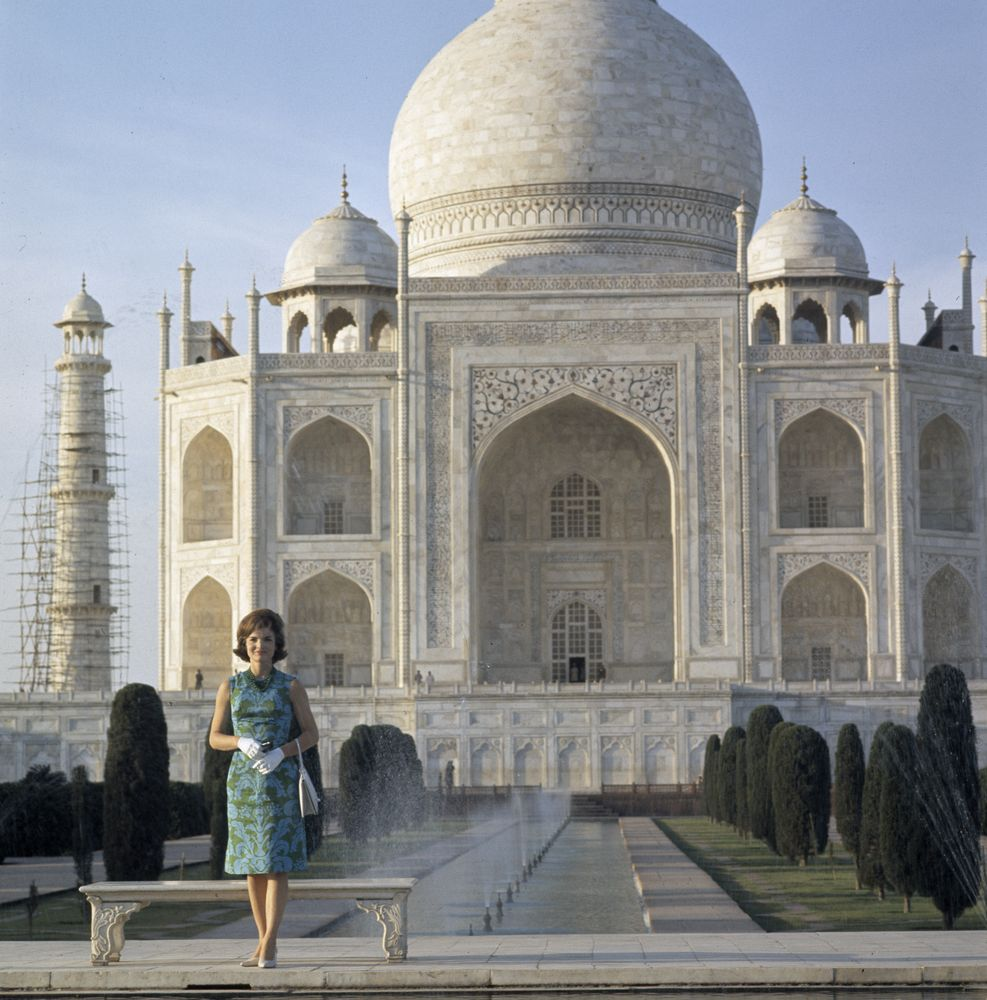
- Jacqueline Kennedy at the Taj Mahal (15 March 1962)
- Designer: Joan "Tiger" Morse
- Year: 1962
- Type: Shift dress

Jacqueline Kennedy wore a blue and green cotton shift dress during her daytime visit to the Taj Mahal in 1962, as part of her goodwill tour of India, having also visited the monument in moonlight. Designed by Joan "Tiger" Morse, the dress was sleeveless and in contrast to her other pastel coloured shiny silks, this dress had a large floral print and was made in brocade.

== Gallery ==
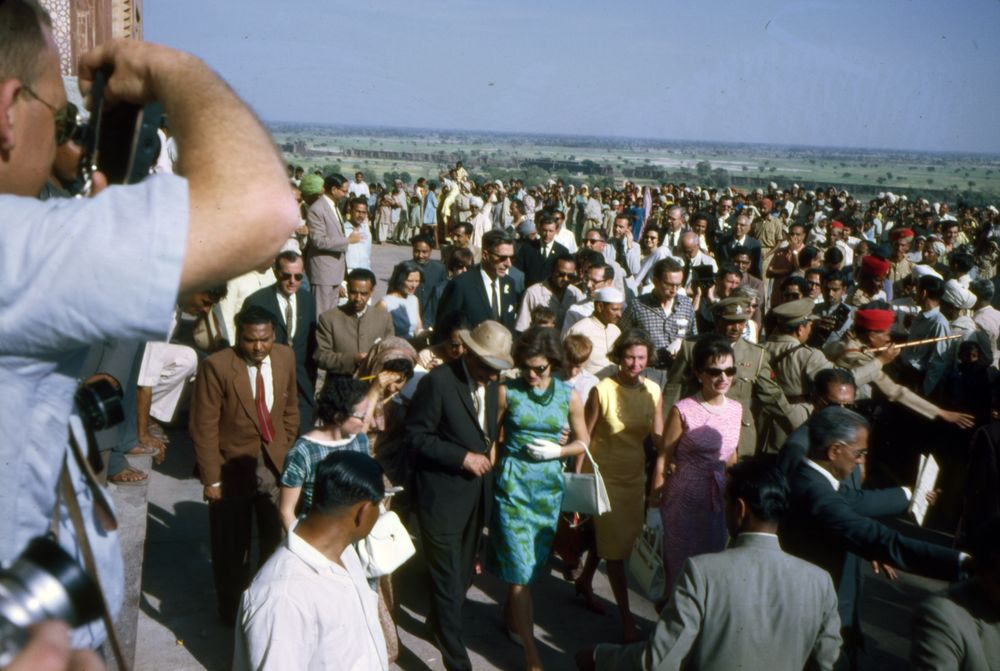
Kennedy tours Fatehpur Sikri

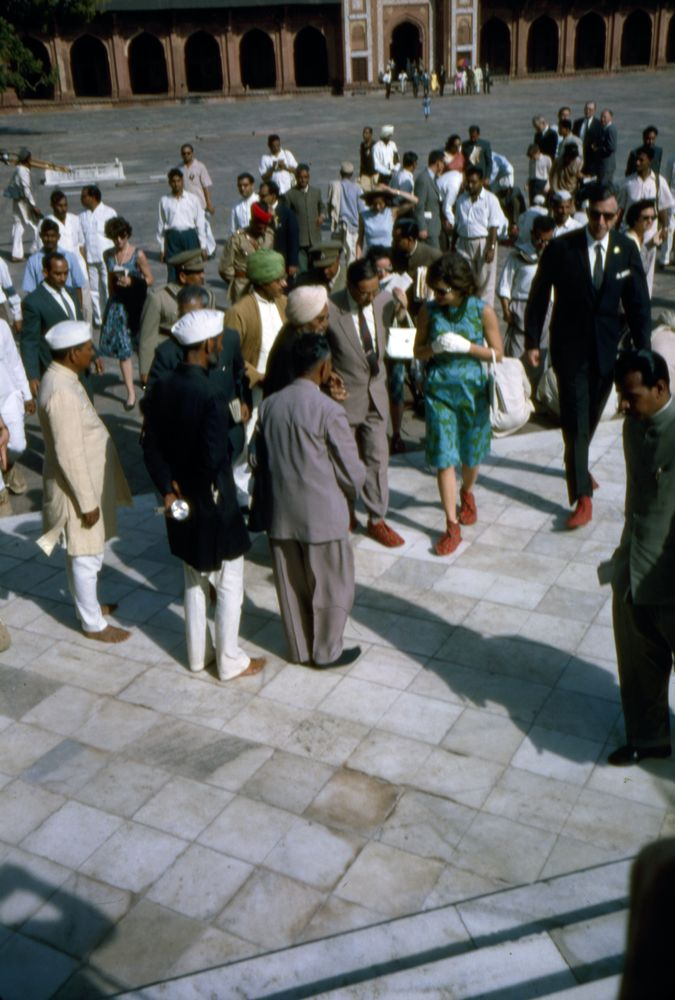
Kennedy tours Fatehpur Sikri

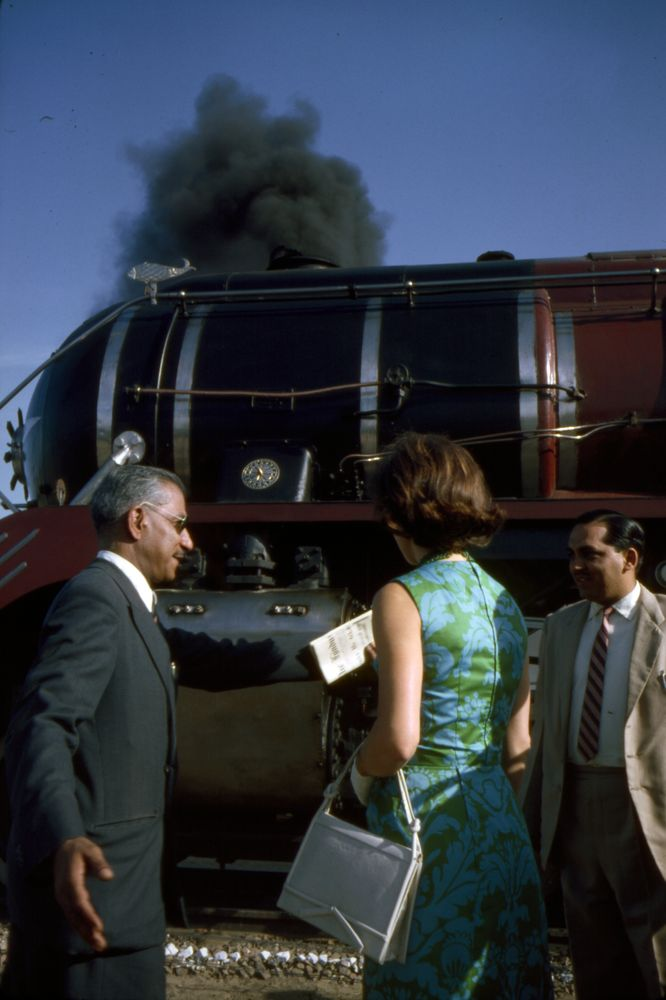
Kennedy at a train station

== See also ==
- List of individual dresses
