= A Second Paradise: Indian Courtly Life, 1590-1947 =

1985 book

- Author: Naveen Patnaik
- Language: English
- Published: 1985
- Publisher: Doubleday

A Second Paradise: Indian Courtly Life, 1590-1947, is a book authored by Naveen Patnaik, illustrated by Bannu, edited by Jacqueline Kennedy, and published by Doubleday in 1985. Following her 1962 goodwill tour of India and Pakistan, Kennedy returned to India in 1984 and travelled with Patnaik to research Indian artwork.
