= Mona Lisa exhibition, United States =

Art exhibition

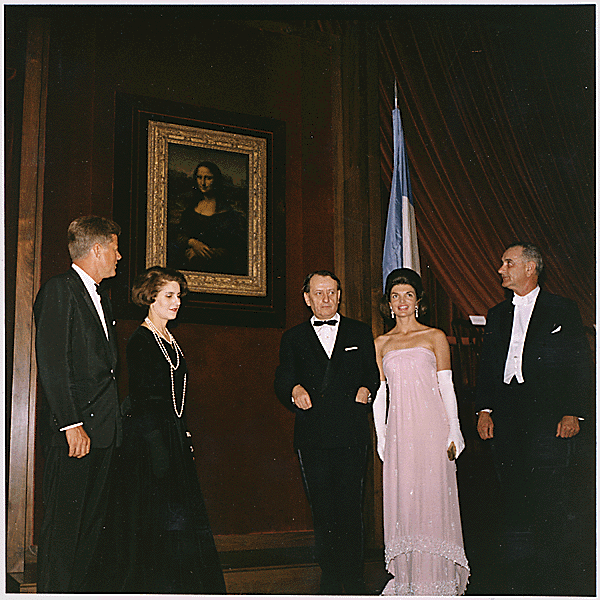
- JFK, Jackie, André Malraux, Lyndon B. Johnson, unveiling the Mona Lisa, 8 January 1963
- Date: 1963

The Mona Lisa was exhibited in the United States in 1963, after traveling aboard the SS United States. Planned by Jacqueline Kennedy and André Malraux, it was first displayed at the National Gallery of Art in Washington, D.C., with around 2,000 dignitaries including John F. Kennedy at the first showing, followed by 500,000 people over the next three weeks. It was then transferred to the Metropolitan Museum of Art, New York, where a further one million people viewed it.
