= Jacqueline Kennedy's 1962 goodwill tour of India and Pakistan =

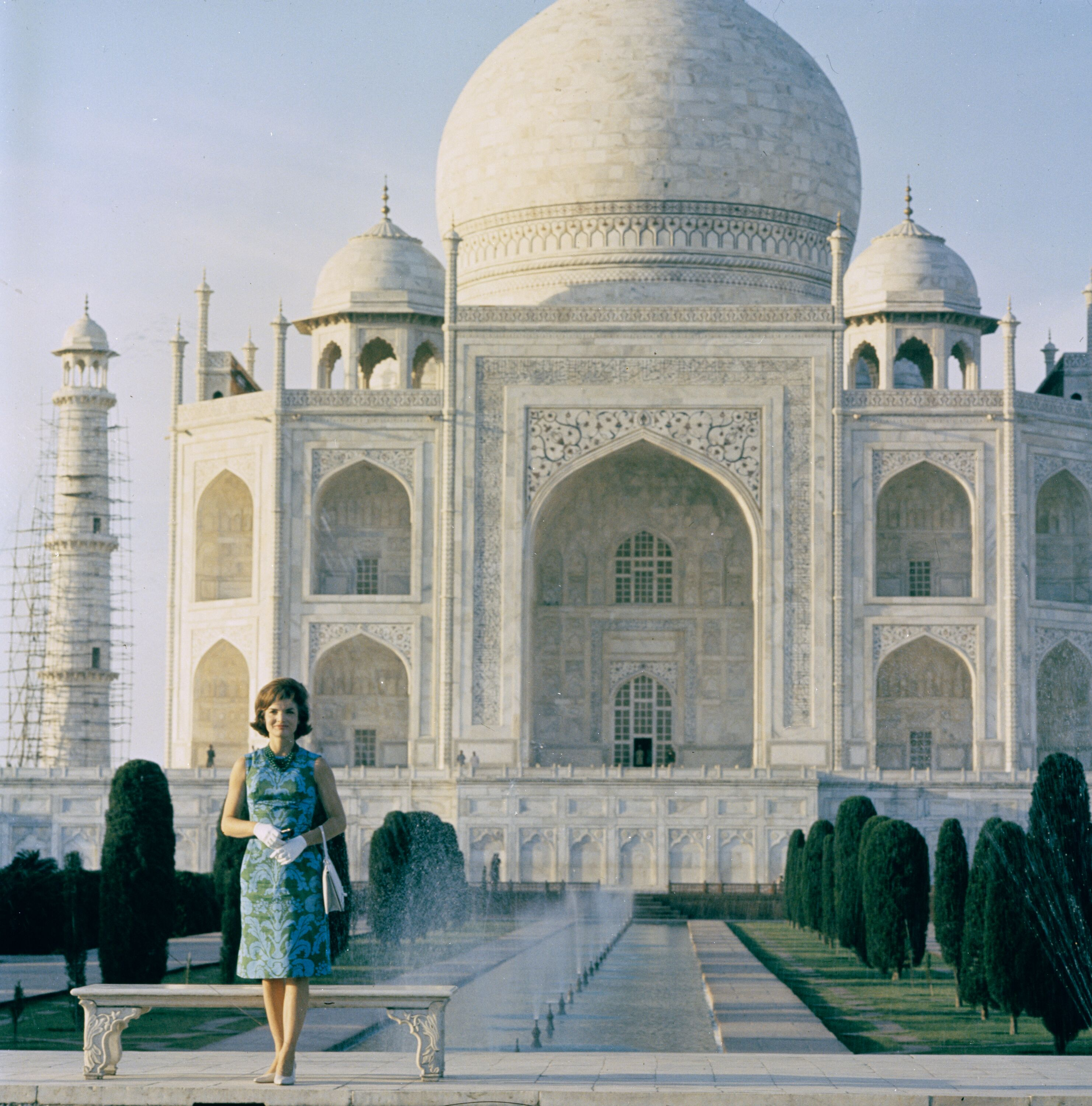
Kennedy at the Taj Mahal, 15 March 1962

In March 1962, Jacqueline Kennedy embarked on a goodwill tour of India and Pakistan, serving in an unofficial diplomatic capacity. While media attention largely focused on her fashion and public image, the visit also marked a deepening of her engagement with the arts and architecture of the region. In subsequent years, she returned to India to co-produce a publication on Indian art.

Accompanied by her sister Lee Radziwill, and as guest of U.S. ambassador to India John Kenneth Galbraith, Kennedy arrived in New Delhi on 12 March on an Air India flight. She spent time with Prime Minister Jawaharlal Nehru before visiting Fatehpur Sikri, Agra, Varanasi, Udaipur and Jaipur. On 21 March, Kennedy left India to begin a five day tour in Pakistan, where she was greeted by President Ayub Khan.

American magazine Life estimated Kennedy wore 22 different outfits during her first nine days in India. The goodwill tour likely influenced some of Kennedy's later sari-like gowns. Some criticism was made of Kennedy being kept away from India's poverty, but the whole tour was generally aired favourably by the press. In 2019, her sister's personal photo albums of the trip went on auction at Christie's, New York.

== Planning ==
According to United States Secret Service agent Clint Hill, a plan for a 17-day goodwill tour to India by Jacqueline Kennedy was eventually trimmed to nine. The private visit was initially scheduled for January 1962, but rescheduled for March due to at first the then recent annexation of Goa and resulting deterioration in US-Indian relations, and then Kennedy's cold. It was made semi-official and extended with five additional days in Pakistan. The combined trip came to be known as the "goodwill tour". Her purpose was to improve relations with the US. According to Joan Braden, one of the reporters on the tour, Kennedy did much background reading on Indian history beforehand. This included reading several volumes of Sarvepalli Radhakrishnan's books on philosophy.

India's ambassador to the U.S., Braj Kumar Nehru, noted in his memoirs that on her husband's instruction, Kennedy sought his advice as to how to make the greatest possible "public impression in India for American friendship for and appreciation of India". Nehru suggested she travel by Air India. The interior of the aircraft front, for the sisters, was transformed to provide as much comfort as Air Force One, and to the rear accommodated a large press team. The United States Information Agency prioritised the tour as important enough to allocate its filming to a Hollywood producer and cameraman, rather than the usual documentary team. Accompanying Kennedy were speech writers, personal attendants, photographers, aides and secret service agents. She also had with her, Tish Baldridge, her secretary, and Cecil W. Stoughton, the official tour photographer.

== India tour ==
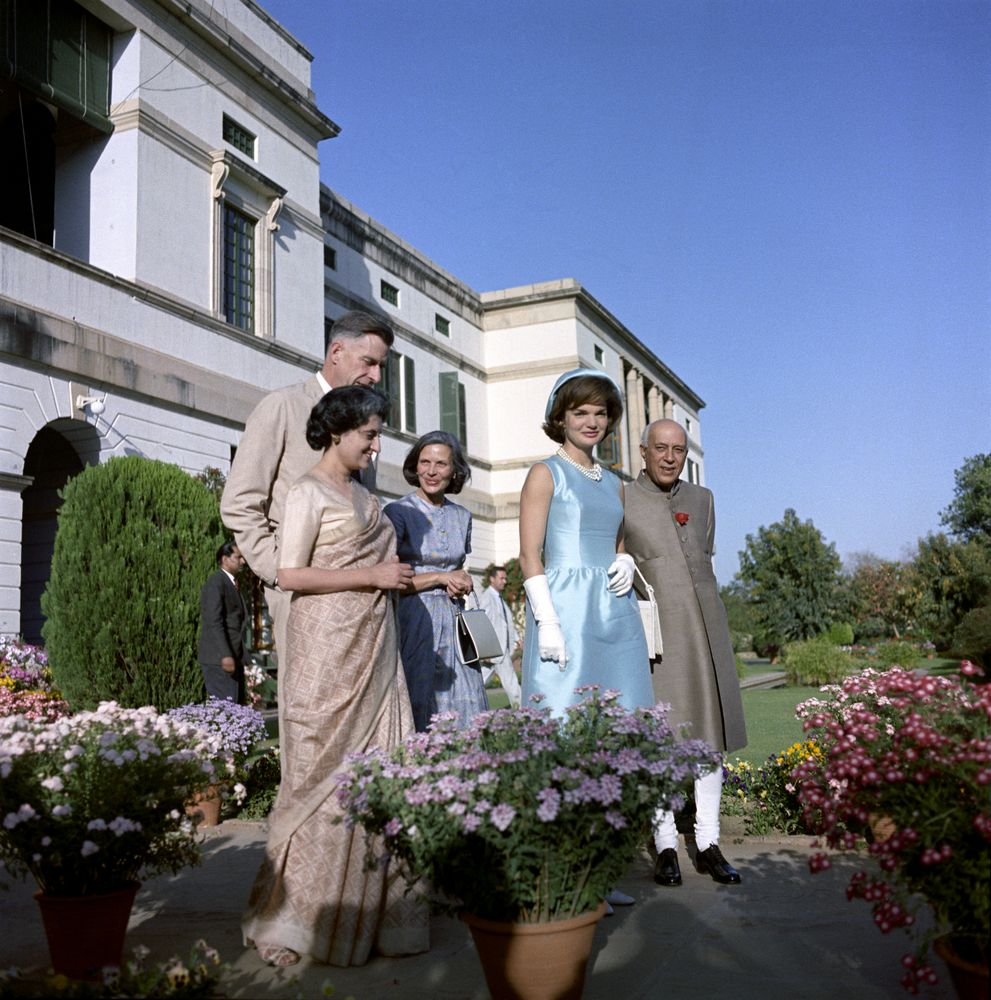
Kennedy with Jawaharlal Nehru and his daughter Indira Gandhi

Kennedy was accompanied by her sister Lee Radziwill and her maid Providencia Paredes. Following a visit to Pope John XXIII, they left Rome on the Air India flight and arrived at Palam Airport, New Delhi, on 12 March 1962, where Jawaharlal Nehru, then India's Prime Minister, and B. K. Nehru were there to greet her. Having circled the airfield several times due to Kennedy not being ready, B. K. Nehru described her eventual appearance from the aircraft as "a vision of beauty, perfectly coiffed and clothed". A red carpet had been rolled out on the runway and she was followed by her host, John Kenneth Galbraith, the United States ambassador to India. Dinner on the first night was at Teen Murti Bhavan, Jawaharlal Nehru's residence.

On 14 March, Kennedy presented Indira Gandhi with a children's art-making programme, an idea developed by Victor D'Amico to encourage children to express themselves through art. The two sisters, Galbraith and his wife, B. K. Nehru who was now Kennedy's guest in India, and Soonu Kapadia, Kennedy's liaison officer in India, departed Delhi by railway. She visited Fatehpur Sikri and Agra. At Kennedy's request, they continued their journey to Varanasi by rail, and then by air to Udaipur, where they stayed at the Fortress Palace of the Maharana for two nights. Among the guests were Pamela Mountbatten. The next stop was Jaipur, where they stayed one night at Raj Bhavan, followed by two nights at the Maharaja's Palace. In Jaipur, the sisters rode on an elephant. They subsequently travelled to Amber Fort by car, before staying at City Palace. Kennedy then returned to Delhi to attend a dinner at the Embassy of the United States hosted by Galbraith. He later recalled that in India Kennedy "developed her interest in Indian art and architecture". In Delhi, she was escorted around the Central Cottage Industries Emporium by Prem Bery. On her last day in India, the Prime Minister helped her make a selection from the one hundred books she ordered on Mughal art. That day also coincided with Holi, when she accepted a mark of colour on her forehead. But, as recalled by B.K. Nehru, when he painted her nose green, she responded by throwing the whole bowl of green colour over him. Later, on her return to the US, she told Braden that she was glad to have played Holi against the advice of the Secret Service who told her the colour was made from manure.

== Pakistan tour ==
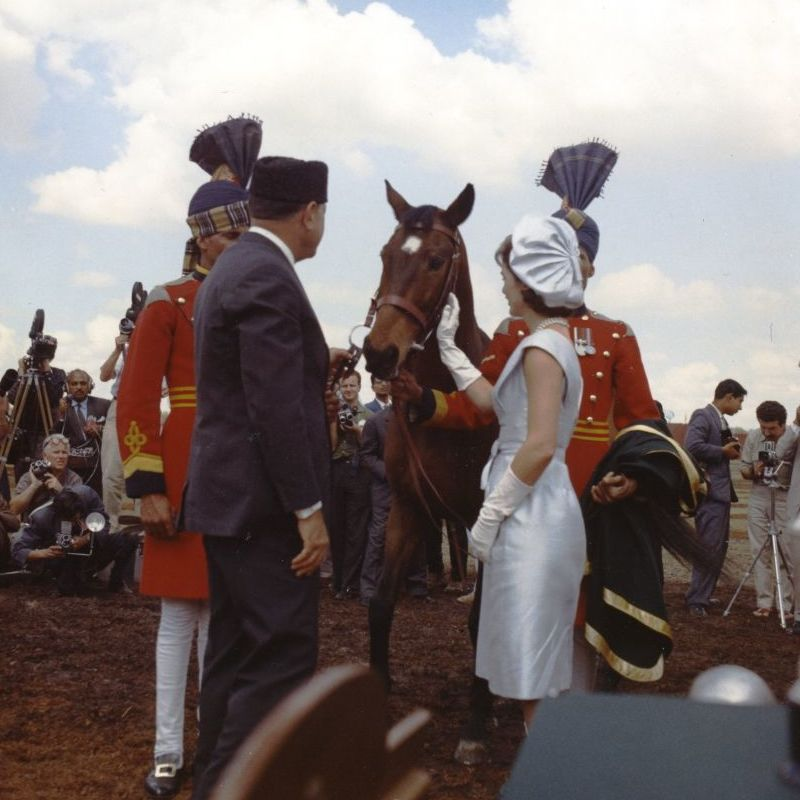
Pakistan President Mohammed Ayub Khan presents Kennedy with a bay gelding as a gift, 22 March 1962

Kennedy arrived in Pakistan on 21 March 1962, on a Pakistan Air Force aircraft. She was greeted at the airport by the US Ambassador to Pakistan Walter P. McConaughy, and Pakistan's President Mohammad Ayub Khan. During the party laid out for her in Lahore, he gave her a pearl necklace set with rubies, emeralds and diamonds. One of her trips, accompanied by Nawab Malik Amir Mohammad Khan, included greeting Pathan tribal leaders at Jamrud Fort near the Khyber Pass. In Pakistan, she watched a show with dancing horses and camels, and visited Shalimar Bagh. At the Governor's Palace he presented her with a horse named 'Sardar'. On her last day in Pakistan, when Kennedy asked Khan if she could try on his karakul hat, she liked it, and he gifted it to her.

== Fashion style ==
Kennedy's fashion style, which she preferred not to talk about, was a regular topic of discussion in the media by the time of her India and Pakistan tour. It was not her intention to have her wardrobe a focus of attention. Worried about the response to her expensive wardrobe, she jokingly told her press secretary that "if you say anything, tell them it's secondhand and that I bought everything at the Ritz Thrift Shop".

Working for the Chicago Daily News, Keyes Beech was one of the foreign correspondents who covered what they called Kennedy's "glorified fashion show". Life magazine estimated that during the India trip alone, she wore 22 different outfits, some designed by Joan "Tiger" Morse. When she visited the Taj Mahal, she was photographed in a Morse designed green and blue floral-print cotton shift dress. Several of her gowns were designed by Oleg Cassini. He later recalled that " for the trip to India, I wanted Jackie to stand out, and we both felt that the visual impact of colour was important". Her outfit colours therefore included bright pinks, green and white. For the cruise along Lake Pichola, she wore an apricot silk zibeline, and in the silk markets of Benares, she was in lavender. Her maid, Provy, took care of Kennedy's packing and had been taught how to set her hair. According to Braden, Kennedy was generally quiet and kept reporters guessing her thoughts, the result of which was that they had "little more to scribble down than her "how sweet" when she saw camels dance or her "oh, how magnificent"" when she first saw the Taj Mahal".

== Response ==
Life dedicated several pages to the trip, the national press detailed every outfit both the sisters wore, and Newsweek gave the tour a mention as a "smash hit". Elle Magazine hired Jacqueline Duheme to document the trip in a series of miniature watercolours. LIFE reported that despite smaller crowds than others such as the Queen had attracted, “she [nevertheless] conducted herself magnificently. It also reported that "days after she had gone people still called her "America Rani, Queen of America". "Her every seam has been the subject of hypnotized attention from the streets of Delhi to the Khyber Pass", the journalist Anne Chamberlin reported. Fashion historian Kimberly Chrisman-Campbell included the dress worn outside the Taj Mahal in her 2019 book Worn on This Day: The Clothes That Made History. Kennedy herself described the tour as "a dream". Criticism did appear in the Indian Press, who argued that Kennedy had not been exposed to poverty in India. Biographer Barbara Leaming, noted that Kennedy's success in India added pressure to do likewise in Pakistan, and her five days there received a favourable response in the media. The New York Times columnist Charlotte Curtis credited the success as due to what in her opinion Kennedy stood for... "foreign languages and an effort to understand foreign people in a country that tends to think it is the only country and that English is the only language." The detail to her fashion style in news reports often diverted attention from the initial purpose of the visit.

== Influence and legacy ==
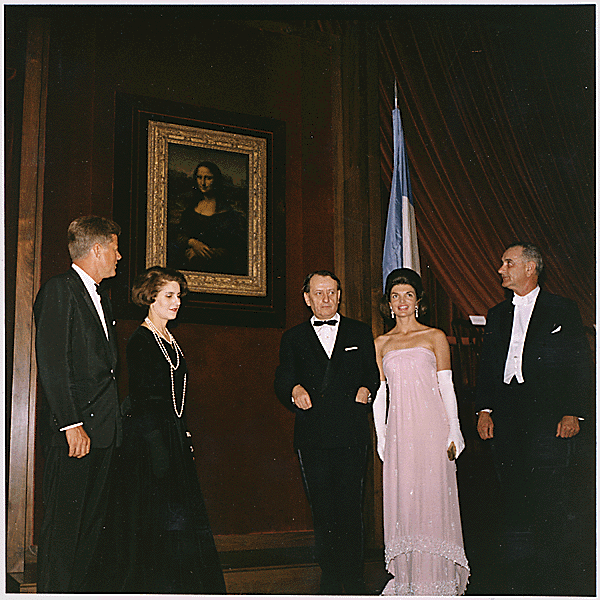
Kennedy in a pink sari-inspired dress made by Oleg Cassini, 1963

According to biographer Tina Santi Flaherty, "Kennedy was taken by the way the sari was draped". Her visit to India likely influenced some of her later outfits. She had bought back several saris with the intention to make them into dresses and upon her return to the US had for a short while popularised the sari and inspired several designers including Wesley Tann to design sari-inspired dresses.

Following the tour, Jawaharlal Nehru kept a photograph of Kennedy in his private study for the rest of his life. Like Kennedy, 30 years later Princess Diana was also photographed alone in front of the Taj Mahal.

Radziwill's personal photo albums of the trip went on auction at Christie's, New York, in 2019. One blue album with 89 photographs is titled “Visit of Mrs. John F. Kennedy to India (March 1962)”. Photographs of her tour of Pakistan appear in a green album inscribed “Visit to Pakistan, March 21–26, 1962”. Kennedy returned to India in 1984 and travelled with Naveen Patnaik researching Indian artwork and editing a book on the topic, titled A Second Paradise: Indian Courtly Life, 1590-1947.

== Gallery ==
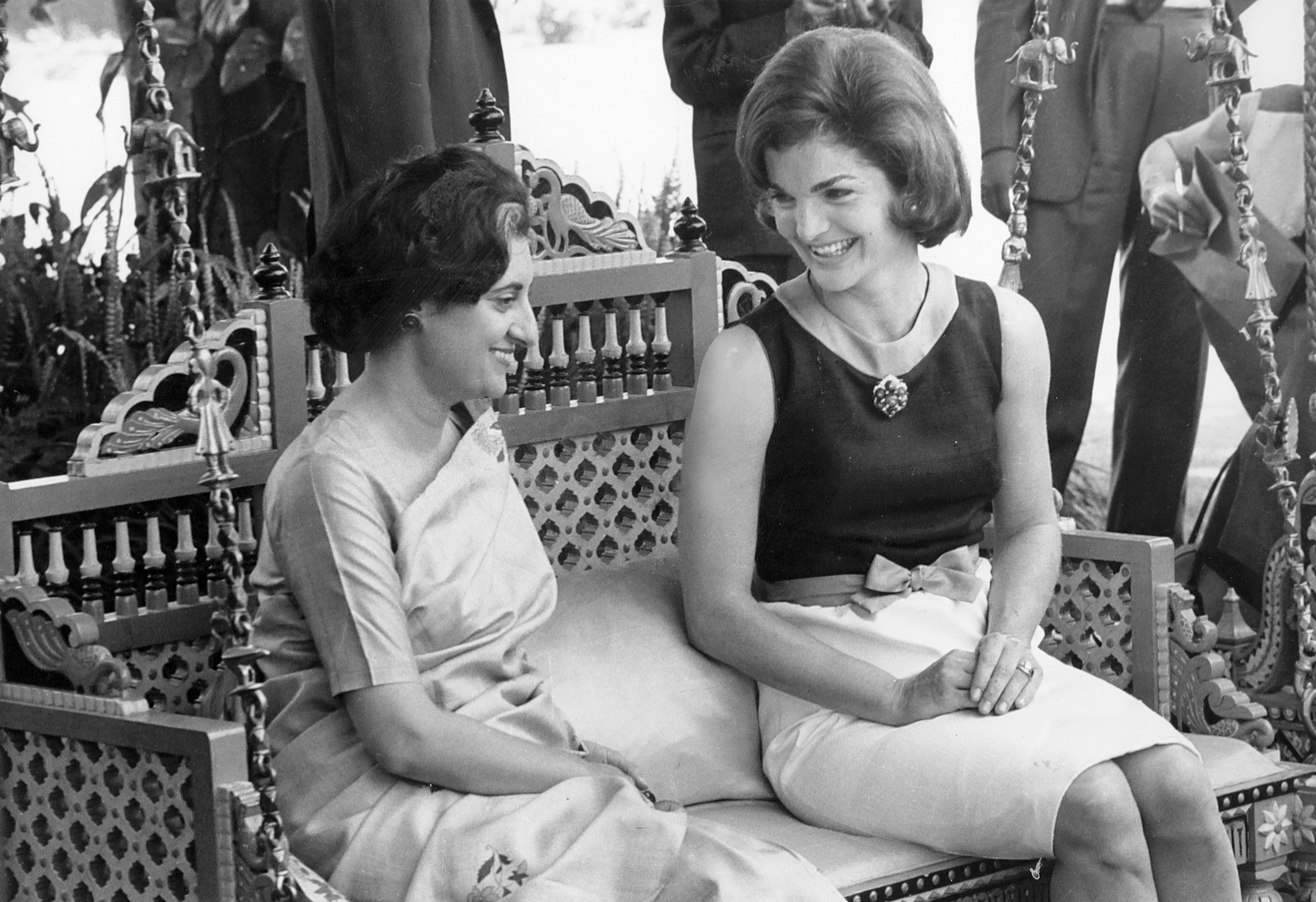
Kennedy and Indira Gandhi

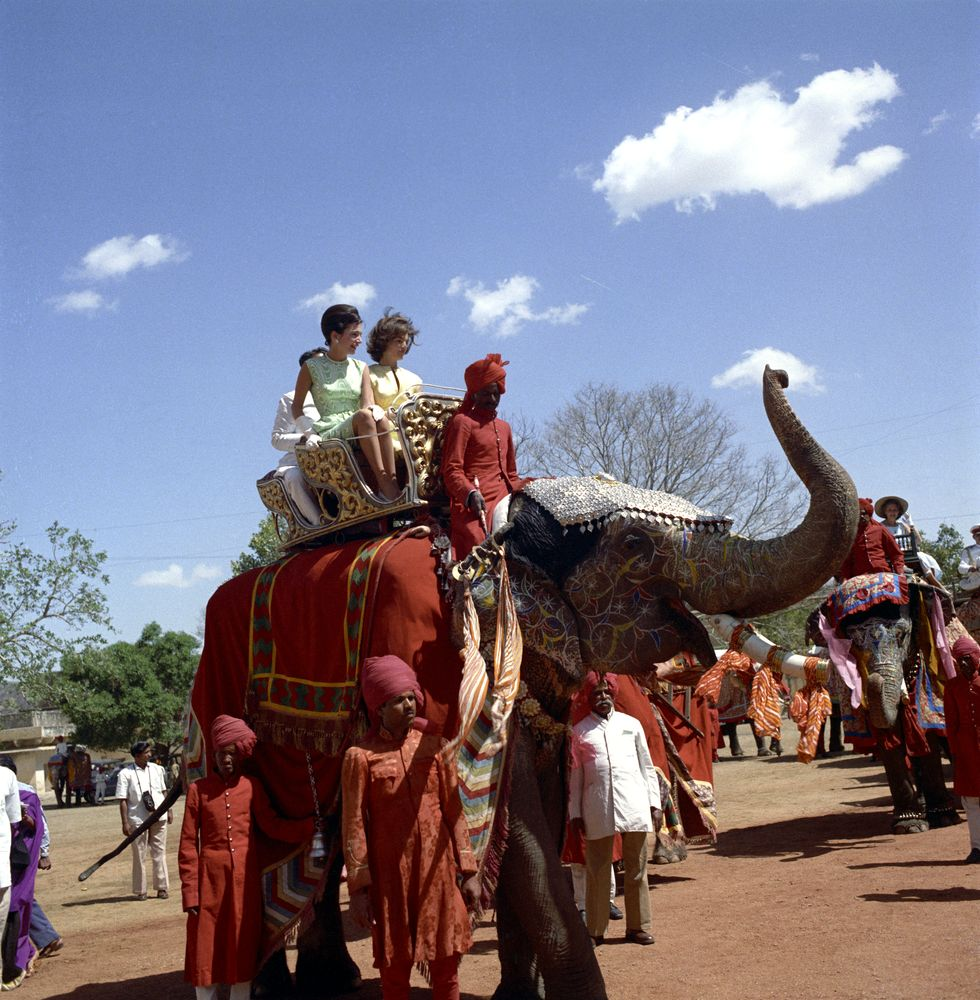
Kennedy rides an elephant in India

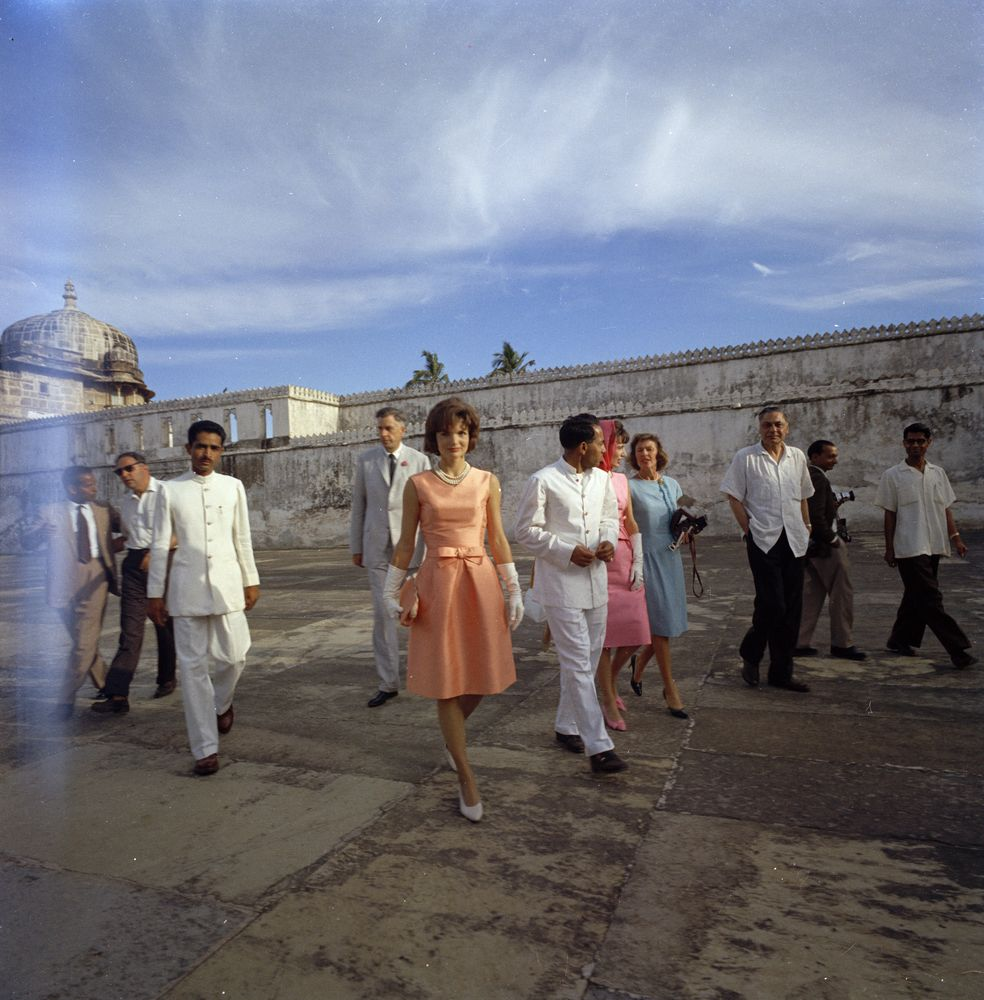
Kennedy at Lake Pichola, Udaipur

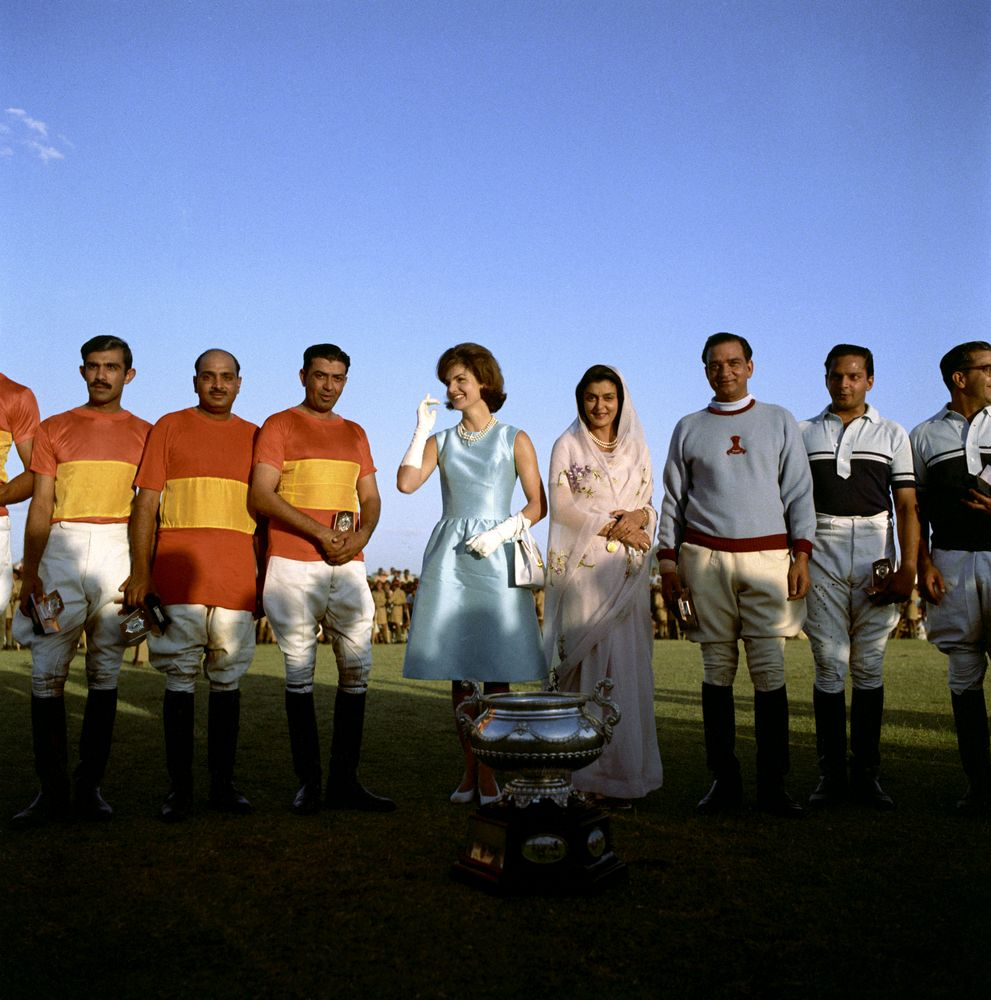
With Gayatri Devi and polo team in Jaipur

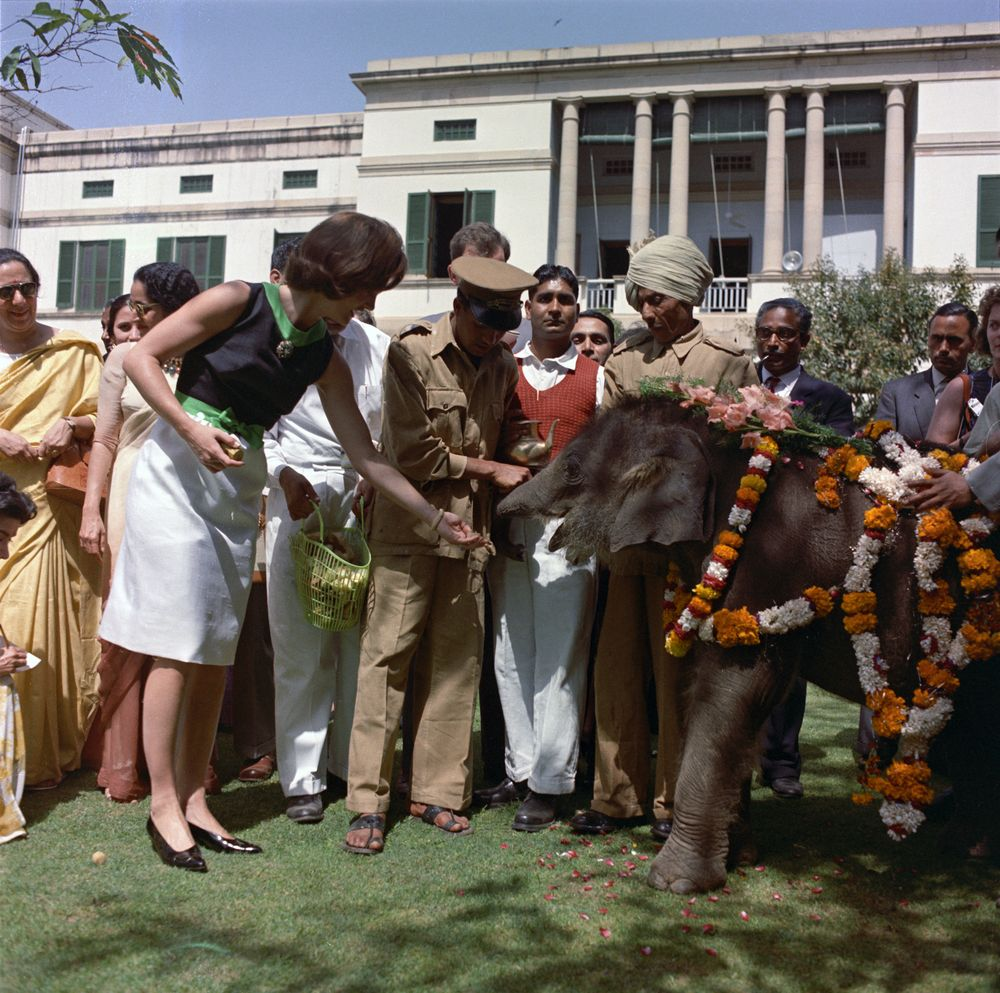
Kennedy feeds an elephant

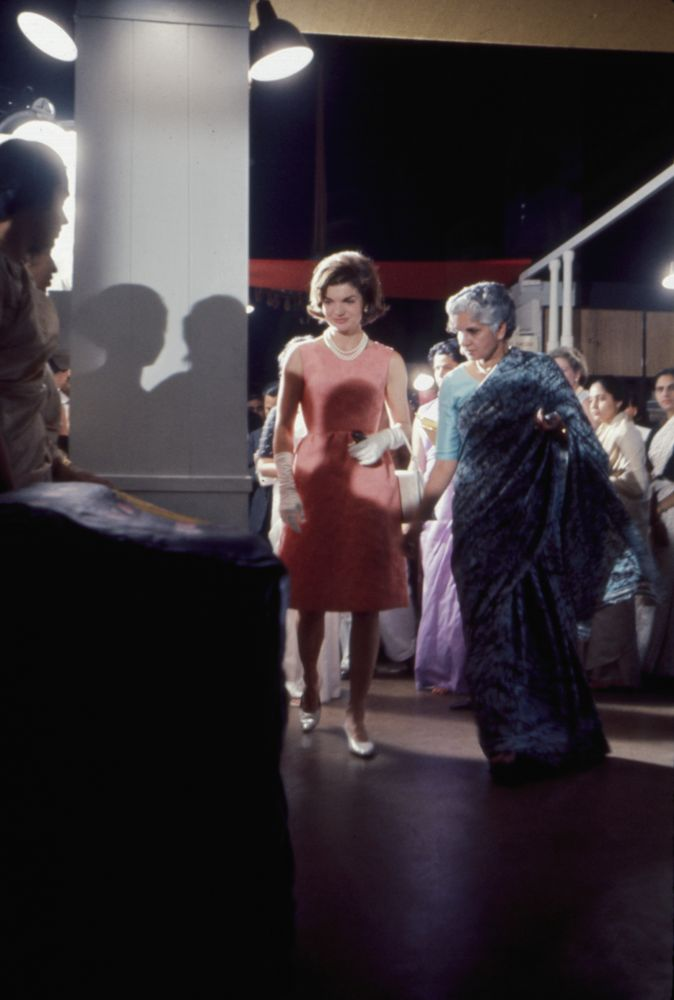
Kennedy with Prem Bery at the Cottage Industries Emporium

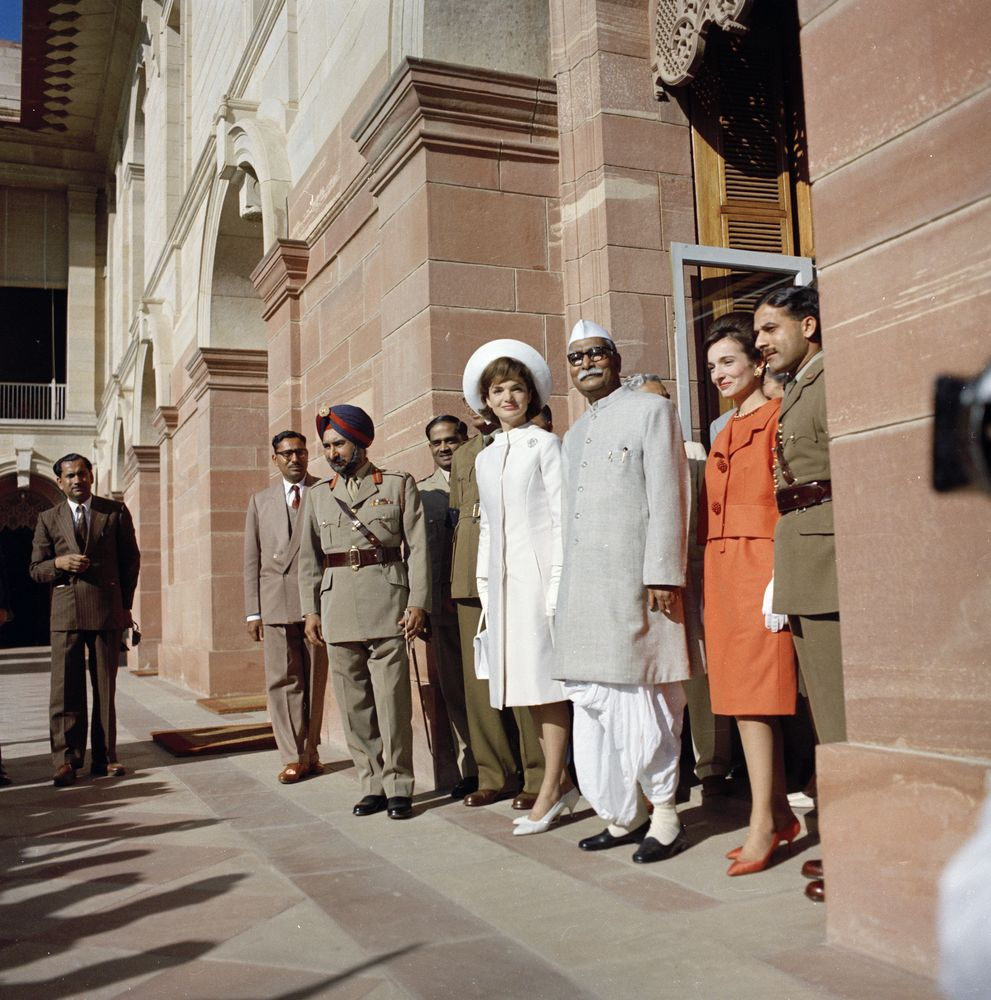
Kennedy with President Rajendra Prasad

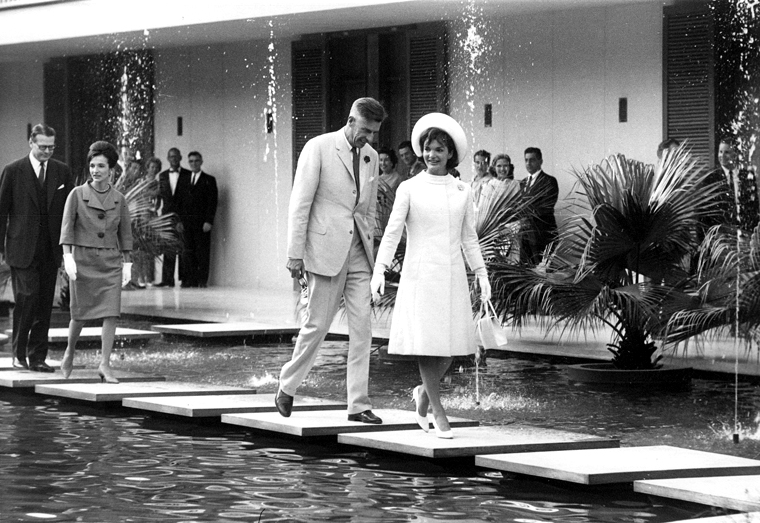
Galbraith and Kennedy at the U. S. Chancery, New Delhi

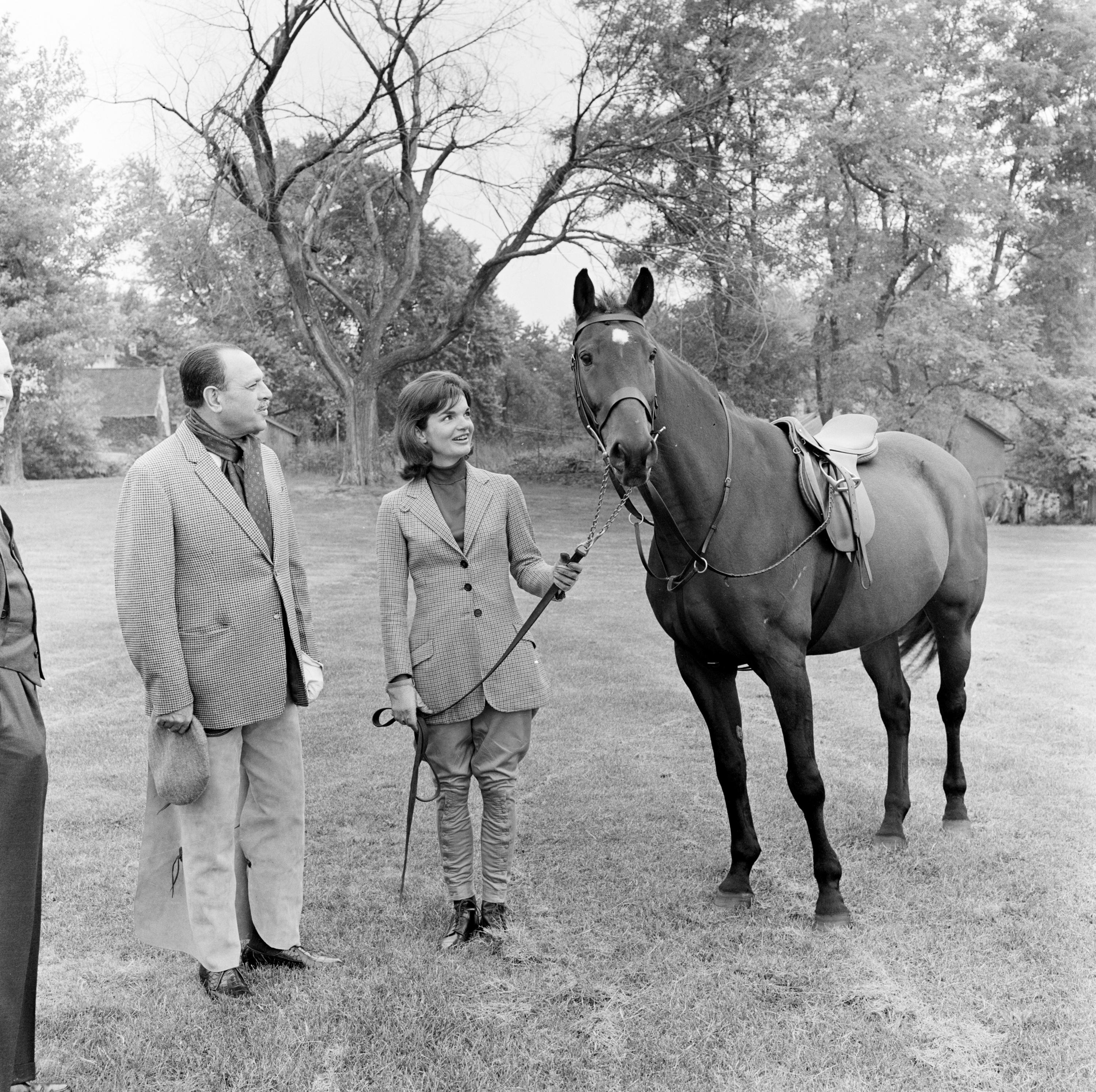
Kennedy with Khan and horse Sardar September 1962
