= The Gown of Destiny =

1917 film

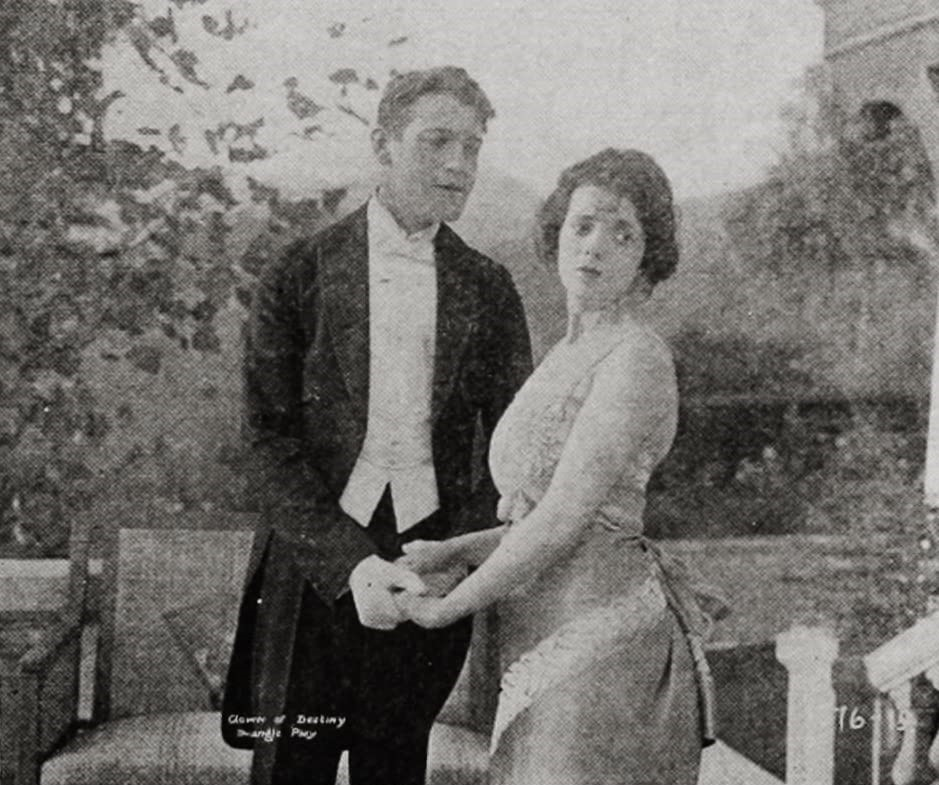
- Scene from The Gown of Destiny
- Directed by: Lynn Reynolds
- Written by: Earl Derr Biggers (story); Lynn Reynolds
- Produced by: Thomas H. Ince
- Starring: Alma Rubens; Herrera Tejedde; Allan Sears
- Cinematography: John W. Brown; William A. Reinhart
- Production company: Triangle Film Corporation
- Distributed by: Triangle Distributing
- Release date: November 30, 1917
- Running time: 50 minutes
- Country: United States
- Languages: Silent; English intertitles

The Gown of Destiny is a 1917 American silent drama film directed by Lynn Reynolds and starring Alma Rubens, Herrera Tejedde and Allan Sears. The film shows how a dress performs a patriotic function for France during World War One even though its designer is refused military service. Its wardrobe was designed by Peggy Hamilton and Hickson Inc. of New York's Fifth Avenue.

== Synopsis ==
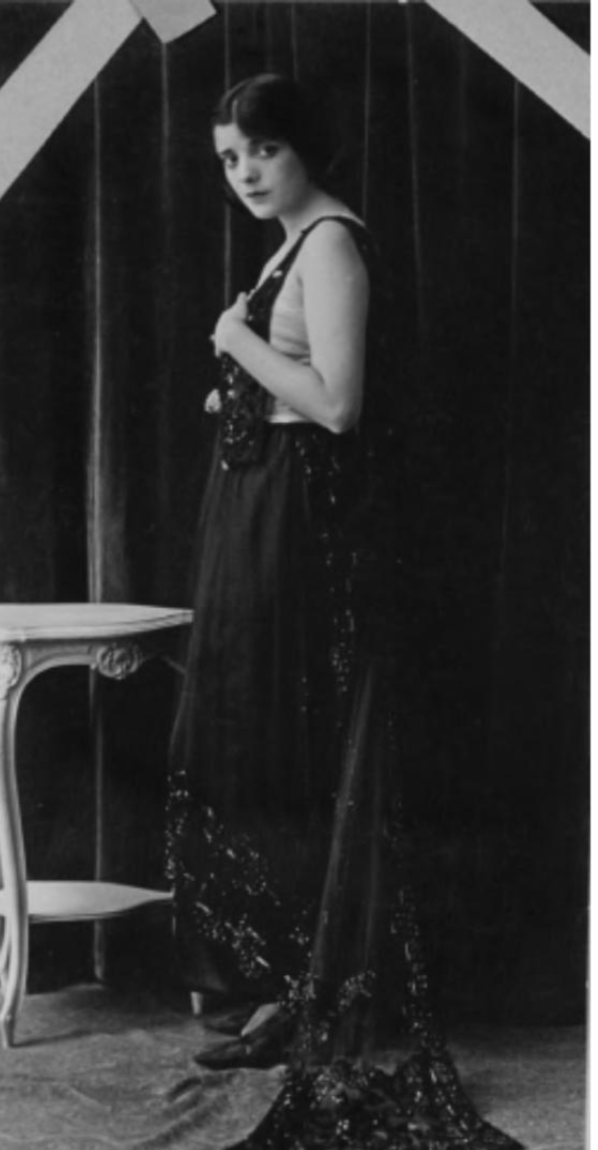
Alma Rubens in a Peggy Hamilton designed dress (1917)

During World War One, a fictional French dress designer in the United States, André Leriche, is refused service in the French army on the grounds that because of his effeminate profession he is not strong enough. He returns to his work and makes a sari-inspired dress that so impresses the unfaithful husband of the buyer Mrs Reyton that he returns to her. As a gift to his wife, Mr Reyton sends three ambulances to the front to help with the French war effort against the Germans, so the dress performs a patriotic function even though its maker cannot.

When Mrs Reyton gives the dress to her niece, it transforms her from a wallflower to a young woman so beautiful that a playboy falls in love with her and is so transformed that he joins the military and wins a medal when he saves Leriche's home town, and so his father, from the Germans. The dress, therefore, performs a further patriotic function.

== Cast ==
- Alma Rubens as Natalie Drew
- Herrera Tejedde as André Leriche
- Allan Sears as Neil Cunningham
- Lillian West as Mrs. Reyton
- J. Barney Sherry as Mr. Reyton
- Pietro Buzzi as Lucien Leriche
- Frederick Vroom as Sir John Cunningham
- Bliss Chevalier as Mme. Felice
- Gino Corrado Man in French Consulate office

== Preservation ==
A 35 mm print of The Gown of Destiny is held by George Eastman House.

== Bibliography ==
- Robert B. Connelly. The Silents: Silent Feature Films, 1910-36, Volume 40, Issue 2. December Press, 1998.
