= Howard Greer =

American fashion designer

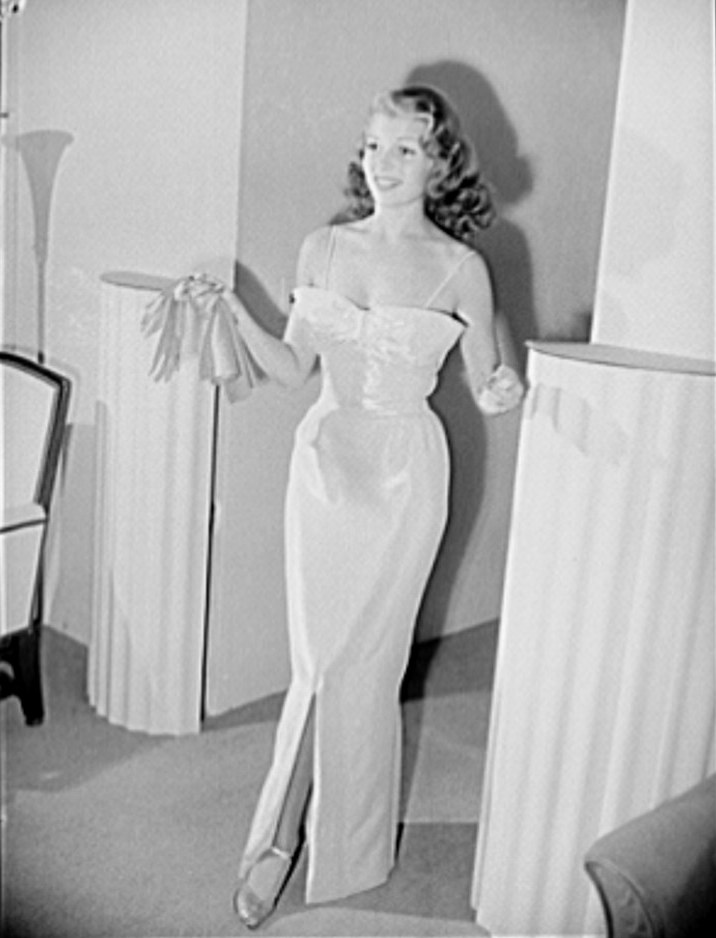
Actress Rita Hayworth models a pink and silver lamé evening gown designed by Howard Greer, 1941.

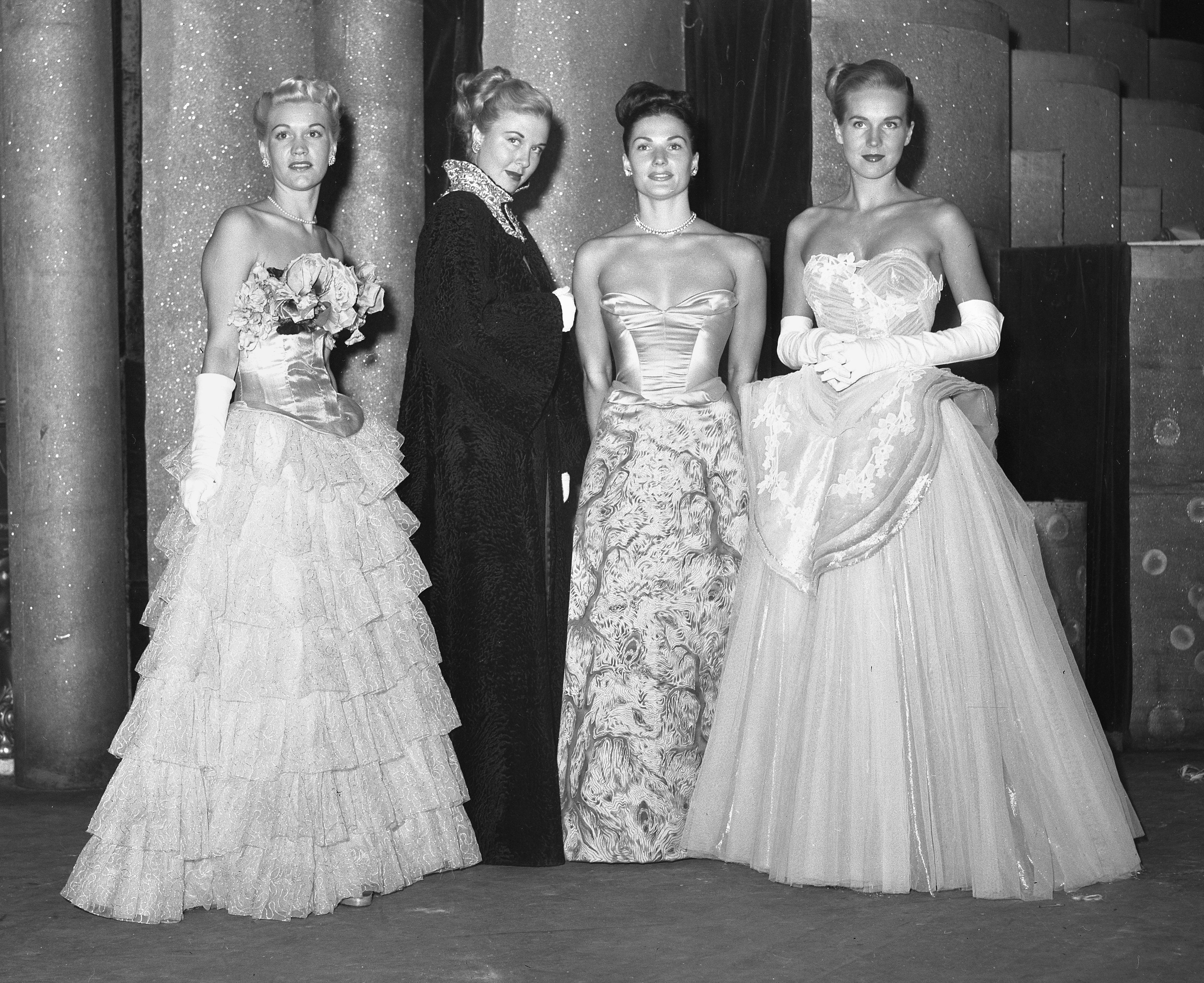
Evening gowns by Dorothy O'Hara, Orry-Kelly, Al Teitelbaum and Howard Greer, 1947.

Howard Greer (16 April 1896 – April 1974, in Los Angeles) was a Hollywood fashion designer and a costume designer in the Golden Age of American cinema.

Greer began his fashion career at Lucile in 1916, working in both her New York City and Chicago branches before serving in France in World War I. After the war, he remained in Europe, working for Lucille, Paul Poiret, and Molyneux, and designing for the theatre. He returned to America in 1921, and through his theatre work was hired as chief designer for Famous Players–Lasky studios, which was later to emerge from several reorganizations and mergers as Paramount Pictures.

Greer left his post at Paramount and opened his own couture operation in Hollywood in December 1927, where he designed custom clothing for the stars until his retirement in 1962. He also continued to create costumes for films into the 1950s, and designed mass-market clothing. Greer designed the wedding gowns of actress Bessie Love and socialite Gloria Vanderbilt.

His best-known film work includes the Katharine Hepburn films Christopher Strong (1933) and Bringing Up Baby (1938), and the gowns for 1940's My Favorite Wife.

Greer published an autobiography, Designing Male, in 1951.
