= Candy Jernigan =

American artist and designer

- Candy Jernigan watching a kathakali performance, c. 1983–1984
- Born: 1952; Miami, Florida, U.S.
- Died: June 5, 1991 (aged 39); New York City, New York, U.S.
- Other name: Cindy Jeroniga (Note: According to Alec Wilkinson, Cindy Jeroniga is a pseudonym Jernigan used often when working as an art director for an unnamed pornographic magazine in the early 1980s. Its earliest recorded use was in the first issue of Provincetown Magazine in 1977, of which she was also art director.)
- Education: Pratt Institute
- Occupations: Multimedia artist, illustrator, graphic designer, set designer
- Known for: Pot Crushed on Houston (1985), Found Dope (1986), Ten Kinds of Beans (1986), Sets of John Moran's The Manson Family (1990)
- Spouse: Philip Glass

Candy P. Jernigan (1952 – June 5, 1991) was an American multimedia artist, graphic designer, and set designer, instrumental in the avant-garde art scenes of Provincetown and New York City in the late 1970s and 1980s. She is best known for her vivid collages of found objects she described as "rejectamenta", presented in diagrams to absurd effect. Jernigan is also known for having designed the covers and jackets of dozens of music albums and books as a colleague of Paul Bacon.

== Biography ==
Born in Miami in 1952, Jernigan graduated from Miami Palmetto High School in 1969 before attending the Pratt Institute in Brooklyn, and first worked as a set and costume designer in Provincetown, Massachusetts before 1975. She was described by realist painter and friend Lisbeth Firmin as an influential figure in the town's arts scene, being extensively involved in its theatre and the Provincetown Art Association. Alec Wilkinson would describe her in a 1994 reflection on her time in Provincetown as witty, withdrawn, and modest in promoting her work. She kept a large macaw named Jack, and spent much of her evenings trying new studies of landscape painting and still lifes. Maintaining contact with Firmin and others who moved there, Jernigan moved back to New York in 1980, where she would take up work as a set designer for a dance company, and designed and illustrated dozens of covers for books and albums. She met Philip Glass in 1981 on a flight from Amsterdam to New York, and during their relationship would go on to design several of his album covers including The Photographer, Dance (Nos. 1-5), and In the Upper Room, among others. Within a few years she had moved in with Glass in his rowhouse in the East Village, helping to raise his children from his first marriage, Juliet and Zachary. Although identified as his third wife, the couple would spend the majority of their relationship as cohabitants, before marrying in 1991. Jernigan died the same year of liver cancer at the Memorial Sloan Kettering Cancer Center in New York City, following a prolonged period of illness, having only been correctly diagnosed within weeks of her death.

Following her death, a memorial fund for granting awards to dance choreographers and creators was set up in her name; her work would largely remain in storage in her Manhattan basement studio through the 1990s until the posthumous collection of her work Evidence: the Art of Candy Jernigan, was released in 1999. Sponsorship for performing arts projects, as well as exhibition of her work has been in recent years managed by The Candy Jernigan Foundation for the Arts, under Philip Glass's Aurora Music Foundation.

== Art career ==
Early sketch by Jernigan when she was art director of Provincetown Magazine for "beautifying" the Pilgrim Monument, along with her pseudonym "Cindy Jeroniga", 1977

While in Provincetown, Jernigan would serve as a set designer, and board member for the Provincetown Art Association and Museum and Provincetown Theater Company, as well as art director for Provincetown Magazine. One of the earliest exhibitions of her work was at the East End Gallery in 1977, operated by fellow artist Allegra Printz. Moving to New York city in 1980, Jernigan went to on establish herself as a book designer over the next decade of her career, working for noted book designer Paul Bacon, introduced to her by Laurie Dolphin.

In her own artwork Jernigan would work with several different mediums, including watercolors, oil painting, pastels, and mixed media such as Xerox art. A contributing member of the International Society of Copier Artists, her work was featured in multiple issues of its quarterly, including its first "bookworks" edition, an annual issue made up of separate booklets by different artists. Among her most notable works in mixed media were her "trash archivist" works, with several comprising New York City garbage including wrappers, packaging, and drug paraphernalia such as needles, vials, and caps. Jernigan would dub such objects "rejectaments" or "rejectamenta", items which have lost purpose or are disposable, with her work described contemporarily by a reporter for The Morning Call as "a glorification of the insignificant... rather to serve as evidence of our being. [Jernigan] creates unwanted relics of a society that wishes to be remembered on a much grander scale and not in the ordinary sense of its most basic ideas." These found object works include Found Dope, Found Dope II, and Box O' Roaches, the latter being several of the insects mounted on velvet, in a 1989 New York Magazine interview, Jernigan would characterize the piece– "I wanted them to look regal". Another example of the use of bugs in her work was her 1985 piece, Dead Bug Book; upon returning to her and Glass's summer cottage in Cape Breton, Jernigan found the house to be overrun with bug corpses, and rather than throwing them out took the time to collect and draw them for her work.

Following her diagnosis with liver cancer, she spent her last weeks developing a seldom-exhibited series of works on paper, called Vessels, creating more than 80 watercolor paintings in a span of 2 weeks. The series, features Greco-Roman vases and other simpler containers placed on colorful stages expressing different tones and characteristics about the spaces the objects occupied.

Candy Jernigan's work has been featured in the Dance Theater Workshop in 1985 and 1989, at the Bronx Museum and Lumen Travo in 1987, and posthumously in McSweeney's Quarterly Concern, Provincetown Art Association and Museum in 2002, and at the Greene Naftali Gallery in 2014. Her work is included in the permanent collections of the Whitney Museum of American Art and the Museum of Contemporary Art, Chicago.

== Selected works ==
=== Book jacket designs ===
- Corrigan, by Lady Caroline Blackwood, Viking (1985), first American edition
- A Darker Shade of Pale: a Backdrop to Bob Dylan, by Wilfrid Mellers, Oxford University Press (1985), first American edition
- Rich Like Us, by Nayantara Sahgal, Heinemann (1985), first American edition
- Moonshine, by Alec Wilkinson, Knopf (1985)
- In the Moment, by Francis Davis, Oxford University Press (1986)
- Robak's Fire, by Joe L. Hensley, Doubleday (1986)
- Horror Wears Blue, by Lin Carter, Doubleday (1987)
- Vergil in Averno, by Avram Davidson, Doubleday (1987)
- Roots of Honor, by Shelly Gross, Donald I. Fine (1987)
- The Nine Bright Shiners, by Anthea Fraser, Doubleday (1988)
- Memory of Snow and of Dust, by Breyten Breytenbach, Farrar Straus Giroux (1989), first American edition
- King Edward VIII by Philip Ziegler, Knopf (1991), first American edition
- Sheep, Goats and Soap, by John Malcolm, C. Scribner & Sons (1991)
- A Tasty Way to Die, by Janet Laurence, Doubleday (1991), first American edition
- A Journal of the Flood Year, by David Ely, Donald I. Fine (1992), posthumous release

=== Album covers ===
- The Photographer, Philip Glass (1984)
- Formal Abandon, Michael Riesman (1986)
- Dance (nos. 1-5), Philip Glass (1988)
- Music in Twelve Parts, Philip Glass (1988)
- Passages, Ravi Shankar and Philip Glass (1990)

=== Compilations and books ===
- Please Save My World: Children Speak Out Against Nuclear War (1984) OCLC 11030523, illustrator
- Dead Bug Book (1985) OCLC 52783499 (Note: Posthumously published as The Dead Bug Box : 24 postal cards (1999) by Chronicle Books)
- Pop Tops of the Modern World (1985), 6 piece folio, limited printing
- 9 (nine) Unknown Landscapes (1986) OCLC 81664634
- Evidence : the Art of Candy Jernigan (1999) OCLC 40668064, posthumous compilation

=== Set design and visuals ===
- "Snapshots," debut by Ralph Fredericks, directed by Grant King, Provincetown Theater Company, 1978 (set design of cast portraits by Jernigan & Lisbeth Firmin)
- "The Richest Girl in the World Finds Happiness", directed by Charles Horne and James Bennett, Provincetown Theater Company, 1979
- "Happy Birthday, Wanda June", directed by Ron Weissenberger, Provincetown Theater Company, 1979
- "State of the Heart", by Cyndi Lee, 1983 (Note: Film of production in collections of New York Public Library)
- "This Statement Is False (The Liar's Paradox)", by Mary Ellen Strom, 1988
- "Nuts: (homage to Freud)", by Cyndi Lee, 1989, sets and costume design
- "The Manson Family: An Opera", by John Moran, 1990
