= Night Flight (TV series) =

American variety television program

- Night Flight title screen from 1988
- Created by: Stuart S. Shapiro
- Written by: Stuart Samuels
- Directed by: Stuart S. Shapiro
- Narrated by: Pat Prescott
- Country of origin: United States

Production
- Executive producer: Jeff Franklin
- Producers: Eric Trigg; Stuart S. Shapiro; Cynthia Friedland
- Camera setup: Multi-camera
- Running time: 4 hours

Original release
- Network: USA Network
- Release: June 5, 1981 – December 30, 1988
- Network: Syndication
- Release: 1990 – 1996
- Network: IFC
- Release: February 14, 2018 – present

Night Flight is an eclectic variety television show that originated on cable TV network USA Network.

It originally aired from 1981 to 1988 before moving to syndication in the early 1990s, and relaunched strictly online in 2015 with original episodes that can be streamed on the subscription channel Night Flight Plus. In April 2018, the series returned to cable television as a short form (15-minute) program airing late Friday nights/early Saturday mornings on the network IFC.

Night Flight includes a mix of music videos from mainstream and more obscure artists, artist interviews, B movies, documentaries, short films, stand-up comedy and animation.

== History ==
Jeff Franklin (head of American Talent International) and Stuart S. Shapiro (head of International Harmony) approached USA Network about developing Night Flight in February 1981.

A new series that defied conventional formats and easy categorization was an acceptable risk to USA, and it aired the first episode of Night Flight on June 5, 1981. The timing was a deliberate move to exploit the 1981 Writers Guild of America strike, which had halted production on NBC's highly popular program Saturday Night Live.

Episodes originally lasted four hours each, and aired in the late-night programming block after 11:00 PM Eastern Time on Friday and Saturday nights. The final original broadcast of Night Flight aired December 30, 1988; it was replaced with the programs Camp Midnite and USA Up All Night starring Gilbert Gottfried, starting the following week.

In 1990, Night Flight was revived in syndication. New episodes were produced for three seasons until 1992, when the program reverted to selected reruns of episodes from the USA Network years hosted by Tom Juarez. These “best of” shows were aired as late as 1996.

In 2015, the series found a new life on NightFlight.com. In addition to the original series, it features new short and feature films, as well as curated YouTube and Vimeo clips. A subscription service called Night Flight Plus launched in March 2016 which allows viewers to pay a monthly or annual fee for access to full segments of the show.

In 2018, a new Night Flight program began airing on IFC as a 15-minute series. It mixes highlights from the original series with surreal footage taken from films, television and the Internet.

== Format ==
Night Flight was one of the first sources in American television to see full-length and short films not generally aired on network television, or even pay-cable TV channels such as HBO. It was the first place that many Americans were able to see music documentaries such as Another State of Mind, The Grateful Dead Movie, Word, Sound and Power and Yessongs. Night Flight was also one of the first American television shows to present the music video as a serious visual art form rather than a mere promotional tool for musicians. Late-night broadcasts also afforded cable television the freedom to air portions of videos that MTV and other outlets had either censored or banned.

There was no on-camera host in the original series. Pat Prescott introduced segments with a voiceover just before they began. Recurring segments included:

- Take Off - A segment that grouped together music videos based on a single unifying theme, and added a mix of interviews and snippets from movies to help round out the segment. Examples from the show are Take Off To Animation, Take Off To Sex, Take Off To Violence, etc. San Francisco-based production company VideoWest produced the segment from 1981 to 1983, with news reporter Dave McQueen doing the voice-overs. From 1983 on, Night Flight's producers (ATI Video) were in charge of producing the segment with Prescott narrating.
- New Wave Theatre - Hosted by Peter Ivers, the show featured punk and New Wave acts, chiefly from the Los Angeles area.
- The Video Artist - A segment covering artists working in the then-new world of video and computer graphics.
- The Comic - Profiles of various comedians, consisting of stand-up bits interspersed with interview segments. This segment was also known as Night Flight's Comedy Cuts toward the end of the show's run.
- Video Profile - A segment featuring videos by one particular band or artist. Works included Suspicious Circumstances, by Jim Blashfield, "Metal Dogs of India" and "Machine Song" by Chel White, and works by the Brothers Quay.
- Atomic TV - A segment featuring various Cold War-era footage
- Love That Bob (Church of the Sub-Genius) - A serialized presentation of the Sub-Genius video Arise!
- Rick Shaw's Takeout Theater - '70s era martial arts movies presented by comedian Frankie Pace
- Dynaman - An English-dubbed parody of six episodes of the Super Sentai series Kagaku Sentai Dynaman
- Space Patrol - An early 1950s American sci-fi television series
- Tales of Tomorrow - An early 1950s American sci-fi anthology television series
- Heavy Metal Heroes
- The Some Bizzare Show, featuring the artists of the Some Bizzare Records label
- Snub TV alternative music program, first two seasons produced in the UK.

Bela Lugosi's Monogram films were recurring features. Other segments included condensed parodies of low-quality, out-of-copyright black-and-white-era movies and serial, as well as letters from viewers.

== Show development ==
Night Flight's Director of Programming, Stuart Samuels, was a former professor of History at the University of Pennsylvania who also taught seminars at the annual Cannes Film Festival. He also authored a book on cult films, Midnight Movies.

In an interview in issue #77 of Boston Rock, Samuels said the concept of airing films centered around a single theme was intended to have the effect that "the videos were saying something to each other and were letting the audience make conclusions from them." Samuels also said the show was never trying to compete with MTV; he felt the content of Night Flight was "...a little more selective... intelligent and... stimulating."

Samuels said Night Flight was the first show to place director's names on the videos, interview the bands, create band profiles, air uncensored videos, and to air longform 12" remix videos. He said they were also the first music video show to employ political themes, such as apartheid. The intent, he said, was not to be "...heavy-handed, but do 'here's-something-that's-in-the-news' shows".

The eventual backlash against the repetition of rock videos inspired Night Flight to program even more public domain animation (especially those from the Fleischer Studios, Ub Iwerks, etc.), cult and camp films in the mid- to late 1980s into the early 1990s. The show was thus instrumental in the distribution of cult, midnight movie and campy films.

== List of selected films shown on Night Flight ==
Sources:

- American Tickler
- An American Werewolf in London
- Blank Generation
- Andy Warhol's Dracula
- Andy Warhol's Frankenstein
- Another State of Mind
- Anti-Clock
- Assassin of Youth
- Bambi Meets Godzilla
- Barbarella
- Behind Locked Doors
- Bluebeard
- The Brain
- Breaking Glass
- Charters to Hell
- Cocaine Fiends
- Consenting Adult
- Countryman
- Damaged Lives
- Daughters of Darkness
- Dementia 13
- Demonoid
- Destination Big House
- Eating Raoul
- Fantastic Animation Festival (one of the earliest NF episodes)
- Fantastic Planet
- Forbidden Zone (clips only)
- Go, Johnny, Go!
- The Grateful Dead Movie
- Hitler - Dead or Alive
- I Was a Zombie for the F.B.I.
- J-Men Forever
- Juvenile Jungle
- Killers from Space
- Lenny Bruce Without Tears
- Ladies and Gentlemen, The Fabulous Stains
- Magical Mystery Tour
- The Mask of Diijon
- Medium Cool
- Mister Rock and Roll
- The Music of the Spheres
- On the Air Live with Captain Midnight
- The Phantom Creeps
- Polyester (film)
- Princes of Cocaine
- Quasi at the Quackadero
- The Red House
- Reefer Madness
- Reggae Sunsplash
- Ricochet
- Rock & Rule (clips only)
- Rock, Rock, Rock!
- The Rocky Horror Picture Show (clips only)
- Rude Boy
- Rust Never Sleeps
- Scared to Death
- Sex Madness
- Smithereens
- Sold American
- Spooks Run Wild
- The Terror
- The Terror of Tiny Town
- The Doors Are Open
- Things to Come
- Trial Without Jury
- Tunnel Vision
- Union City
- Urgh! A Music War
- Wild Style
- The Wizard of Waukeshaw
- Word, Sound and Power
- The Yellow Rose of Texas
- Yessongs
- Young and Wild

== List of selected films shown on Rick Shaw's Takeout Theater on Night Flight ==
- Black List
- Fury of King Boxer
- Island Warriors aka The Country of Beauties aka Warrior Women
- Kung Fu of 8 Drunkards
- Shanghai Massacre
- Young Hero

== Reception and legacy ==
TV Guide called Night Flight the "Best Pop Music Magazine show on cable". USA Today would later echo that sentiment, declaring it "the most creative use of music and video on television today".

== See also ==
- USA Up All Night
