= Zoom-Zoom-Zoom =

"Zum zum zum"

Song by Jibril Serapis Bey

from the album Only The Strong
- Language: Brazilian Portuguese
- Genre: Capoeira
- Length: 2:53
- Songwriter: Kao Rossman

"Zoom-Zoom-Zoom" (also known as "Zum Zum Zum" or "Zoom Zoom") is the title of a capoeira song, made popular by the 1993 movie, Only The Strong, for whose soundtrack the song was recorded by Jibril Serapis Bey and written by Kao Rossman. It is one of three Serapis Bey recordings which appear on the soundtrack to the film.

The song is not related to "Zoom Zoom Zoom," a 1958 doo-wop single by The Collegians.
