= Before Freedom: Nehru's Letters to His Sister 1909–1947 =

Collection of letters written by Jawaharlal Nehru

- Author: Jawaharlal Nehru, compiled and edited by Nayantara Sahgal
- Language: English
- Genre: Collected letters
- Publisher: 1st edition by Harper Collins Publishers, 2nd edition by Roli Books
- Publication date: 2000, 2004
- Publication place: India
- Pages: 400
- ISBN: 81-7436-347-5

Before Freedom: Nehru's Letters to His Sister 1909–1947 is a collection of letters written by Jawaharlal Nehru between 1909 and 1947, to his sister Vijaya Lakshmi Pandit, affectionately referred to as Nan. The collection was edited and compiled by his niece, Nayantara Sahgal, and was first published in 2000 by HarperCollins. A later edition with an additional letter by Nehru to his sister following the death of her husband Ranjit Sitaram Pandit, was published in 2004 by Roli Books.

The letters cover the 38 years before Indian independence, giving a first-hand account of the thoughts, activities and struggles of India's first prime minister. Sahgal, in addition, gives an introduction to each of the seven parts, giving a political context in addition to a personal one.

The book also contains a few selected letters from Pandit, her husband Ranjit, her father Motilal Nehru and Indira Gandhi's husband, Feroze Gandhi.

== Background ==
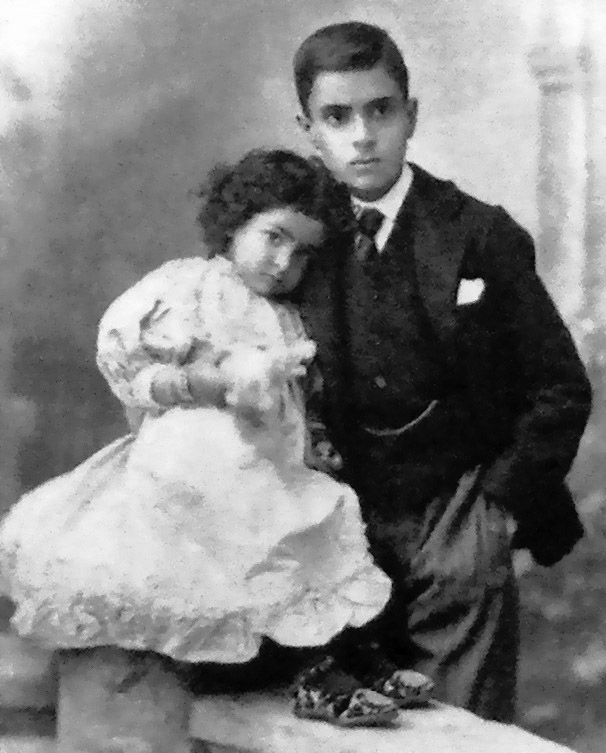
Pandit and Nehru, Anand Bhawan, Allahabad

Over the course of over 35 years, Nehru wrote regularly to his sister Vijaya Lakshmi Pandit, born Sarup Kumari Nehru and affectionately called Nan. She was eleven years junior to him. The letters disclose historical details of India's freedom movement through the eyes of its first prime minister, in addition to his personal family struggles. The author and editor, Nayantara Sahgal is the daughter of Pandit, niece of Nehru and first cousin of Indira Gandhi. She writes that "of all the words written about Nehru, none reveal him as his own do". His letters to his mother, father and youngest sister, Krishna Nehru Hutheesing (Betty), were previously published.

In 1963, Nehru's youngest sister had also published a compilation of his letters to her older sister, Pandit, in a book titled Nehru's Letters to his Sister, of which one review in the journal International Affairs described Nehru as "a dreamer amongst politicians" and having "a peculiar mixture of sentimentality and idealism in his personality".

In his autobiography, Nehru recalled 18 August 1900, the day Pandit was born, and how he "had long nourished a secret grievance at not having brothers or sisters when everyone else seemed to have had them, and the prospect of having a baby brother or sister all to myself was exhilarating". Sahgal recounts in the book's introduction that her mother loved two men; her brother Jawaharlal and her husband, Ranjit.

== Publication ==
This collection of letters, Before Freedom: Nehru's letters to his sister 1909–1947, written by Jawaharlal Nehru between 1909 and 1947 to his sister, was edited and compiled by his niece, Nayantara Sahgal, and was first published in 2000 by HarperCollins. A later edition was published by Roli Books in 2004.

In the same year (2004), an edition of Nehru's letters to his daughter Indira Priyadarshini (later Indira Gandhi), was also published.

== Content ==
The book is divided into seven parts, revealing Nehru's letters in a chronological order from 1909 to 1947, and one letter from 1956, witnessing his changing role from husband to father and then statesman. The 2004 edition contains an additional letter by Nehru to his sister following the death of her husband, Ranjit Sitaram Pandit. Images of Pandit and her husband, Ranjit are also included.

At the beginning of each of the seven parts, Sahgal gives an introduction, with personal comments and a political context. Sahgal uses the term "Europe-as-centre thesis" to describe the era in which the letters were written. She states in the introduction that "Nehru implacably opposed the Raj, yet"..."was conscious of what he owed to the best that was British". She includes five letters from Pandit to Nehru and two from Nehru to Ranjit.

=== Part one: 1909–1912 ===
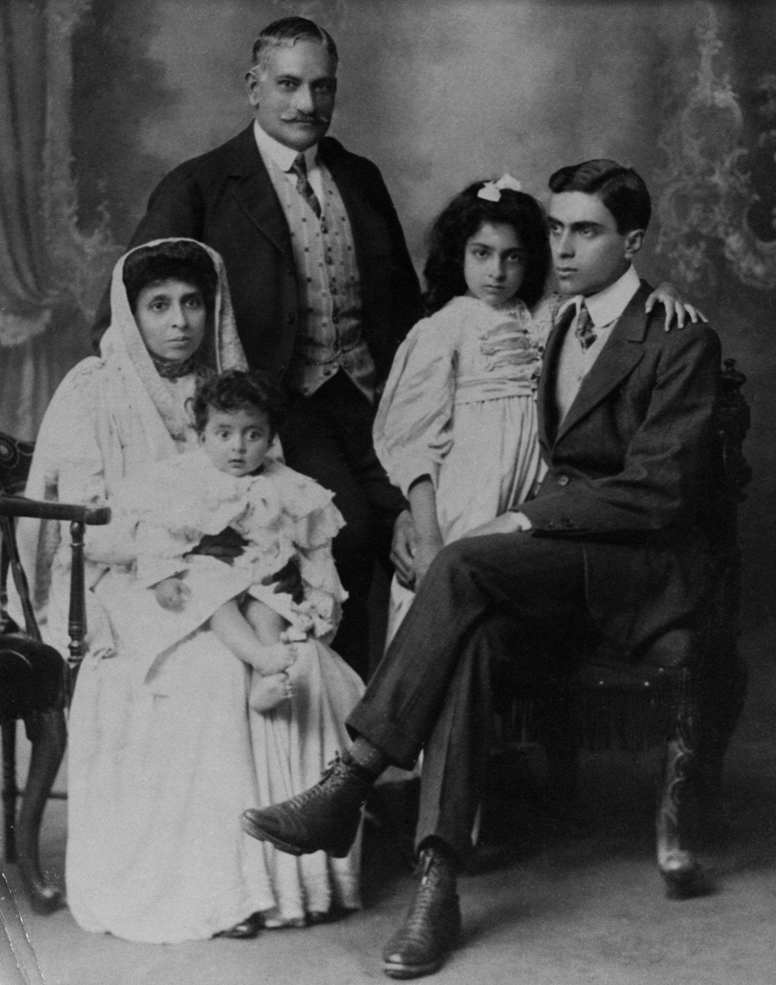
Motilal Nehru visited England to meet his son who was studying at Cambridge. From left: Krishna Kumari, Swarup Rani (Vijay Lakshmi), Motilal Nehru, Sarup Kumari (Vijaya Lakshmi Pandit), Jawaharlal Nehru

The letters begin shortly after Nehru arrived in England to attend school and when Pandit was four years old. Early postcards were faded and difficult to interpret, but the correspondence continued through to Nehru taking his tripos degree from Trinity College, University of Cambridge, in 1910 and being called to the bar in 1912, following which he returned home to Allahabad.

The first letter dated 2 July 1909, begins with "my dear Nanie", the name he referred to before the English governess changed it to "Nan". He continues with "I am sending you a little teddy bear"...and..."a paintbox". Later he sends her books. His letters include mentions of his visits to Scotland, Liverpool, Eastbourne, "a sweet little place" called Crowborough and a visit to watch a pantomime in Drury Lane.

=== Part two: 1926–1927 ===
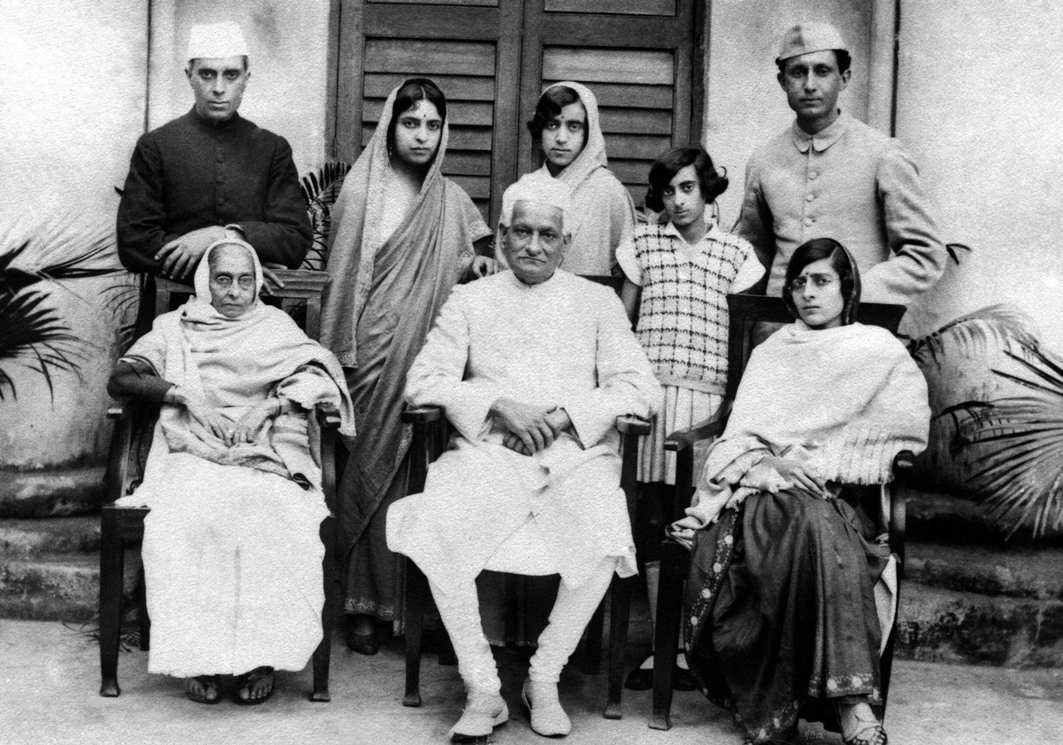
Nehru family group photo, 1927

Part two begins with a letter from Pandit to Nehru dated 17 May 1921, a week after her near lavish wedding to Ranjit and was addressed from Calcutta. She tells Nehru that she is happy, but often lonely as Ranjit spends the day at work. Sahgal adds the backdrop and the change of scene at the Nehru family home, Anand Bhawan. In 1920, Gandhi had become the leader of the Indian National Congress with a dual plan of non-cooperation with the British and a fight against Indian "social evils" starting with untouchability. In the same year, he had stayed at the Nehru home with the resulting influence on Motilal Nehru. Both Nehru and his father, Motilal, gave up their legal practices to take up Gandhi's promise of "the fullest protection of one's self-respect and honour though it might mean the loss of possessions and properties". An extract from a letter from Motilal to Pandit, dated 6 October 1920 is included, stating his intention to devote himself to "non-cooperation".

Nehru's travels to Europe from the 1920s, in the hope of a cure for his wife Kamala Nehru's tuberculosis, and his continuing concern for Indira's education and upbringing, fuelled much of the content of his letters to his sister during this time. Kamala suffered her first long illness in 1925, and in 1926, they both, with Pandit and her husband Ranjit, sailed for Europe. Most of the letters between Nehru and Pandit during this time, were written in Europe. Images of Europe recur in the letters, such as Milan Cathedral, the fascists in Italy and skiing in Switzerland.

=== Part three: 1931–1936 ===
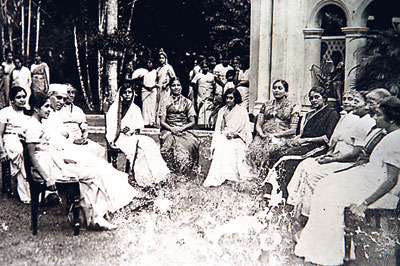
The Nehru family in Sri Lanka in 1932

1929 witnessed the Declaration of Independence and the following year saw the launch of civil disobedience with the Salt March of March–April 1930. On the same day that Gandhi picked up salt from the sea at Dandi, Nehru's father Motilal Nehru gifted their family home, Anand Bhawan, to the Congress Party, which the British declared as an unlawful organisation. Along with others, both Nehrus were subsequently imprisoned. The first letter in part three is one from Pandit to her brother, on 13 September 1931, providing a first hand political context to the letters in this section. Just shy of five months later, Pandit, who was now the Congress Party's joint secretary with Lal Bahadur Shastri was also arrested and imprisoned.

Nehru continued to write while he was imprisoned in India during the India's independence movement. In 1933, he writes to Pandit from Dehradun Jail, of his concerns regarding the ambitions of his daughter Indira (whom he also called Indu), questioning her future aspirations and "meant to draw her down from the clouds". When he received no reply, he became "quite clear that nothing that is worthwhile can be done in the clouds! She will have to come down and if she does not do so early she will do so late and then the process is more painful". He adds "Indu, I feel, is extraordinarily imaginative and self-centred or subjective. Indeed I would say that, quite unconsciously, she has grown remarkably selfish".

=== Part four: 1937–1940 ===
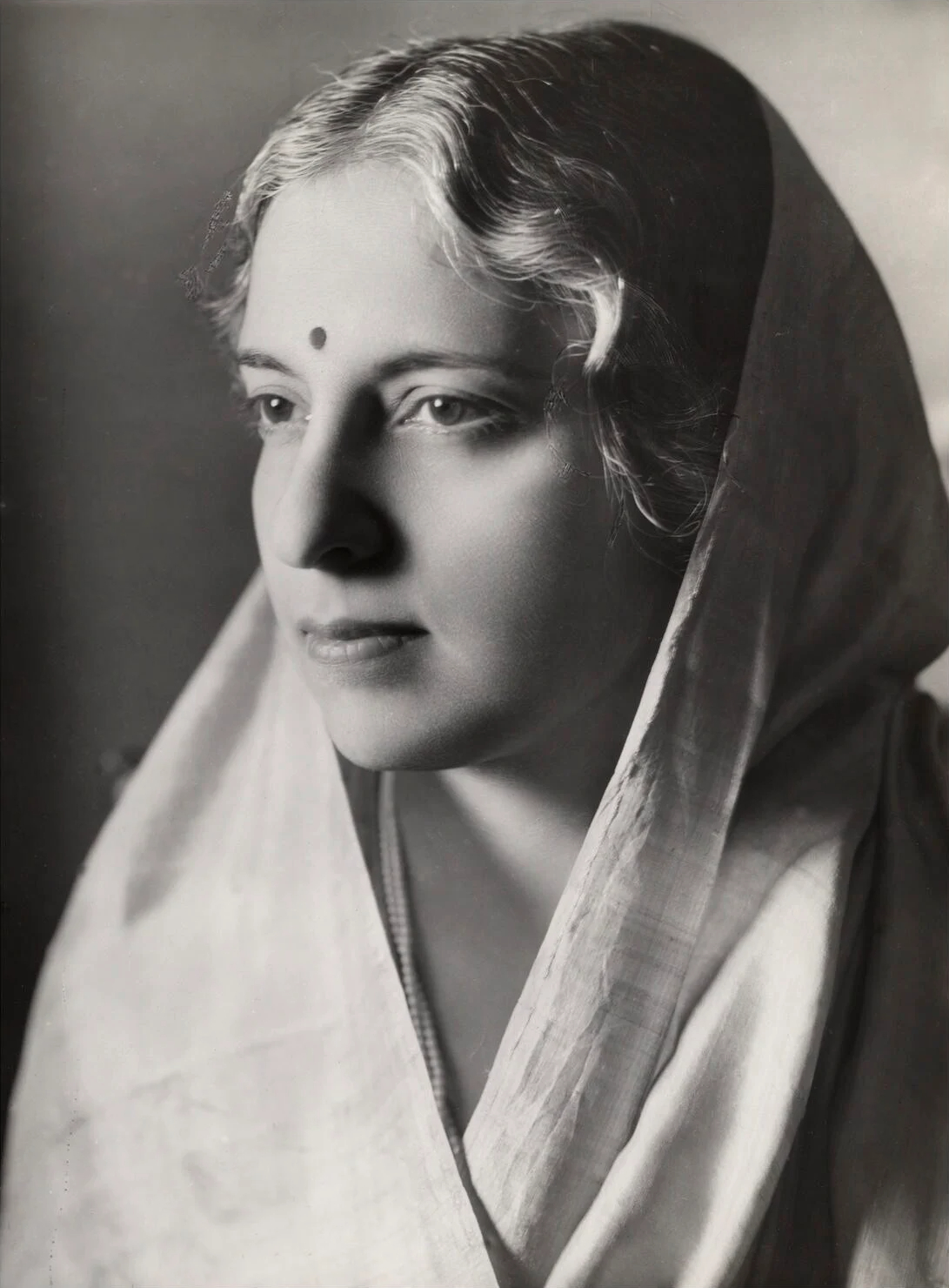
Vijaya Lakshmi Pandit (1938)'

Motilal Nehru died in 1931 and Kamala in 1936. With the added departure of Indira leaving Allahabad to attend school abroad, Nehru felt that his home Anand Bhawan had become "desolate". He had already tried to persuade Pandit in a letter dated 15 March 1935 that "it would be a good thing if sometime in the future you and Ranjit and the children would live there [Anand Bhawan]", and they subsequently did.

Happenings at home and the changing political scene with the Government of India Act 1935, also shaped the letters of part four. In addition, correspondence between Nehru and Pandit during their trips to Europe in 1938 reveal the atmosphere of pre-Second World War Europe. On 18 August 1938, Nehru writes to Ranjit from Prague, stating that "the air is full of rumours of war here". An unwell Pandit, who was seeking treatment in London, visited Prague via invitation from the Czechoslovakia health minister at the time Sudetenland became occupied by Hitler's army, and both Nehru and Pandit were present amongst the crowd outside 10 Downing Street on 30 September 1938, at Neville Chamberlain's announcement of "peace for our time".

In addition to letters between Nehru and Pandit, one letter from Feroze Gandhi to Pandit, dated 8 November 1938 just prior to her departure from London, is presented in part four and includes an apology of his "past actions", as well as disclosing his love for Indira.

=== Part five: November 1941 – December 1943 ===
In 1940, Nehru was sentenced to four years imprisonment. In his letter dated 21 March 1943, a year after Indira's marriage to Feroze, and writing from Ahmednagar Fort, he voices concerns to Pandit, that he has not been receiving all his mail, a number of his letters have not had a response, "a grave domestic matter has worried" him and the absence of news of Indira. He describes the company he has in prison. Having been imprisoned at least eight or nine times before, "this time I have had more company than I usually have", and mentions Abul Kalam Azad, Sardar Patel, Mahmud, Kripalani and Pantji and Asaf Ali. He also recommends George Bernard Shaw's plays and prefaces as good companions in prison.

=== Part six: January to November 1944 ===
Most of the letters in part six were written following the death of Ranjit on 14 January 1944, which left Pandit a widow before the reformation of personal law which was completed after independence.

On 14 January 1944, Nehru receives the news of Ranjit's death and writes with deep sadness. A few months later, his letter dated 22 May 1944 "was deeply philosophical". In this letter he talks of the obstacles to Pandit inheriting her husband's property, His advice here was more practical with encouragement and an offer of financial help.

=== Part seven: 1945–1947 and one letter of 1956 ===
Letters in part seven "reveal the effects of long imprisonment" and were written from Ahmednagar Fort, Bareilly Central Prison and Almora District Jail, until Nehru was released in June 1945. Pandit, during this time, was in the United States lecturing on the situation in India.

In 1947, Pandit was appointed India's first ambassador to the Soviet Union. On 10 August 1947, five days before transfer of power, Nehru writes to Pandit "Delhi is full preparations for the celebrations from 15th August onwards"...and..."we are greatly looking forward to your first reports from Moscow".

One letter from Nehru to Pandit, dated 24 May 1956, is included in part seven. Sahgal writes "it is special because it is written on Buddha Jayanti"..."an occasion important to them both". He signs it "love, Jawahar", as all the others.

== Reception ==
Very few of Pandit's responses to Nehru's letters are included in the collection. N. Manoharan of the Institute of Peace and Conflict Studies felt that it would have been interesting to read Pandit's replies, had they all been included in the book. He described this collection as reflecting the affection between both brother and sister, and showing the authority he had at home. They also show the evolution of his writing skills, his philosophical orientations, and the influence of Chinese ideas. When compared with compilations of Nehru's letters to his father and daughter, the letters to Pandit have been noted to be the only collection of letters providing a comprehensive narrative of Nehru from his twenties. Published at the same time as an edition of his letters to his daughter, both collections were reported in India Today as "complimentary". The collection reflects Nehru's affection to Pandit, as he writes to her "...you are very dear to me. There are very few persons who really count in my life and you are one of them, and you have brought great comfort to me in moments of trial."

No reason is given for the missing letters by Nehru for the years between 1913 and 1925, 1928 and 1930, January to October 1941 and December 1944. A number of footnote numbers in the book are missing corresponding footnotes.
