= John Fox (comedian) =

American comedian, born 1953

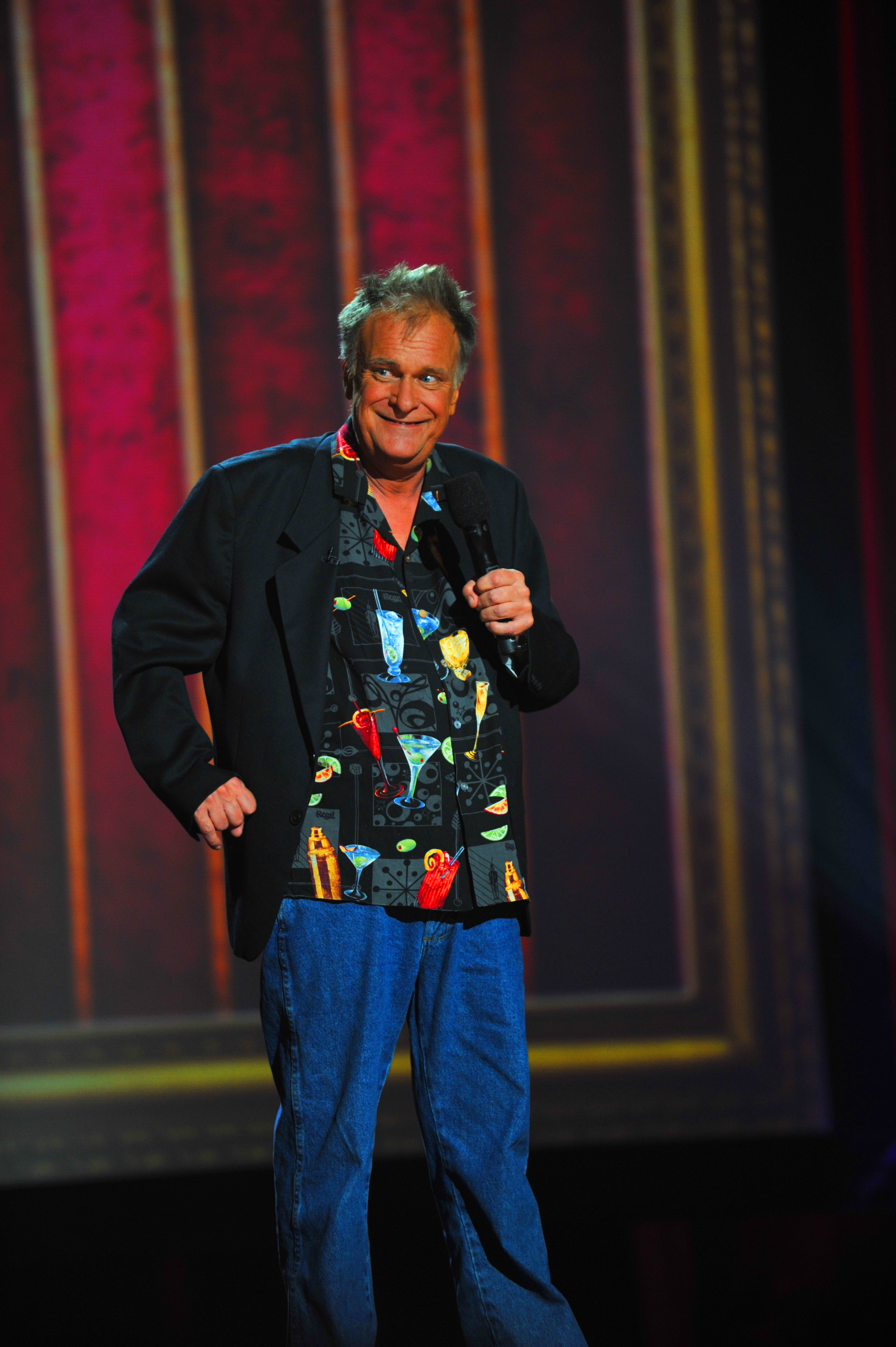
- John Fox in August 2011
- Born: April 24, 1953; Camp LeJeune, Onslow County, North Carolina
- Died: May 30, 2012 (aged 59)

John Fox (April 24, 1953 – May 30, 2012) was an American comedian.

== Life ==
John Fox was born John Edward Moore April 24, 1953 while his father was stationed at Camp Lejeune, North Carolina. He lived in Waukegan, Illinois until age 8 when the family moved to Zion, Illinois. The family returned to Waukegan when John was 13. He was an avid baseball player and was a lifelong Cubs fan.

== Career ==
Fox's first show was on June 14, 1979 at the World Famous Comedy Store. Known as the Nick Nolte of comedy, Fox had numerous television appearances on shows, including Norm Crosby's Comedy Shop, Star Search, Make Me Laugh, and Showtime Comedy Club Network. He appeared in the stand-up videos Truly Tasteless Jokes and Comedy's Dirtiest Dozen. He voiced the role of a pig in the animated feature Rover Dangerfield. He had been featured on "The Bob & Tom Show" and was the inspiration for the song "The Legend of John Fox," by Pat Godwin. Fox also appeared on Rodney Dangerfield's HBO special, Opening Night at Rodney's Place and the first Redneck Comedy Roundup DVD alongside comedians Jeff Foxworthy, Bill Engvall, and Ron White.

A popular part of Fox's routine was talking about his various previous jobs.

== Death ==
Fox was diagnosed with colon cancer in October 2011. He died of complications from the disease in May 2012 at the age of 59.

== Discography ==
- Assorted Nuts LIVE FROM Laughs Unlimited (1985)
- John Fox (1988) [LH2137-2]
- Very Unsensitive (1988) [LT2002]
- The Most Dangerous Man in Comedy (1988) [TC2003]
- Wild & Untamed (1988) [LT2004]
- Joy Jelly (1989) [LT2005]
- I'm Fat, I'm 40 (1999)
