= The Earth-Shaker =

1982 novel by Lin Carter

- Cover of first edition
- Author: Lin Carter
- Language: English
- Series: Zarkon series
- Genre: Science fiction
- Publisher: Doubleday
- Publication date: 1982
- Publication place: United States
- Media type: Print (hardcover)
- Pages: xii, 175
- ISBN: 0-385-12477-5
- Preceded by: The Volcano Ogre
- Followed by: Horror Wears Blue

The Earth-Shaker is a science fiction novel by American writer Lin Carter, the fourth in his "Zarkon, Lord of the Unknown" series. It was first published in hardcover by Doubleday in July 1982. An ebook edition was issued by Thunderchild Publishing in November 2017.

== Summary ==
Prince Zarkon's arch-enemy, Dr. Zandor Sinestro, alias Lucifer, returns for a second match. He now attempts to hold the banks of Knickerbocker City hostage and extorting millions of dollars by targeting them with artificially generated earthquakes. The key to his scheme is the secret Amsterdam fault running beneath the city.

Aided by Miss Phoenicia ("Fooey") Mulligan and a precocious newsboy, the Lord of the Unknown and the five members of his Omega team thwart the villain by confronting him in his lair between the Hudson River.

== Reception ==
Robert M. Price characterizes the Zarkon series as "five delightful novels ... Lin Carter's loving homage to Doc Savage and his creator Lester Dent." They celebrate "'the gloriously fourth-rate,' the pulps, radio, comics, and movies he loved as a kid." He notes that "[t]he novels manage quite successfully to walk the tightrope between salute and parody," and "the humor never seems to impede or undermine the action." While "[i]t is not difficult to pick out a flaw here and there" and the series is "not entirely free from Carter's later-career sloppiness ... on the whole these books are vastly superior to much of what else he was writing during the same period. The Zarkon novels all command a crisp, snappy prose, sometimes reminiscent of Lester Dent's."

Publishers Weekly credits "[t]his ... fourth of Carter's Doc Savage pastiches" with doing "a good job of recalling Lester Dent's Man of Bronze," going on to say that "Carter has a good time playing the pulp adventure clichés of the '30s and '40s, but the book is such a good imitation of that obsolete form that only readers with a nostalgic fondness for the original will really enjoy it."

The book was also reviewed by Michael E. Stamm in Science Fiction & Fantasy Book Review #8, October 1982 .

== Relation to other works ==
The "Amsterdam Fault" forming a plot point in the novel was lifted by the author from the 1939 movie serial The Phantom Creeps, in which it is discovered by the evil Dr. Zorka (portrayed by Bela Lugosi).
