= Amen Santo =

Joselito "Amen" Santo (born 1965) is a mestre of the Afro-Brazilian martial art of capoeira. He has acted in roles practicing his art in two Hollywood movies, Only the Strong and Kickboxer 4, and created much of the former's fight choreography.

He was born in 1965 in Bahia, Brazil. He revealed in an interview to papoeira.com that he became interested in capoeira, when he first saw it as a 6-year-old, accompanying his mother to the supermarket.

"The first time I saw Capoeira I was 6 years old when I went to the supermarket called Mercado de Aguinelo, where there was a roda that Master Waldemar always made, right in front of this supermarket."

He emigrated to the United States sometime later, and began teaching capoeira in Los Angeles. He is the founding director of Capoeira Batuque group of capoeiristas, and currently oversees the group's schools internationally. His schools are in Japan, Dubai, Germany, and Brazil. Its headquarters are located in Los Angeles. He is also a father of three children.
