= Laurie Dolphin =

American writer

- Occupation: Children's author

Laurie Dolphin is a designer, author, and founder of AuthorScape, a small independent book packager and publisher in New York. She is also the art curator for actor Norman Reedus. Through her imprint Dolphin Books, Laurie Dolphin published and was the editor of The Last Dalai Lama? (2018) a companion book to filmmaker Mickey Lemle's award-winning documentary featuring a foreword by The Dalai Lama. The book was the recipient of the Best Book Arts Craftsmanship award from the 2020 Independent Publisher Book Awards.

== Publishing ==
Dolphin has worked on numerous projects in the pop culture, art, photography, and health and wellness genres. Notable projects include Evidence: The Art of Candy Jernigan (1999), This Is Today (a history of NBC's The Today Show) (2003), Giving Back (2011) with Meera Gandhi and Flash Frames: A New Pop Culture (2002), a book highlighting Flash art from the internet co-edited with her husband Stuart S. Shapiro and featuring an introduction by Stan Lee. Most recently, Dolphin has partnered with actor and photographer Norman Reedus, to design and publish a book of his photography called The Sun's Coming Up Like A Big Bald Head (2013) and a forthcoming fan art compilation called Thanks For All The Niceness: Fan Art From Around The World (2014). In 2016, Laurie Dolphin designed and published a special edition book of photography by Gelila Bekele called "GUZO," which documents the daily life of tribes in rural Ethiopia.

Dolphin's work has been featured in The New York Times, San Francisco Chronicle and received the Certificate of Design Excellence from Print's Regional Design Annual for Evidence in 2000.

== Children's books ==
In addition to her work as a designer and publisher, Dolphin is the author of several children's books including Georgia To Georgia: Making Friends in the USSR (1991), Neve Shalom Wahat Al-Salam: Oasis of Peace (1993) and Our Journey From Tibet (1997). Her work as an author often focuses on peace projects in conflict zones that aim to teach children about diversity and peace. She received the "Children's Book of the Year Award" from Parents Magazine and won the 1994 National Jewish Honor Book Award.

== Ask. Dr. Mao ==
Dolphin has worked extensively with Dr. Maoshing Ni to produce his health and wellness book series that includes Secrets of Longevity: Hundreds of Ways to Live to be 100. With Ni, she co-founded and is the creative director for the natural health search engine, Ask Dr. Mao.

== Bibliography ==
As author

- Georgia to Georgia (1991)
- Oasis of Peace (1993)
- Our Journey From Tibet (1997)
- Magical Objects From Around The World (1997)

As editor

- Evidence: The Art of Candy Jernigan (1999)
- Flash Frames: A New Pop Culture (2002)
- Today's Kitchen (2005)
- The Last Dalai Lama? (2018)
