= Prison and Chocolate Cake =

1954 memoir by Nayantara Sahgal

- First US edition, Alfred A. Knopf, New York, 1954.
- Author: Nayantara Sahgal
- Language: English
- Subject: Memoir
- Publisher: Alfred A. Knopf (New York), Victor Gollancz Ltd (London)
- Publication date: 1954
- Pages: 236
- Followed by: A Time to be Happy (1958)

Prison and Chocolate Cake is the first of two early memoirs by Nayantara Sahgal, first published by Alfred A. Knopf (New York) and Victor Gollancz (London) in 1954, and includes her childhood experiences of her family during the Indian independence movement in the 1930s and '40s. It was written during the winter of 1952–53 when she was 25, married and with two young children.

The title is based on an incident in the early 1930s when Sahgal, at age three, witnessed police arrive to take her father to prison. At the time, the family were having chocolate cake for tea, a treat that day instead of the usual bread and butter. Central to her story are her father, the scholar Ranjit Sitaram Pandit, her mother, the former ambassador to the United Nations Vijaya Lakshmi Pandit, and her uncle, Jawaharlal Nehru, India's first prime minister. Prison sentences for several family members became more frequent and Sahgal's memories of them increasingly unpleasant as she was expected to stay composed and not show her distress. At the age of 12 in 1939, she tried to understand the concept of non-violence at the onset of the Second World War, through letters to her father in jail. In 1943, she was sent with her sister to the US to complete her education. Whilst there, her father died in prison in India. After completing her studies at Wellesley, she returned to India in 1947 shortly after independence. The book ends with the assassination of Gandhi in 1948.

The book has been used as a source for the study of women in history, and provides insights into how the politics of the 1930s and '40s in India affected the Nehru children. It was followed by A Time to be Happy (1958).

== Background and title ==
Nayantara Sahgal, an educated, widely-travelled member of the Indian elite of the 1940s, is the daughter of the scholar Ranjit Sitaram Pandit and former ambassador to the United Nations Vijaya Lakshmi Pandit, niece of India's first prime minister Jawaharlal Nehru, and cousin of India's third prime minister Indira Gandhi.

The title Prison and Chocolate Cake comes from an incident in the early 1930s which Sahgal describes as her earliest political memory, one day at tea when she was age three. Chocolate cake was a treat that day as usually they would have bread and butter. When her elder sister Lekha asked their mother why police had arrived at their home during tea, their mother "explained that they had come to take Papu [their father] to prison, but that it was nothing to worry about, that he wanted to go. So we kissed him goodbye and watched him leave; talking cheerfully to the policeman". Describing the incident as "far from unpleasant", she recounts in the book that "We ate our chocolate cake and, in our infant minds, prison became in some mysterious way, associated with chocolate cake". The book is the first of Sahgal's autobiographies, one of two of her early works based on her childhood memories covering the years 1943 to 1948. It was written during the winter of 1952–53 when she was 25, married, and had two young children.

== Publication and content ==
Prison and Chocolate Cake was first published in 1954 by Victor Gollancz Ltd (London), and Alfred A. Knopf (New York). The book begins with a dedication to Sahgal's parents. There is a preface, contents page, a listing of the eight illustrations in the book, and a glossary. The Alfred A. Knopf edition has an additional index and a section on who is who in the book. The book has 20 chapters and regularly interspersed are footnotes with explanations, some cited with references. It was translated into Hindi, and French in 1957.

The book includes Sahgal's memoirs, accounts of her sisters Gita and Chandralekha, and of her family during the Indian independence movement. She describes what it was like to grow up with both parents focussed on the Gandhian philosophy of non-violent civil disobedience during India's freedom struggle in the 1940s. In her words "our growing was India's growing up into India's political maturity – a different kind of political maturity from any that the world had seen before, based on an ideology inspired by self-sacrifice, compassion and peace". It includes her childhood memories of several generations of the Nehru family, encounters with Gandhi, who sometimes visited Sahgal's family home, and the politicians that visited them.

== Synopsis ==
Sahgal begins the story in 1943, mid-World War II when she was in her teens, and en-route to the United States to complete her education. At the time, her parents and several others of her family were in prison for opposing British rule. She questions her parents' courage to send her and her sister abroad at such a time. On the ship, she hears experiences from Polish refugees from Russia, and US soldiers returning from the Pacific War, one of whom was surprised that she could be Indian, as she spoke English like he did. She describes several encounters on the ship and then later in the US, with people intrigued to know about India from her.

Sahgal says that she writes in the order that she remembers events rather than chronologically. An account then follows of political life at Swaraj Bhavan, their family mansion in Allahabad, and daily routines at the newer Anand Bhawan in the 1930s, and how the non-cooperation movement changed life for the Nehru family. Politicians in her memoirs include Sir Stafford Cripps, Maulana Azad and Sarojini Naidu. Included is her first encounter with Gandhi, dropping her elder sister off at boarding school, parties at home, life at Woodstock School and her uncle Nehru, who she calls Mamu. Her parents and Nehru are central to her story and were jailed several times. She explains that it was voluntary, occasions to be congratulated upon and family and friends patted them on their backs on their way. Sahgal, as a young child, wanting to be old enough to go to prison too, was expected to be proud, not show sorrow, but hold a stiff upper lip; crying was in secret, she writes. Recollections of increasing time spent with servants include one of Hari, who is given an encouraging send-off when he too is arrested and sent to prison. Later visits to prison to see her parents are unpleasant and after the announcement of the Quit India Movement, contact by letter and in person becomes almost nonexistent. Sahgal is 12 when war breaks out in 1939. In a series of letters she discusses with her father, then in prison, several political topics including whether India should help Britain, non-violent disobedience and communism.

In 1944, after the death of her father, her mother joined her in the US. There, she made several connections including Paul Robeson, Helen Keller, Margaret Sanger and Pearl S. Buck. In the US, Sahgal describes the celebrity status they experienced as the "Nehru nieces". After completing her studies at Wellesley, Massachusetts, Sahgal returned to India in October 1947, shortly after India's independence. The book ends with the assassination of Gandhi.

== Reviews ==
In 1954, The New York Times described the book as a "relaxed account of life in both worlds". W. F. Whyte in International Affairs noted Sahgal's letter (age 12) to her father in 1939 as she tried to understand the concept of non-violence at the onset of the War. The reply she received from her father in Lucknow prison, Whyte says, "reads today like a pertinent footnote to history". Historian Jeanne d'Ucel appreciated the author's sense of humour throughout the book.

Analyses of the book in later years include that of N.D.R. Chandra in the second volume of Modern Indian Writing in English: Critical Perceptions, in which he says Sahgal "displays her sharp and acute awareness of the political and social issues of India...her feelings for politics and command over English are more impressive than her art". In Lorna Sage's The Cambridge Guide to Women's Writing in English , the book is categorised as part of Sahgal's first phase of writing: "the early semi-autobiographical, feminist novels reflecting contemporary politics". It is one of Sahgal's works that has contributed to her being grouped with other Indian women writers such as Kamala Markandaya and Attia Hosain. Meena Khorana writes in her bibliography of English language books, The Indian Subcontinent in Literature for Children and Young Adults, that it "provides an intimate and enjoyable account of how the Nehru children were affected". The book is an archival source for studies in women in history.

== Sequels ==
Prison and Chocolate Cake was followed by A Time to be Happy (1958), From Fear Set Free (1962), This Time of Morning (1965), Storm in Chandigarh (1969), and The Day in Shadow. In 1990, Sahgal stated in an interview that she would not write any further autobiographies, but then published Relationship (1994) and Point of View: A Personal Response to Life (1997).

== Editions ==
- Prison and Chocolate Cake. London: Victor Gollancz Ltd. 1954. OCLC 504385876.
- Prison and Chocolate Cake. New York: Alfred A. Knopf. 1954.
- Prison and Chocolate Cake. HarperCollins. 2007. ISBN 978-81-7223-689-2. OCLC 986530116.
