= Rich Like Us =

Book by Nayantara Sahgal

- Rich Like Us, first edition (UK)
- Author: Nayantara Sahgal
- Cover artist: Candy Jernigan
- Language: English
- Genre: novel, historical/political fiction
- Publisher: Heinemann; London, UK
- Publication date: 1985
- Publication place: United Kingdom, London (1985 1st ed.)
- Pages: 301 p.
- ISBN: 0-434-66610-6
- OCLC: 12437248
- Dewey Decimal: 823 19
- LC Class: PR9499.3.S154 R5 1985

Rich Like Us is a historical and political fiction novel by Nayantara Sahgal. Set in New Delhi during the chaotic time between 1932 and the mid-1970s, it follows the lives of two female protagonists, Rose and Sonali, and their fight to live in a time of political upheaval and social re-organization.

The novel brought its author the 1986 Sahitya Akademi Award for English, by the Sahitya Akademi, India's National Academy of Letters.

== Title ==
Rich Like Us takes its title from a brief meeting at the beginning of the novel that Dev and his wife Nishi have with a businessman named Mr. Neuman, who reflects that all he has been told teaches him that if the poor of India would "do like we do, they’d be rich like us," yet seeing the poverty in the streets in person, he finds this hard to believe. The book’s title brings up this question of why the fat of society refuses to "trickle down" to the masses. This issue affects both protagonists, as Rose continues to question the tactics of her stepson Dev and Sonali sees first-hand the extravagances of the ruling party. Wealth is certainly not portrayed as the way to happiness in the novel, as the elite main characters seem trapped in a web of corruption, power and money from which they both stem. However, the plight of the handless beggar that hangs around Rose’s home certainly does not glamorize the lives of the Indian poor. Rich Like Us is a phrase introduced as a question, and continuing as such throughout the novel.

== Plot summary ==
This historical fiction entwines the fate of two upper-class women, Rose, a British immigrant and wife to powerful native business man Ram with Sonali, a highly educated young civil servant. The former struggles to find a sense of home in this foreign society, filled with ancient customs, including the sati, and exotic social standards. She is entangled in a three-pronged marriage, as she is the second wife of Ram’s. Rose suffers to understand the Indian culture, and its ramifications on the female spirit. As Ram’s health deteriorates, she realizes her rights as wife are in question. Dev, Ram’s son from his other wife, Mona, schemes to take all Ram’s assets by disposing of Rose. In fear, Rose turns to Sonali, her friend and niece. Sonali is an anomaly to the average Indian, aristocratic woman. She deals with the living and working in New Delhi during the political upheaval of the Emergency and is divided between two worlds, one representing her ideals and longing for progression and the other that embodies her upper-crust, conservative culture. From these two characters branch off numerous other tales, which provide a deep and thorough overview of life for all people during this critical historical period. At root of these stories lies the duplicitous role of women in the dynamic, chaotic, new India of the mid 20th century.

== Structure ==
The structure of Rich Like Us involves a number of chapters that are narrated in turn by a third person omniscient narrator and the character of Sonali, the chapters moving freely back and forth through the more distant past and the recent past of the story’s current action. Sonali tells the reader about the current events of the story, sometimes pausing to read back into the far distant past of her paternal ancestors, while the narration that follows Rose (and briefly Nishi) focuses on the early years of Rose’s marriage to Ram, moving on in chronological progression as though they have only just gone by. The different time periods are kept separate by the barriers of the chapters in the book, but their stories are still told side-by-side through the text’s ability to exist in different planes of time.

== Major themes ==
Political corruption (absolute power corrupts absolutely, etc.): The Prime Minister declares a state of emergency, allowing her to have supreme and autocratic control. During this time the country is in a state of disarray. The wealthy seek to profit, while commoners are crushed by the impending globalization. The government's power grows to such an extent that it begins to force men who are low in the caste system to have vasectomies.

Political Ideology & Its Repercussions: Ravi embraces communism in his youth and will only accept the exact following of the doctrine.

Colonialism: India's long history as a British colony has had numerous side effects. Those growing up within this period feel both Indian and British. This novel details the complicated effects colonization has had on this country and its people. Rose, although born and raised in Britain, feels just as much British as Indian, India being her home since her marriage to Ram over 30 years ago. Although raised in India, Sonali's experiences in the UK during her student years and her constant interaction with British people have left her confused as well: to whom should she show her allegiance?

Women as Objects vs. People: Both Rose and Sonali engage in external and internal conflict with this distinction. Sonali's past experiences have consisted mainly of seeing women in submissive roles that deny their true selves, as when her friend Bimmie gets married: "But I was hypnotized by Bimmie's nose ring, the sandalpaste dots on her face, eyes downcast, and those manacled hands resting submissively in her red silk lap. This was never Bimmie." Sonali is thrilled to shuck off the chains she feels bound by as a woman when she goes off to Oxford. Rose also feels this conflict raging around and within her: as Ram's second wife, she will have very few rights when he dies, and may end up as just another piece of furniture for Dev to throw away. She also struggles with herself about whether the role she has chosen fits her, whether she has become submissive to Ram's will and whether she should not have settled for the role of a second wife.

Wealth’s Ties to Power: This connection seems inevitable, even inseparable, in the novel. The elite have everything: the good Scotch whisky, food on their tables, even a political regime that will turn a blind eye to certain illegal acts. The poor, however, are likely to be arrested and tortured for the barest hint, even a fabricated hint, of committing any crime against the reigning power.

The Power of Love: This theme asserts itself most prominently through the character of Rose, who loves her husband Ram so dearly that she is willing to leave behind her home and everything she knows in England to take a position she can hardly even justify to herself: his second wife. She is willing to sacrifice everything to be with him. The young Sonali is not any man's bride, but she finds herself unable to stop caring for Ravi Kachru, her childhood friend and later lover.

== Main characters ==
Rose – one of the two main protagonists of the story. She was born and raised in a blue-collar family in London. On encountering Ram at a chocolate shop, she is quickly swept off her feet and leaves with him for India. It is at this juncture that the story truly begins. She recognizes the alien she is within this culture and even within her new house, seeing as she shares a husband with another woman, Mona. Rose's strong convictions, quick wit, and matter-of-fact nature propel her into uncomfortable and threatening situations. She feels lost in this world of constant change, and struggles to understand this culture and herself.

Sonali – the other protagonist of the novel is a young, female Indian civil servant who is struggling to find truth and logic in her ever-changing homeland, India. As part of the elite caste in New Delhi, she grows up without worries but filled with naivete. In her years at Oxford, she reconnects with Ravi Kachru, a childhood friend. It is with him that her political knowledge blossoms. Ravi's ardour for communism deepens, yet Sonali, despite Ravi's efforts, questions its plausibility. Sonali mentions, "I did admire and envy his commitment, it was so cloudless. But I couldn't understand why we had to keep cutting and pasting Western concepts together and tying ourselves to them forever as if Europe were the centre of the universe, and the Bible and Marx were the last word on mankind." This relationship falls apart with their return to India. Ravi quickly involves himself with the ruling party and Sonali becomes a civil servant. Sonali, too, feels lost in this new India, most especially during the Emergency, when the autocratic rule once so staunchly despised by Ravi comes to power with his support.

Ram – Rose's husband, who is already married to Mona when they wed. His fanciful taste for beautiful finery and European goods causes trouble with the inventory of his shop until Rose is able to convince him to look around for more native materials. He loves Rose, but he also loved Mona, and he also falls head-over-heels in love with a woman named Marcella during his marriage to Rose. Theirs is an intellectual connection Rose feels powerless to compete with. Much later in their lives, Ram falls critically ill, and he is comatose in the context of the story's present action.

Dev – Ram's spoiled son. He is a worrisome boy who grows into a man who has broken no ties to his petulant childhood. He continues to pull "teenage pranks" well into middle age, expects to be given everything in life without having to work for it, and most of all he greatly resents his stepmother Rose. He still feels that she is an unwelcome presence in the house, supplanting his mother and causing nothing but trouble with her uninhibited tongue.

== Literary significance and reception ==
"…a leading example of India’s emergent writers, blending the Hindu with the Christian outlook, possessed equally of a cool analytical brain and broadly human sympathies." – The Times

At its first release in 1985, Rich Like Us received wide critical acclaim. The latter publication dates in 1999 and 2003 followed suit, with high praise and recognition. Rich Like Us continues to be the best known novel of Nayantara Sahgal.

== Allusions to history, geography and current science ==
This novel is set in one of India’s most unruly chapter of history, tracing back from the Partition the Indian independence and The Emergency. The Emergency, which plays a central role in this novel, marks the 21-month period between June 1975 and March 1977 in India. During this time, President Fakhruddin Ali Ahmed declared a state of emergency in India. This announcement gave Ahmed the right to suspend the elections and civil liberties at his will, hence bringing India’s people into a state of extreme discontent.

== Awards and nominations ==
- Sinclair Prize for Best Novel, 1985 (U.K.)
- Sahitya Akademi Award for Best Novel, 1986 (India)

== Publication history ==
This novel was first published in London in 1985 by the Heinemann Publishing Company. In 1986, the first United States edition was released, being published by Norton & Co. of New York City.

== Academic analysis ==
Mann, Harveen Sachdeva. "Elliptic Feminism and Nationalism in Nayantara Sahgal's Rich Like Us." International Fiction Review (1993).

Hassan, Nigeenah; Sharma, Mukesh. "India Under Emergency: Rich Like us Nayantara Sahgal" International Journal of Innovative Science and Research Technology (2017)
