= Otto Petersen =

American ventriloquist and comedian (1960–2014)

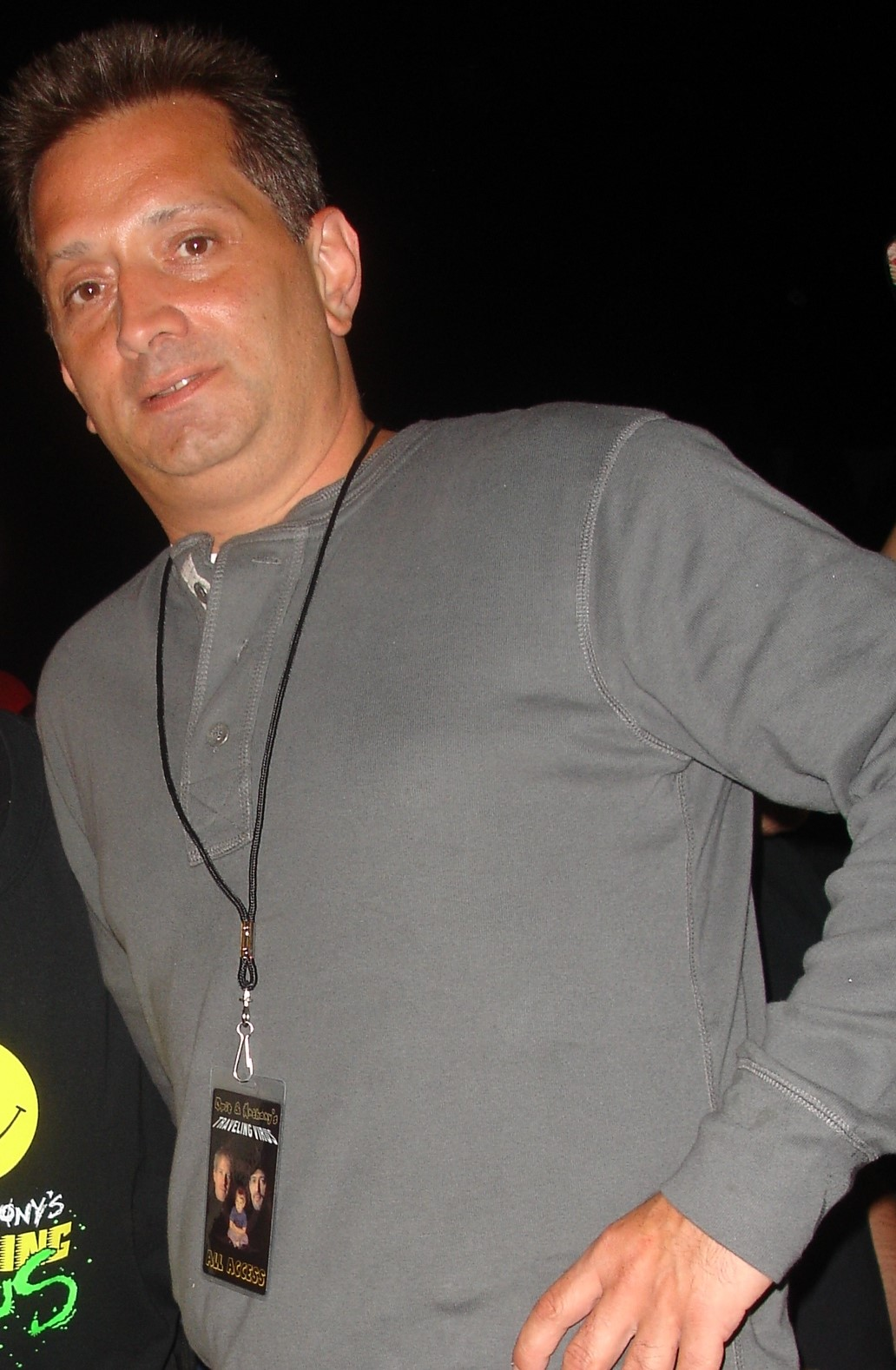
- Petersen in 2006 during the Opie and Anthony's Traveling Virus Comedy Tour
- Born: Otto Sol Petersen; July 29, 1960; Brooklyn, New York
- Died: April 13, 2014 (aged 53); Keyport, New Jersey

Comedy career
- Years active: 1970s–2014
- Medium: Stand-up comedy Film; Television
- Genres: Ventriloquism, observational comedy, black comedy, insult comedy, prop comedy

Otto Sol Petersen (July 29, 1960 – April 13, 2014) was an American ventriloquist, comedian, and actor known for his act Otto and George, which he performed with his dummy George Dudley. Petersen began performing with George as a street act in Manhattan and Brooklyn in the early 1970s. In the late 1970s the act moved into night clubs and began to evolve into an "X-rated" act.

== Life and career ==
Petersen was born in Brooklyn, New York City, to a Danish father and Jewish American mother, and raised on Staten Island. He is survived by his mother Sylvia Petersen, a brother Tom Petersen, sister Lona Petersen and long time companion, Tricia Conte. Petersen began to perform as a ventriloquist when he was seven. Among his influences during his early life was watching Paul Winchell and his dummies Jerry Mahoney and Knucklehead Smiff. He bought his first dummy at a magic shop in Times Square in 1974 for $350.

Petersen dropped out of high school and became a street performer at thirteen, initially in the New York City area, the college circuit, and at gigs in the Catskills. His act included insults and nursery rhymes with humorous and gross alterations. In 1976, John Lennon gave him $2 after he and Yoko Ono watched him perform in Central Park. In May 1977, his original dummy named George, which he had used for two years, was stolen when someone had taken a duffel bag containing George from inside his car. Made from basswood, Petersen had purchased George for $300 from a man in Madison, Wisconsin in 1975. Petersen then used a replacement named Phil that a friend had made. The stolen George was the third puppet named George that Petersen had used. The first was stabbed by an audience member after the dummy called him ugly; the second was sold for use in a production of Annie. In 1980, the 20-year-old Petersen was named Best Novelty Act at the inaugural New York Nightclub Showcase Awards held at Good Times, a club in New York City. By this time, his dummy was renamed George, and Petersen had starred in a pilot episode for a proposed television series, No Holds Barred.

In the early 1980s, Petersen moved on from street performing and took his act into local comedy clubs. He then developed an X-rated act in order to set himself apart from other comics. In 2002, Petersen revealed that he had used eight dummies in his career. The one he used at this time was hand carved by Tim Selberg.

Petersen was a guest on Opie and Anthony on WNEW and XM Satellite Radio from April 2000 until his death. He also appeared on The Howard Stern Show, Penn & Teller's Sin City Spectacular & Bullshit!, Full Frontal Comedy on Showtime, and Comedy's Dirtiest Dozen. Petersen performed with George at the Adult Film Awards ceremony in Las Vegas on two occasions. He was not asked for a return appearance having offended some of the audience with his material.

Petersen described George as "a homophobic, angry, sexist, racist doll".

In 2004, Petersen was featured in the 2005 documentary film The Aristocrats where he told a version of the joke of the same name.

In 2007, Petersen was a featured comic as part of Ventriloquist Week on Late Show with David Letterman. He looked back on his performance as challenging because of the necessity to use more clean material as opposed to the adult-themed act he is used to.

In 2009, Petersen said that George Carlin had approached him after a gig some years before and said that he was a fan. Also in 2009, Petersen starred in the independent documentary film I'm No Dummy, directed by Bryan W. Simon. The comedian Andrew Dice Clay used a large number of the nursery rhymes that Otto told for years well before the rise of Dice.

Performing for over 30 years, Otto was well renowned as both a comedian and a ventriloquist.

One of the team's last ventures was their Internet variety show The Pig Roast with Otto & George.

Otto & George performed all over the U.S. and Canada. The duo performed several times at the annual Just for Laughs Comedy Festival in Montreal, Canada.

== Illness and death ==
In June 2013, Petersen fell ill with bacterial meningitis and was placed in a coma for nearly a week. After he had recovered in the following month, comedian Reverend Bob Levy organised a stand-up show for Petersen to help with his medical bills and loss of income.

Petersen died in his sleep at his home in Keyport, New Jersey on April 13, 2014, aged 53.

== Filmography ==
=== Feature films ===
- Comedy's Dirtiest Dozen (1988)
- The Force Within (1993)
- Roswell and Alistair (1998)
- White Chicks Incorporated (1998)
- American Dummy (2002)
- Christmas UFO
- The Aristocrats (2005)
- I'm No Dummy (2009)
- Archie Black: The Worst (2014)

=== Television ===
- The Morton Downey Jr. Show (1988)
- Playboy Channel's 'The Club (1990)
- The Joe Franklin Show (1990)
- Full Frontal Comedy (1996)
- Late Show with David Letterman (2007)
- Penn & Teller's Bullshit! (2007)
