= Comedy's Dirtiest Dozen =

- VHS cover
- Directed by: Lenny Wong
- Written by: Tim Allen; John Fox; Joey Gaynor; Bill Hicks; Stephanie Hodge; Monty Hoffman; Jackie Martling; Steven Pearl; Otto Petersen; Chris Rock; Larry Scarano; Thea Vidale
- Produced by: Stuart S. Shapiro
- Starring: Tim Allen; John Fox; Joey Gaynor; Bill Hicks; Stephanie Hodge; Monty Hoffman; Jackie Martling; Steven Pearl; Otto Petersen; Chris Rock; Larry Scarano; Thea Vidale
- Release date: 1 October 1988
- Running time: 97 minutes
- Language: English

Comedy's Dirtiest Dozen is a 1988 stand-up comedy concert film directed by Lenny Wong and starring Tim Allen, Chris Rock, Bill Hicks, Jackie Martling, Otto Peterson, Monty Hoffman, Steven Pearl, John Fox, Joey Gaynor, Larry Scarano, Stephanie Hodge and Thea Vidale. Ben Creed was the emcee.

== Production ==
Island Films (an offshoot of Island Records) intended to run the film in theaters and not on cable TV. Due to financial changes at Island, the film was only screened in New York and Los Angeles and only released on VHS and DVD after Allen and Rock became stars.

== Release ==
It has been shown on The Ovation Channel. Richard Baker and Rick Messina of Messina Baker Management auditioned hundred of comics in New York and Los Angeles for this production.

== Reception ==
The New York Times wrote: "The film's producers maintain that these performers are legends on the regional comedy club circuit, but that the "adult" content of their material keeps them off cable comedy and talk shows. Based on what we see of their routines, it's obvious why."

Playboy singled out Chris Rock and Larry Scarano as standouts. Otto & George and Bill Hicks were praised in other reviews.
