= Stuart S. Shapiro =

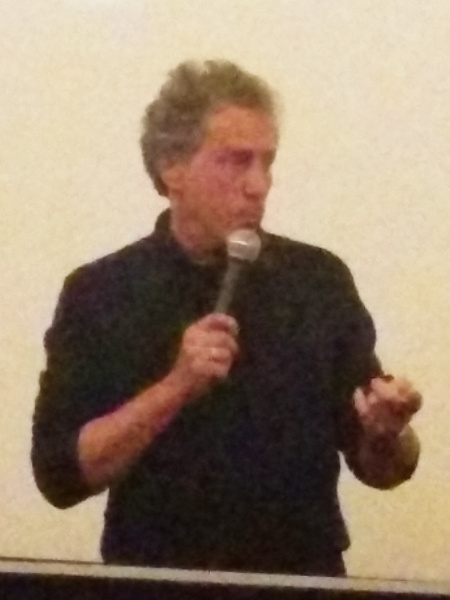
- Born: United States
- Occupations: Producer, writer, director, entrepreneur

Stuart S. Shapiro is a producer, writer, director, and Internet entrepreneur. Shapiro began his career as an independent film distributor in 1974 by starting International Harmony which distributed TunnelVision, Neil Young's Rust Never Sleeps, Bob Marley's Reggae Sunsplash, The Sex Pistols' DOA, and Tarzoon: Shame of the Jungle.

As a producer, Shapiro's credits include Mondo New York and Comedy's Dirtiest Dozen. The New Yorker noted the importance of Chris Rock's appearance in Comedy's Dirtiest Dozen, saying it "helped earn him a place in the cast of 'Saturday Night Live', two years later, and that attitude helped make him the defining comic of the hip-hop generation." Other credits include Only The Strong, from which he produced the famous Mazda song "Zoom Zoom", and USA networks TV series Night Flight, a youth–targeted variety show he created which ran from 1981 to 1996. VH1 named Night Flight one of the 10 greatest Hard Rock and Heavy Metal TV shows of all time, saying it was "the single greatest rock omnibus program ever aired." Shapiro also produced the 72-hour live webcast of Woodstock '99, notable for being one of the largest of its kind at the time.

In 2002 and 2003 respectively, Shapiro edited Flash Frames, a book highlighting Flash art from the Internet, with his wife, Laurie Dolphin. He also produced the CD accompaniment to the book This is Today, a history of NBC's Today Show. In December 2018, Shapiro published his book, IDENTIFI YOURSELF, A Journey F*ck You Creative Courage.

== Entrepreneurship ==
Shapiro is the founder and president of iConstituent, which provides online communications to the United States Congress. He has founded several Internet communication ventures, including Woodstock.com, Firstlook.com, ArtistEnt, and Patronet with Todd Rundgren and Danny Goldberg, one of the first Internet artist music subscription services.

== Filmography ==
=== Producer ===
- Watermelon's Baked and Baking (2003)
- Flash Frames (2002)
- Only The Strong (1993)
- Dance International Video Magazine Premiere Edition (1990)
- Impact Video Magazine (1989)
- Gorgon Video Magazine (1989)
- The Heavy Weights of Comedy (1988)
- Comedy's Dirtiest Dozen (1988)
- Mondo New York (1988)
- Vandemonium Plus (1987)
- Night Flight (1981)

=== Director ===
- Flash Frames (2002)
- Midnight Rider (2001)
- The Heavy Weights of Comedy (1988)
- Night Flight (1981)

=== Writer ===
- Midnight Rider (2001)
- Comedy's Dirtiest Dozen (1988)
- Night Flight (1981)
