= Night Flight Plus =

Video-on-demand service

- Website type: Entertainment
- Products: Streaming media
- Website: www.nightflightplus.com
- Registration: $6.99/month; $59.99/year
- Launched: March 23, 2016
- Current status: Active

Night Flight Plus is a video-on-demand service offering original episodes of the 1980s USA Network TV show Night Flight. In addition to archived episodes of the show, the service features films in the music documentary, concert, horror and cult genres. The channel is currently available on Roku, Amazon Fire TV, Apple TV, Chromecast and online at their website. The site launched with subscriptions offered at $4.99 a month and $39.99 a year. Describing the launch of the channel, Stuart Shapiro told The A.V. Club, "Our goal with Night Flight PLUS is to resurrect the editorial spirit of Night Flight with the same original curatorial edge we had in the '80s for a new digital generation." Night Flight Plus offers unlimited simultaneous streams but does not support offline viewing due to music licensing restrictions. While the app is available across multiple devices, users have reported some technical issues such as system crashes and inconsistent user experience.
