= Only the Strong (film) =

- Directed by: Sheldon Lettich
- Written by: Sheldon Lettich; Luis Esteban
- Produced by: Samuel Hadida; Stuart S. Shapiro; Steven Menkin
- Starring: Mark Dacascos; Stacey Travis; Paco Christian Prieto; Todd Susman; Geoffrey Lewis
- Edited by: Stephen Semel
- Music by: Harvey W. Mason
- Production companies: Davis Films; Freestone Pictures; August Entertainment
- Distributed by: 20th Century Fox
- Release date: August 27, 1993
- Running time: 99 minutes
- Language: English
- Budget: $6 million
- Box office: $3.3 million (United States)

Only the Strong is a 1993 martial arts film directed by Sheldon Lettich, starring Mark Dacascos. It is considered to be the only Hollywood film that showcases capoeira, an Afro-Brazilian martial art, from beginning to end.

== Plot ==
Former Green Beret Louis Stevens returns to his hometown of Miami after completing military service in Brazil, only to learn that his old high school has become a haven for gangs and drug dealers. After Stevens uses his capoeira skills to kick several drug dealers off the school property, Mr. Kerrigan, one of Stevens' old teachers, sees the impact that Stevens has on the students. Kerrigan gives him the task of teaching capoeira to a handful of the worst at-risk students at the school, giving Stevens an abandoned fire station as their practice area. While doing so, Stevens earns the ire of the local drug lord, Silverio Oliveiras, whose younger cousin, Orlando Oliveiras, is one of Stevens' students. Silverio is also a master of capoeira, and he engages Stevens in combat, beating him viciously. The horrified Orlando resolves to learn everything he can from Stevens. Stevens' class learns quickly, and they become very skilled at capoeira. The principal, delighted, proposes a district-wide capoeira program to the school board. After a field trip with his class, Stevens once again clashes with Silverio, who declares war against him.

Silverio's gang terrorizes the high school and sets fire to Kerrigan's classroom, resulting in the death of one of Stevens' students, Donovan, who is also a musical prodigy. As a result of this incident, Stevens is accused at fault, banished from the school grounds and the capoeira program is terminated. In retaliation to the attack, Stevens sneaks into Silverio's chop shop and defeats the workers before setting a cash-filled car on fire. Furious, Silverio orders the gang to bring Stevens to him alive. Orlando flees to get help. After a desperate battle, Stevens is finally captured and taken to a bonfire, where Silverio awaits. However, Stevens' capoeira students bar their path in an attempt to rescue their teacher. Before a brawl can ensue, the exhausted Stevens challenges Silverio to single combat to win back his students. After a grueling battle, Stevens defeats Silverio before the police arrive, sending the gang scattering in all directions. With this defeat, Silverio's reputation as crime lord is gone.

Stevens' capoeira program proves such a success that his students graduate from high school. To celebrate, they join a Brazilian capoeira team to perform for Stevens at the graduation ceremony.

== Cast ==
- Mark Dacascos as Louis Stevens
- Stacey Travis as Dianna
- Paco Christian Prieto as Silverio Oliveiras
- Geoffrey Lewis as Mr. Kerrigan
- Todd Susman as Mr. Cochran
- Jeffrey Anderson-Gunter as Philippe
- Richard Coca as Orlando Oliveiras
- Roman Cardwell as Shay
- Ryan Bollman as Donovan
- Christian Klemash as Eddie
- John Fionte as Hector Cervantes
- John Gregory Kasper as Coach Kasper
- Phyllis Sukoff as Mrs. Esposito
- Mellow Man Ace as Student Rapper
- Stuart S. Shapiro as John
- Joselito "Amen" Santo as Javier
- Adeniri S. Ajamu as Chief Ajamo
- Antoni Corone as Green Beret Sergeant
- Saudia Young as Hooker
- Sergio Pereira as Silverio's Bodyguard #1
- Michael F. Lagapa as Silverio's Bodyguard #2
- Sergio Kato as Silverio's Bodyguard #3 (uncredited)
- C.C. DeNeira as Hooker (uncredited)

== Production ==
Though Mark Dacascos is a talented martial artist, his background is not initially in capoeira. Just prior to his audition, he received his training from famed capoeirista Amen Santo, who was responsible for much of the fight choreography and has a small role in the film.

== Soundtrack ==
Only the Strong (Original Motion Picture Soundtrack), composed of eleven hip hop and capoeira music songs, was released in 1993 via Fox Records. It features contributions from Jibril Serapis Bey, Marcel Branch, Patrick McCain, Donna Simon, Mellow Man Ace, Miami Boyz and New Version of Soul, as well as Kao Rossman, Scott G., Iki Levy, Stuart S. Shapiro, Blueblood, DJ Muggs, Kid Fury and LRoc on production duties. The most prominent songs in the film are Serapis Bey's "Paranauȇ" and "Zoom-Zoom-Zoom" - the latter being more well known as the theme song for Mazda's TV commercials.

No.	Title	Writer(s)	Producer(s)	Length
1.	"Paranauê" (performed by Jibril Serapis Bey)	Kao Rossman; Stuart Shapiro	Kao Rossman; Stuart S. Shapiro	3:10
2.	"Miami Boyz" (performed by Miami Boyz)	A. Cuff; Brian Graham	Kid Fury of Bass Patrol	3:51
3.	"Zoom-Zoom-Zoom" (performed by Jibril Serapis Bey)	Rossman	Kao Rossman	2:53
4.	"Comin' Together"	Scot Wendell Greene; Levy Yizhaq	Scott G.; Iki Levy	1:37
5.	"Babalu Bad Boy" (performed by Mellow Man Ace)	Ulpiano Reyes; Lawrence Muggerud	DJ Muggs	3:43
6.	"Swang da Funk" (performed by New Version of Soul)	Brion H. Gibson; James Elbert Phillips; James Ray Hall; Michael Bernard Crocker; Michael O. Johnson; Phillip Madison Jones; S. Owings	Blueblood; LRoc	4:17
7.	"Donovan's Mix"	Rossman; Tony Vargas	Kao Rossman; Stuart S. Shapiro	2:55
8.	"Olelê, O'Lalá" (performed by Jibril Serapis Bey)	Vargas	Kao Rossman	3:09
9.	"Enter the Dojo"	Yizhaq	Scott G.; Iki Levy	3:22
10.	"Only the Strong" (performed by Marcel Branch, Patrick McCain and Donna Simon)	Marcel Branch; Patrick McCain; Donna Aileen Simon; Yizhaq; Greene; Rossman; Shapiro	Scott G.; Iki Levy	4:10
11.	"Only the Strong (Remix)" (performed by Marcel Branch, Patrick McCain and Donna Simon)	Branch; McCain; Simon; Greene; Yizhaq; Rossman; Shapiro	Scott G.; Iki Levy; The Baka Boyz (add.)	3:04
Total length:				36:11

== Box office and reception ==
Only the Strong earned US$3,273,588 at the U.S. box office, making only more than half of its US$6 million budget.

The film was universally panned by critics, earning a 13% approval rating on Rotten Tomatoes based on 15 reviews. Roger Ebert gave the film one out of four stars, saying, "The message of a movie like Only the Strong, building on the fascist undertones of its title, is almost cruel in its stupidity and naivete. It's almost a relief that few people in the audience for such a film ever remember if it even had a message or not". Joe Brown of The Washington Post also wrote a scathing review, saying it "relies slightly less relentlessly on violence for its own sake than most in this genre, but the film is clumsily assembled and edited, heavy on the slow-mo, and its simplistic story plays like 'The Kids From Fame' armed with very sharp knives".
