= Horror Wears Blue =

1987 novel by Lin Carter

- Cover of first edition
- Author: Lin Carter
- Cover artist: Candy Jernigan
- Language: English
- Series: Zarkon series
- Genre: Science fiction
- Publisher: Doubleday
- Publication date: 1987
- Publication place: United States
- Media type: Print (hardcover)
- Pages: 174
- ISBN: 0-385-12504-6
- Preceded by: The Earth-Shaker

Horror Wears Blue is a science fiction novel by American writer Lin Carter, the fifth and last in his "Zarkon, Lord of the Unknown" series. It was first published in hardcover by Doubleday in November 1987. An ebook edition was issued by Thunderchild Publishing in December 2017.

== Summary ==
A warehouse robbery in London perplexes Scotland Yard. The perpetrators, dubbed the "Blue Men," seem impervious to bullets and other conventional weaponry, and are even unaffected by deadly gases. This is merely the first of their brazen crimes; they strike again and again, apparently unstoppable. Called in from Knickerbocker City, Prince Zarkon and his Omega Crew come to the rescue. They discover the mastermind behind the Blue Men is the mad scientist known as Vulture, who clothes them in their impenetrable blue auras.

Outsmarting the protagonists time and again, the Vulture eventually oversteps when he has the Blue Men kidnap Zarkon's associates Scorchy Muldoon and Joey Weston. Turning the tables on him, the Omega Crew succeed in destroying his organization, though the Vulture himself escapes.

== Reception ==
James B. Hemesath feels the book "enjoyable, lightweight reading, ideally suited for a dreary winter weekend," but "[n]evertheless, this is not a novel on which to spend your least $12.95." He calls it "[n]ot without its small pleasures, [with] a nice sense of London and its surrounding countryside." He notes that "[n]ames of characters and bits of humor drawn from pulp-era writing abound for those readers interested in such things," observing that the book title itself "involves a rather clever joke." He also praises the jacket art as "suited to the title and the story," and "above average for Doubleday." Summing up, Hemesath thinks the novel "might be recommended for younger readers as a present-day introduction to the pulp-style storytelling that was so popular in the bygone days ... [b]ut for the rest of us, [it] is at best a passable diversion."

Robert M. Price characterizes the Zarkon series as "five delightful novels ... Lin Carter's loving homage to Doc Savage and his creator Lester Dent." They celebrate "'the gloriously fourth-rate,' the pulps, radio, comics, and movies he loved as a kid." He notes that "[t]he novels manage quite successfully to walk the tightrope between salute and parody," and "the humor never seems to impede or undermine the action." While "[i]t is not difficult to pick out a flaw here and there" and the series is "not entirely free from Carter's later-career sloppiness ... on the whole these books are vastly superior to much of what else he was writing during the same period. The Zarkon novels all command a crisp, snappy prose, sometimes reminiscent of Lester Dent's."

The book was also reviewed by Don D'Ammassa in Science Fiction Chronicle #101, February 1988, and anonymously in Pulp Vault, February 1988.

== Relationship to other works ==
Robert M. Price suggests the author may have lifted the name of the novel's antagonist from the Spider-Man villain of the same name. Carter had written scripts for the Spider-Man animated TV series in the late 1960s.

== Unfinished sequel ==
At the end of the novel, the author announces an upcoming sequel, The Moon Menace, that was never in fact published. According to Robert M. Price, Carter only completed three chapters and a synopsis of the remainder before his untimely passing. It was to feature the Vulture returning to join with Zarkon's recurring foe Lucifer in a plot to take Zarkon captive and divide the world between them. They were ultimately to be thwarted (as in Carter's 1975 Callisto novel Lankar of Callisto) by the actions of a loyal dog.
