= Frankie Pace =

American stand-up comedian and actor

- Born: Italy
- Notable work: Night Flight's "Rick Shaw's Takeout Theater"

Comedy career
- Years active: 1984–present
- Medium: Stand-up comedy, film, television, writing, podcasting
- Genres: Prop comedy; satire; clean comedy
- Subjects: Everyday life; pop culture
- Website: frankiepacecomic.com

Frankie Pace is an American stand-up comedian and actor.

Pace began his career in a Long Island comedy club called "The White House Inn," working alongside Eddie Murphy, Rob Bartlett, Jackie Martling, Bob Nelson, Bob Woods, Richie Minnervini, Rosie O'Donnell, Jim Myers and Don McHenry. After a few years he went to New York City where Rick Newman saw him and passed him as a regular at Catch a Rising Star.

Pace performed on the April 14, 1984, episode of Saturday Night Live which featured George McGovern as the host. Night Flight producer Cynthia Friedman hired Pace to write and host his own branded program for the USA Network counterculture programming block, called "Rick Shaw's Takeout Theater," where Pace would present '70s martial arts movies such as Fury of King Boxer and Shanghai Massacre.

Pace later performed for on The Joan Rivers Show and acted on The Cosby Show and The Sopranos. He also performed shows for Bill Boggs Comedy Tonight, Caroline's Comedy Hour and Comic Strip Live with John Mulrooney.

When the comedy club scene slowed down, Pace revamped his act and looked for work in the Catskill Mountains which later led to corporate shows, casino shows and cruise ship performances. Pace later worked for Freddie Roman's "Catskill's on Broadway."

In 1999, Pace appeared in the David Spade film Lost & Found.

In 2012, Pace launched the podcast The Frankie Pace Show where he interviewed comedians and entertainers.

In 2016, Pace did a comedy sketch parody of a Kiss rocker for Topical Waffle on The Tonight Show's YouTube channel.

Pace also posts comedic doodles entitled "Generations" on social media.
