= Nayantara Sahgal =

Indian writer (born 1927)

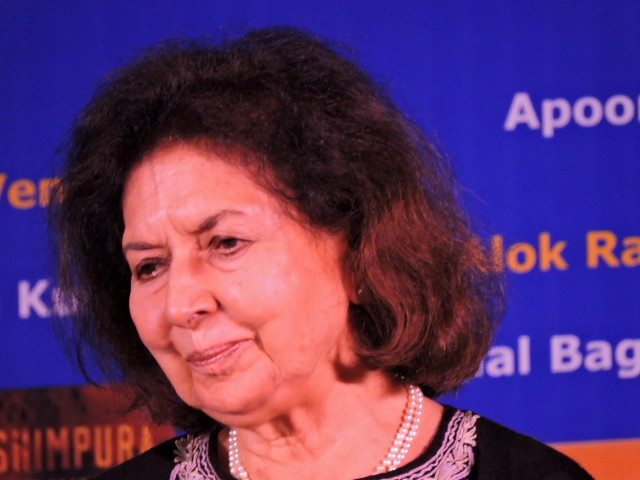
- Sahgal at a press meeting in 2016
- Born: Nayantara Pandit; 10 May 1927 (age 99); Allahabad, United Provinces, British India (present-day Prayagraj, Uttar Pradesh, India)
- Education: Wellesley College
- Occupation: Writer
- Spouses: Gautam Sahgal (m. 1949; div. 1967) Edward Nirmal Mangat Rai (m. 1979; died 2003)
- Children: 2, including Gita Sahgal
- Parent(s): Ranjit Sitaram Pandit (father); Vijaya Lakshmi Pandit (mother)
- Relatives: Jawaharlal Nehru (uncle); Indira Gandhi (cousin)
- Writing career
- Period: 20th century
- Genres: Politics, feminism
- Notable awards: Sahitya Akademi Award (1985)

Nayantara Sahgal (née Pandit; born 10 May 1927) is an Indian writer who writes in English. She is a member of the Nehru–Gandhi family, the second of the three daughters born to Jawaharlal Nehru's sister, Vijaya Lakshmi Pandit.

She was awarded the 1986 Sahitya Akademi Award for her English novel Rich Like Us (1985).

== Early life ==
Sahgal's father Ranjit Sitaram Pandit was a barrister from Kathiawad. Pandit was also a classical scholar who had translated Kalhana's epic history Rajatarangini into English from Sanskrit. He was arrested for his support of Indian independence and died in Lucknow prison jail in 1944, leaving behind his wife (Vijaya Lakshmi Pandit) and their three daughters Chandralekha Mehta, Nayantara Sehgal and Rita Dar.

Sahgal's mother, Vijaya Lakshmi Pandit, was the daughter of Motilal Nehru and sister of India's first prime minister, Jawaharlal Nehru. Vijaya Lakshmi had been active in the Indian freedom struggle, had been to jail for this cause and in 1946, was part of the first team representing newly formed India that went to the then newly formed United Nations, along with M.C.Chagla. After India achieved independence, Vijaya Lakshmi Pandit served as a member of India's Constituent Assembly, the governor of several Indian states, and as India's ambassador to the Soviet Union, the United States, Mexico, the Court of St. James, Ireland, and the United Nations.

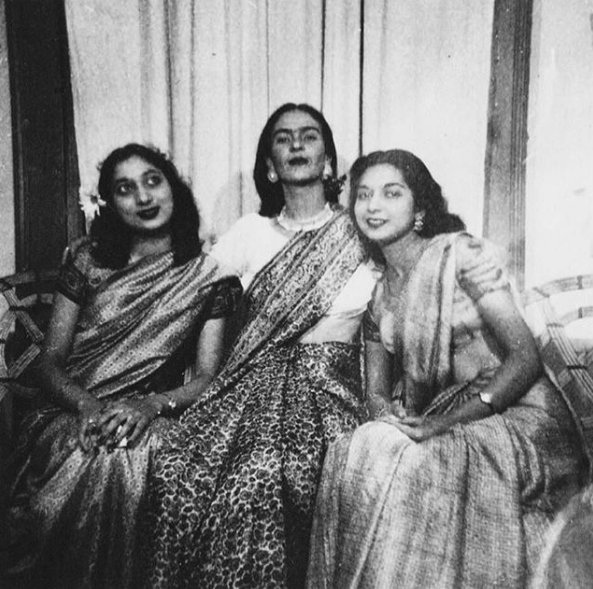
Sahgal (right) with Frida Kahlo (centre) in Mexico City (1947)

Sahgal attended a number of schools as a girl, given the turmoil in the Nehru family during the last years (1935–47) of the Indian freedom struggle. Ultimately, she graduated from Woodstock School in the Himalayan hill station of Mussoorie in 1943 and later in the United States from Wellesley College (BA, 1947), which she attended along with her sister Chandralekha, who graduated 2 years earlier in 1945.

== Marriage and career ==
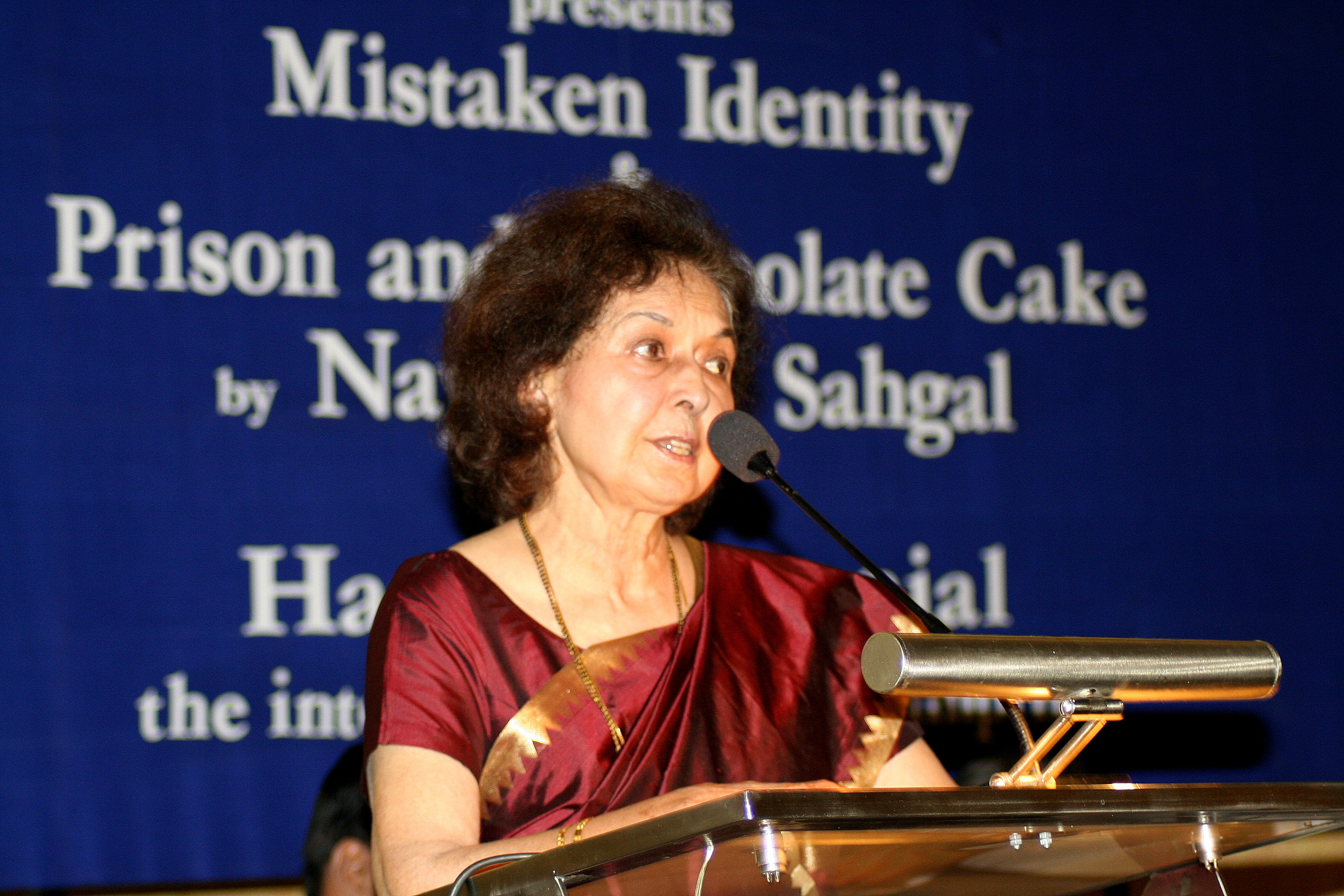
Nayantara Sahgal speaking at the launch of Mistaken Identity by HarperPerennial in Delhi, November 2007

Sahgal has been married twice, first to Gautam Sehgal and later to Edward Nirmal Mangat Rai, a Punjabi Christian who was an Indian Civil Service officer. Though part of the Nehru family, Sahgal developed a reputation for maintaining her independent critical sense. Her independent tone, and her mother's, led to both falling out with her cousin Indira Gandhi during the most autocratic phases of the latter's time in office in the late 1960s and throughout the 1970s. Gandhi cancelled Sahgal's scheduled appointment as India's Ambassador to Italy within days of her return to power. Not one to be intimidated, Sahgal in 1982 wrote Indira Gandhi: Her Road to Power, a scathing and insightful account of Gandhi's rise to power.

Gita Sahgal, the writer and journalist on issues of feminism, fundamentalism, and racism, director of prize-winning documentary films, and human rights activist, is her daughter.

On 6 October 2015, Sahgal returned her Sahitya Akademi Award to protest what she called "increasing intolerance and supporting right to dissent in the country", following the murders of rationalists Govind Pansare, Narendra Dabholkar and M. M. Kalburgi, and the Dadri mob lynching incident; for this she was praised in 2017 by Karima Bennoune, United Nations monitor for cultural rights. In September 2018 she was elected as a Vice President of PEN International.

== Bibliography ==
- Prison and Chocolate Cake (memoir; 1954)
- A Time to Be Happy (novel; 1958)
- From Fear Set Free (memoir; 1963)
- This Time of Morning (novel; 1965)
- Storm in Chandigarh (novel; 1969)
- The Freedom Movement in India (1970)
- Sunlight Surrounds You (novel; 1970) (with Chandralekha Mehta and Rita Dar i.e. her two sisters; this was the daughters' tribute to their mother)
- The Day in Shadow (novel; 1971)
- A Voice for Freedom (1977)
- Indira Gandhi's Emergence and Style (1978)
- Indira Gandhi: Her Road to Power (novel; 1982)
- Plans for Departure (novel; 1985)
- Rich Like Us (novel; 1985)
- Mistaken Identity (novel; 1988)
- A Situation in New Delhi (novel; 1989)
- Point of View: A Personal Response to Life, Literature, and Politics (1997)
- Lesser Breeds (novel; 2003)
- Relationship (collection of letters exchanged between Nayantara Sahgal and E.N.Mangat Rai;1994)
- Before freedom: Nehru's letters to his sister 1909-1947 (edited by Nayantara Sahgal)
- When the Moon Shines by Day (novel, 2017)
- The Fate of Butterflies (novella; 2019)

== See also ==
- Nehru-Gandhi family
- Political families of India
