= Music in Twelve Parts =

Twelve pieces by Philip Glass

Music in Twelve Parts is a set of twelve pieces written between 1971 and 1974 by the composer Philip Glass.

This work cycle was originally scored for ten instruments, played by five musicians: three electric organs, two flutes, four saxophones (two soprano, one alto, one tenor) and one female voice. Only the organ can be heard throughout; the other instruments are not playing simultaneously the whole time. Only one piece was originally written, which was called "Music in Twelve Parts" because it was originally intended to have twelve lines of counterpoint harmony, but when Glass played it to a friend, she asked him what the other eleven parts would be like. He found the misunderstanding interesting, and wrote another eleven parts over a period of three years. The entire set can be over three hours long when performed. In these works, Glass uses repetitive structures often associated with musical minimalism. Despite this, many of the works display a great deal of variety and invention. The music develops slowly, and there are long periods during which a casual listener would not notice any change. If one listens closely, however, this is seen to be an illusion, since patterns actually change form almost continuously, though nearly imperceptibly. The pieces are therefore challenging to the listener, but they have still enjoyed a significant level of popularity and are often cited as a major work of the second half of the 20th century. The works show a great emphasis on development and slow alteration, with different pieces using different techniques for development.

Andrew Porter for The New Yorker magazine (1978) wrote of the transitions from one track to the next:

A new sound and a new chord suddenly break in, with an effect as if one wall of a room has suddenly disappeared, to reveal a completely new view.

Glass uses a 12-tone row in Part 12 of this work.

== Recording/performance history ==
The work has been recorded three times: first for Virgin (1974 (vinyl) 1990 (complete recording on CD, completed 1988)), later for Nonesuch in 1993, and for Orange Mountain Music in 2007.

On Monday 1 May 2017, the work was performed at the Barbican Hall in London, England, UK, by a group of musicians assembled and led by keyboard player James McVinnie, the first time the work had been performed live other than by the Philip Glass Ensemble.
