= Charter pour l'enfer =

- Directed by: Jean-Pierre Moscardo
- Distributed by: France 2
- Release date: 19 February 1981
- Country: France

Charter pour l'enfer (also known as Charters to Hell) is a 1981 French documentary film directed by Jean-Pierre Moscardo. The film depicts the lives of heroin addicts in Asia, filmed in three of the major international heroin trade centers: France, Thailand, and India.

== Awards ==
Year	Award	Category	Result
1981	9th International Emmy Awards	Best Documentary	Won
