= Jawaharlal Nehru =

Prime Minister of India from 1947 to 1964

Pandit Jawaharlal Nehru
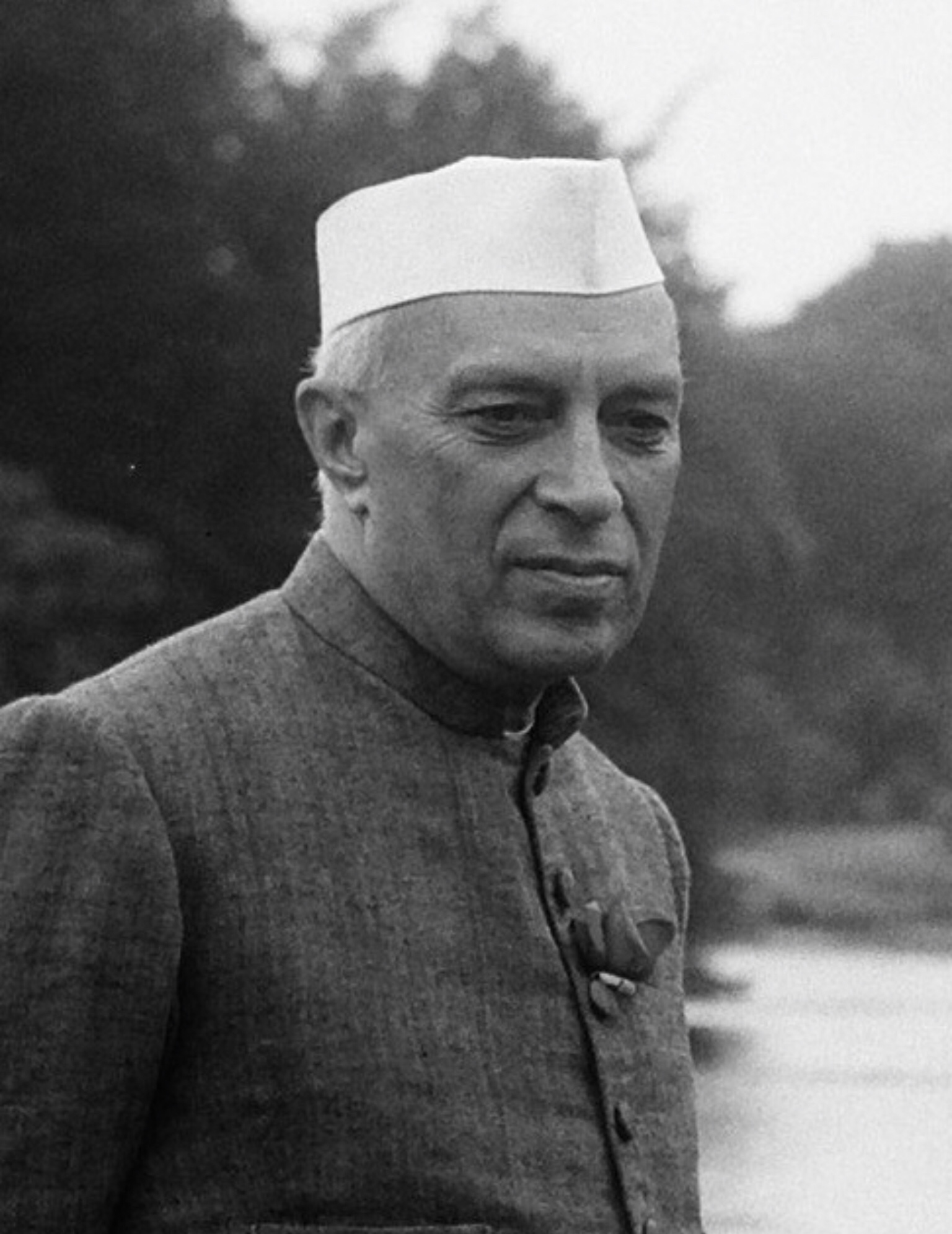
- Nehru in the Netherlands, 1957

Prime Minister of India
- In office 15 August 1947 – 27 May 1964
- Monarch: George VI
- President: Rajendra Prasad; Sarvepalli Radhakrishnan
- Governors General: Lord Mountbatten; C. Rajagopalachari
- Vice President: Sarvepalli Radhakrishnan; Zakir Husain
- Deputy: Vallabhbhai Patel (until 1950)
- Preceded by: Office established
- Succeeded by: Gulzarilal Nanda (acting); Lal Bahadur Shastri

Union Minister of External Affairs
- In office 2 September 1946 – 27 May 1964
- Prime Minister: Himself
- Preceded by: Office established
- Succeeded by: Gulzarilal Nanda

Head of the Interim Government of India
- In office 2 September 1946 – 15 August 1947
- Governors General: Earl Wavell; Lord Mountbatten

Member of Parliament, Lok Sabha
- In office 17 April 1952 – 27 May 1964
- Preceded by: Constituency established
- Succeeded by: Vijaya Lakshmi Pandit
- Constituency: Phulpur, Uttar Pradesh

Personal details
- Born: 14 November 1889 Allahabad, North-Western Provinces, British India
- Died: 27 May 1964 (aged 74) New Delhi, India
- Resting place: Shantivan
- Party: Indian National Congress
- Spouse: Kamala Kaul (m. 1916; died 1936)
- Children: Indira Gandhi
- Parents: Motilal Nehru; Swarup Rani Nehru
- Relatives: Nehru–Gandhi family
- Education: Harrow School; Trinity College, Cambridge; Inner Temple
- Occupation: Lawyer; Politician
- Awards: See below
- Nehru's voice Tryst with Destiny speech delivered on the eve of India's independence Recorded 14 August 1947

Jawaharlal Nehru (Note: /dʒəˈwɑːhərlɑːl ˈneɪru/ jə-WAH-her-lahl NAY-roo or /ˈnɛru/ NERR-oo, Hindi: जवाहरलाल नेहरू, romanized: Javāharlāl Nehrū; IPA: [dʒəˌʋaːɦəɾˈlaːl ˈneːɦɾuː]) (14 November 1889 – 27 May 1964) was an Indian lawyer, anti-colonial nationalist, secular humanist, social democrat, and statesman who was a central figure in India during the middle of the 20th century. Nehru was a principal leader of the Indian nationalist movement in the 1930s and 1940s. Upon India's independence in 1947, he served as the country's first prime minister, holding office for 16 years and 286 days. Nehru promoted parliamentary democracy, secularism, and science and technology during the 1950s, powerfully influencing India's arc as a modern nation. In international affairs, he steered India clear of the two blocs of the Cold War. A well-regarded author, he wrote books such as Letters from a Father to His Daughter (1929), An Autobiography (1936) and The Discovery of India (1946), that have been read around the world.

The son of Motilal Nehru, a prominent lawyer and Indian nationalist, Jawaharlal Nehru was educated in England—at Harrow School and Trinity College, Cambridge, and trained in the law at the Inner Temple. He became a barrister, returned to India, enrolled at the Allahabad High Court and gradually became interested in national politics, which eventually became a full-time occupation. He joined the Indian National Congress, rose to become the leader of a progressive faction during the 1920s, and eventually of the Congress, receiving the support of Mahatma Gandhi, who was to designate Nehru as his political heir. As Congress president in 1929, Nehru called for complete independence from the British Raj.

Nehru promoted the idea of the secular nation-state in the 1937 provincial elections, allowing the Congress to sweep the elections and form governments in several provinces. (Note: ... he told his colleagues that the provincial elections, scheduled for the following year in accordance with the 1935 Act, would be fought on a radical socio-economic programme, which he confidently expected to carry the country. ... It was with this radical programme that Nehru and his colleagues overwhelmed the Muslim League and other parties in the 1937 provincial elections; the League gained but a quarter of seats reserved for Muslims, while the rest went to Congress candidates. It seemed a spectacular demonstration of the power of a secular, socialist and internationalist Congress over any of the narrowly defined alternatives, including the Gandhian programme. All acknowledged the highly successful electoral attraction of Nehru.) In September 1939, the Congress ministries resigned to protest Viceroy Lord Linlithgow's decision to join the war without consulting them. After the All India Congress Committee's Quit India Resolution of 8 August 1942, senior Congress leaders were imprisoned, and for a time, the organisation was suppressed. Nehru, who had reluctantly heeded Gandhi's call for immediate independence, and had desired instead to support the Allied war effort during World War II, came out of a lengthy prison term to a much altered political landscape. Under Muhammad Ali Jinnah, the Muslim League had come to dominate Muslim politics in the interim. In the 1946 provincial elections, Congress won the elections, but the League won all the seats reserved for Muslims, which the British interpreted as a clear mandate for Pakistan in some form. Nehru became the interim prime minister of India in September 1946 and the League joined his government with some hesitancy in October 1946.

Upon India's independence on 15 August 1947, Nehru gave a critically acclaimed speech, "Tryst with Destiny"; he was sworn in as the Dominion of India's prime minister and raised the Indian flag at the Red Fort in Delhi. On 26 January 1950, when India became a republic within the Commonwealth of Nations, Nehru became the Republic of India's first prime minister. He embarked on an ambitious economic, social, and political reform programme. Nehru promoted a pluralistic multi-party democracy. In foreign affairs, he led the establishment of the Non-Aligned Movement, a group of nations that did not seek membership in the two main ideological blocs of the Cold War. Under Nehru's leadership, the Congress dominated national and state-level politics and won elections in 1951, 1957 and 1962. He died in office from a heart attack in 1964. His birthday is celebrated as Children's Day in India.

== Early life and career (1889–1912) ==
=== Birth and family background ===
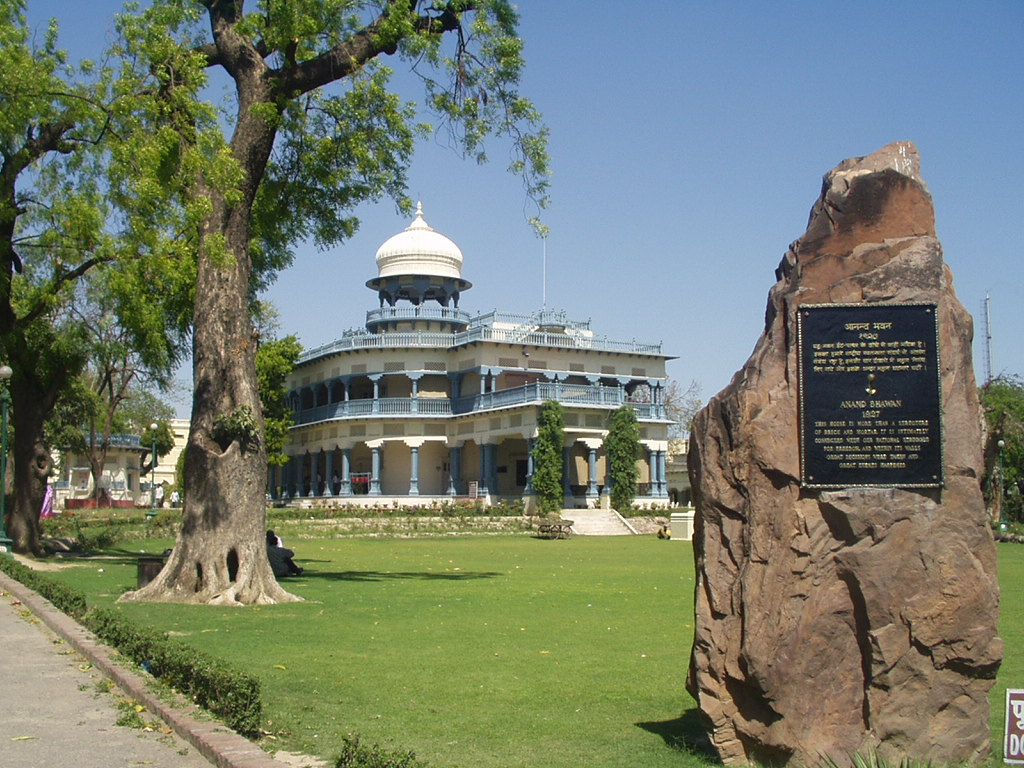
Anand Bhawan the Nehru family home in Allahabad

Jawaharlal Nehru was born on 14 November 1889 in Allahabad in British India to mother Swarup Rani née Thussu (1868–1938) and father Motilal Nehru (1861–1931). Both parents belonged to the community of Kashmiri Pandits, or Brahmins originally from the Kashmir valley. Motilal, a self-made barrister of wealth, served as president of the Indian National Congress in 1919 and 1928. Swarup Rani, raised in a family settled in Lahore, was Motilal's second wife, the first having died in childbirth. Jawaharlal was the firstborn. Two sisters followed, the elder of which, Vijaya Lakshmi, became the first female president of the United Nations General Assembly. The younger, Krishna Hutheesing, became a noted writer, authoring several books on her brother.

=== Childhood ===
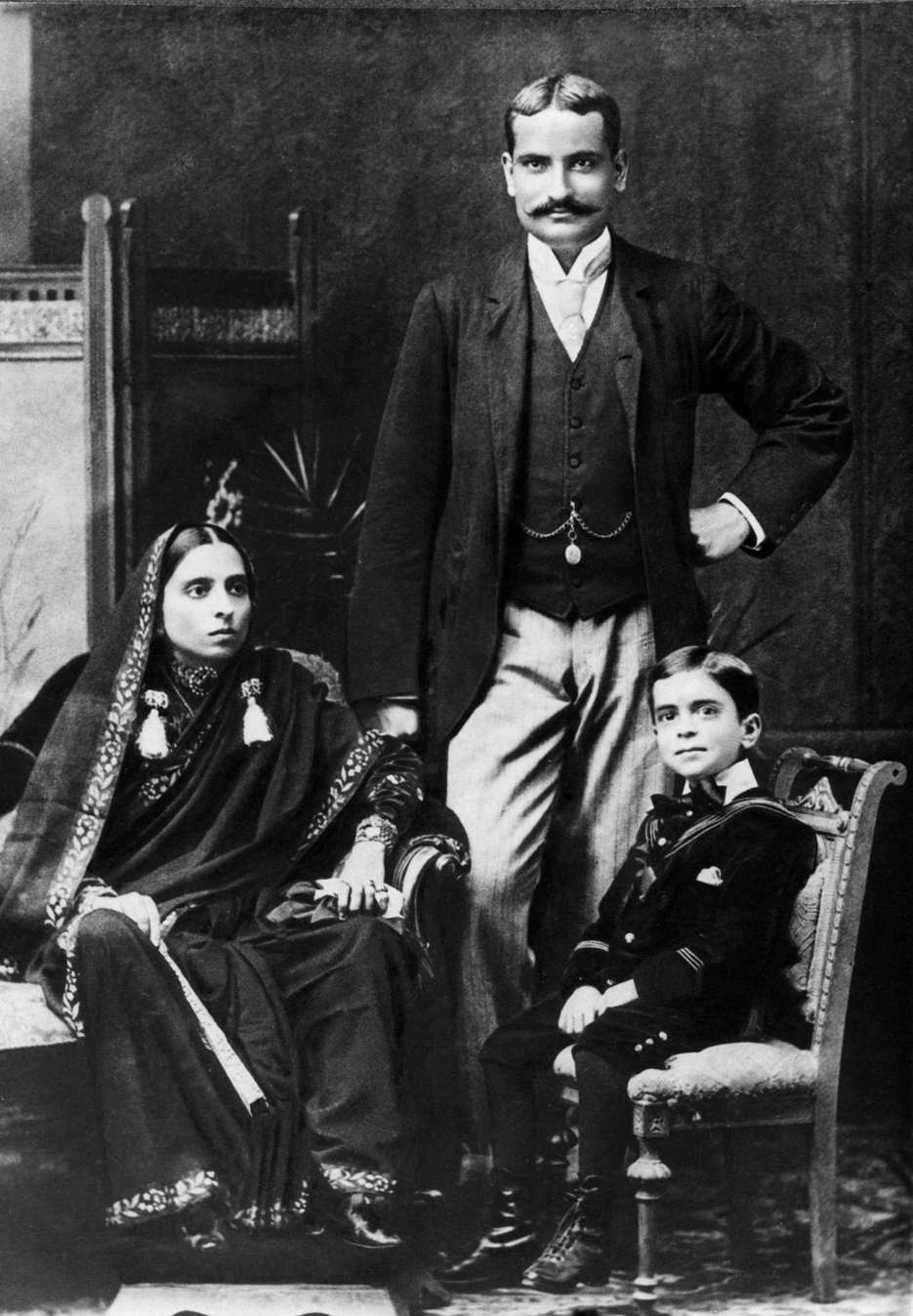
Jawaharlal Nehru as a child with his mother Swarup Rani and father Motilal Nehru, 1894.

Nehru described his childhood as "sheltered and uneventful". He grew up in an atmosphere of privilege, which included life in the mansion Anand Bhavan in Allahabad. He was educated at home by private governesses and tutors. One of these was an Irishman, Ferdinand T. Brooks, who was interested in theosophy. The Irish Home Rule and Indian Home Rule leaguer Annie Besant initiated Jawaharlal into the Theosophical Society when he was thirteen. However, his interest in theosophy was not enduring, and he left the society shortly after Brooks departed as his tutor. Nehru was to write: "For nearly three years [Brooks] was with me and in many ways, he influenced me greatly".

Nehru's theosophical interests led him to study the Buddhist and Hindu scriptures. According to B. R. Nanda, these scriptures were Nehru's "first introduction to the religious and cultural heritage of [India]....[They] provided Nehru the initial impulse for [his] long intellectual quest which culminated...in The Discovery of India."

=== Youth ===
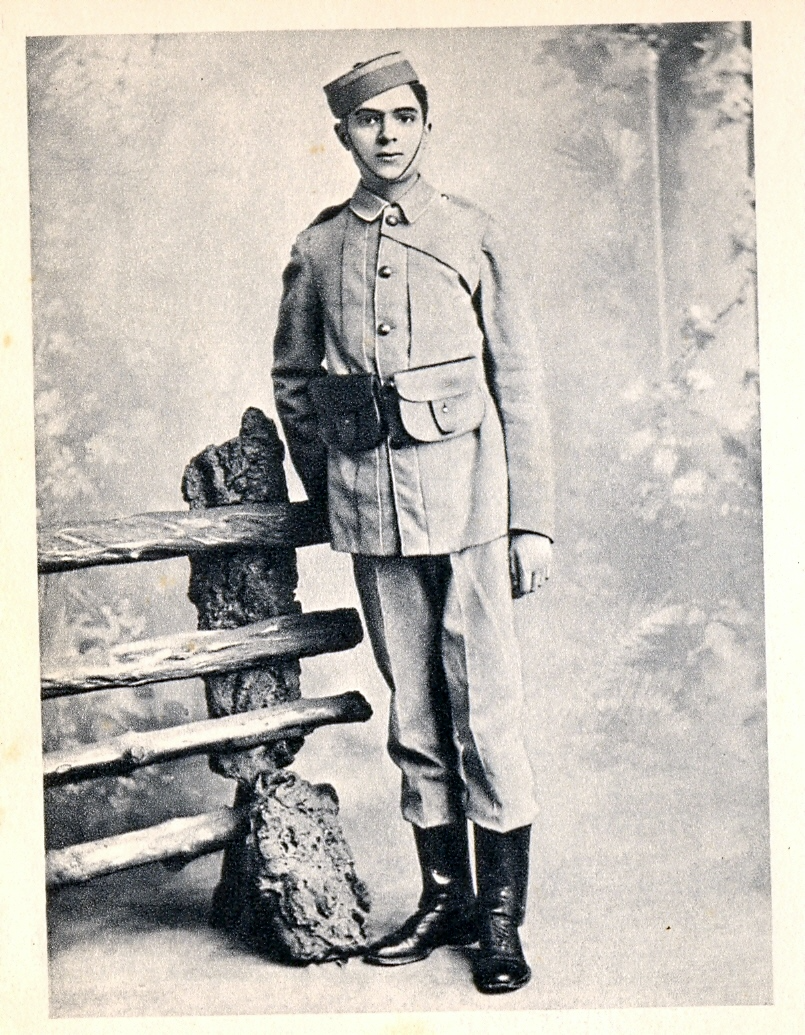
A young Nehru dressed in a cadet's uniform at Harrow School in England

Nehru became an ardent nationalist during his youth. The Second Boer War and the Russo-Japanese War intensified his feelings. Of the latter he wrote, "[The] Japanese victories [had] stirred up my enthusiasm. ...Nationalistic ideas filled my mind. ... I mused of Indian freedom and Asiatic freedom from the thraldom of Europe." Later, in 1905, when he had begun his institutional schooling at Harrow, a leading school in England where he was nicknamed "Joe", G. M. Trevelyan's Garibaldi books, which he had received as prizes for academic merit, influenced him greatly. He viewed Garibaldi as a revolutionary hero. He wrote: "Visions of similar deeds in India came before, of [my] gallant fight for [Indian] freedom and in my mind, India and Italy got strangely mixed together."

=== Graduation ===
Nehru went to Trinity College, Cambridge, in October 1907 and graduated with an honours degree in natural science in 1910. During this period, he studied politics, economics, history and literature with interest. The writings of Bernard Shaw, H. G. Wells, John Maynard Keynes, Bertrand Russell, Lowes Dickinson and Meredith Townsend moulded much of his political and economic thinking.

After completing his degree in 1910, Nehru moved to London and studied law at the Inner Temple (one of the four Inns of Court to which English barristers must belong). During this time, he continued to study Fabian Society scholars including Beatrice Webb. He was called to the Bar in 1912.

=== Legal practice ===
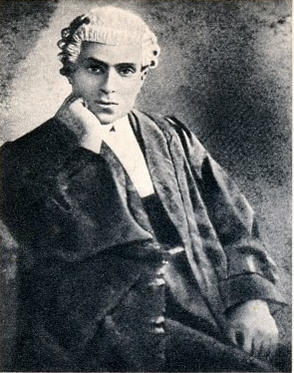
Jawaharlal Nehru, Barrister-at-Law

After returning to India in August 1912, Nehru enrolled at the Allahabad High Court and tried to settle down as a barrister. His father was one of the wealthiest barristers in British India, with a monthly income exceeding Indian rupees 10,000 (£850). Although Nehru was expected to inherit the family's lucrative practice, he had little interest in his profession, and relished neither the practice of law nor the company of lawyers. His involvement in nationalist politics was to gradually replace his legal practice. In 1945–46, he was a member of the INA Defence Committee during the INA Trials, putting on a barrister's gown and appearing in court after over twenty-five years.

== Nationalist movement (1912–1939) ==
=== Civil rights and home rule: 1912–1919 ===
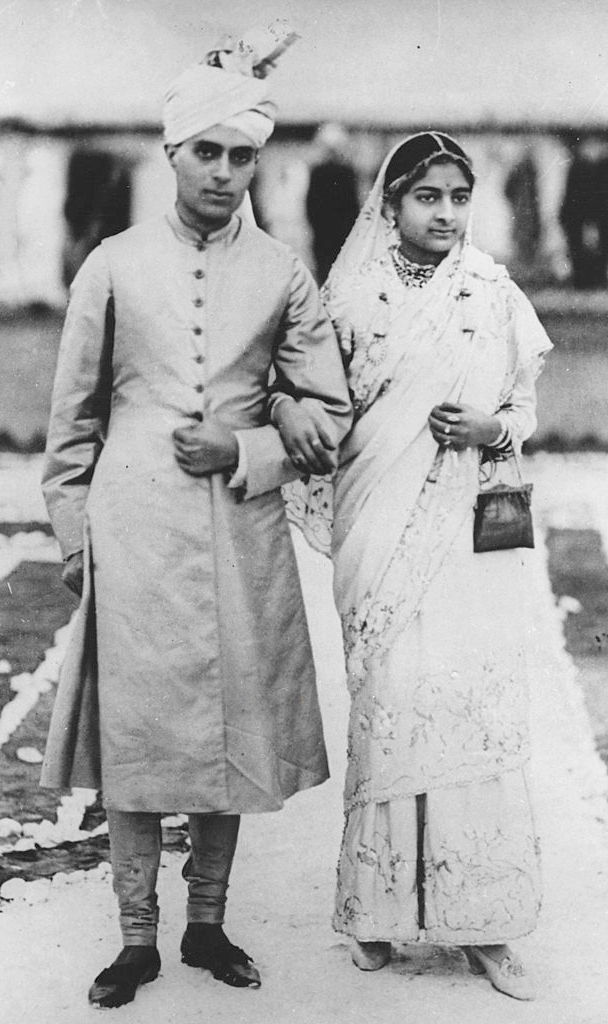
Nehru and Kamala Kaul at their wedding in Delhi, 1916

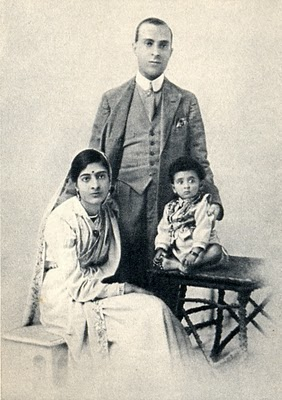
Nehru in 1919 with wife Kamala and daughter Indira

Nehru's father, Motilal, was an important moderate leader of the Indian National Congress. The moderates believed British rule was modernising, and sought reform and more participation in government in cooperation with British authorities. However, Nehru sympathised with the Congress radicals, who promoted Swaraj, Swadesh, and boycott. The two factions had split in 1907. After returning to India in 1912, Nehru attended the annual session of the Congress at Patna. The Congress was then considered a party of moderates and elites dominated by Gopal Krishna Gokhale, and Nehru was disconcerted by what he saw as "very much an English-knowing upper-class affair". However, Nehru agreed to raise funds for the ongoing Indian civil rights movement led by Mahatma Gandhi in South Africa.

In 1916, Nehru married Kamala Kaul, who came from a Kashmiri Pandit family settled in Delhi. Their only daughter, Indira, was born in 1917 and would go on to become India's first and, to date, only woman Prime Minister, serving from 1966–1977 and again from 1980–1984. Kamala gave birth to a son in 1924, but the baby lived for only a few days.

The influence of moderates declined after Gokhale died in 1915. Several nationalist leaders banded together in 1916 under the leadership of Annie Besant and Bal Gangadhar Tilak to voice a demand for Swaraj or self-governance. Besant and Tilak formed separate Home Rule Leagues. Nehru joined both groups, but he worked primarily with Besant, with whom he had a close relationship since childhood. He became the secretary of Besant's Home Rule League. In June 1917, the British government arrested Besant. The Congress and other organisations threatened to launch protests if she was not freed. The government was forced to release Besant in September, but the protestors successfully negotiated further concessions.

=== Non-cooperation and afterwards: 1919–1929 ===
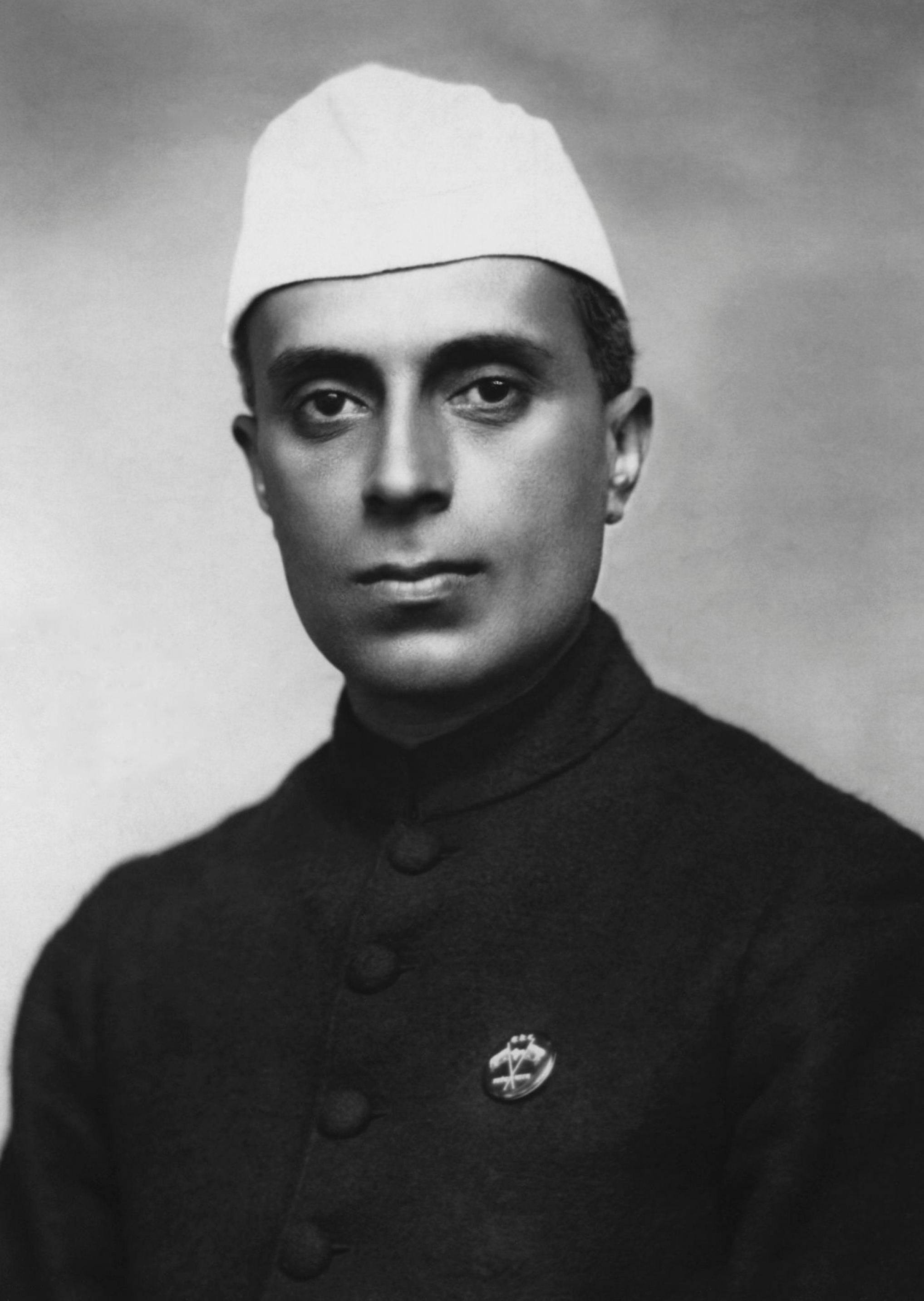
Jawaharlal Nehru, circa 1925

Nehru met Gandhi for the first time in 1916 at the Lucknow session of the Congress, but he had been then dissuaded by his father from being drawn into Gandhi's satyagraha politics. 1919 marked the beginning of a strong wave of nationalist activity and subsequent government repression that included the Jallianwala Bagh killings. Motilal Nehru lost his belief in constitutional reform, and joined his son in accepting Gandhi's methods and paramount leadership of the Congress. In December 1919, Nehru's father was elected president of the Indian National Congress in what is regarded as "the first Gandhi Congress". During the non-cooperation movement launched by Gandhi in 1920, Nehru played an influential role in directing political activities in the United Provinces (now Uttar Pradesh) as provincial Congress secretary. He was imprisoned on 6 December 1921 on charges of anti-governmental activities, marking the first of eight periods of detention between 1921 and 1945, lasting over nine years in all. In 1923, Nehru was imprisoned in Nabha, a princely state, when he went there to see the struggle that was being waged by the Sikhs against the corrupt Mahants. He was released after his sentence was unconditionally suspended by the British administration under the criminal procedure code. By 1923, Nehru had emerged as a national figure of some stature. He was elected general secretary of the Congress, president of the United Provinces Congress, and mayor of Allahabad all in the same year.

The non-cooperation movement was halted in 1922 as a result of the Chauri Chaura incident. Nehru's two-year term as general secretary ended after 1925, and earlier that year he resigned as mayor of Allahabad due to his disillusionment with municipal politics. In 1926, Nehru left for Europe with his wife and daughter to seek treatment for his wife's tuberculosis diagnosis. While in Europe, he was invited to attend the Congress of oppressed nationalities in Brussels, Belgium. The meeting was called to coordinate and plan a common struggle against imperialism. Nehru represented India and was elected to the Executive Council of the League against Imperialism which was born at this meeting. He made a statement in favour of complete independence for India. Nehru's stay in Europe included a visit to the Soviet Union, which sparked his interest in Marxism and socialism. Appealed by its ideas but repelled by some of its tactics, he never completely agreed with Karl Marx's ideas. However, from that time on, the benchmark of his economic view remained Marxist, adapted, where necessary, to Indian circumstances. After returning to India in December 1927, Nehru was elected to another two-year term as Congress general secretary.

=== Declaration of independence ===
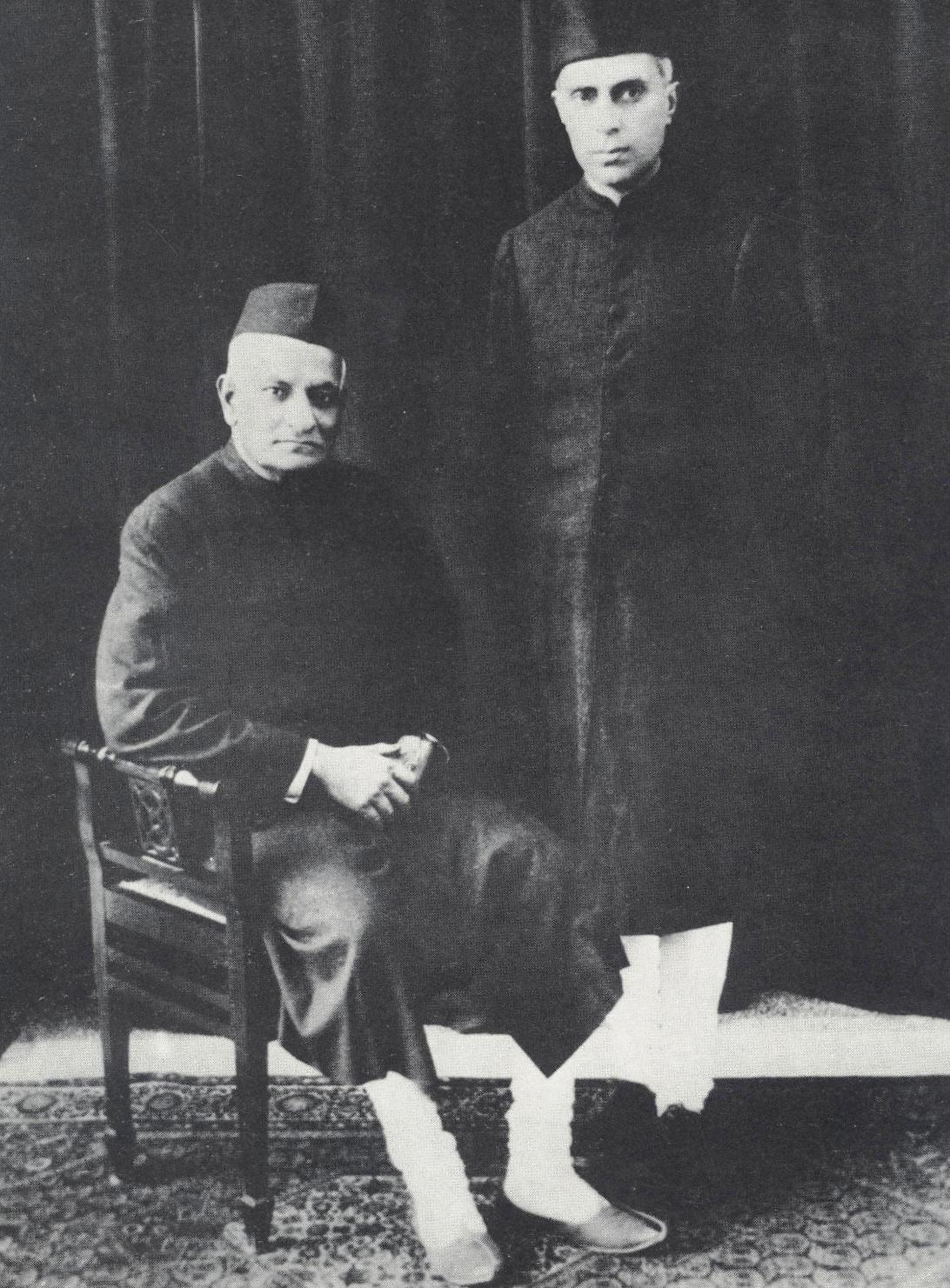
Nehru, President-elect of the Lahore session of the Indian National Congress in 1929, with the outgoing President, his father Motilal

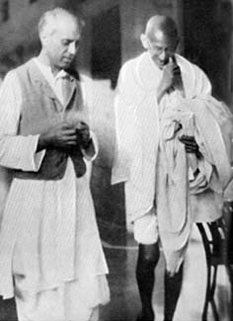
Nehru and Mahatma Gandhi in 1929

Nehru was one of the first leaders to demand that the Congress Party should resolve to make a complete and explicit break from all ties with the British Empire. The Madras session of Congress in 1927, approved his resolution for independence despite Gandhi's criticism. At that time, he formed the Independence for India League, a pressure group within the Congress. In 1928, Gandhi agreed to Nehru's demands and proposed a resolution that called for the British to grant Dominion status to India within two years. If the British failed to meet the deadline, the Congress would call upon all Indians to fight for complete independence. Nehru was one of the leaders who objected to the time given to the British—he pressed Gandhi to demand immediate actions from the British. Gandhi brokered a further compromise by reducing the time given from two years to one. The British rejected demands for Dominion status in 1929. Nehru assumed the presidency of the Congress party during the Lahore session on 29 December 1929 and introduced a successful resolution calling for complete independence. Nehru drafted the Indian Declaration of Independence, which stated:

We believe that it is the inalienable right of the Indian people, as of any other people, to have freedom and to enjoy the fruits of their toil and have the necessities of life, so that they may have full opportunities for growth. We believe also that if any government deprives a people of these rights and oppresses them the people have a further right to alter it or abolish it. The British government in India has not only deprived the Indian people of their freedom but has based itself on the exploitation of the masses, and has ruined India economically, politically, culturally, and spiritually. We believe, therefore, that India must sever the British connection and attain Purna Swaraj or complete independence.

At midnight on New Year's Eve 1929, Nehru hoisted the tricolour flag of India upon the banks of the Ravi in Lahore. A pledge of independence was read out, which included a readiness to withhold taxes. The massive gathering of the public attending the ceremony was asked if they agreed with it, and the majority of people were witnessed raising their hands in approval. 172 Indian members of central and provincial legislatures resigned in support of the resolution and in accordance with Indian public sentiment. The Congress asked the people of India to observe 26 January as Independence Day. Congress volunteers, nationalists, and the public hoisted the flag of India publicly across India. Plans for mass civil disobedience were also underway.

After the Lahore session of the Congress in 1929, Nehru gradually emerged as the paramount leader of the Indian independence movement. Gandhi stepped back into a more spiritual role. Although Gandhi did not explicitly designate Nehru as his political heir until 1942, as early as the mid-1930s, the country saw Nehru as the natural successor to Gandhi. In 1929, Nehru had already drafted the "Fundamental Rights and Economic Policy" resolution that set the government agenda for an independent India. The resolution was ratified in 1931 at the Karachi session chaired by Vallabhbhai Patel.

=== Salt March: 1930 ===
Nehru and most of the Congress leaders were ambivalent initially to Gandhi's plan to begin civil disobedience with a satyagraha aimed at the British salt tax. After the protest had gathered steam, they realised the power of salt as a symbol. Nehru remarked about the unprecedented popular response, "It seemed as though a spring had been suddenly released". He was arrested on 14 April 1930 while on a train from Allahabad to Raipur. Earlier, after addressing a huge meeting and leading a vast procession, he had ceremoniously manufactured some contraband salt. He was charged with breach of the salt law and sentenced to six months of imprisonment at Central Jail.

He nominated Gandhi to succeed him as the Congress president during his absence in jail, but Gandhi declined, and Nehru nominated his father as his successor. With Nehru's arrest, the civil disobedience acquired a new tempo, and arrests, firing on crowds and lathi charges grew to be ordinary occurrences.

==== Salt satyagraha success ====
The salt satyagraha ("pressure for reform through passive resistance") succeeded in attracting world attention. Indian, British, and world opinion increasingly recognised the legitimacy of the claims by the Congress party for independence. Nehru considered the salt satyagraha the high-water mark of his association with Gandhi, and felt its lasting importance was in changing the attitudes of Indians:

Of course these movements exercised tremendous pressure on the British Government and shook the government machinery. But the real importance, to my mind, lay in the effect they had on our own people, and especially the village masses. ... Non-cooperation dragged them out of the mire and gave them self-respect and self-reliance. ... They acted courageously and did not submit so easily to unjust oppression; their outlook widened and they began to think a little in terms of India as a whole. ... It was a remarkable transformation and the Congress, under Gandhi's leadership, must have the credit for it.

=== In prison 1930–1935 ===
On 11 October 1930, Nehru's detention ended, but he was back in jail in less than ten days for resuming the presidency of the banned Congress. On 26 January 1931, Nehru and other prisoners were released early by Lord Irwin, who was negotiating with Gandhi. His father died on 6 February 1931. Nehru was back in jail on 26 December 1931 after violating court orders not to leave Allahabad while leading a "no-rent" campaign to alleviate peasant distress. On 30 August 1933, Nehru was released from prison, but the government soon moved to detain him again. On 22 December 1933, the Home Secretary sent a memo to all local governments in India:

The Government of India regard him [Nehru] as by far the most dangerous element at large in India, and their view is that the time has come, in accordance with their general policy of taking steps at an early stage to prevent attempts to work up mass agitation, to take action against him.

He was arrested in Allahabad on 12 January 1934. In August 1934, he was briefly released for eleven days to attend to his wife's ailing health. In October, he was allowed to see her again, but he turned down an early release conditional on withdrawing from politics for the duration of his sentence.

=== Congress president, provincial elections: 1935–1939 ===
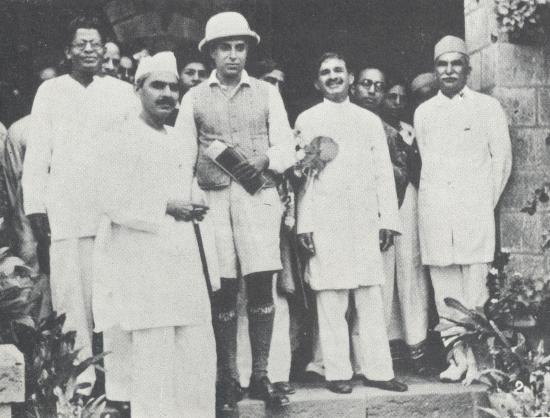
Nehru in Karachi after returning from Lausanne, Switzerland with the ashes of his wife Kamala Nehru in March 1936

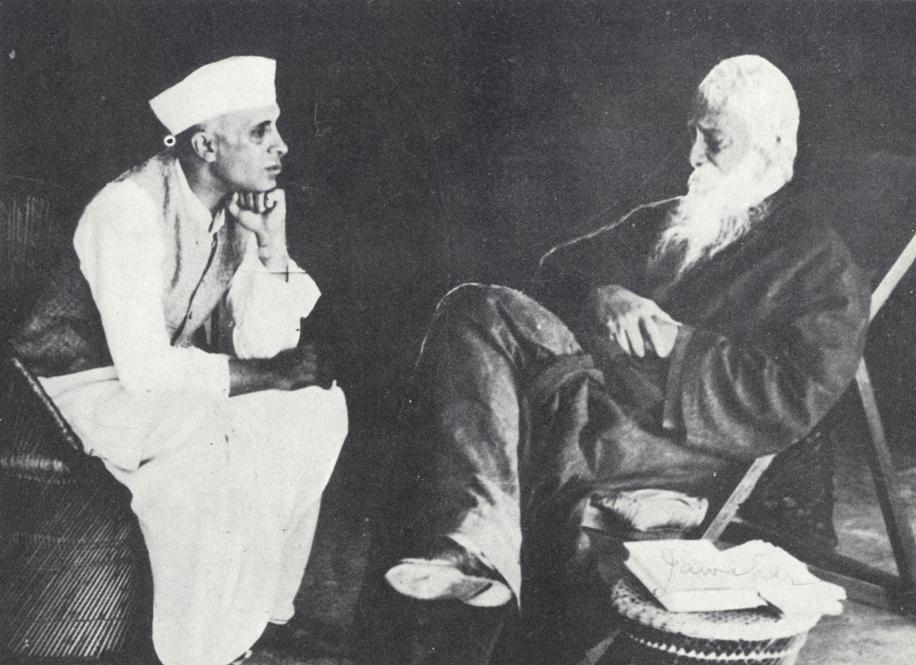
Nehru with Indian Nobel Prize-winning poet Rabindranath Tagore in 1936

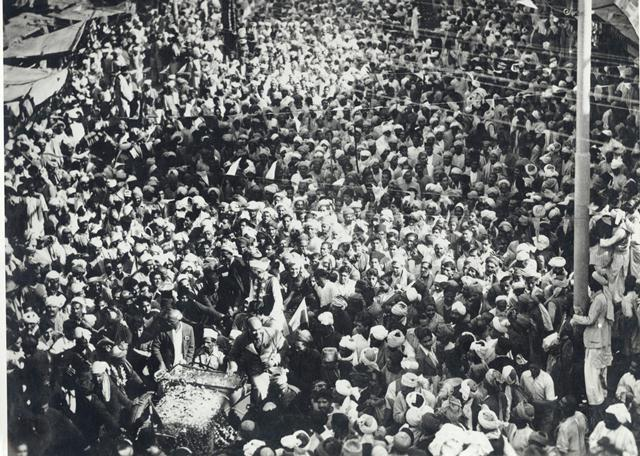
Nehru in a procession at Peshawar, North-West Frontier Province, 14 October 1937

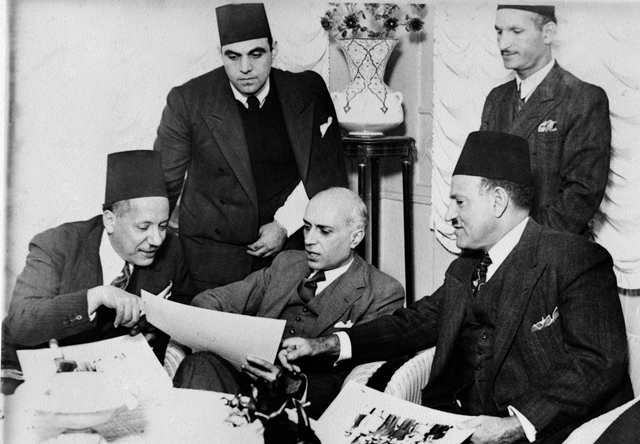
Nehru on a visit to Egypt in June 1938

In September 1935, Nehru's wife, Kamala, became terminally ill while receiving medical treatment in Badenweiler, Germany. Nehru was released from prison early on compassionate grounds, and moved his wife to a sanatorium in Lausanne, Switzerland, where she died on 28 February 1936. While in Europe, Nehru learned that he was elected as Congress president for the coming year. He returned to India in March 1936 and led the Congress response to the Government of India Act 1935. He condemned the Act as a "new charter of bondage" and a "machine with strong brakes but no engine". He initially wanted to boycott the 1937 provincial elections, but agreed to lead the election campaign after receiving vague assurances about abstentionism from the party leaders who wished to contest. Nehru hoped to treat the election campaign as a mass outreach programme.

During the campaign, Nehru was elected to another term as Congress president. The election manifesto, drafted largely by Nehru, attacked both the Act and the Communal Award that went with it. He campaigned against the Muslim League, and argued that Muslims could not be regarded as a separate nation. The Congress won most general seats, and the Muslim League fared poorly with Muslim electorates. After the elections, Nehru drafted a resolution against taking office, but there were many Congress leaders who wanted to assume power under the 1935 Act. The Congress Working Committee (CWC) under Gandhi passed a compromise resolution that authorised office acceptance, but reiterated that the fundamental objective of the Congress was the destruction of the 1935 Act.

Nehru was more popular than before with the public, but he found himself isolated at the CWC meetings due to the anti-socialist orientation of its membership. Gandhi had to personally intervene when a group of CWC members and Nehru threatened to resign and counter-resign their posts over disagreements. He became discontented with his role, especially after the death of his mother in January 1938. In February 1938, he did not stand for re-election as president, and was succeeded by Subash Chandra Bose. He left for Europe in June, stopping on the way at Alexandria, Egypt. While in Europe, Nehru became concerned with the possibility of another world war. At that time, he emphasised that, in the event of war, India's place was alongside the democracies, though he insisted India could only fight in support of Great Britain and France as a free country. After returning to India in December 1938, Nehru accepted Bose's offer to head the Planning Commission. In February 1939, he became president of the All India States Peoples Conference (AISPC), which was leading popular agitations in princely states. Nehru was not directly involved in the events that split the Congress during the Bose presidency, and unsuccessfully attempted to mediate.

== Nationalist movement (1939–1947) ==
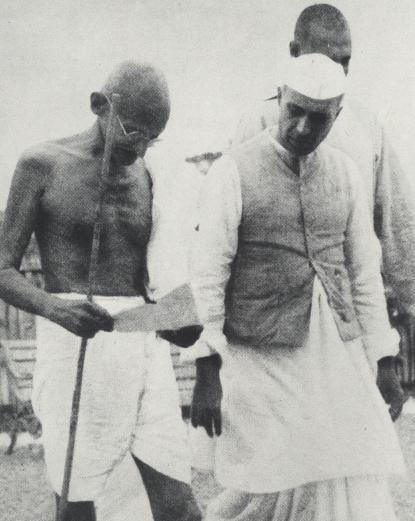
Gandhi, Nehru, and Khan Abdul Ghaffar Khan at the Congress Working Committee meeting in Wardha in September 1939

When World War II began, Viceroy Linlithgow unilaterally declared India a belligerent on the side of Britain, without consulting the elected Indian representatives. Nehru hurried back from a visit to China, announcing that, in a conflict between democracy and fascism, "our sympathies must inevitably be on the side of democracy, ... I should like India to play its full part and throw all her resources into the struggle for a new order".

After much deliberation, the Congress under Nehru informed the government that it would co-operate with the British but on certain conditions. First, Britain must give an assurance of full independence for India after the war and allow the election of a constituent assembly to frame a new constitution; second, although the Indian armed forces would remain under the British Commander-in-chief, Indians must be included immediately in the central government and given a chance to share power and responsibility. When Nehru presented Lord Linlithgow with these demands, he chose to reject them. A deadlock was reached: "The same old game is played again," Nehru wrote bitterly to Gandhi, "the background is the same, the various epithets are the same and the actors are the same and the results must be the same".

On 23 October 1939, the Congress condemned the Viceroy's attitude and called upon the Congress ministries in the various provinces to resign in protest. Before this crucial announcement, Nehru urged Jinnah and the Muslim League to join the protest, but Jinnah declined.

=== Civil disobedience, Lahore Resolution, August Offer: 1940 ===
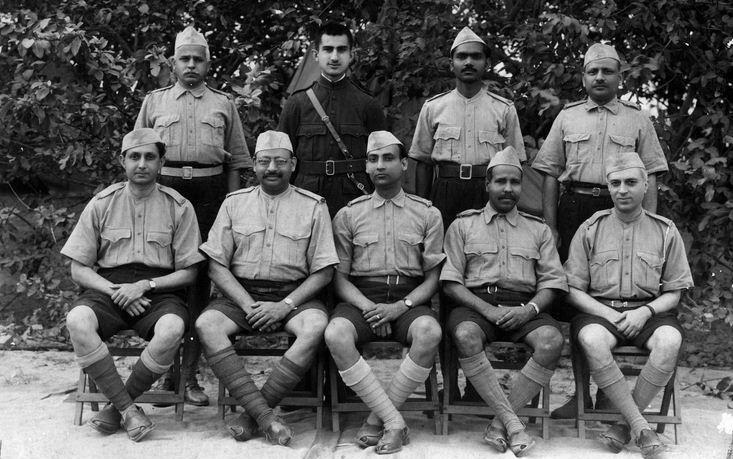
Nehru with the Seva Dal volunteer corps in Allahabad, 1940

In March 1940, Muhammad Ali Jinnah passed what came to be known as the Pakistan Resolution, declaring that, "Muslims are a nation according to any definition of a nation, and they must have their homelands, their territory and their State." This state was to be known as Pakistan, meaning 'Land of the Pure'. Nehru angrily declared that "all the old problems ... pale into insignificance before the latest stand taken by the Muslim League leader in Lahore". Linlithgow made Nehru an offer on 8 October 1940, which stated that Dominion status for India was the objective of the British government. However, it referred neither to a date nor a method to accomplish this. Only Jinnah received something more precise: "The British would not contemplate transferring power to a Congress-dominated national government, the authority of which was denied by various elements in India's national life".

In October 1940, Gandhi and Nehru, abandoning their original stand of supporting Britain, decided to launch a limited civil disobedience campaign in which leading advocates of Indian independence were selected to participate one by one. Nehru was arrested and sentenced to four years imprisonment. On 15 January 1941, Gandhi stated:

Some say Jawaharlal and I were estranged. It will require much more than a difference of opinion to estrange us. We had differences from the time we became co-workers and yet I have said for some years and say so now that not Rajaji but Jawaharlal will be my successor.

After spending a little more than a year in jail, Nehru was released, along with other Congress prisoners, three days before the bombing of Pearl Harbor in Hawaii.

=== Japan attacks India, Cripps' mission, Quit India: 1942 ===
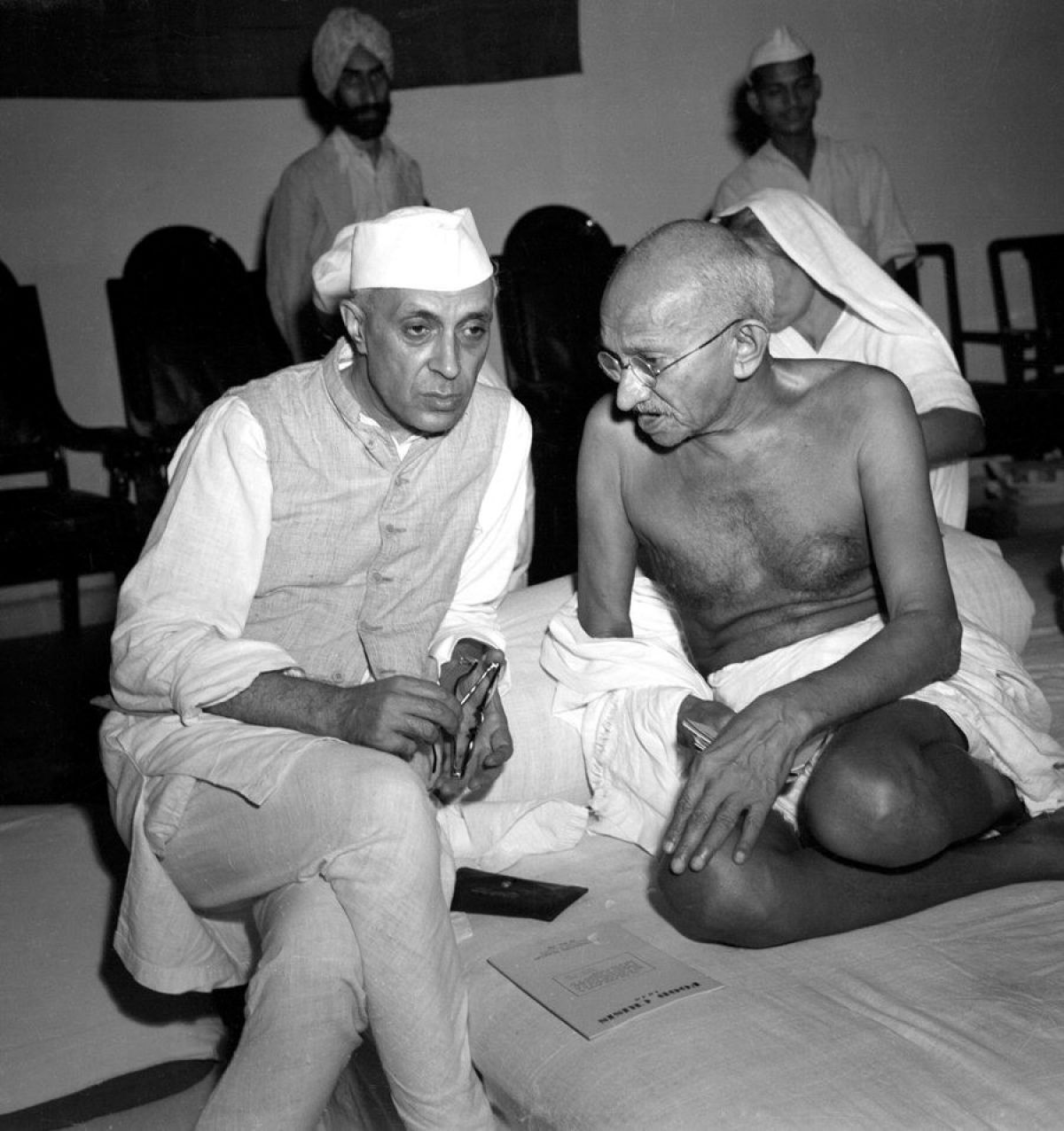
Gandhi and Nehru during the drafting of Quit India Resolution in Bombay, August 1942

When the Japanese carried their attack through Burma (now Myanmar) to the borders of India in the spring of 1942, the British government, faced with this new military threat, decided to make some overtures to India, as Nehru had originally desired. Prime Minister Winston Churchill dispatched Sir Stafford Cripps, a member of the War Cabinet who was known to be politically close to Nehru and knew Jinnah, with proposals for a settlement of the constitutional problem. As soon as he arrived, he discovered that India was more deeply divided than he had imagined. Nehru, eager for a compromise, was hopeful; Gandhi was not. Jinnah had continued opposing the Congress: "Pakistan is our only demand, and by God, we will have it," he declared in the Muslim League newspaper Dawn. Cripps' mission failed as Gandhi would accept nothing less than independence. Relations between Nehru and Gandhi cooled over the latter's refusal to co-operate with Cripps, but the two later reconciled.

In 1942, Gandhi called on the British to leave India; Nehru, though reluctant to embarrass the allied war effort, had no alternative but to join Gandhi. Following the Quit India resolution passed by the Congress party in Bombay on 8 August 1942, the entire Congress working committee, including Gandhi and Nehru, was arrested and imprisoned. Most of the Congress working committee including Nehru, Abdul Kalam Azad, and Sardar Patel were incarcerated at the Ahmednagar Fort until 15 June 1945.

=== In prison 1943–1945 ===
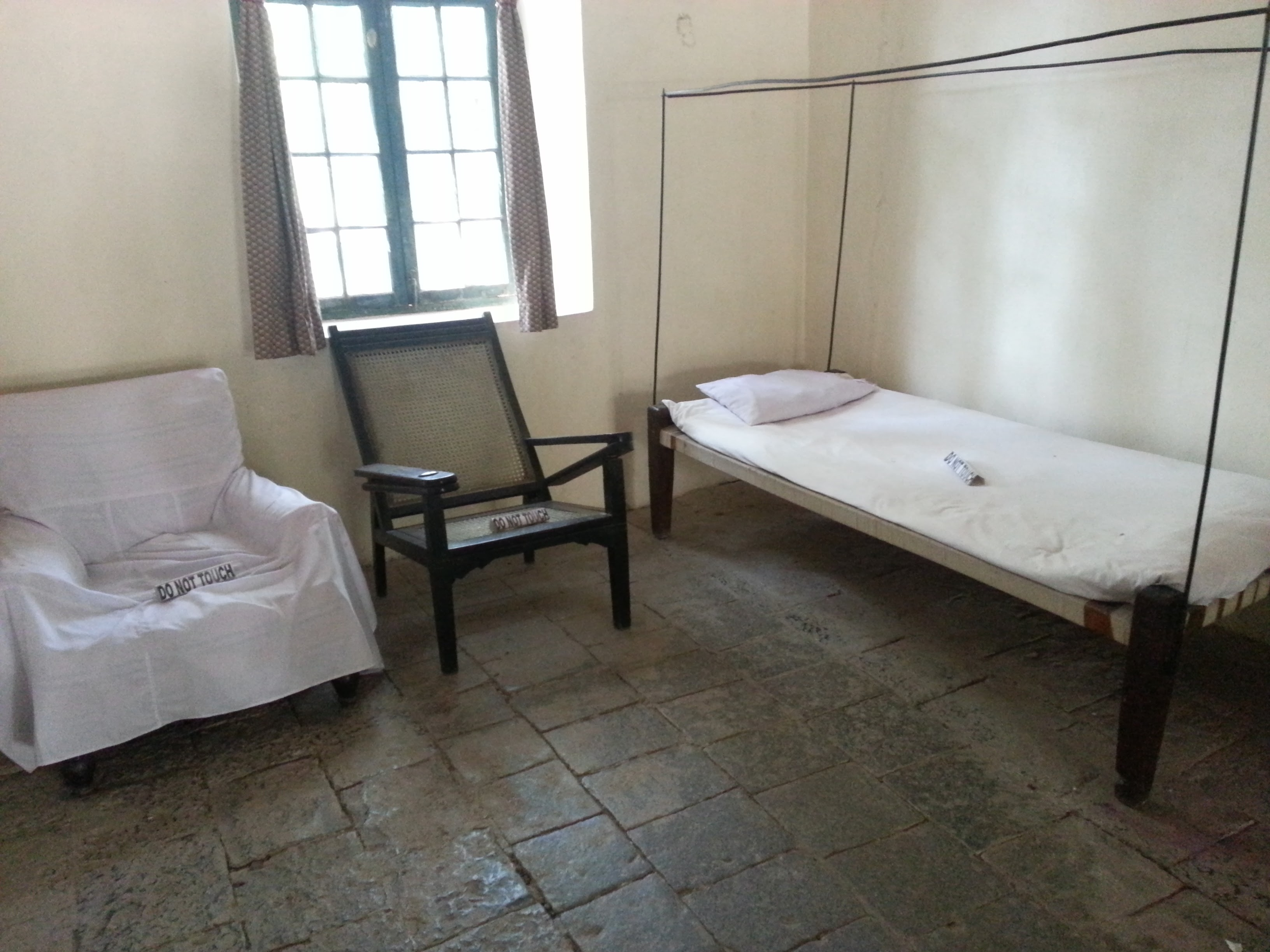
Nehru's room at Ahmednagar fort where he was incarcerated from 1942 to 1945, and where he wrote The Discovery of India

During the period when all the Congress leaders were in jail, the Muslim League under Jinnah grew in power. In April 1943, the League captured the governments of Bengal and, a month later, that of the North-West Frontier Province. In none of these provinces had the League previously had a majority—only the arrest of Congress members made it possible. With all the Muslim-dominated provinces except Punjab under Jinnah's control, the concept of a separate Muslim State was turning into a reality. However, by 1944, Jinnah's power and prestige were waning.

A general sympathy towards the jailed Congress leaders was developing among Muslims, and much of the blame for the disastrous Bengal famine of 1943–44 during which two million died had been laid on the shoulders of the province's Muslim League government. The numbers at Jinnah's meetings, once counted in thousands, soon numbered only a few hundred. In despair, Jinnah left the political scene for a stay in Kashmir. His prestige was restored unwittingly by Gandhi, who had been released from prison on medical grounds in May 1944 and had met Jinnah in Bombay in September. There, he offered the Muslim leader a plebiscite in the Muslim areas after the war to see whether they wanted to separate from the rest of India. Essentially, it was an acceptance of the principle of Pakistan—but not in so many words. Jinnah demanded that the exact words be used. Gandhi refused and the talks broke down. Jinnah, however, had greatly strengthened his own position and that of the League. The most influential member of the Congress had been seen to negotiate with him on equal terms.

=== Cabinet mission, Interim government 1946–1947 ===
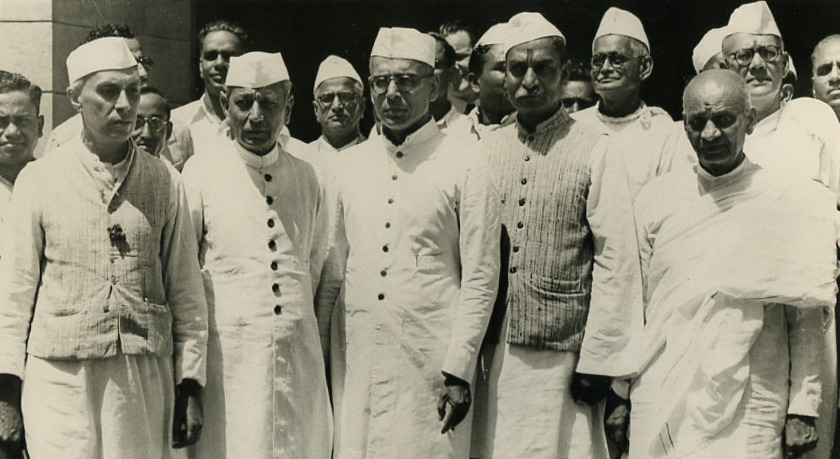
Nehru and the Congress party members of his interim government after being sworn in by the Viceroy, Lord Wavell, 2 September 1946

Nehru and his colleagues were released prior to the arrival of the British 1946 Cabinet Mission to India to propose plans for the transfer of power. The agreed plan in 1946 led to elections to the provincial assemblies. In turn, the members of the assemblies elected members of the Constituent Assembly. Congress won the majority of seats in the assembly and headed the interim government, with Nehru as the prime minister. The Muslim League joined the government later with Liaquat Ali Khan as the Finance member.

== Prime Minister of India (1947–1964) ==
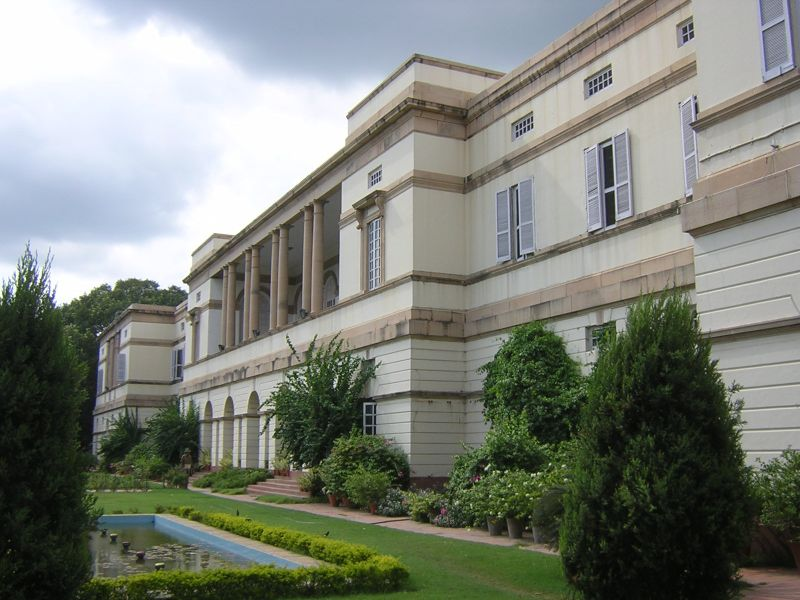
Teen Murti Bhavan, Nehru's official residence as prime minister, is now a museum.

Nehru served as prime minister for 16 years, initially as the interim prime minister, then from 1947 as the prime minister of the Dominion of India and then from 1950 as the prime minister of the Republic of India.

=== Republicanism ===
Nehru showed his concern for the princely states of South Asia since 1920s. During his Presidential Address at the Lahore session in 1929, Nehru had declared that, "The Indian States cannot live apart from the rest of India and their rulers must, unless they accept their inevitable limitations, go the way of others like them."

In July 1946, Nehru pointedly observed that no princely state could prevail militarily against the army of independent India. In January 1947, he said that independent India would not accept the divine right of kings. In May 1947, he declared that any princely state which refused to join the Constituent Assembly would be treated as an enemy state. Vallabhbhai Patel and V. P. Menon were more conciliatory towards the princes, and as the men charged with integrating the states, were successful in the task. During the drafting of the Indian constitution, many Indian leaders (except Nehru) were in favour of allowing each princely state or covenanting state to be independent as a federal state along the lines suggested originally by the Government of India Act 1935. But as the drafting of the constitution progressed, and the idea of forming a republic took concrete shape, it was decided that all the princely states/covenanting states would merge with the Indian republic.

In 1963, Nehru brought in legislation making it illegal to demand secession and introduced the Sixteenth Amendment to the Constitution which makes it necessary for those running for office to take an oath that says "I will uphold the sovereignty and integrity of India".

=== Independence, Dominion of India: 1947–1950 ===
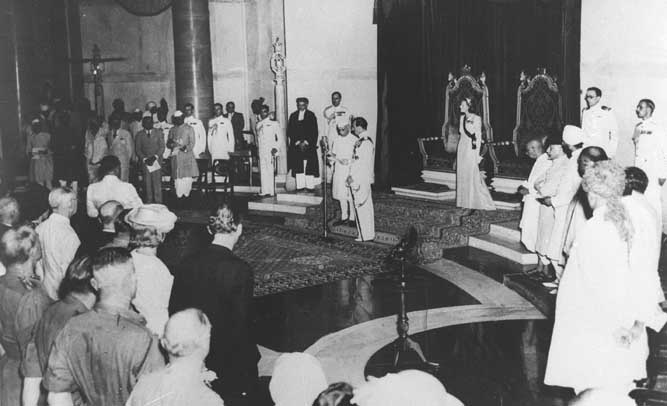
Lord Mountbatten swears in Nehru as the first Prime Minister of independent India on 15 August 1947

The period before independence in early 1947 was impaired by outbreaks of communal violence and political disorder, and the opposition of the Muslim League led by Muhammad Ali Jinnah, who were demanding a separate Muslim state of Pakistan.

==== Independence ====
He took office as the prime minister of India on 15 August and delivered his inaugural address titled "Tryst with Destiny".

Long years ago we made a tryst with destiny, and now the time comes when we shall redeem our pledge, not wholly or in full measure, but very substantially. At the stroke of the midnight hour, when the world sleeps, India will awake to life and freedom. A moment comes, which comes but rarely in history when we step out from the old to the new when an age ends, and when the soul of a nation, long suppressed, finds utterance. It is fitting that at this solemn moment we take the pledge of dedication to the service of India and her people and to the still larger cause of humanity.

==== Assassination of Mahatma Gandhi: 1948 ====
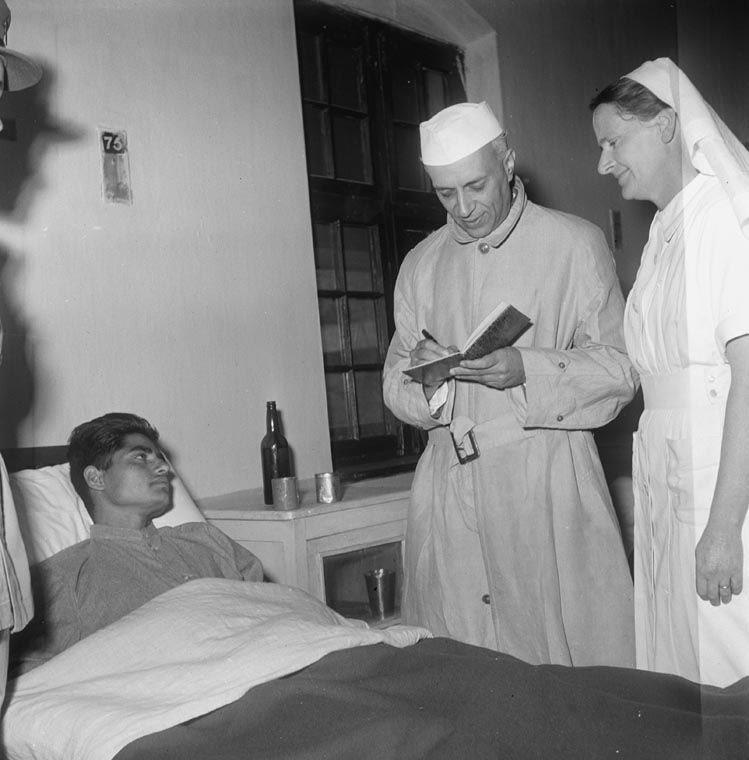
Nehru visiting an Indian soldier recovering from injuries at the Brigade Headquarters Military Hospital in Srinagar, Kashmir

On 30 January 1948, Gandhi was shot while he was walking in the garden of Birla House on his way to address a prayer meeting. The assassin, Nathuram Godse, was a Hindu nationalist with links to the extremist Hindu Mahasabha party, who held Gandhi responsible for weakening India by insisting upon a payment to Pakistan. Nehru addressed the nation by radio:

Friends and comrades, the light has gone out of our lives, and there is darkness everywhere, and I do not quite know what to tell you or how to say it. Our beloved leader, Bapu as we called him, the father of the nation, is no more. Perhaps I am wrong to say that; nevertheless, we will not see him again, as we have seen him for these many years, we will not run to him for advice or seek solace from him, and that is a terrible blow, not only for me but for millions and millions in this country.

Yasmin Khan argued that Gandhi's death and funeral helped consolidate the authority of the new Indian state under Nehru and Patel. The Congress tightly controlled the epic public displays of grief over a two-week period—the funeral, mortuary rituals and distribution of the martyr's ashes with millions participating in different events. The goal was to assert the power of the government, legitimise the Congress party's control and suppress all religious paramilitary groups. Nehru and Patel suppressed the Rashtriya Swayamsevak Sangh (RSS), the Muslim National Guards, and the Khaksars, with some 200,000 arrests. Gandhi's death and funeral linked the distant state with the Indian people and helped them to understand the need to suppress religious parties during the transition to independence for the Indian people.

==== Integration of states and Adoption of New Constitution: 1947–1950 ====
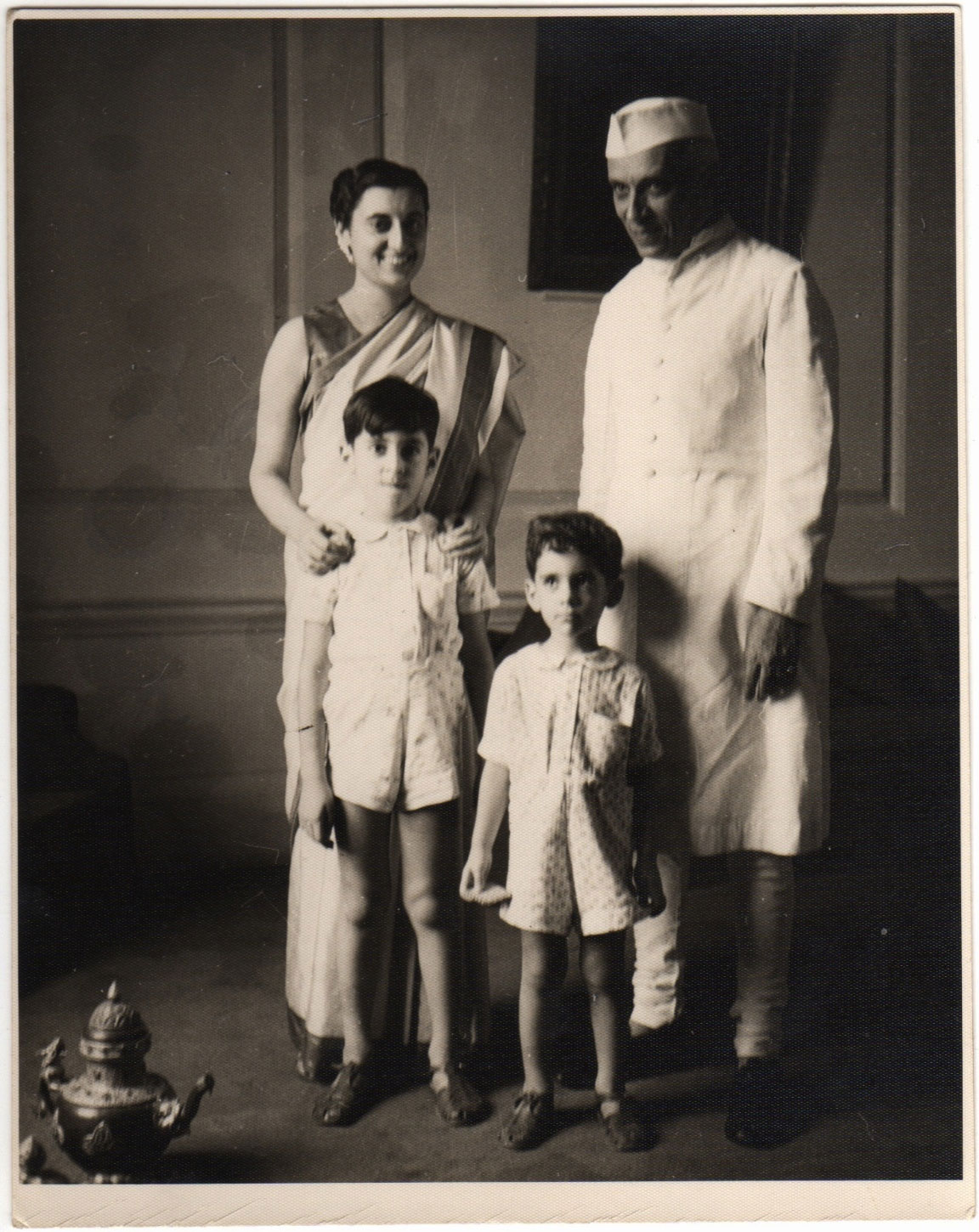
Nehru and his daughter Indira Gandhi and his two grandsons, brothers Rajiv and Sanjay in June 1949.

The British Indian Empire, which included present-day India, Pakistan, and Bangladesh, was divided into two types of territories: the provinces of British India, which were governed directly by British officials responsible to the Viceroy of India; and princely states, under the rule of local hereditary rulers who recognised British suzerainty in return for local autonomy, in most cases as established by a treaty. Between 1947 and about 1950, the territories of the princely states were politically integrated into the Indian Union under Nehru and Sardar Patel. Most were merged into existing provinces; others were organised into new provinces, such as Rajputana, Himachal Pradesh, Madhya Bharat, and Vindhya Pradesh, made up of multiple princely states; a few, including Mysore, Hyderabad, Bhopal and Bilaspur, became separate provinces. The Government of India Act 1935 remained the constitutional law of India pending the adoption of a new Constitution.

In December 1946, Nehru moved the Objectives Resolution. This resolution, upon Nehru's suggestion, ultimately turned into the Preamble to the Constitution of India. The preamble is considered to be the spirit of the Constitution. The new Constitution of India, which came into force on 26 January 1950 (Republic Day), made India a sovereign democratic republic. The new republic was declared to be a "Union of States".

=== Election of 1952 ===
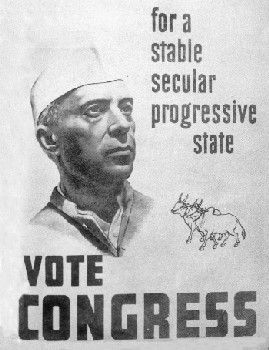
Nehru as the main campaigner of the Indian National Congress, 1951–52 elections

After the adoption of the constitution on 26 November 1949, the Constituent Assembly continued to act as the interim parliament until new elections. Nehru's interim cabinet consisted of 15 members from diverse communities and parties. The first elections to Indian legislative bodies (National parliament and State assemblies) under the new constitution of India were held in 1951-52. The Congress party under Nehru's leadership won a large majority at both state and national levels.

=== Tenure: 1952–1957 ===
In December 1953, Nehru appointed the States Reorganisation Commission to prepare for the creation of states on linguistic lines. Headed by Justice Fazal Ali, the commission itself was also known as the Fazal Ali Commission. Govind Ballabh Pant, who served as Nehru's home minister from December 1954, oversaw the commission's efforts. The commission created a report in 1955 recommending the reorganisation of India's states.

Under the Seventh Amendment, the existing distinction between Part A, Part B, Part C, and Part D states was abolished. The distinction between Part A and Part B states was removed, becoming known simply as states. A new type of entity, the union territory, replaced the classification as a Part C or Part D state. Nehru stressed commonality among Indians and promoted pan-Indianism, refusing to reorganise states on either religious or ethnic lines.

=== Subsequent elections: 1957, 1962 ===
In the 1957 elections, under Nehru's leadership, the Indian National Congress easily won a second term in power, taking 371 of the 494 seats. They gained an extra seven seats (the size of the Lok Sabha had been increased by five) and their vote share increased from 45.0% to 47.8%. The INC won nearly five times more votes than the Communist Party, the second-largest party.

In 1962, Nehru led the Congress to victory with a diminished majority. The numbers who voted for the Communist Party grew and so did right-wing parties like the Swatantra Party.

=== 1961 annexation of Goa ===
After years of failed negotiations, Krishna Menon ordered the Indian Army to invade Portuguese-controlled Portuguese India (Goa) in 1961, after which Nehru formally annexed it to India. It increased the popularity of both in India, but he was criticised by the communist opposition in India for the use of military force.

=== Sino-Indian War of 1962 ===
Map showing disputed territories of India

From 1959, in a process that accelerated in 1961, Nehru adopted the "Forward Policy" of setting up military outposts in disputed areas of the Sino-Indian border, including 43 outposts in territory not previously controlled by India. China attacked some of these outposts, and the Sino-Indian War began, which India lost. The war ended with China announcing a unilateral ceasefire and with its forces withdrawing to 20 kilometres behind the line of actual control of 1959.

The war exposed the unpreparedness of India's military, which could send only 14,000 troops to the war zone in opposition to the much larger Chinese Army, and Nehru was widely criticised for his government's insufficient attention to defence. In response, defence minister V. K. Krishna Menon resigned and Nehru sought US military aid. Nehru's improved relations with the US under John F. Kennedy proved useful during the war, as in 1962, the president of Pakistan (then closely aligned with the Americans) Ayub Khan was made to guarantee his neutrality regarding India, threatened by "communist aggression from Red China". India's relationship with the Soviet Union, criticised by right-wing groups supporting free-market policies, was also seemingly validated. Nehru would continue to maintain his commitment to the non-aligned movement, despite calls from some to permanently align with one ally.

The unpreparedness of the army was blamed on Defence Minister Menon, who "resigned" from his government post to allow for someone who might modernise India's military further. India's policy of weaponisation using indigenous sources and self-sufficiency began in earnest under Nehru, completed by his daughter Indira Gandhi, who later led India to a crushing military victory over rival Pakistan in 1971. Toward the end of the war, India had increased her support for Tibetan refugees and revolutionaries, some of them having settled in India, as they were fighting the same common enemy in the region. Nehru ordered the raising of an elite Indian-trained "Tibetan Armed Force" composed of Tibetan refugees, which served with distinction in future wars against Pakistan in 1965 and 1971.

=== Popularity ===
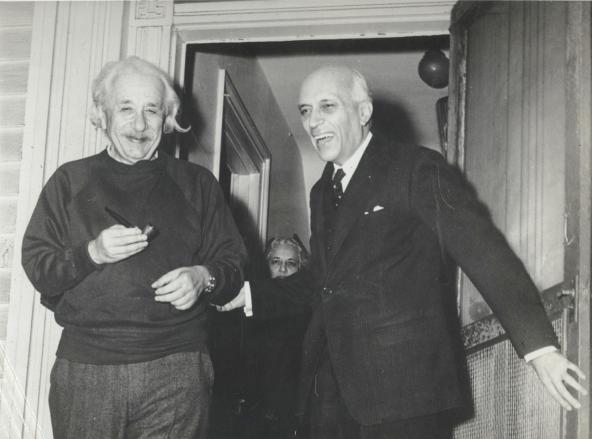
Nehru with Albert Einstein in Princeton, New Jersey, 1949

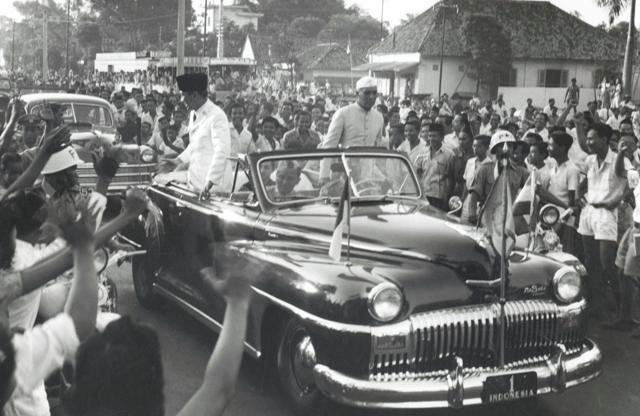
Nehru with Indonesian president Sukarno in Jakarta in 1950

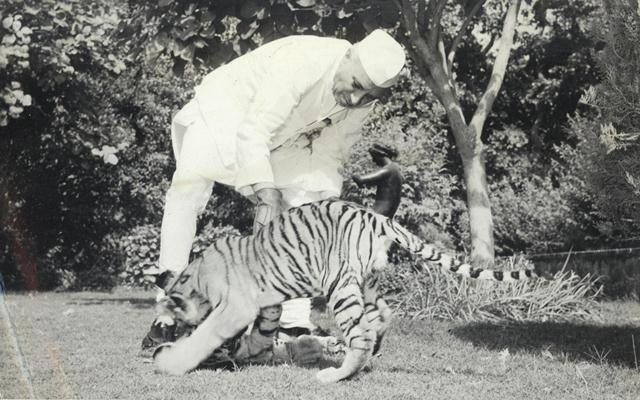
Nehru playing with a tiger cub at his home in 1955

To date, Nehru is considered the most popular prime minister, winning three consecutive elections with around 45% of the vote. A Pathé News archive video reporting Nehru's death remarks "Neither on the political stage nor in moral stature was his leadership ever challenged". In his book Verdicts on Nehru, Ramachandra Guha cited a contemporary account that described what Nehru's 1951–52 Indian general election campaign looked like:

Almost at every place, city, town, village or wayside halt, people had waited overnight to welcome the nation's leader. Schools and shops closed; milkmaids and cowherds had taken a holiday; the kisan and his helpmate took a temporary respite from their dawn-to-dusk programme of hard work in field and home. In Nehru's name, stocks of soda and lemonade sold out; even water became scarce ... Special trains were run from out-of-the-way places to carry people to Nehru's meetings, enthusiasts travelling not only on footboards but also on top of carriages. Scores of people fainted in milling crowds.

In the 1950s, Nehru was admired by world leaders such as British prime minister Winston Churchill, and US President Dwight D. Eisenhower. A letter from Eisenhower to Nehru, dated 27 November 1958, read:

Universally you are recognised as one of the most powerful influences for peace and conciliation in the world. I believe that because you are a world leader for peace in your individual capacity, as well as a representative of the largest neutral nation....

In 1955, Churchill called Nehru, "the light of Asia", and a greater light than Gautama Buddha. Nehru has repeatedly been described as a charismatic leader with a rare charm.

== Vision and governing policies ==
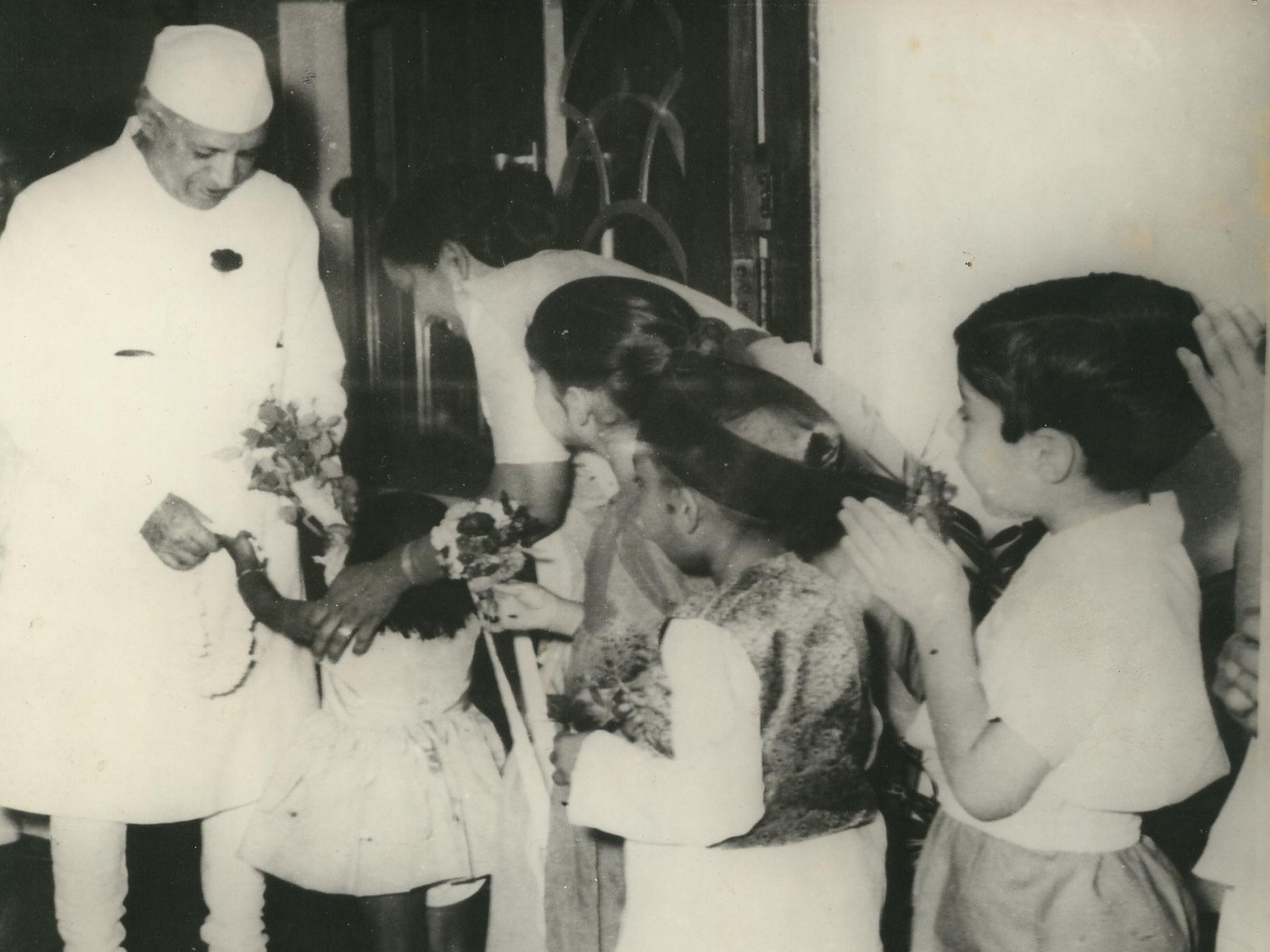
Nehru with schoolchildren at the Durgapur Steel Plant. Durgapur, Rourkela and Bhilai were three integrated steel plants set up under India's Second Five-Year Plan in the late 1950s.

According to Bhikhu Parekh, Nehru can be regarded as the founder of the modern Indian state. Parekh attributes this to the national philosophy Nehru formulated for India. For him, modernisation was the national philosophy, with seven goals: national unity, parliamentary democracy, industrialisation, socialism, development of the scientific temper, and non-alignment. In Parekh's opinion, the philosophy and the policies that resulted from this benefited a large section of society such as public sector workers, industrial houses, and middle and upper peasantry. However, it failed to benefit the urban and rural poor, the unemployed and the Hindu fundamentalists.

Nehru is credited with having prevented civil wars in India. Nehru convincingly succeeded in secularism and religious harmony, increasing the representation of minorities in government.

=== Economic policies ===
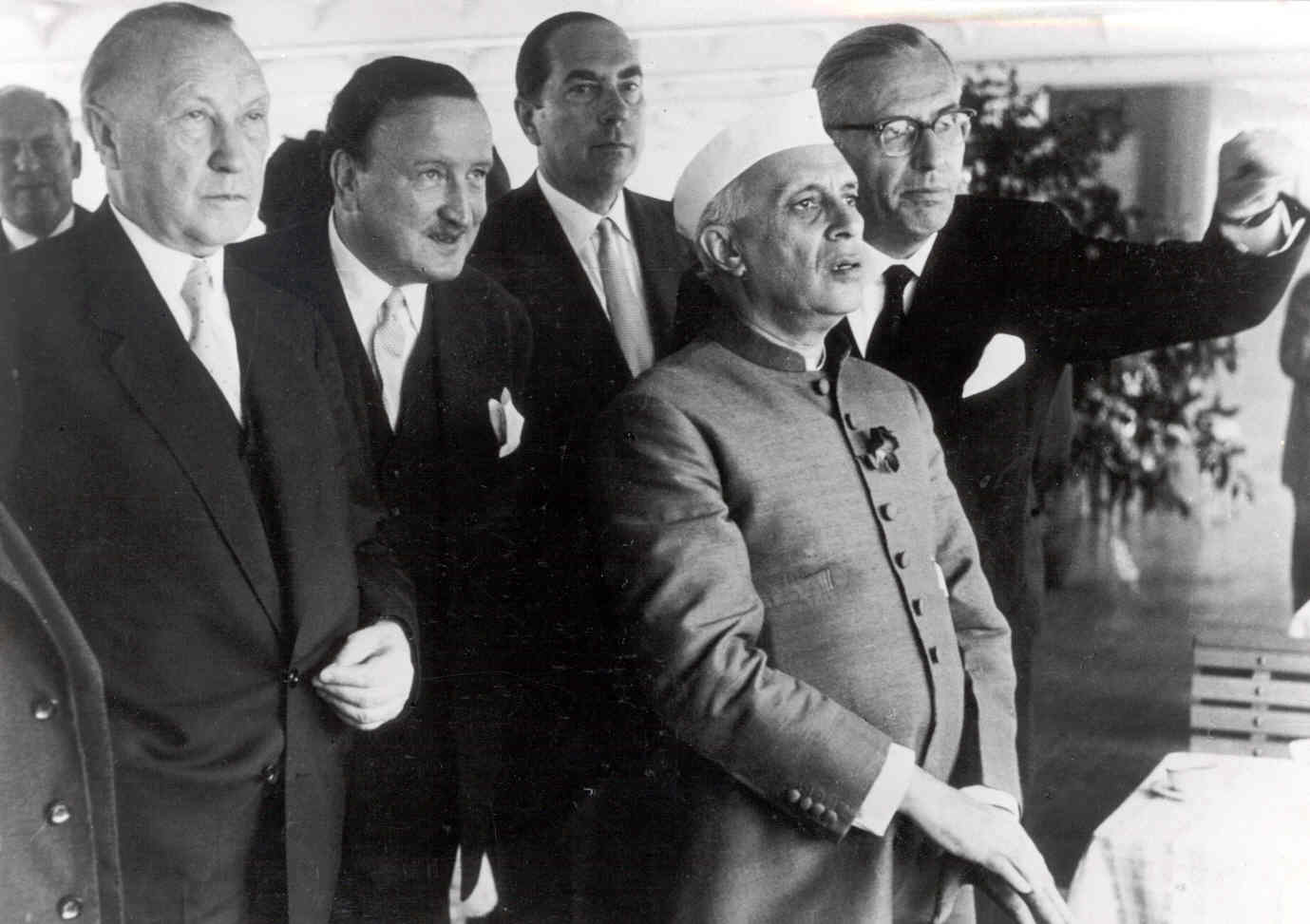
Nehru meeting with Chancellor Konrad Adenauer and Deutsche Bank chairman Hermann Josef Abs during a state visit to West Germany in June 1956.

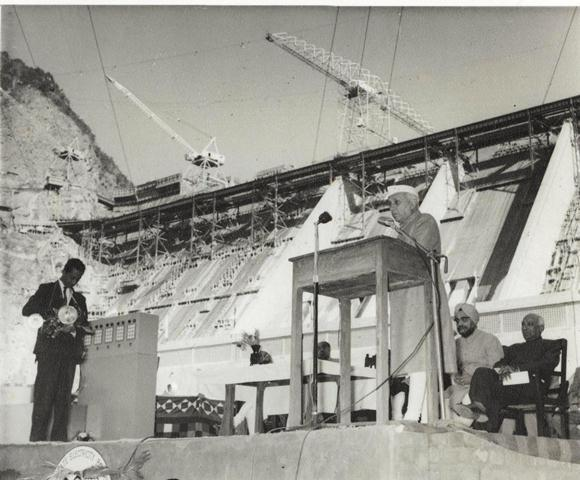
Nehru during the construction of the Bhakra Dam in the Punjab, 1953

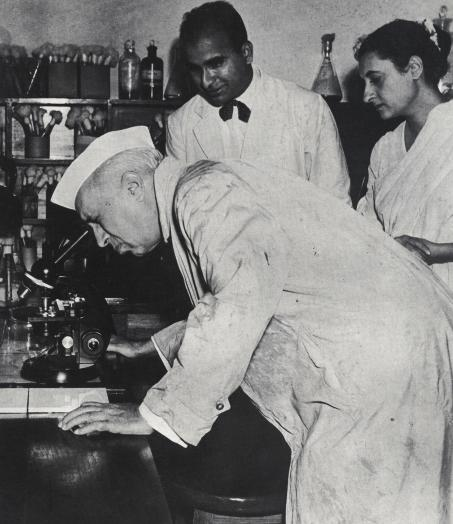
Nehru at an antibiotics manufacturing facility, Poona, 1956

Nehru implemented policies based on import substitution industrialisation and advocated a mixed economy where the government-controlled public sector would co-exist with the private sector. He believed the establishment of basic and heavy industry was fundamental to the development and modernisation of the Indian economy. The government, therefore, directed investment primarily into key public sector industries—steel, iron, coal, and power—promoting their development with subsidies and protectionist policies. Nehru's vision of an egalitarian society was "a co-operative ideal, a one world ideal, based on social justice and economic equality". In 1928, Nehru had affirmed that "Our economic programme must aim at the removal of all economic inequalities". Later in 1955, he declared that "I also want a classless society in India and the world." He identified his concept of economic freedom with the country's economic development and material advancement.

The policy of non-alignment during the Cold War meant that Nehru received financial and technical support from both power blocs in building India's industrial base from scratch. Steel mill complexes were built at Bokaro and Rourkela with assistance from the Soviet Union and West Germany. There was substantial industrial development. The industry grew 7.0% annually between 1950 and 1965—almost trebling industrial output and making India the world's seventh-largest industrial country. Nehru's critics, however, contended that India's import substitution industrialisation, which continued long after the Nehru era, weakened the international competitiveness of its manufacturing industries. India's share of world trade fell from 1.4% in 1951–1960 to 0.5% between 1981 and 1990. However, India's export performance is argued to have shown actual sustained improvement over the period. The volume of exports grew at an annual rate of 2.9% in 1951–1960 to 7.6% in 1971–1980.

GDP and GNP grew 3.9 and 4.0% annually between 1950 and 1951 and 1964–1965. It was a radical break from the British colonial period, but the growth rates were considered anaemic at best compared to other industrial powers in Europe and East Asia. India lagged behind the miracle economies (Japan, West Germany, France, and Italy). However, this mixed development strategy allowed native industrialisation to gain ground. While India's economy grew faster than both the United Kingdom and the United States, low initial income and rapid population increase meant that growth was inadequate for any sort of catch-up with rich income nations. India saw significant improvements in health, literacy and life expectancy since its independence.

=== Agriculture policies ===
Under Nehru's leadership, the government attempted to develop India quickly by embarking on agrarian reform and rapid industrialisation. A successful land reform was introduced that abolished giant landholdings, but efforts to redistribute land by placing limits on landownership failed. Attempts to introduce large-scale cooperative farming were frustrated by landowning rural elites, who formed the core of the powerful right-wing of the Congress and had considerable political support in opposing Nehru's efforts. Agricultural production expanded until the early 1960s, as additional land was brought under cultivation and some irrigation projects began to have an effect. The establishment of agricultural universities, modelled after land-grant colleges in the United States, contributed to the development of the economy. These universities worked with high-yielding varieties of wheat and rice, initially developed in Mexico and the Philippines, that in the 1960s began the Green Revolution, an effort to diversify and increase crop production. At the same time, a series of failed monsoons would cause serious food shortages, despite the steady progress and an increase in agricultural production.

=== Social policies ===
==== Education ====
Nehru was a passionate advocate of education for India's children and youth, believing it essential for India's future progress. His government oversaw the establishment of many institutions of higher learning, including the All India Institute of Medical Sciences, the Indian Institutes of Technology, the Indian Institutes of Management and the National Institutes of Technology. Nehru also outlined a commitment in his five-year plans to guarantee free and compulsory primary education to all of India's children. For this purpose, Nehru oversaw the creation of mass village enrolment programs and the construction of thousands of schools. Nehru also launched initiatives such as the provision of free milk and meals to children to fight malnutrition. Adult education centres and vocational and technical schools were also organised for adults, especially in the rural areas.

==== Hindu code bills and marriage laws ====
Under Nehru, the Indian Parliament enacted many changes to Hindu law through the Hindu code bills to criminalise caste discrimination and increase the legal rights and social freedoms of women. The Nehru administration saw such codification as necessary to unify the Hindu community, which ideally would be a first step towards unifying the nation. They succeeded in passing four Hindu code bills in 1955–56: the Hindu Marriage Act, Hindu Succession Act, Hindu Minority and Guardianship Act, and Hindu Adoptions and Maintenance Act. Those who practise Sikhism, Jainism, and Buddhism are categorised as Hindus under the jurisdiction of the Code Bill.

Nehru specifically wrote Article 44 of the Indian constitution under the Directive Principles of State Policy which states: "The State shall endeavor to secure for the citizens a uniform civil code throughout the territory of India." The article has formed the basis of secularism in India. However, Nehru has been criticised for the inconsistent application of the law. Most notably, he allowed Muslims to keep their personal law in matters relating to marriage and inheritance. In the small state of Goa, a civil code based on the old Portuguese Family Laws was allowed to continue, and Nehru prohibited Muslim personal law. This resulted from the annexation of Goa in 1961 by India, when Nehru promised the people that their laws would be left intact. This has led to accusations of selective secularism.

While Nehru exempted Muslim law from legislation and they remained unreformed, he passed the Special Marriage Act in 1954. The idea behind this act was to give everyone in India the ability to marry outside the personal law under a civil marriage. In many respects, the act was almost identical to the Hindu Marriage Act, 1955, demonstrating how secularised the law regarding Hindus had become. The Special Marriage Act allowed Muslims to marry under it and keep the protections, generally beneficial to Muslim women, that could not be found in the personal law. Under the act, polygamy was illegal, and inheritance and succession would be governed by the Indian Succession Act, rather than the respective Muslim personal law. Divorce would be governed by secular law, and maintenance of a divorced wife would be along the lines set down in civil law.

==== Language policy ====
The Constituent assembly debated the question of national language between 1946 and 1949. Within the assembly there were two blocs, pro-Hindi and anti-Hindi. The pro-Hindi bloc was further divided between supporters of Hindustani led by Nehru, and supporters of Modern Standard Hindi based on Sanskrit. The anti-Hindi bloc was generally in favour of promoting English to an official status. After an exhaustive and divisive debate, Hindi was adopted as the official rather than national language of India in 1950, with English continuing as an associate official language for 15 years, after which Hindi would become the sole official language. The Hindi-Hindustani debate was resolved through a compromise that the official language would be called Hindi, with a directive clause that while Sanskrit would be the primary source of vocabulary, the traditional Hindustani vocabulary would also be supported. Claims of other Indian languages were upheld through the Eighth Schedule to the Constitution of India.

Efforts by the Indian government to make Hindi the sole official language after 1965 were unacceptable to many non-Hindi Indian states, which wanted the continued use of English. The Dravida Munnetra Kazhagam (DMK), a descendant of Dravidar Kazhagam, led the opposition to Hindi. To allay their fears, Nehru enacted the Official Languages Act in 1963 to ensure the continuing use of English beyond 1965. The text of the Act did not satisfy the DMK and increased their scepticism that future administrations might not honour his assurances. The Congress government headed by Indira Gandhi eventually amended the Official Languages Act in 1967 to guarantee the indefinite use of Hindi and English as official languages. This effectively ensured the current "virtual indefinite policy of bilingualism" of the Indian Republic.

=== Foreign policy ===
Throughout his long tenure as the prime minister, Nehru also held the portfolio of External Affairs. His idealistic approach focused on giving India a leadership position in nonalignment. He sought to build support among the newly independent nations of Asia and Africa in opposition to the two hostile superpowers contesting the Cold War.

==== The Commonwealth ====
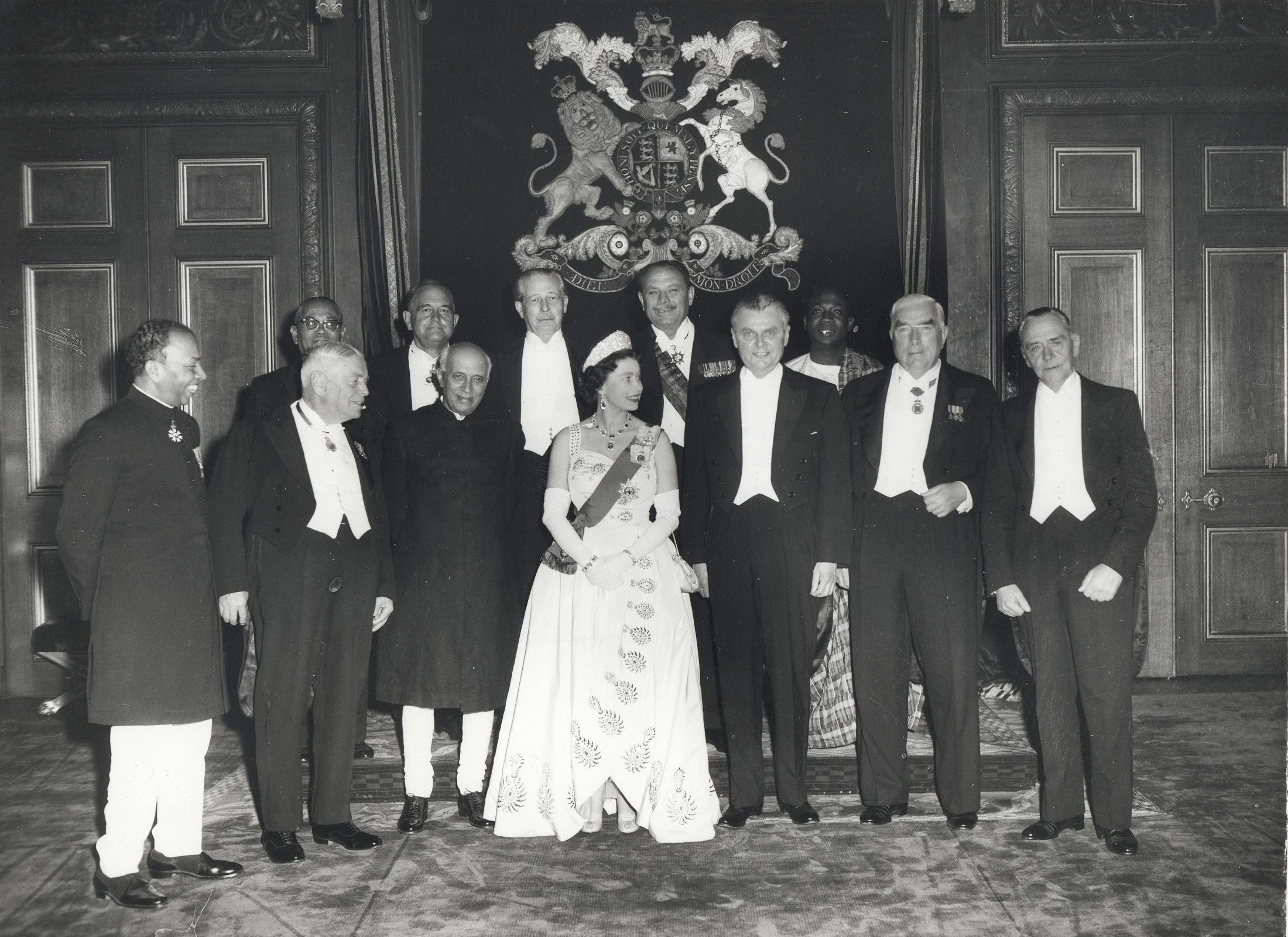
Queen Elizabeth II with Nehru and other Commonwealth leaders, taken at the 1960 Commonwealth Conference, Windsor Castle

After independence, Nehru wanted to maintain good relations with Britain and other British Commonwealth countries. As prime minister of the Dominion of India, he acquiesced only after Krishna Menon's redrafting of the 1949 London Declaration, under which India agreed to remain within the Commonwealth of Nations after becoming a republic in January 1950, and to recognise the British monarch as a "symbol of the free association of its independent member nations and as such the Head of the Commonwealth". The other nations of the Commonwealth recognised India's continuing membership of the association.

==== Non-aligned movement ====
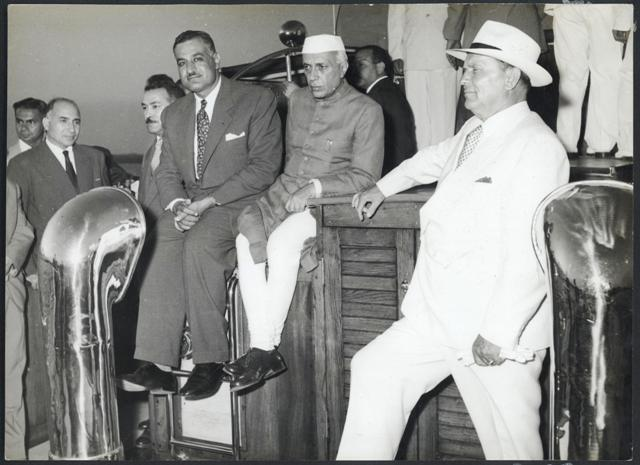
Nehru with Gamal Abdel Nasser and Josip Broz Tito in Belgrade, Yugoslavia, 1961

On the international scene, Nehru was an opponent of military action and military alliances. He was a strong supporter of the United Nations, except when it tried to resolve the Kashmir question. He pioneered the policy of non-alignment and co-founded the Non-Aligned Movement of nations professing neutrality between the rival blocs of nations led by the US and the USSR. The term "non-alignment" was coined earlier by V. K. Krishna Menon at the United Nations in 1953 and 1954. India recognised the People's Republic of China soon after its founding (while most of the Western bloc continued relations with Taiwan). Nehru argued for its inclusion in the United Nations and refused to brand the Chinese as the aggressors in the West's conflict with Korea. He sought to establish warm and friendly relations with China in 1950 and hoped to act as an intermediary to bridge the gulf and tensions between the communist states and the Western bloc.

Nehru was a key organiser of the Bandung Conference of April 1955, which brought 29 newly independent nations together from Asia and Africa, and was designed to galvanise the nonalignment movement under Nehru's leadership. He envisioned it as his key leadership opportunity on the world stage, where he would bring together emerging nations. He was one of the key participants of the 1st Summit of the Non-Aligned Movement in 1961 in Belgrade, FPR Yugoslavia.

==== Defence and nuclear policy ====
While averse to war, Nehru led the campaigns against Pakistan in Kashmir. He used military force to annex Hyderabad in 1948 and Goa in 1961. While laying the foundation stone of the National Defence Academy in 1949, he stated:

We, who for generations had talked about and attempted in everything a peaceful way and practised non-violence, should now be, in a sense, glorifying our army, navy and air force. It means a lot. Though it is odd, yet it simply reflects the oddness of life. Though life is logical, we have to face all contingencies, and unless we are prepared to face them, we will go under. There was no greater prince of peace and apostle of non-violence than Mahatma Gandhi...but yet, he said it was better to take the sword than to surrender, fail or run away. We cannot live carefree assuming that we are safe. Human nature is such. We cannot take the risks and risk our hard-won freedom. We have to be prepared with all modern defence methods and a well-equipped army, navy, and air force."

Many hailed Nehru for working to defuse global tensions and the threat of nuclear weapons after the Korean War (1950–1953). He commissioned the first study of the effects of nuclear explosions on human health and campaigned ceaselessly for the abolition of what he called "these frightful engines of destruction". He also had pragmatic reasons for promoting de-nuclearisation, fearing a nuclear arms race would lead to over-militarisation that would be unaffordable for developing countries such as his own.

==== Defending Kashmir ====
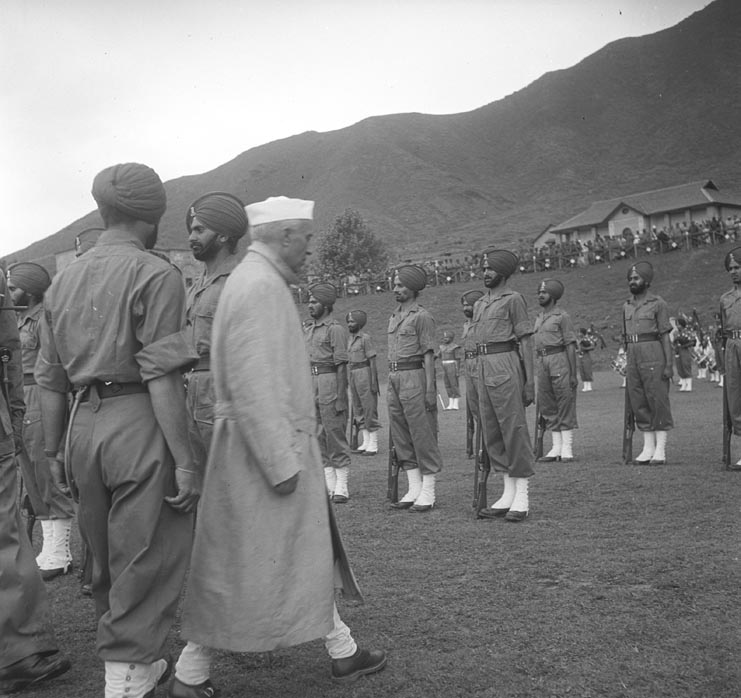
Nehru inspecting the troops on a visit to the Srinagar Brigade Headquarters Military Hospital, April 1948

At Lord Mountbatten's urging, in 1948, Nehru had promised to hold a plebiscite in Kashmir under the auspices of the UN. Kashmir was a disputed territory between India and Pakistan, the two went to war over it in 1947. However, as Pakistan failed to pull back troops in accordance with the UN resolution, and as Nehru grew increasingly wary of the UN, he declined to hold a plebiscite in 1953. His policies on Kashmir and the integration of the state into India were frequently defended before the United Nations by his aide, V. K. Krishna Menon, who earned a reputation in India for his passionate speeches.

In 1953, Nehru orchestrated the ouster and arrest of Sheikh Abdullah, the prime minister of Kashmir, whom he had previously supported but was now suspected of harbouring separatist ambitions; Bakshi Ghulam Mohammad replaced him.

Menon was instructed to deliver an unprecedented eight-hour speech defending India's stand on Kashmir in 1957; to date, the speech is the longest ever delivered in the United Nations Security Council, covering five hours of the 762nd meeting on 23 January, and two hours and forty-eight minutes on the 24th, reportedly concluding with Menon's collapse on the Security Council floor. During the filibuster, Nehru moved swiftly and successfully to consolidate Indian power in Kashmir (then under great unrest). Menon's passionate defence of Indian sovereignty in Kashmir enlarged his base of support in India and led to the Indian press temporarily dubbing him the "Hero of Kashmir". Nehru was then at the peak of his popularity in India; the only (minor) criticism came from the far right.

==== China ====
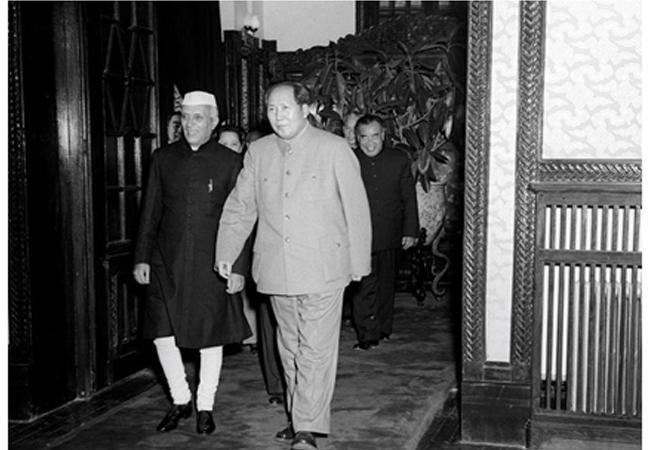
Nehru and Mao Zedong in Beijing, China, October 1954

In 1954, Nehru signed with China the Five Principles of Peaceful Coexistence, known in India as the Panchsheel (from the Sanskrit words, panch: five, sheel: virtues), a set of principles to govern relations between the two states. Their first formal codification in treaty form was in an agreement between China and India in 1954, which recognised Chinese sovereignty over Tibet. They were enunciated in the preamble to the "Agreement (with the exchange of notes) on Trade and Intercourse between Tibet Region of China and India", which was signed at Peking on 29 April 1954. Negotiations took place in Delhi from December 1953 to April 1954 between the Delegation of the People's Republic of China (PRC) Government and the Delegation of the Indian Government on the relations between the two countries regarding the disputed territories of Aksai Chin and South Tibet. By 1957, Chinese Premier Zhou Enlai had also persuaded Nehru to accept the Chinese position on Tibet, thus depriving Tibet of a possible ally, and of the possibility of receiving military aid from India. The treaty was disregarded in the 1960s, but in the 1970s, the Five Principles again came to be seen as important in China–India relations, and more generally as norms of relations between states. They became widely recognised and accepted throughout the region during the premiership of Indira Gandhi and the three-year rule of the Janata Party (1977–1980). Although the Five Principles of Peaceful Coexistence were the basis of the 1954 Sino-Indian border treaty, in later years, Nehru's foreign policy suffered from increasing Chinese assertiveness over border disputes and his decision to grant asylum to the 14th Dalai Lama.

==== United States ====
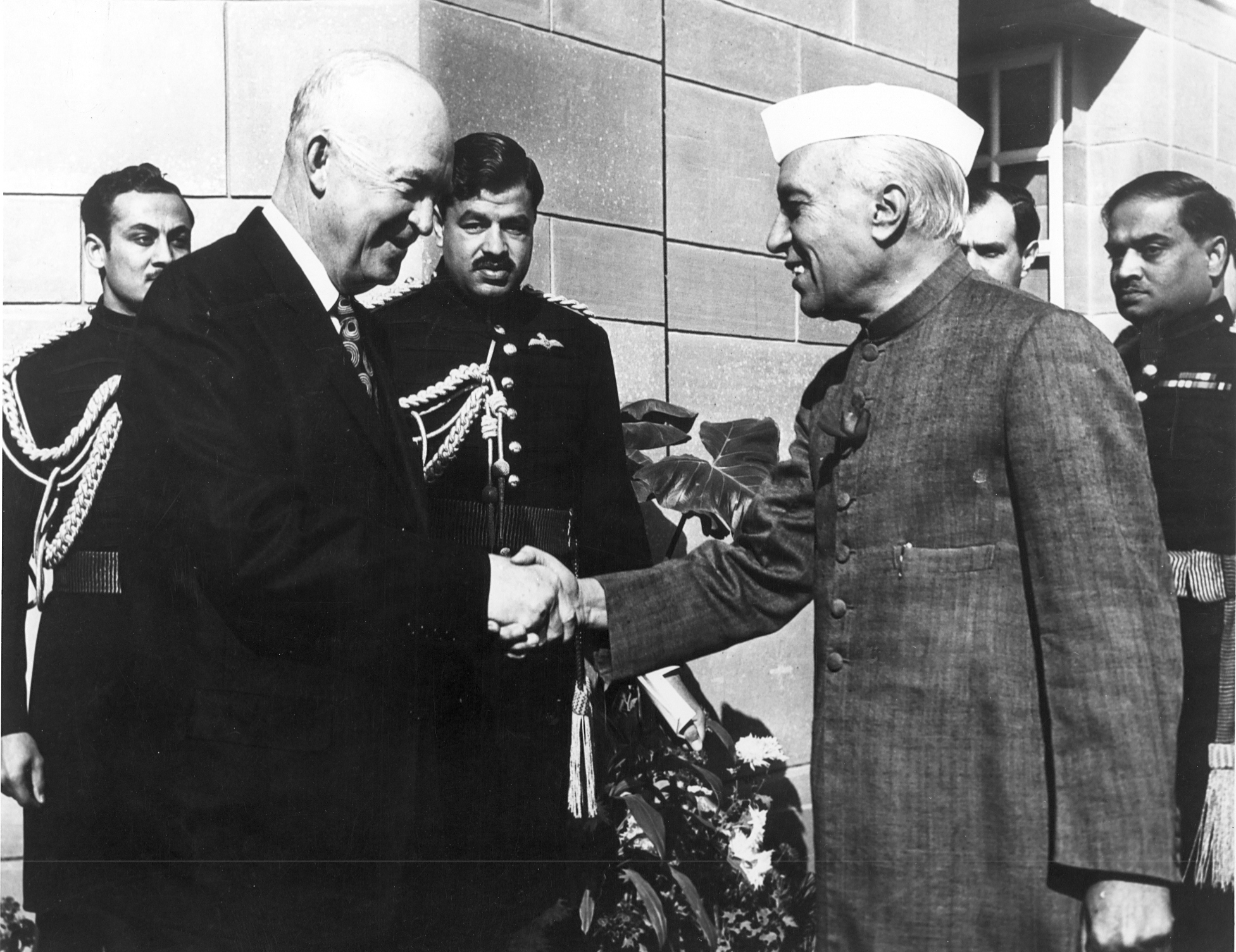
Nehru receiving US President Dwight D. Eisenhower at Parliament House, 1959

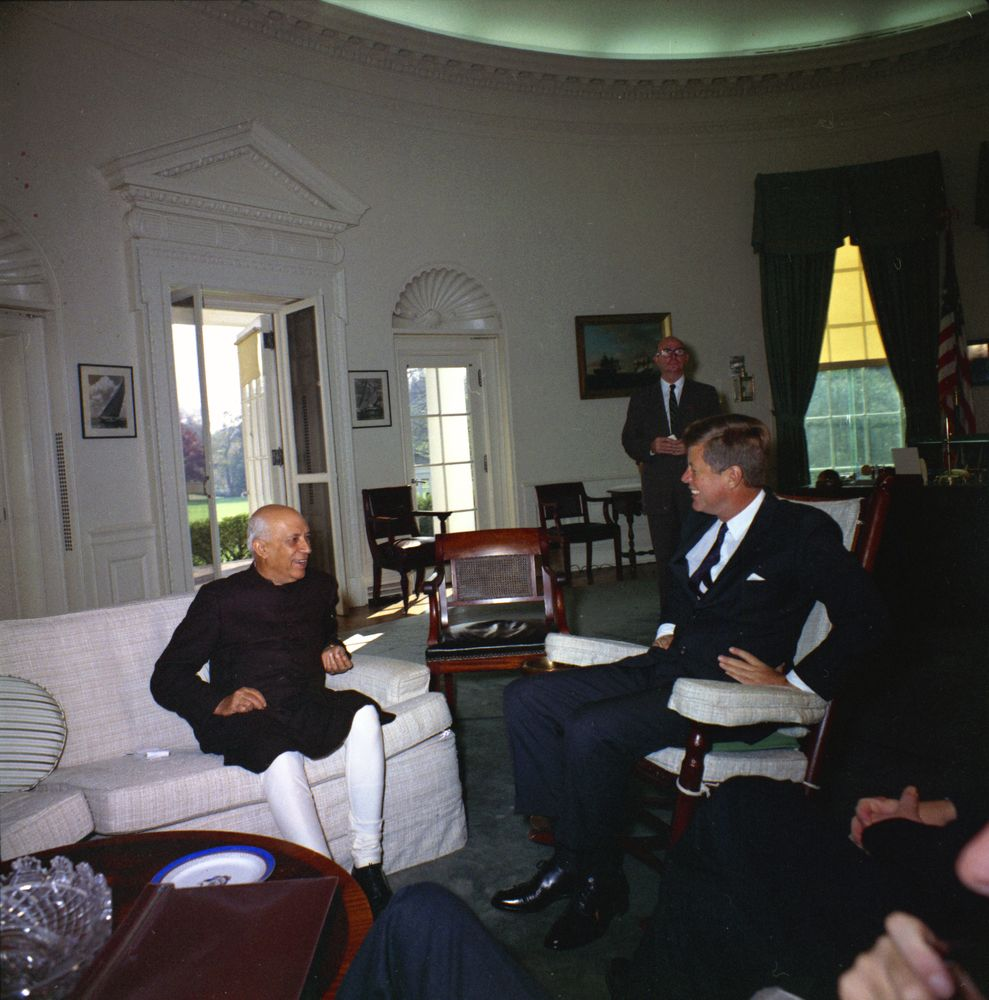
Nehru with John F. Kennedy at the White House, 7 November 1961

In 1956, Nehru criticised the joint invasion of the Suez Canal by the British, French, and Israelis. His role, both as Indian prime minister and a leader of the Non-Aligned Movement, was significant; he tried to be even-handed between the two sides while vigorously denouncing Anthony Eden and co-sponsors of the invasion. Nehru had a powerful ally in the US President Dwight Eisenhower who, if relatively silent publicly, went to the extent of using America's clout at the International Monetary Fund to make Britain and France back down. During the Suez crisis, Nehru's right-hand man, Menon attempted to persuade a recalcitrant Gamal Nasser to compromise with the West and was instrumental in moving Western powers towards an awareness that Nasser might prove willing to compromise.

== Assassination attempts and security ==
There were various assassination attempts on Nehru. The first attempt was made during partition in 1947 while he was visiting the North-West Frontier Province (now in Pakistan) in a car. The second attempt came from Baburao Laxman Kochale, a knife-wielding rickshaw-puller, near Nagpur in 1955. The third attempt was a plot by Central Intelligence Agency (CIA) in 1955. The fourth attempt took place in Bombay in 1956, and the fifth was a failed bombing attempt on train tracks in Maharashtra in 1961. Despite threats to his life, Nehru despised having too much security around him and did not like to disrupt traffic because of his movements.

== Death ==
If any people choose to think of me then I should like them to say, "This was the man who with all his mind and heart loved India and the Indian people. And they in turn were indulgent to him and gave him of their love most abundantly and extravagantly."

– Jawaharlal Nehru, 1954.

Nehru's health began declining steadily in 1962. In the spring of 1962, he was affected with a viral infection over which he spent most of April in bed. In the next year, through 1963, he spent months recuperating in Kashmir. Some writers attribute this dramatic decline to his surprise and chagrin over the Sino-Indian War, which he perceived as a betrayal of trust. Upon his return from Dehradun on 26 May 1964, he was feeling quite comfortable and went to bed at about 23:30 as usual. He had a restful night until about 06:30. Soon after he returned from the bathroom, Nehru complained of pain in the back. He spoke to the doctors who attended to him for a brief while, and almost immediately he collapsed. He remained unconscious until he died at 13:44. His death was announced in the Lok Sabha at 14:00 local time on 27 May 1964; the cause of death was believed to be a heart attack. Draped in the Indian national Tri-colour flag, the body of Jawaharlal Nehru was placed for public viewing. "Raghupati Raghava Rajaram" was chanted as the body was placed on the platform. On 28 May, Nehru was cremated in accordance with Hindu rites at the Shantivan on the banks of the Yamuna, witnessed by 1.5 million mourners who had flocked into the streets of Delhi and the cremation grounds.

US President Lyndon B. Johnson remarked on his death:-

History has already recorded his monumental contribution to the molding of a strong and independent India. And yet, it is not just as a leader of India that he has served humanity. Perhaps more than any other world leader he has given expression to man's yearning for peace. This is the issue of our age. In his fearless pursuit of a world free from war he has served all humanity.

Soviet Premier Nikita Khrushchev and the future Soviet Leader Leonid Brezhnev remarked:-

The name of Jawaharal Nehru enjoyed the tremendous respect and love of the Soviet people, who knew him as a tested and wise leader of the Indian people's struggle for national independence and the rebirth of their country, and as an active fighter against colonialism. Jawaharal Nehru is known as an outstanding statesman of modern times who devoted his entire life to the struggle for strengthening friendship and cooperation among peoples and for the progress of humanity. He was a passionate fighter for peace in the world and an ardent champion of principles of peaceful coexistence of states. He was the inspirer of the nonalignment policy promoted by the Indian Government. This reasonable policy won India respect and, due to it, India is now occupying a worthy place in the international arena.

Countries such as Egypt, Cambodia, Nepal, Kuwait, Bhutan, Kingdom of Sikkim, Nepal, Pakistan, Syria, Iraq, Uganda, Malaysia, Yugoslavia, Ceylon (now Sri Lanka), India and others declared national mourning over the death of Nehru.

Nehru's death left India with no clear political heir to his leadership. Lal Bahadur Shastri later succeeded Nehru as the prime minister.

The death was announced to the Indian parliament in words similar to Nehru's own at the time of Gandhi's assassination: "The light is out." India's future prime minister and then a Rajya Sabha MP from Uttar Pradesh Atal Bihari Vajpayee famously delivered Nehru an acclaimed eulogy. After Nehru's death, Vajpayee made a speech in the Rajya Sabha, hailing Nehru as Bharat Mata's "favourite prince" and likened him to the Hindu god Rama.

== Positions held ==
Year	Description
1946–1950	Elected to Constituent Assembly of India: Vice President of Executive Council (2 Sep 1946 – 15 April 1952); Prime Minister of India (15 Aug 1947 – 15 April 1952); Union Minister for External Affairs (15 Aug 1947 – 15 April 1952)
1952–1957	Elected to 1st Lok Sabha: Prime Minister of India (15 Apr 1952 – 17 April 1957); Union Minister for External Affairs (15 Apr 1952 – 17 April 1957)
1957–1962	Elected to 2nd Lok Sabha: Prime Minister of India (17 Apr 1957 – 2 April 1962); Union Minister for External Affairs (17 Apr 1957 – 2 April 1962)
1962–1964	Elected to 3rd Lok Sabha: Prime Minister of India (2 Apr 1962 – 27 May 1964); Union Minister for External Affairs (2 Apr 1962 – 27 May 1964)

== Key cabinet members and associates ==
Nehru served as the prime minister for nearly eighteen years, first as interim prime minister during 1946–1947 during the last year of the British Raj and then as prime minister of independent India from 15 August 1947 to 27 May 1964.

V. K. Krishna Menon (1896–1974) was a close associate of Nehru, and was described as the second most powerful man in India during Nehru's tenure as prime minister. From the inception of Nehru's prime ministry, Menon carefully selected Lord Mountbatten as the only suitable candidate and presented him as such to Labour through Sir Stafford Cripps and Clement Attlee, who promptly appointed him the last Viceroy. The early governance and partition ultimately reduced to Mountbatten, Nehru, Menon, V.P. Menon, Sardar Patel, and an adamant Jinnah. Under Nehru, he served as India's high commissioner to the UK, ambassador to Ireland, ambassador-at-large and plenipotentiary, UN ambassador, minister without portfolio, de facto Foreign minister, and Union minister of defence. He was significantly involved in the annexation of Goa. He resigned after the debacle of the 1962 China War but remain a close friend of Nehru.

B. R. Ambedkar, the law minister in the interim cabinet, also chaired the Constitution Drafting Committee.

Vallabhbhai Patel served as home minister in the interim government. He was instrumental in getting the Congress party working committee to vote for partition. He is also credited with integrating many princely states of India. Patel was a long-time comrade to Nehru but died in 1950, leaving Nehru as the unchallenged leader of India until his own death in 1964.

Syama Prasad Mukherjee served as the first Minister for Industry and Supply in the first ministry of Nehru. After resigning from the cabinet, he founded the Bharatiya Jana Sangh in 1951, the forerunner of the Bharatiya Janata Party.

Maulana Azad was the First Minister of Education in the Indian government Minister of Human Resource Development (until 25 September 1958, Ministry of Education). His contribution to establishing the education foundation in India is recognised by celebrating his birthday as National Education Day across India.

Jagjivan Ram became the youngest minister in Nehru's Interim Government of India, a labour minister and also a member of the Constituent Assembly of India, where, as a member of the Dalit caste, he ensured that social justice was enshrined in the Constitution. He went on to serve as a minister with various portfolios during Nehru's tenure and in Shastri and Indira Gandhi governments.

Morarji Desai was a nationalist with anti-corruption leanings but was socially conservative, pro-business, and in favour of free enterprise reforms, as opposed to Prime Minister Jawaharlal Nehru's socialistic policies. After serving as chief minister of Bombay State, he joined Nehru's cabinet in 1956 as the finance minister of India. He held that position until 1963 when he along with other senior ministers in the Nehru cabinet resigned under the Kamaraj plan.The plan, as proposed by Madras Chief Minister K. Kamaraj, was to revert government ministers to party positions after a certain tenure and vice versa. With Nehru's age and health failing in the early 1960s, Desai was considered a possible contender for the position of Prime Minister. Later Desai alleged that Nehru used the Kamaraj Plan to remove all possible contenders from the path of his daughter, Indira Gandhi. Desai succeeded Indira Gandhi as the prime minister in 1977 when he was selected by the victorious Janata alliance as their parliamentary leader.

Govind Ballabh Pant (1887–1961) was a key figure in the Indian independence movement and later a pivotal figure in the politics of Uttar Pradesh (UP) and in the Indian Government. Pant served in Nehru's cabinet as Union home minister from 1955 until his death in 1961. As home minister, his chief achievement was the re-organisation of states along linguistic lines. He was also responsible for the establishment of Hindi as the official language of the central government and a few states. During his tenure as the home minister, Pant was awarded the Bharat Ratna.

C. D. Deshmukh was one of five members of the Planning Commission when it was constituted in 1950 by a cabinet resolution. Deshmukh succeeded John Mathai as the Union Finance Minister in 1950 after Mathai resigned in protest over the transfer of certain powers to the Planning Commission. As finance minister, Deshmukh remained a member of the Planning Commission. Deshmukh's tenure—during which he delivered six budgets and an interim budget—is noted for the effective management of the Indian economy and its steady growth which saw it recover from the impacts of the events of the 1940s. During Deshmukh's tenure, the State Bank of India was formed in 1955 through the nationalisation and amalgamation of the Imperial Bank with several smaller banks. He accomplished the nationalisation of insurance companies and the formation of the Life Insurance Corporation of India through the Life Insurance Corporation of India Act, 1956. Deshmukh resigned over the Government's proposal to move a bill in Parliament bifurcating Bombay State into Gujarat and Maharashtra while designating the city of Bombay a Union territory.

In the years following independence, Nehru frequently turned to his daughter Indira Gandhi for managing his personal affairs. Indira moved into Nehru's official residence to attend to him and became his constant companion in his travels across India and the world. She would virtually become Nehru's chief of staff. Towards the end of the 1950s, Indira Gandhi served as the president of the Congress. In that capacity, she was instrumental in getting the Communist-led Kerala State Government dismissed in 1959. Indira was elected as Congress party president in 1959, which aroused criticism for alleged nepotism, although Nehru had actually disapproved of her election, partly because he considered that it smacked of "dynasticism"; he said, indeed it was "wholly undemocratic and an undesirable thing", and refused her a position in his cabinet. Indira herself was at loggerheads with her father over policy; most notably, she used his oft-stated personal deference to the Congress Working Committee to push through the dismissal of the Communist Party of India government in the state of Kerala, over his own objections. Nehru began to be embarrassed by her ruthlessness and disregard for parliamentary tradition and was "hurt" by what he saw as an assertiveness with no purpose other than to stake out an identity independent of her father.

== Religious and personal beliefs ==
Described as a Hindu agnostic, and styling himself as a "scientific humanist", Nehru thought that religious taboos were preventing India from moving forward and adapting to modern conditions: "No country or people who are slaves to dogma and dogmatic mentality can progress, and unhappily our country and people have become extraordinarily dogmatic and little-minded."

The spectacle of what is called religion, or at any rate organised religion, in India and elsewhere, has filled me with horror and I have frequently condemned it and wished to make a clean sweep of it. Almost always it seemed to stand for blind belief and reaction, dogma and bigotry, superstition, exploitation and the preservation of vested interests.

— Toward Freedom: The Autobiography of Jawaharlal Nehru (1936); pp. 240–241.

As a humanist, Nehru considered that his afterlife was not in some mystical heaven or reincarnation but in the practical achievements of a life lived fully with and for his fellow human beings: "...Nor am I greatly interested in life after death. I find the problems of this life sufficiently absorbing to fill my mind," he wrote. In his Last Will and Testament, he wrote: "I wish to declare with all earnestness that I do not want any religious ceremonies performed for me after my death. I do not believe in such ceremonies, and to submit to them, even as a matter of form, would be hypocrisy and an attempt to delude ourselves and others."

In his autobiography, he analysed Abrahamic and Indian religions and their impact on India. He wanted to model India as a secular country; his secularist policies remain a subject of debate mainly by the Hindutva proponents.

Nehru also believed that a world government needs to be formed for the sake of world peace.

The Committee is of the opinion that future peace, security and ordered progress of the world demand a world federation of free nations, and on no other basis can the problems of the world be solved. Such a world federation would ensure the freedom of its constituent nations, the prevention of aggression and exploitation of one nation over another, the protection of national minorities, the advancement of all backward areas and peoples, and the pooling of the world’s resources for the common good of all. On the establishment of such a world federation, disarmament would be practicable in all countries, national armies, navies and air forces would no longer be necessary, and a world federal defence force would keep the peace and prevent aggression. …The Committee regretfully realizes, however, despite the tragic and overwhelming lessons of the war and the perils that overhang the world, the Governments of few countries are yet prepared to take this inevitable step towards world federation.

— Quit India resolution of 8 August 1942.

== Awards and honours ==
In 1948, Nehru was conferred an honorary doctorate by the University of Mysore. He later received honorary doctorates from the University of Madras, Columbia University, and Keio University. The Hamburg University had awarded Nehru two honorary degrees of the Faculties of Law and Agriculture.

In 1955, Nehru was awarded the Bharat Ratna, India's highest civilian honour. President Rajendra Prasad awarded him the honour without taking advice from the Prime Minister and added that "I am taking this step on my own initiative".

In 1970, he was posthumously awarded with the World Peace Council Prize.

=== National honours ===
- India:
  - Bharat Ratna (1955)

=== Foreign honours ===
- Indonesia:
  - Star of the Republic of Indonesia, Adipurna (1995, posthumous)
- South Africa:
  - Order of the Companions of O. R. Tambo, Grand Companion (2005, posthumous)

=== Freedom of the City ===
- Belgrade, Yugoslavia:
  - Honorary Citizenship of Belgrade (1955)
- London, United Kingdom:
  - Freedom of the City of London (1956).

== Legacy ==
Nehru was a great man... Nehru gave to Indians an image of themselves that I don't think others might have succeeded in doing. – Sir Isaiah Berlin

Jawaharlal Nehru, next to Mahatma Gandhi, is regarded as the most significant figure of the Indian independence movement that successfully ended British rule over the Indian subcontinent. He is also noted for contributing in the independence of Libya, Indonesia and other countries.

As India's first prime minister and external affairs minister, Nehru played a major role in shaping modern India's government and political culture along with the sound foreign policy. He is praised for creating a system providing universal primary education, reaching children in the farthest corners of rural India. Nehru's education policy is also credited for the development of world-class educational institutions like the All India Institute of Medical Sciences, Indian Institutes of Technology, and the Indian Institutes of Management.

Following the independence, Nehru popularised the credo of "unity in diversity" and implemented it as state policy. This proved particularly important as post-Independence differences surfaced since British withdrawal from the subcontinent prompted regional leaders to no longer relate to one another as allies against a common adversary. While differences in culture and, especially, language threatened the unity of the new nation, Nehru established programs such as the National Book Trust and the National Literary Academy which promoted the translation of regional works of literatures between languages and organised the transfer of materials between regions. In pursuit of a single, unified India, Nehru warned, "Integrate or perish."

Called an "architect of India", he is widely recognised as the greatest figure of modern India after Mahatma Gandhi; on the occasion of his first death anniversary in 1965, Sarvepalli Radhakrishnan, Lal Bahadur Shastri and others described him as such.

Writing in 2005, Ramachandra Guha wrote that while no other Indian prime minister was ever close to the challenges that Nehru dealt with and if Nehru had died in 1958 then he would be remembered as the greatest statesman of the 20th century. However, in recent years, Nehru's reputation has seen re-emergence and he is credited for keeping India together contrary to predictions of many that the country was bound to fall apart.

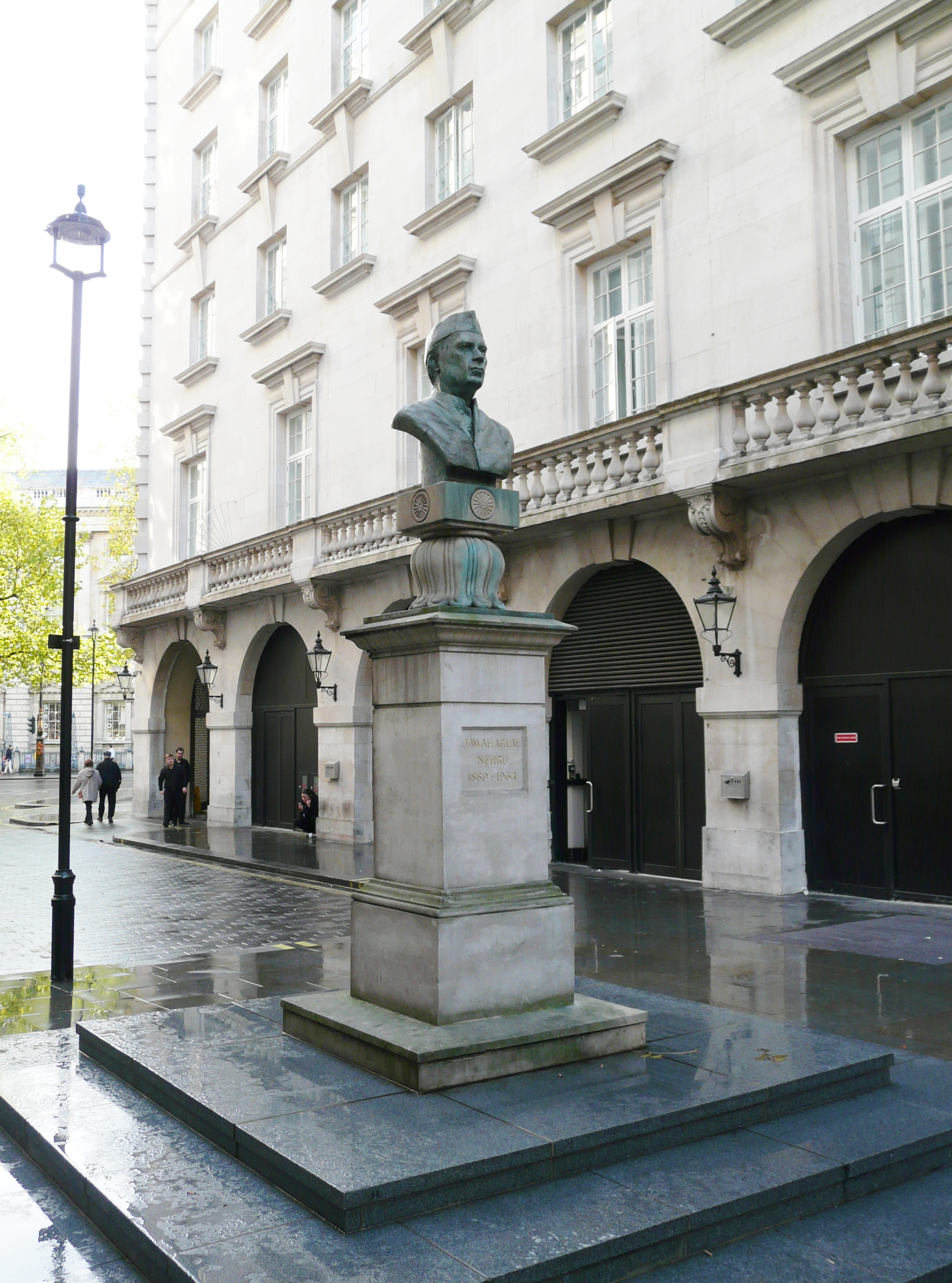
Bust of Nehru at Aldwych, London

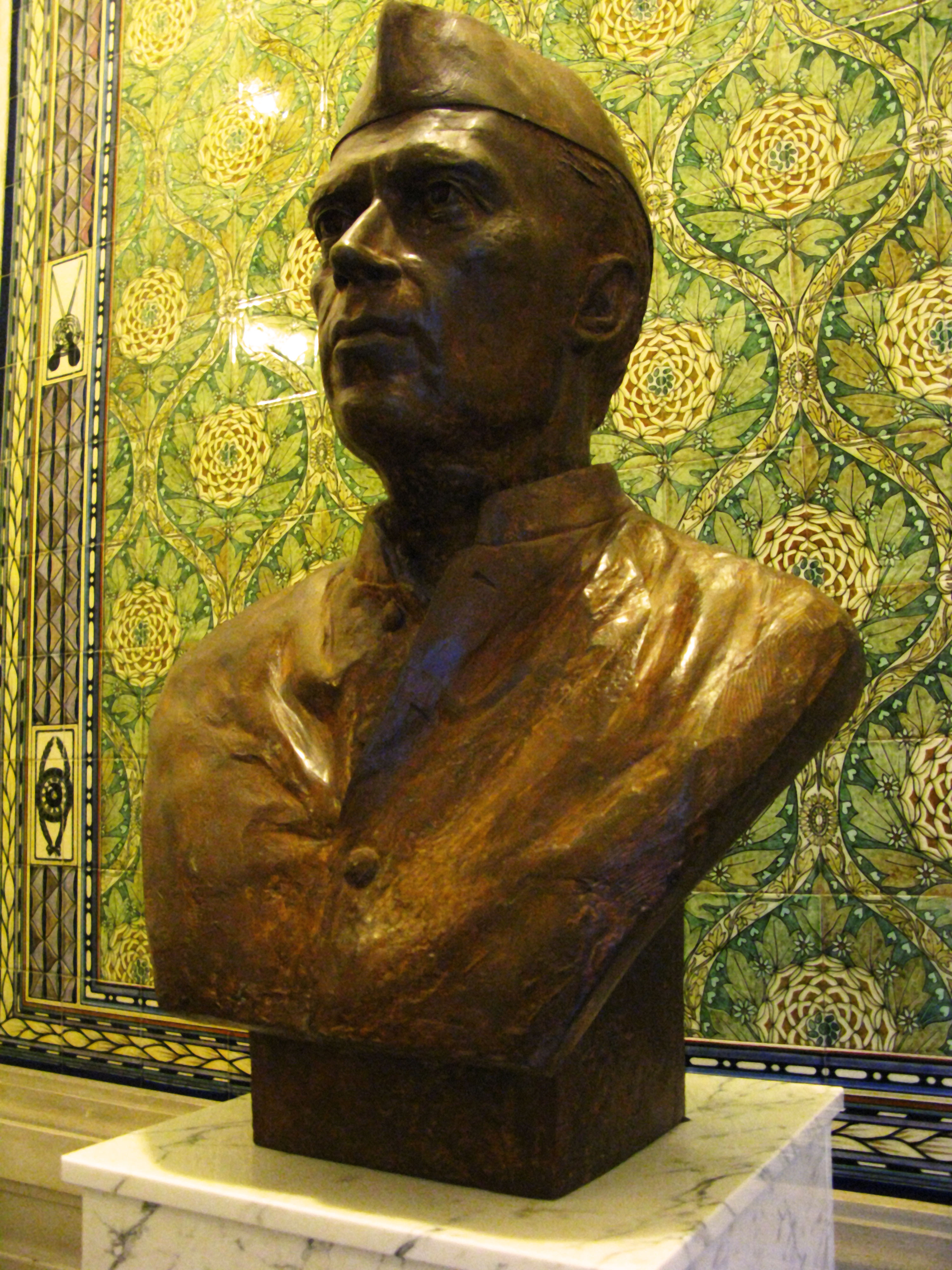
Bust of Nehru at Peace Palace, The Hague

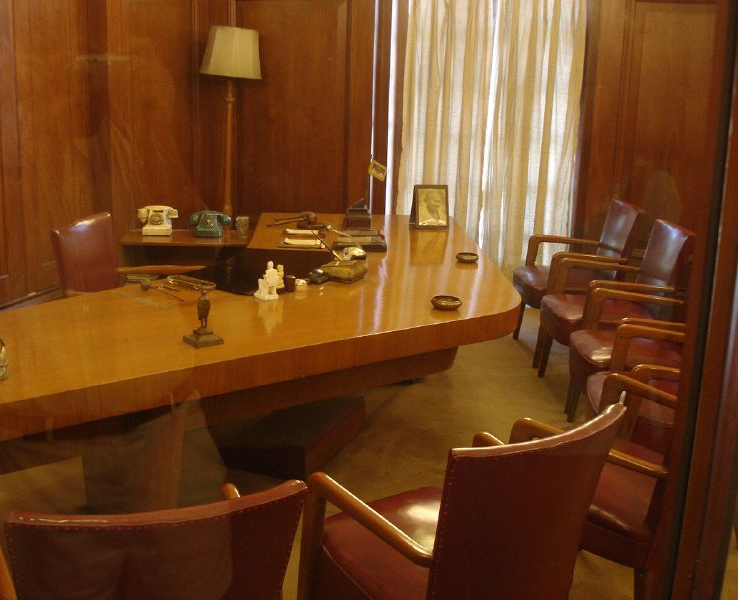
Nehru's study in Teen Murti Bhavan, which is now converted into a museum.

=== Commemoration ===
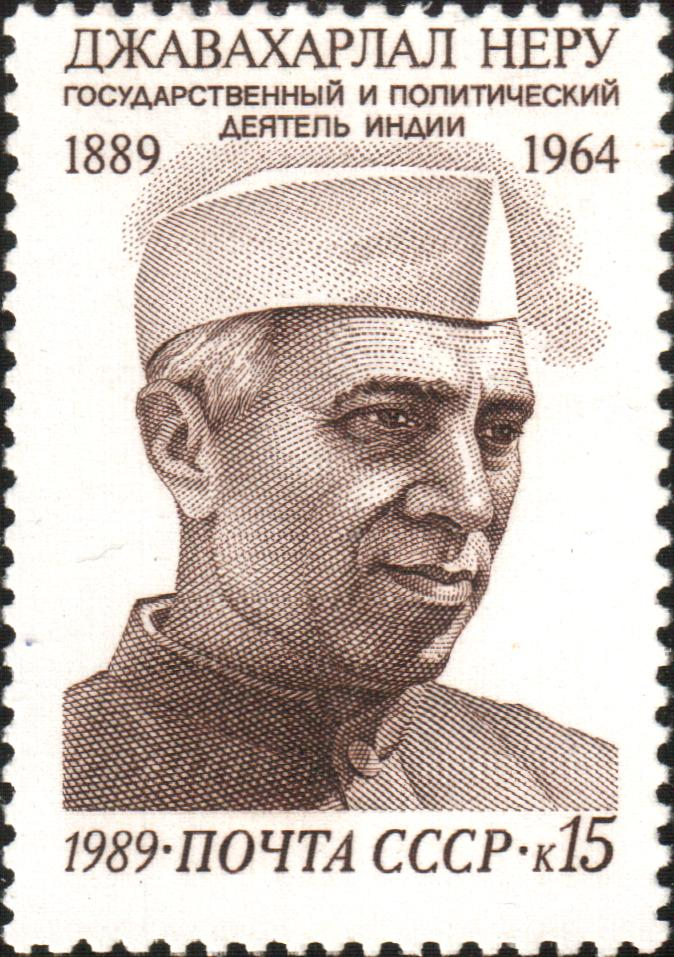
Nehru on a 1989 USSR commemorative stamp

In his lifetime, Jawaharlal Nehru enjoyed an iconic status in India and was generally admired across the world for his idealism and statesmanship. The honorific Pandit, meaning Wise One, has been applied before his name since his lifetime. Nehru's ideals and policies continue shaping the Congress Party's manifesto and core political philosophy. His birthday, 14 November is celebrated in India as Bal Divas ("Children's Day") in recognition of his lifelong passion and work for the welfare, education and development of children and young people. Children across India remember him as Chacha Nehru ("Uncle Nehru"). Nehru remains a popular symbol of the Congress Party which frequently celebrates his memory. People often emulate his style of clothing, especially the Gandhi cap and the Nehru jacket. Nehru's preference for the sherwani ensured it continues to be considered formal wear in North India today.

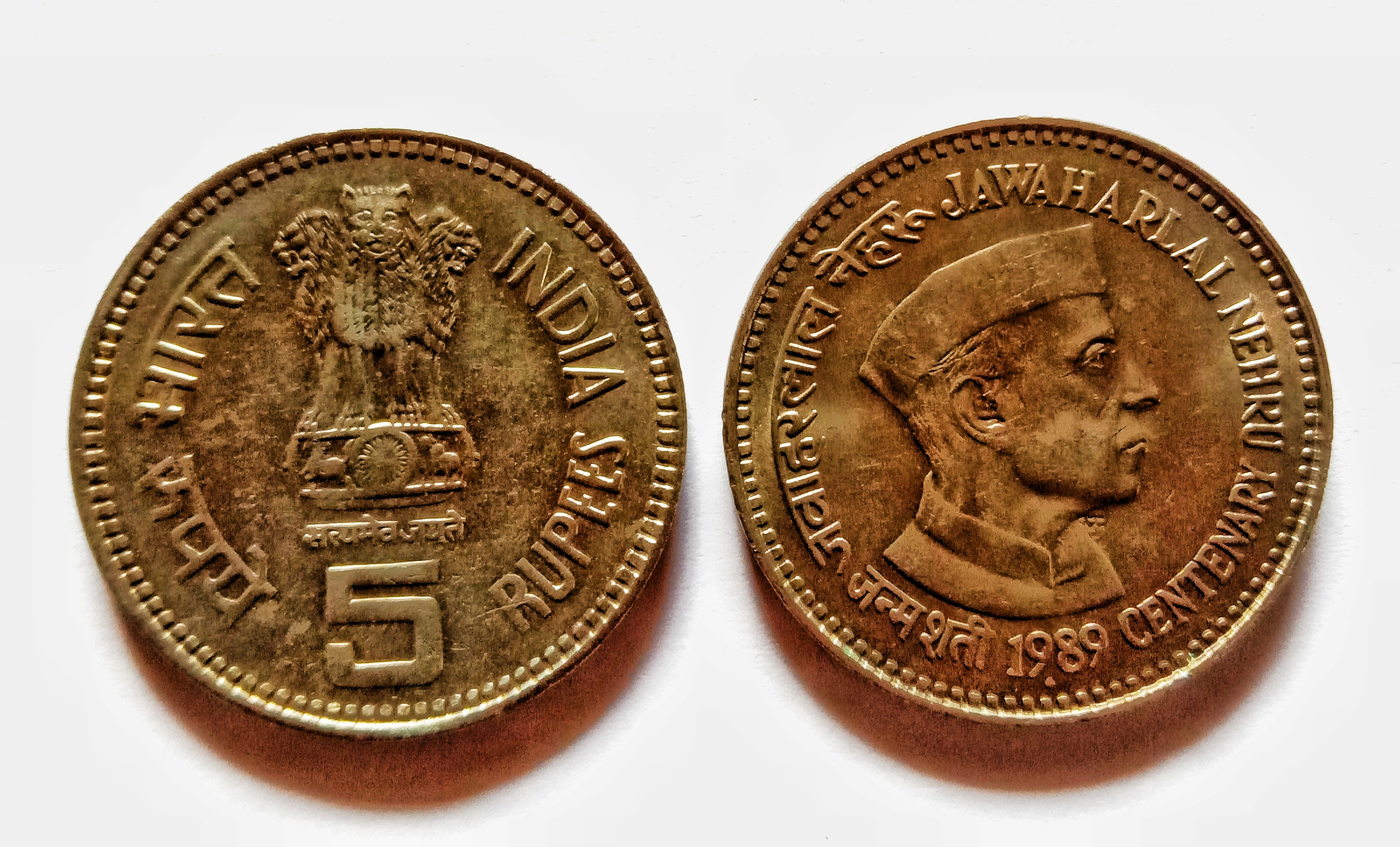
Indian 5 rupees coin, commemorating the birth centenary of Nehru in 1989.

Many public institutions and memorials across India are dedicated to Nehru's memory. The Jawaharlal Nehru University in Delhi is among the most prestigious universities in India. The Jawaharlal Nehru Port near the city of Mumbai is a modern port and dock designed to handle a huge cargo and traffic load. Nehru's residence in Delhi is preserved as the Teen Murti House now has the Nehru Memorial Museum & Library, and one of five Nehru Planetariums that were set in Mumbai, Delhi, Bangalore, Allahabad and Pune. The complex also houses the offices of the Jawaharlal Nehru Memorial Fund, established in 1964 under the chairmanship of Sarvepalli Radhakrishnan, then president of India. The foundation also gives away the prestigious Jawaharlal Nehru Memorial Fellowship, established in 1968. The Nehru family homes at Anand Bhavan and Swaraj Bhavan are also preserved to commemorate Nehru and his family's legacy. In 1997, Nehru was voted as the greatest Indian since independence in India Today' poll. In 2012, he ranked number four in Outlook's poll of The Greatest Indian. In 2010, he ranked among Britannica's The 100 Most Influential World Leaders of All Time.

=== In popular culture ===
There have been many documentaries about Nehru's life, and he has been portrayed in fictionalised films. The canonical performance is probably that of Roshan Seth, who played him three times: in Richard Attenborough's 1982 film Gandhi, Shyam Benegal's 1988 television series Bharat Ek Khoj, based on Nehru's The Discovery of India, and in a 2007 TV film entitled The Last Days of the Raj. Benegal directed the 1984 documentary film, Nehru, covering his political career. Indian film director Kiran Kumar made a film about Nehru titled Nehru: The Jewel of India in 1990 starring Partap Sharma in the titular role. In Ketan Mehta's film Sardar, Benjamin Gilani portrayed Nehru. Naunihal (lit. 'Young man'), a 1967 Indian Hindi-language drama film by Raj Marbros, follows Raju, an orphan, who believes that Jawaharlal Nehru is his relative and sets out to meet him.

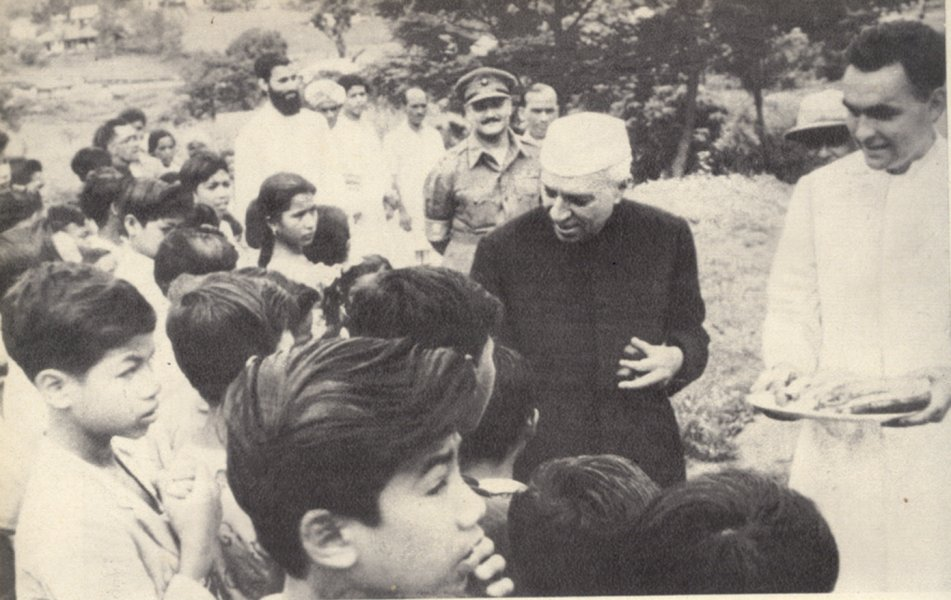
Nehru distributes sweets among children at Nongpoh, Meghalaya

Similarly, in the 1957 film Ab Dilli Dur Nahin (lit. 'Now Delhi Is Not Far Away') by Amar Kumar, Rattan, a young boy, travels to Delhi and seeks to avert the death sentence of his wrongly convicted father by asking Prime Minister Nehru for help. Another 1957 English language short documentary, Our Prime Minister, was produced, compiled and directed by Ezra Mir, who also directed Three Weeks in the Life of Prime Minister Nehru in 1962. Girish Karnad's historical play, Tughlaq (1962), is an allegory about the Nehruvian era. It was staged by Ebrahim Alkazi with the National School of Drama Repertory at Purana Qila, Delhi in the 1970s and later at the Festival of India, London, in 1982. Sidhant Gupta plays Jawaharlal Nehru in the 2024 web series Freedom at Midnight.

== Writings ==
Nehru was a prolific writer in English who wrote The Discovery of India, Glimpses of World History, An Autobiography (released in the United States as Toward Freedom), and Letters from a Father to His Daughter, all written in jail. Letters comprised thirty letters written to his daughter Indira Priyadarshani Nehru (later Gandhi) who was then ten years old and studying at a boarding school in Mussoorie. It attempted to instruct her about natural history and world civilisations. Nehru, as PM, wrote biweekly letters to Chief Ministers of the states from 1947 to 1964.

Nehru's books have been widely read. An Autobiography, in particular, has been critically acclaimed. John Gunther, writing in Inside Asia, contrasted it with Gandhi's autobiography:

The Mahatma's placid story compares to Nehru's as a cornflower to an orchid, a rhyming couplet to a sonnet by MacLeish or Auden, a water pistol to a machine gun. Nehru's autobiography is subtle, complex, discriminating, infinitely cultivated, steeped in doubt, suffused with intellectual passion. Lord Halifax once said that no one could understand India without reading it; it is a kind of 'Education of Henry Adams,' written in superlative prose—hardly a dozen men alive write English as well as Nehru ...

Michael Brecher, who considered Nehru to be an intellectual for whom ideas were important aspects of Indian nationalism, wrote in Political Leadership and Charisma: Nehru, Ben-Gurion, and Other 20th-Century Political Leaders:

Nehru's books were not scholarly, nor were they intended to be. He was not a trained historian, but his feel for the flow of events and his capacity to weave together a wide range of knowledge in a meaningful pattern give to his books qualities of a high order. In these works, he also revealed a sensitive literary style. ... Glimpses of World History is the most illuminating on Nehru as an intellectual. The first of the trilogy, Glimpses, was a series of thinly connected sketches of the story of mankind in the form of letters to his teenage daughter, Indira, later prime minister of India. ... Despite its polemical character in many sections and its shortcomings as an impartial history, Glimpses is a work of great artistic value, a worthy precursor of his noble and magnanimous Autobiography.

Michael Crocker thought An Autobiography would have given Nehru literary fame had the political fame eluded him:

It is to his years in prison that we owe his three main books, ... Nehru's writings illustrate a cerebral life, and a power of self-discipline, altogether out of the ordinary. Words by the million bubbled up out of his fullness of mind and spirit. Had he never been prime minister of India he would have been famous as the author of the Autobiography and the autobiographical parts of The Discovery of India. An Autobiography, at least with some excisions here and there, is likely to be read for generations. ... There are, for instance, the characteristic touches of truism and anticlimax, strange in a man who could both think and, at his best, write so well ...

Nehru's speech "Tryst with Destiny" was rated by the British newspaper The Guardian to be among the great speeches of the 20th century. Ian Jack wrote in his introduction to the speech:

Dressed in a golden silk jacket with a red rose in the buttonhole, Nehru rose to speak. His sentences were finely made and memorable—Nehru was a good writer; his Discovery of India stands well above the level reached by most politician-writers. ... The nobility of Nehru's words—their sheer sweep—provided the new India with a lodestone that was ambitious and humane. Post-colonialism began here as well as Indian democracy, which has since outlived many expectations of its death.

== See also ==
- Foreign relations of India
- List of political families
- List of national presidents of the Indian National Congress
- List of Indian writers
- Scientific temper, a phrase popularised by Nehru
- List of heads of state and government who died in office
- List of heads of state and government Nobel nominees

== Bibliography ==
- Gopal, S. and Uma Iyengar, eds. The Essential Writings of Jawaharlal Nehru (Oxford University Press, 2003) ISBN 978-0-19-565324-3
- Autobiography: Toward freedom, Oxford University Press
- Letters for a Nation: From Jawaharlal Nehru to His Chief Ministers 1947–1963 (Penguin UK, 2015).
- Letters from a father to his daughter by Jawaharlal Nehru, Children's Book Trust
- Independence and After: A collection of the more important speeches of Jawaharlal Nehru from September 1946 to May 1949 (1949). Delhi: The Publications Division, Government of India.
- "A Tryst with Destiny" – Historic speech made by Jawaharlal Nehru on 14 August 1947
- Baru, Sanjaya (2021). India's Power Elite: Class, Caste and Cultural Revolution. Penguin Random House India Private Limited. ISBN 978-93-90914-76-0. "Prime Minister Modi decided to alter the character of the premises as part of his campaign to liberate India from the Nehruvian intellectual inheritance."
- Brown, Judith M. (1984). "The Mountbatten Viceroyalty. Announcement and Reception of the 3 June Plan, 31 May–7 July 1947". The English Historical Review. 99 (392): 667–668. doi:10.1093/ehr/XCIX.CCCXCII.667.
- Lumby, E.W.R. (1954). The Transfer of Power in India, 1945–1947. London: George Allen and Unwin.
- Zachariah, Benjamin (2004). Nehru. Taylor & Francis. ISBN 978-1-134-57739-2.

Political offices
New office	Prime Minister of India; 15 August 1947 – 27 May 1964	Succeeded by Gulzarilal Nanda; Acting
New office	Union Minister of External Affairs; 2 September 1946 – 27 May 1964	Succeeded by Gulzarilal Nanda; Acting
New office	Chairperson of the Planning Commission; 15 March 1950 – 27 May 1964	Succeeded by Gulzarilal Nanda; Acting
Preceded by N. Gopalaswami Ayyangar	Union Minister of Defence; 27 January 1953 – 10 January 1955	Succeeded by Kailash Nath Katju
Preceded by Chintaman Dwarakanath Deshmukh	Union Minister of Finance; 1956	Succeeded by Tiruvellore Thattai Krishnamachariar
Preceded by Kailash Nath Katju	Union Minister of Defence; 30 January 1957 – 17 April 1957	Succeeded by Vengalil Krishnan Krishna Menon
Preceded by Tiruvellore Thattai Krishnamachariar	Union Minister of Finance; 1958	Succeeded by Morarji Desai
Preceded by Vengalil Krishnan Krishna Menon	Union Minister of Defence; 1 November 1962 – 21 November 1962	Succeeded by Yashwantrao Chavan
