= Cultural depictions of Jawaharlal Nehru =

Jawaharlal Nehru
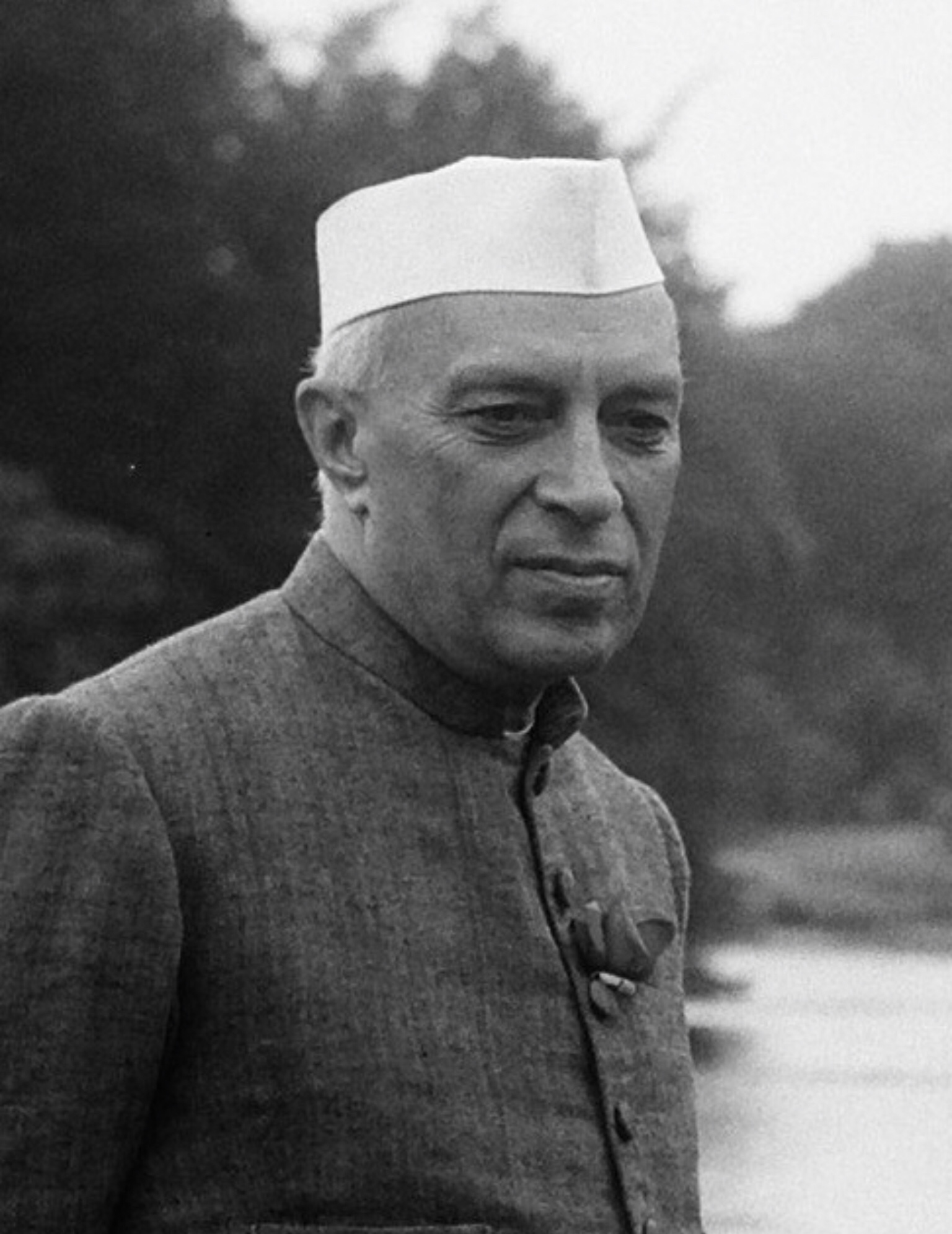
- Portrait, 1957

Prime Minister of India
- In office 15 August 1947 – 27 May 1964
- Prime Minister: Himself
- Preceded by: Office established
- Succeeded by: Gulzarilal Nanda

Personal details
- Born: 14 November 1889 Allahabad, North-Western Provinces, India
- Died: 27 May 1964 (aged 74) New Delhi, India
- Resting place: Shantivan
- Party: Indian National Congress
- Spouse: Kamala Kaul (m. 1916; died 1936)
- Children: Indira Gandhi
- Parents: Motilal Nehru; Swarup Rani Nehru
- Relatives: Nehru–Gandhi family
- Education: Harrow School; Trinity College, Cambridge; Inner Temple
- Occupation: Lawyer; Politician

India's first Prime Minister Jawahar Lal Nehru has always been a center of attention for art and culture as well. Many films and Television shows have been created around him. Similarly, many books and articles have been written about him, and about various aspects related with his life.

== Films and televisions ==
There have been many documentaries about Nehru's life, and he has been portrayed in fictionalised films. The canonical performance is probably that of Roshan Seth, who played him three times: in Richard Attenborough's 1982 film Gandhi, Shyam Benegal's 1988 television series Bharat Ek Khoj, based on Nehru's The Discovery of India, and in a 2007 TV film entitled The Last Days of the Raj. Benegal directed the 1984 documentary film, Nehru, covering his political career. Indian film director Kiran Kumar made a film about Nehru titled Nehru: The Jewel of India in 1990 starring Partap Sharma in the titular role. In Ketan Mehta's film Sardar, Benjamin Gilani portrayed Nehru. Naunihal (lit. 'Young man'), a 1967 Indian Hindi-language drama film by Raj Marbros, follows Raju, an orphan, who believes that Jawaharlal Nehru is his relative and sets out to meet him.

Similarly, in the 1957 film Ab Dilli Dur Nahin (lit. 'Now Delhi is not far away') by Amar Kumar, Rattan, a young boy, travels to Delhi and seeks to avert the death sentence of his wrongly convicted father by asking Prime Minister Nehru for help. Another 1957 English language short documentary Our Prime Minister was produced, compiled and directed by Ezra Mir, who also directed Three Weeks in the Life of Prime Minister Nehru in 1962. Girish Karnad's historical play, Tughlaq (1962) is an allegory about the Nehruvian era. It was staged by Ebrahim Alkazi with the National School of Drama Repertory at Purana Qila, Delhi in the 1970s and later at the Festival of India, London in 1982.

== Books and biographies ==
Many books and biographies have been written about Nehru.

One of the most exhaustive work on Nehru has been written by Sarvepalli Gopal, son of India's first Vice President Sarvapalli Radhakrishnan. He wrote Nehru's life in three volumes. Jawaharlal Nehru: A Biography Volume 1 1889–1947 was published in 1975 and Jawaharlal Nehru" A Biography Vol. 2 1947–1956 was published in 1979. The third part Jawaharlal Nehru: A Biography Volume 3 1956–1964 was published posthumously in 2014.

Frank Moraes, an editor of many prominent newspapers, including The Times of India and The Indian Express, and a close observer of Nehru had written a biography on him by title Jawaharlal Nehru: A Biography in 1956. Later in 1964, he wrote another book on Nehru titled "Nehru, Sunlight and Shadow".

Bal Ram Nanda, an Indian historian and biographer, wrote the book The Nehrus: Motilal and Jawaharlal published in 1963.

Jawaharlal Nehru (1993) by Sankar Ghosh is another book on Nehru.

An important writing was by Rudrangshu Mukherjee, who wrote Nehru & Bose: Parallel Lives, published in 2014, which the Frontline magazine called "a beautifully wrought masterpiece".
