= Clean Break =

Clean Break may refer to:

== Film and TV ==
- Clean Break (film), a 2008 American film
- Clean Break (TV series), a 2015 Irish crime TV mini-series
- "Clean Break" (New Girl), a 2015 episode of the American TV series New Girl
- "My Clean Break", a 2004 episode of the American sitcom Scrubs

== Music ==
- "A Clean Break (Let's Work)", a song by Talking Heads from the 1982 album The Name of This Band Is Talking Heads
- "Clean Break", a song by The Verve Pipe from the 1995 album I've Suffered a Head Injury
- "Clean Break", a song by Axium from the 2003 album Blindsided

== Literature ==
- Clean Break, a 1955 novel by Lionel White, basis for the film The Killing
- A Clean Break, a 1993 novel by Anne Melville
- Clean Break, a 1995 novel by Val McDermid
- Clean Break (novel), a 2005 fiction book by British children's author Jacqueline Wilson

== Other uses ==
- A Clean Break: A New Strategy for Securing the Realm, a 1996 policy recommendation report presented to Benyamin Netanyahu, the then-Prime Minister of Israel
- Ancillary relief, the "clean break" settlement of a divorce by awarding a single capital sum, as opposed to requiring periodic payments
  - White v White, a landmark "clean break" settlement in the United Kingdom
- Clean Break, a blog published by Toronto Star reporter/business columnist Tyler Hamilton
- Clean Break (theatre company), a British feminist theatre company founded in 1979
- Clean-break Brexit, the potential withdrawal of the UK from the European Union (EU) without a withdrawal agreement
- Clean Break speech, speech by Mahatma Gandhi about British colonialism in India, see Speeches about Indian independence
