= Nehru Park =

Nehru Park may refer to these parks in India named after the first Indian prime minister Jawaharlal Nehru:

- Nehru Park, Burnpur, located in Burnpur, West Bengal, India
- Nehru Park, Chennai, at Egmore in Chennai, India
  - Nehru Park metro station
- Nehru Park, Delhi (established 1969), at Chanakyapuri in New Delhi, India
- Nehru Park, Guwahati, located in Guwahati, Assam, India
- Nehru Park, Paravur, public park in Paravur, Kollam Metropolitan Area, Kerala, India
- Nehru Park, Thrissur, Thrissur, Kerala, India
- Kamala Nehru Park, Mumbai, located in Mumbai's Malabar Hill, India
- Kamala Nehru Park, Pune, located in Pune, Maharashtra, India
- Nehru Zoological Park large zoo located in Hyderabad, Andhra Pradesh, India

== See also ==
- Nehru (disambiguation)
