= Nehru (disambiguation) =

Jawaharlal Nehru was a 20th-century politician and statesman who served as Prime Minister of India.

Nehru may also refer to:

== People ==
- Nehru family, a political family in India
  - Arun Nehru, Indian politician and columnist
  - Braj Kumar Nehru, Indian diplomat
  - Brijlal Nehru, Indian civil servant
  - Fori Nehru, Hungarian-born Indian social worker
  - K. N. Nehru, Indian politician
  - Motilal Nehru, Indian lawyer and politician, father of Jawaharlal
  - Ratan Kumar Nehru, Indian civil servant
  - Uma Nehru, Indian independence activis
- Devineni Nehru, Indian politician
- Bishop Nehru, American rapper

== Places ==
- Nehru Centre, a building in Mumbai
- Nehru Enclave metro station, Delhi, India
- Nehru Place, marketplace of Delhi, India
  - Nehru Place metro station
- Jawaharlal Nehru Port, second largest container port in India

== Miscellaneous ==
- Nehru (film), a 1984 Indian English-language documentary film about the prime minister
- Nehru Cup, international football tournament
- Nehru Report, during British colonial rule in India, demanding self-government
- Nehru jacket, tailored coat based on the prime minister's style

== See also ==
- List of things named after Jawaharlal Nehru
- Nehruism, liberal socialist ideology of Jawaharlal Nehru
- NehruvianDoom, an album by the rapper Bishop Nehru
- Neru (disambiguation)
- Nehru ministry (disambiguation)
- Nehru Park (disambiguation)
- Jawaharlal Nehru University (disambiguation)
- Jawaharlal Nehru Technological University (disambiguation)
- Jawaharlal Nehru Medical College (disambiguation)
- Jawaharlal Nehru Stadium (disambiguation)
