= Eulogy =

Speeches in praise of a person, usually recently deceased

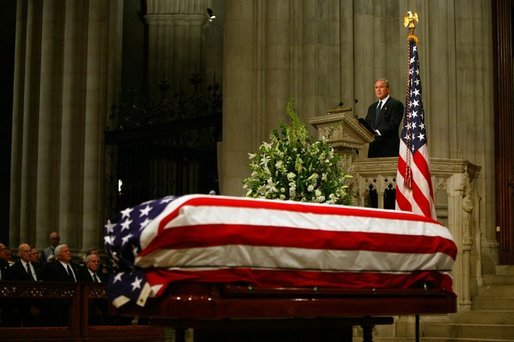
George W. Bush delivers the eulogy at Ronald Reagan's state funeral, June 2004.

A eulogy is a speech or writing in praise of a person, especially one who recently died or retired, or as a term of endearment. (Note: Bush, George W. (2004-06-11). "President Bush's Eulogy at Funeral Service for President Reagan". National Archives and Records Administration.) (Note: "Eulogy Speech Guide". Eulogyspeech.net.) The word comes from the Classical Greek εὐλογία, eulogia, meaning 'praise', from eu 'well, true' and logia 'words, text'.

Eulogies may be given as part of funeral services. In the United States, they take place in a funeral home during or after a wake; in the United Kingdom, they are said during the service, typically at a crematorium or place of worship, before the wake. In the United States, some denominations either discourage or do not permit eulogies at services to maintain respect for traditions. Eulogies can also praise people who are still alive. This normally takes place on special occasions like birthdays, office parties, retirement celebrations, etc. Eulogies should not be confused with elegies, which are poems written in tribute to the dead; nor with obituaries, which are published biographies recounting the lives of those who have recently died; nor with obsequies, which refer generally to the rituals surrounding funerals. Roman Catholic priests are prohibited by the rubrics of the Mass from presenting a eulogy for the deceased in place of a homily during a funeral Mass. (Note: "General Inststruction of the Roman Missal". The Holy See. Ch. VIII, § II, #382.)

The modern use of the word eulogy was first documented in the 16th century and came from the Medieval Latin term eulogium. Eulogium at that time has since turned into the shorter eulogy of today.

Eulogies are usually delivered by a family member or a close family friend in the case of a dead person. (Note: "How to give a funeral speech". Inspirational Eulogy.) For a living eulogy given in such cases as a retirement, a senior colleague could perhaps deliver it. On occasions, eulogies are given to those who are severely ill or elderly in order to express words of love and gratitude before they die. Eulogies are not limited to merely people, however; places or things can also be given eulogies (which anyone can deliver), but these are less common than those delivered to people, whether living or deceased.

In some cases, a self-eulogy is written before the subject dies, with the aim of having a friend or family member read out their words to the funeral mass. Notable examples include the uplifting self-eulogy of American writer Kurt Vonnegut (borrowed from his uncle's own funeral) and a humorous self-eulogy by Australian rules footballer and media personality Lou Richards, which was read by a friend.

== Notable examples ==
A successful eulogy may provide comfort, inspiration, or establish a connection to the person of whom the eulogy is in behalf. The following examples are well-known eulogies that have done just that.

President Ronald Reagan’s eulogy for the Challenger space shuttle crew (1986):

I know it is hard to understand, but sometimes painful things like this happen. It’s all part of the process of exploration and discovery. It’s all part of taking a chance and expanding man’s horizons. The future doesn’t belong to the fainthearted; it belongs to the brave. The Challenger crew was pulling us into the future, and we’ll continue to follow them.

Charles Spencer’s eulogy for his sister, Diana, Princess of Wales (1997):

Diana was the very essence of compassion, of duty, of style, of beauty. All over the world she was a symbol of selfless humanity, a standard-bearer for the rights of the truly downtrodden, a truly British girl who transcended nationality, someone with a natural nobility who was classless, who proved in the last year that she needed no royal title to continue to generate her particular brand of magic.

Jawaharlal Nehru’s eulogy for Mahatma Gandhi (1948):

The first thing to remember now is that no one of us dare misbehave because we’re angry. We have to behave like strong and determined people, determined to face all the perils that surround us, determined to carry out the mandate that our great teacher and our great leader had given us, remembering always that if, as I believe, his spirit looks upon us and sees you, nothing would displease his soul so much as to see that we have indulged in any small behavior or any violence. So we must not do that. But that does not mean that we should be weak, but rather that we should in strength and in unity face all the troubles and difficulties and conflicts must be ended in the face of this great disaster. A great disaster is a symbol to us to remember all the big things of life and forget the small things, of which we have thought too much.

Ted Kennedy's eulogy for his brother Robert F. Kennedy (1968):

My brother need not be idealized, or enlarged in death beyond what he was in life; to be remembered simply as a good and decent man, who saw wrong and tried to right it, saw suffering and tried to heal it, saw war and tried to stop it.

Those of us who loved him and who take him to his rest today, pray that what he was to us and what he wished for others will some day come to pass for all the world.

As he said many times, in many parts of this nation, to those he touched and who sought to touch him: Some men see things as they are and say why; I dream things that never were and say why not.

== Content ==
There are many different types of eulogies. Some of them are strictly meant to be a biography of the person's life. The short biography is simply a retelling of what the individual went through in their life. This can be done to highlight major points in the deceased's life. Another version is by telling a more personal view on what the individual did. It entails retelling memories that are shared between the storyteller and the deceased. Memories, impressions, and experiences are all things that can be included in a retelling of the personal eulogy (Burch, 2006). In most parts of the world, eulogies mostly focus on the biography of the person's life by highlighting the major events of their lives, such as work or career, education, etc.

== See also ==
- Consolatio
- Funeral celebrant
- Funeral oration (ancient Greece)
- Panegyric
