= JNT =

JNT may refer to:

- Jawaharlal Nehru Technological University (disambiguation), in Indian cities
- JNT Association, later JANET, computer network
- Junctionless nanowire transistor
- Windows Journal file extension
- John Nathan-Turner, former Doctor Who producer
