= G. Devarajan =

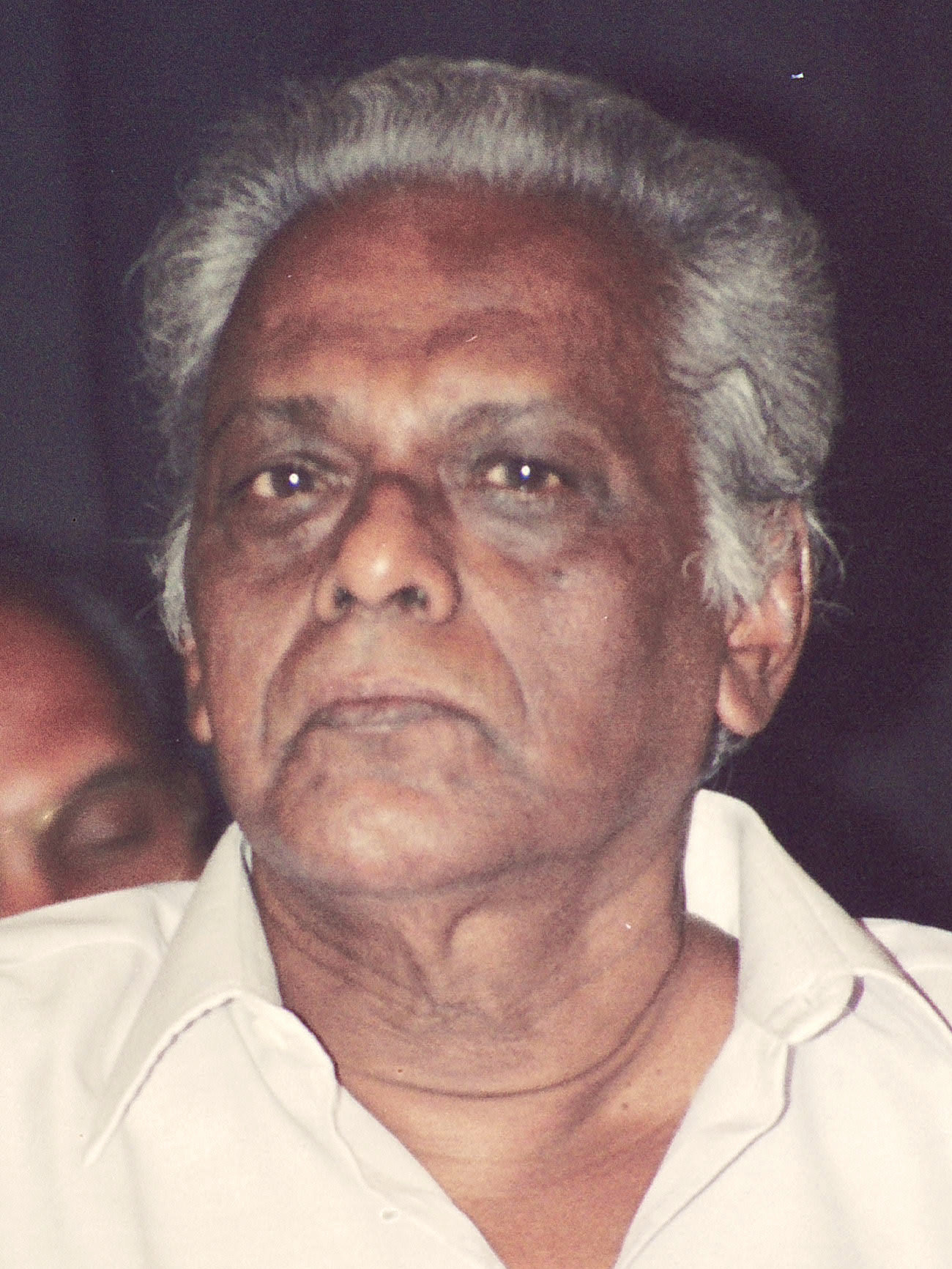

Background information
- Born: 27 September 1927; Paravur, Travancore (present day Kerala), India
- Died: 14 March 2006 (aged 78) Chennai, India
- Genres: Film music, stage play music, Carnatic music
- Occupations: Film composer, Carnatic singer
- Instruments: Harmonium, Mridangam, Veena
- Years active: 1948–2006
- Labels: His Master's Voice, Odeon, Angel, Tharangini Records

Paravoor Govindan Devarajan (1927–2006), popularly known as G. Devarajan or Devarajan master, was an Indian music composer and Carnatic vocalist. He is widely regarded as one of the greatest composers in the history of Malayalam film music, as well as being a highly respected figure among South Indian film musicians as a whole. He scored music for more than 300 Malayalam films, many dramas, and twenty Tamil and four Kannada movies. His collaborations with the lyricist Vayalar Ramavarma produced the golden era of Malayalam film music and many of his compositions remain evergreen classics in Malayalam. His music in the Tamil film Annai Velankanni has received many accolades. Devarajan received Kerala Government's Best Music Director award five times, among other honours. In 1999, he was honoured with the J. C. Daniel Award, Kerala government's highest honour for contributions to Malayalam cinema.

== Early life ==
Devarajan was born on 27 September 1927 at Paravur, near Kollam in then Travancore to mridangam player and classical singer Paravur N. Kochu Govindan Asan and Kochukunju as their eldest son. His grandfather, Narayanan Asan, was a Kathakali artist.

His dad, though he was a mridangam vidwan and a disciple of Dakshinamurthy Pillai, primarily taught vocal to his students, and thus Devarajan learned Carnatic vocal for around 12–13 years adeptly from his own father through that. He did his intermediate college at University College in Thiruvananthapuram from 1946 to 1948 and passed with First Class. He graduated with BA in Economics from Mahatma Gandhi College, Thiruvananthapuram.

Devarajan, under the name of Paravur Devarajan or Paravur G. Devaraj, started his illustrious career in music as a classical singer and performed his first classical concert at the age of 17 and started to perform more concerts on AIR Tiruchi and Trivandrum. He performed a number of classical concerts from 1945 to 1962 with multiple accompanists, his usual ones being Chalakudy Narayanaswamy and Mavelikara Krishnankutty Nair. At the end of his classical concerts, he used to set tunes to the poems of Ulloor Parameswaran Iyer, Kumaranasan, Changampuzha, G. Kumarapilla, O. N. V. Kurup, P. Bhaskaran, amongst many others.

He was soon attracted to the Communist movement and decided to dedicate his creative energy to popular music. He joined the once-famous drama troupe of Kerala, the Kerala People's Arts Club (KPAC). The work that brought him to the limelight was the drama song "Ponnarivaal ambiliyil kanneriyunnoole", written by his friend O. N. V. Kurup and composed and sung by himself. KPAC and its members had a distinctive leaning towards the communist ideology, and their dramas played a role in spreading the ideology among the Keralite masses. Through his compositions, Devarajan would cast an indelible imprint in the Malayali theatre arena, especially after the famous KPAC drama Ningalenne Communistaakki, written by Thoppil Bhasi in 1952.

== Film career ==
The first movie for which he composed music was Kaalam Maarunnu (1955). He teamed up with poet-lyricist Vayalar Ramavarma in Chathurangam in 1959. His third movie – and the second with Vayalar – Bharya (1962) became a huge hit and made them a popular combination. His collaborations with Vayalar produced the golden era of Malayalam film music. Devarajan is remembered by singers in Malayalam like K. J. Yesudas and Jayachandran as their Godfather.

Devarajan was known for his use of numerous raagas in Malayalam film music, using more than 100s of them in his compositions. His music embraced different styles with the Carnatic and Hindustani melody lines meeting folk idioms and Western harmony. Despite being a strong atheist, he composed devotional songs like "Harivarasanam", "Guruvayoor Ambalanadayil", "Chethi Mandaram Thulasi", and "Nithyavishudhayam Kanyamariyame", which are considered classics in that genre. Also, he is particularly noted for his remarkable ability to blend the words of the lyrics with the mood of the situation in his film song compositions, exercising self-restraint while writing songs for the uninitiated audience without relinquishing the magic of his poetry. Most of his hit songs were written by Vayalar Ramavarma. The Vayalar-Devarajan combine proved the most successful team till the death of Vayalar in the mid-1970s. Hundreds of songs contributed by the team are still part of Malayalis' nostalgia. Apart from Vayalar, he has also given tunes to lyrics by other poets and songwriters like O. N. V. Kurup, P. Bhaskaran, Sreekumaran Thampi and Bichu Thirumala. Devarajan was at one point in time regarded as the doyen of film music in South India. He was much feared and respected by all musicians and singers of that period, for his sound knowledge of Classical music. It might be due to this dominance he had over others that he was widely known as arrogant. But he enjoyed a royal status till his death in the music circles.

Yesudas, P Leela, P. Madhuri, P. Susheela, and P. Jayachandran sang most of his songs. He has sung with more than 130 singers. M. K. Arjunan, R. K. Shekhar, Johnson, Vidyasagar, Ouseppachan, Ilayaraja, A. R. Rahman and many others who later became famous as music directors worked as his assistants, conductors, and instrumentalists.

A complete work of Devarajan, Devageethikal, composed by himself, has released and the book is published by Authentic books.

Devarajan died of a massive heart attack at his residence in Chennai on 15 March 2006. He was 78 at the time of his death, and was survived by his wife, two children - a daughter (elder) and a son (younger) - and some grandchildren. His body was taken airway to Thiruvananthapuram, and was cremated with state honors at Nehru Park in Paravur, his hometown.

== Partial Filmography ==
Malayalam

- Omanakuttan (1964)
- Maram (1973)
- Bhoomidevi Pushpiniyayi (1974)
- Ammini Ammavan(1976)
- Vishnu Vijayam (1974)
- Chattakari (1974)
- Ponni (1976)
- Allauddinum Albhutha Vilakkum (1979)
- Shalini Ente Koottukari (1980)
- Meen (1980)
- Parankimala (1981)
- Mayooranritham (1996)

Tamil

- Kaaval Dheivam (1969)
- Kasturi Thilakam (1970)
- Annai Velankanni (1971)
- Paruva Kaalam (1974)
- Andharangam (1975)
- Villiyanur Matha (1983)
- Allauddinum Arputha Vilakkum (1979)

== Awards ==
Kerala State Film Awards:

- 1969 – Best Music Director
- 1970 – Best Music Director – Thriveni
- 1972 – Best Music Director
- 1985 – Best Music Director
- 1991 – Best Background Music – Yamanam
- 1999 – J. C. Daniel Award for Lifetime Achievement Award from the Government of Kerala

Kerala Film Critics Association Award

- 1977 - Kerala Film Critics Association Award for Best Music Director
- 1978 - Kerala Film Critics Association Award for Best Music Director
- 1979 - Kerala Film Critics Association Award for Best Music Director

Others

- 1980 - Kerala Sangeetha Nataka Akademi Fellowship
