= Our Prime Minister =

1957 Indian short documentary film

- Directed by: Ezra Mir
- Written by: Ezra Mir
- Screenplay by: Ezra Mir
- Produced by: Ezra Mir
- Starring: Jawaharlal Nehru
- Cinematography: N. S. Thapa; P. D. P. Rao; Indian News Reel Cameramen
- Edited by: U. K. Wadke
- Music by: V. Shirali
- Production company: Films Division of India
- Release date: 1957
- Running time: 22 min

Our Prime Minister is a 1957 Indian English language short biographical documentary film based on the life of Pandit Jawaharlal Nehru, the first Prime Minister of independent Republic of India. The film was produced, compiled and directed by Ezra Mir. It shows Nehru's daily activities, both his personal life with his family and professional duties as prime minister. Newsreel footage is intercut with footage shot specifically for the film.

== Reception ==
Screen, in 1964, referred to it as "very absorbing" and generally praised the views of Nehru's private life. With its release in 1957, a newspaper said that it "reflects great credit on our Films Division and in particular, its Chief Producer, Ezra Mir ... provides intimate shots of Jawaharlalji at work and at play". However, a more critical review claims it is artificial and overly positive to Nehru but does appreciate Mir's technical skill.

== See also ==
- "Tryst with Destiny" (1947 speech)
- "The light has gone out of our lives" (1948 speech)
- Nehru (1984 film)

== Bibliography ==
- Bajpai, Anandita (2018). Speaking the Nation: The Oratorical Making of Secular, Neoliberal India. New Delhi: Oxford University Press. pp. 59–60. doi:10.1093/oso/9780199481743.003.0002. ISBN 9780199481743.
