= Gowalia Tank =

Park in South Mumbai, India

Coordinates: 18°57′44.82″N 72°48′34.93″E

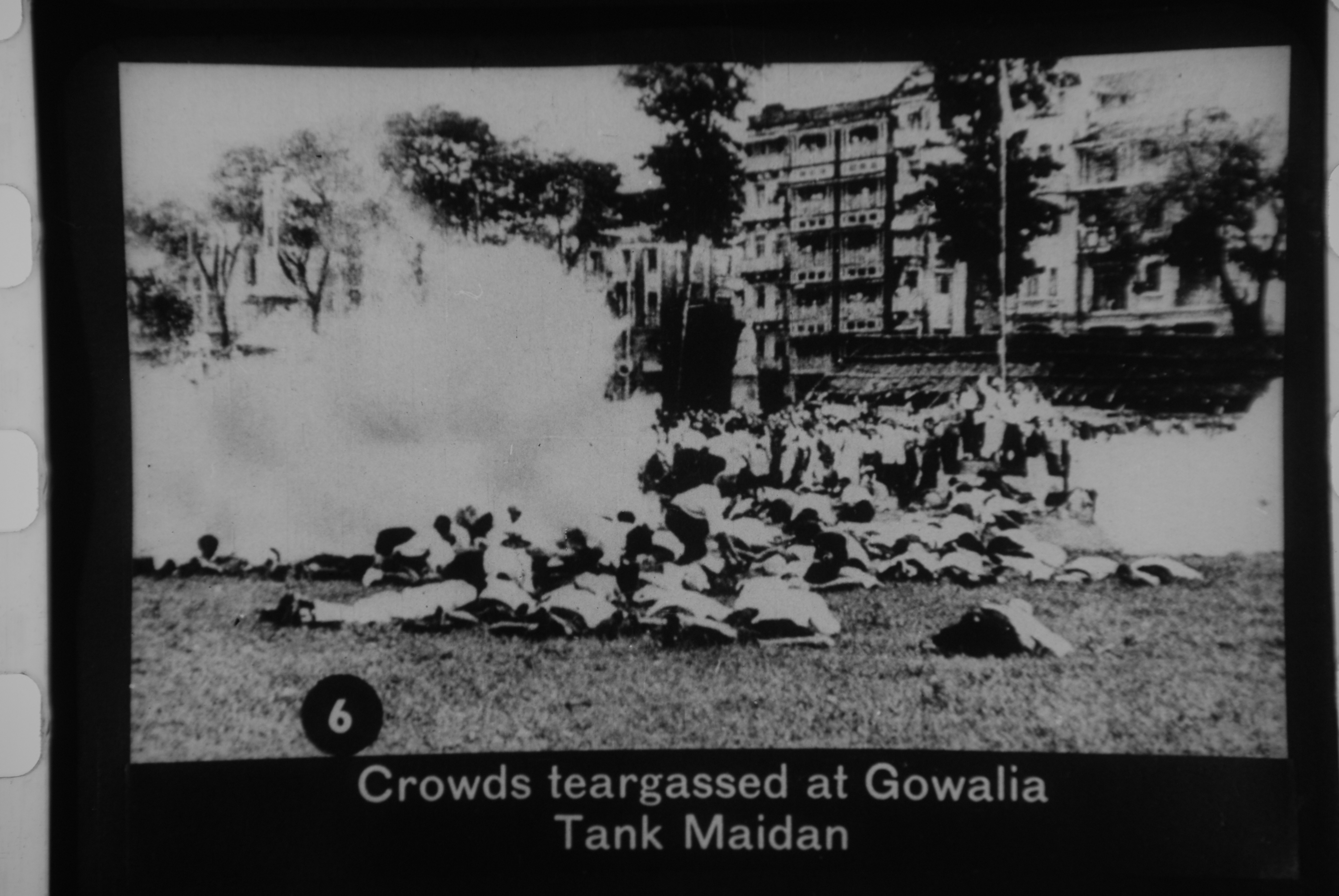
People teargassed at Gowalia Tank Maidan

Gowalia Tank Maidan, officially renamed August Kranti Maidan, is a park in Grant Road West, in South Mumbai, in which Mahatma Gandhi issued the Quit India speech on 8 August 1942. It decreed that unless the British left India immediately, mass agitations would take place.

== History ==
On August 7, 1942, the All India Congress Committee organized its session under the Presidentship of Maulana Azad, which continued past-midnight into the next day. The venue was the Gowalia Tank Maidan, which was located 250 metres away from Goculdas Tejpal House, the place where the Indian National Congress was established in December 1885. The next day (August 8. 1942), the call for "Quit India Movement" was given, with the mantra of "do or die."

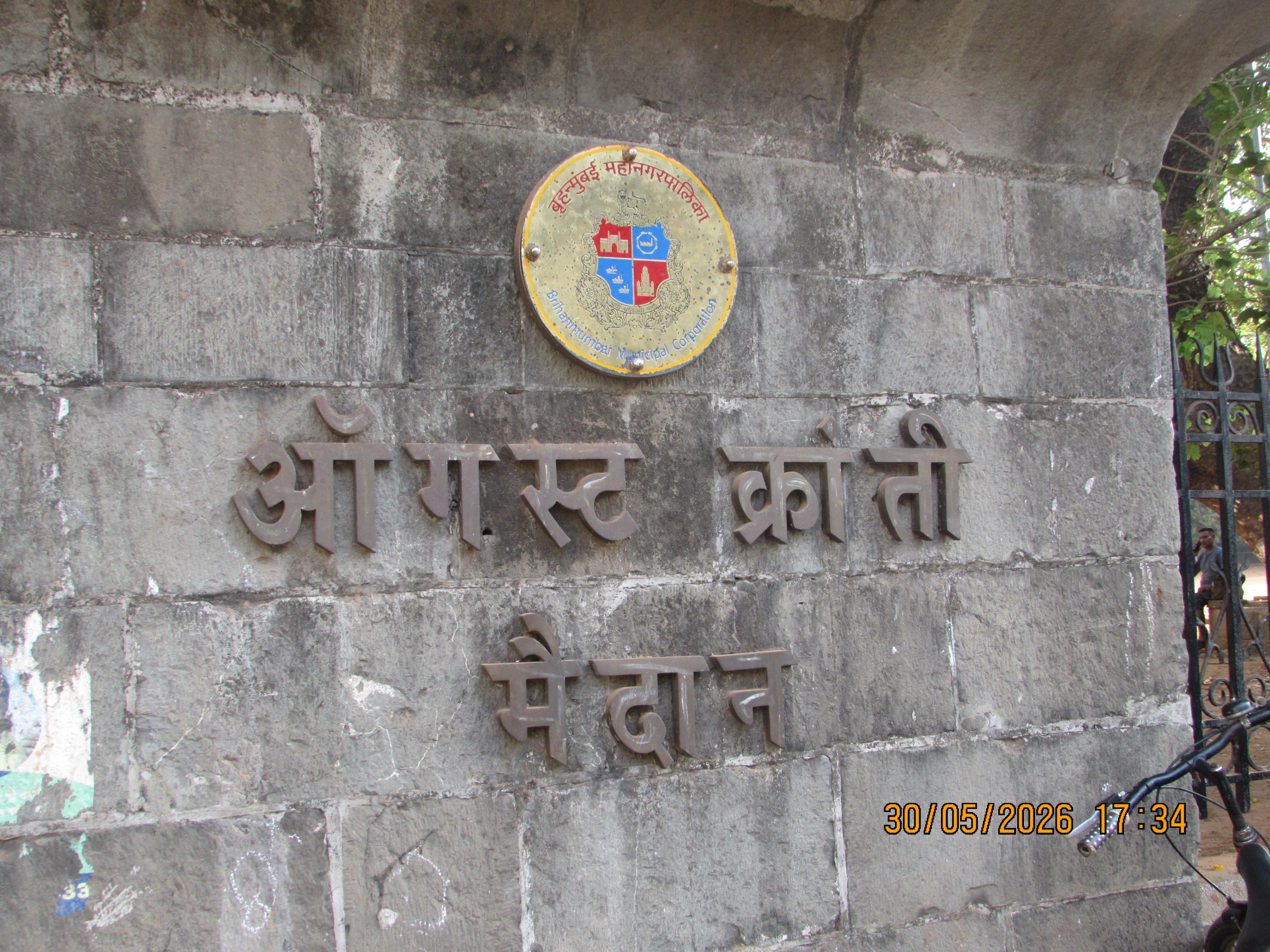
Entry gate of August Kranti Maidan

In the words of Gandhi "Here is a mantra, a short one, that I give you. You may imprint it on your hearts and let every breath of yours give expression to it. The mantra is: "Do or Die". We shall either free India or die in the attempt; we shall not live to see the perpetuation of our slavery". The call mobilised the citizens to a huge Civil Disobedience movement as the British refused to grant independence till the World War II (1939 to 1945) was over.

== Origin of the name ==
The Gowalia Tank was initially used to bathe cows. Go - Walia comes from the marathi/Gujarati word Gaie (cow) Wala (owner of the cattle). The cattle owners would bring the cows to be bathed in the waters of the tank. The Maidan that exists over there presently was built over the tank, which still exists underground. Gowalia Tank was also a very prominent tram terminus. Trams would start and finish there and one could travel to the Prince of Wales Museum in one anna (six paise).

== Current usage ==
The Maidan is now a popular playground. Cricket is the popular game although the monsoon season is primarily for football and volleyball. The ground has been split into 5 smaller grounds. The largest one is the playground, with one playground for children, one garden for promenades which is frequented by senior citizens and one ground is used by the Fellowship School. The last park area houses the Smarak or martyr monument which is a white marble tower that cradles a pink lotus atop it.

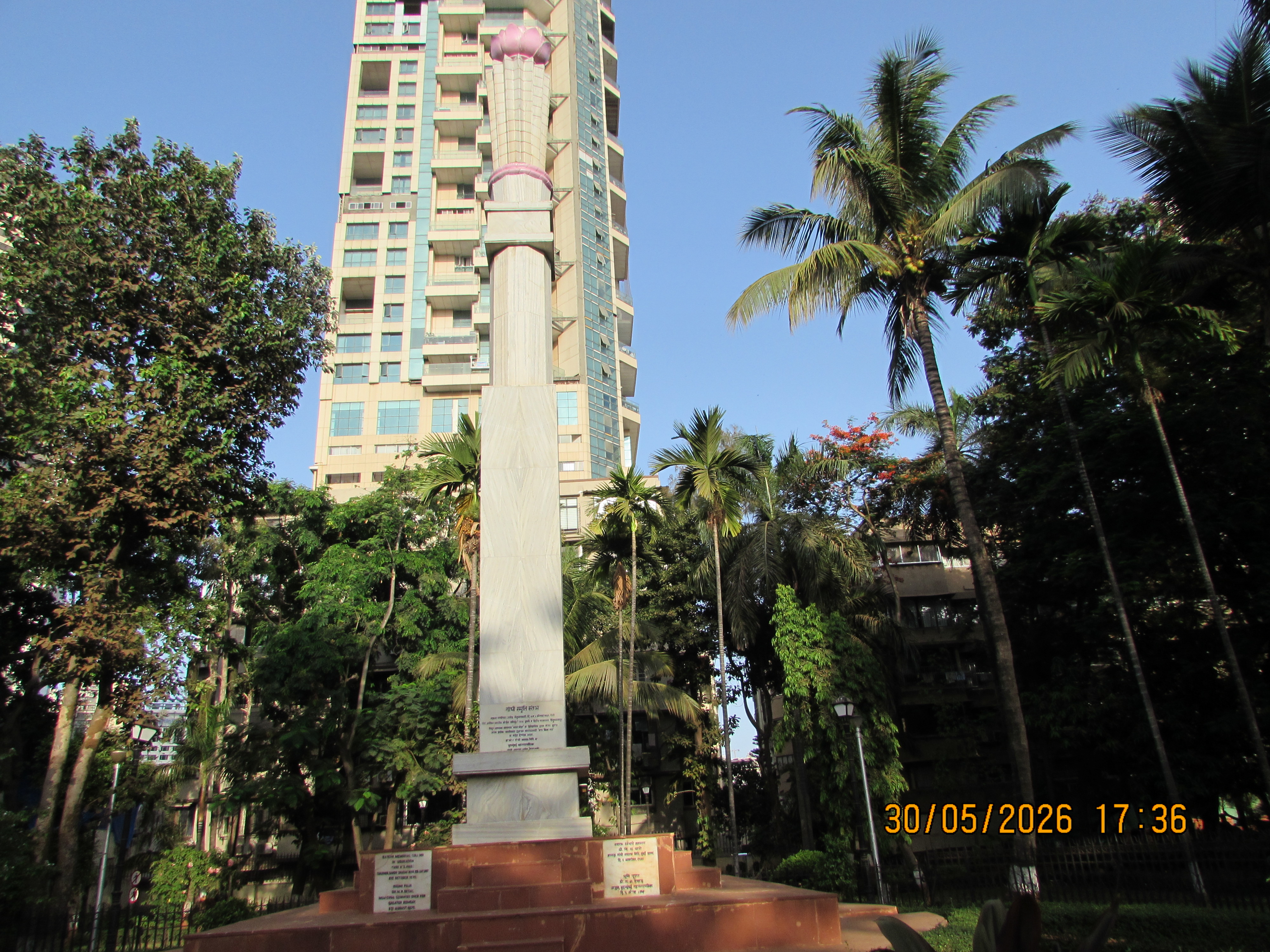
Gandhi Memorial Column, inaugurated on 2nd October 1970

A central road cuts through the maidan grounds and connects the August Kranti Road with Hughes Road. The ground connects Tejpal Road and Laburnum Road, Alexandra Road and August Kranti Road.

The closest suburban railway station on the Western Railway line is Grant Road. The August Kranti Rajdhani Express, connecting Mumbai to New Delhi, was named after this maidan

In January 2026, August Kranti Maidan served as the venue for the Vasudhaiva Kutumbakam Ki Oar 4.0 conclave (16–22 January), organised by the Jyot India Foundation in association with the Ministry of External Affairs, which brought together jurists, diplomats, and policymakers to deliberate on India's constitutional transition under the theme Sankraman Kaal.
