= Neru =

Neru may refer to:

== People ==
- Neru (footballer), Spanish football player
- Neru Leavasa, New Zealand politician
- Neru Nagahama, Japanese celebrity
- Neru Tsukumo, Japanese idol of the group Cynhn

== Other ==
- Neru (film), 2023 Indian Malayalam-language courtroom drama film
- Neru: Way of the Martial Artist, Japanese manga series by Minya Hiraga

== See also ==
- Nehru (disambiguation)
