= Speeches about Indian independence =

Speeches on movement to end British rule

Speeches about the Indian independence movement include Mahatma Gandhi's Quit India speech (1942) on non-violence and mass action, Jawaharlal Nehru's "Tryst with Destiny" (1947) marking independence with a pledge to a new era, and Muhammad Ali Jinnah's vision for Pakistan's inclusive future. They reflect the struggle to end British rule and gain nationhood through ideologies like Ahimsa.

== Clean Break speech ==
Although the militant factions of the Independence movement were advocating a complete break from British rule for almost a century, the first call for a non-violent movement led by Mahatma Gandhi was articulated in the aftermath of the failed Cripps' mission in April, 1942. Below is an excerpt of Gandhi's speech advocating complete independence from British rule.

"I am convinced that the time has come for the British and the Indians to be reconciled to complete separation from each other. Complete and immediate orderly withdrawal of the British from India [...] will at once put the Allied cause on a completely moral basis. [...] I ask every Briton to support me in my appeal to the British at this hour to retire from every Asiatic and African possession. ... I ask for a bloodless end of an unnatural domination and for a new era. Leave India to God and if that be too much, leave her to anarchy, necessity for withdrawal lies in its being immediate."

== Quit India Resolution ==
On 8 August 1942, the All India Congress Committee met in Bombay and passed the Quit India Resolution. The outcome was a mass uprising all over India with mass boycotts and civil disobedience, called the Quit India Movement

== Declaring the close of the Colonial era ==
On 15 August 1947, Jawaharlal Nehru, the first Prime Minister of free India, addressed the Constituent Assembly. In his famous speech, Tryst with Destiny, he declared the end of the colonial era and called on citizens to recognize the promise and opportunity of the moment:

"Long years ago, we made a tryst with destiny. Now the time has come when we shall redeem our pledge - not wholly or in full measure - but very substantially. At the stroke of the midnight hour, when the world sleeps, India will awake to life and freedom. A moment comes, but rarely in history, when we step out from the old to the new, when an age ends, and when the soul of a nation, long suppressed, finds utterance."

His speech went on to pay homage to Mahatma Gandhi's efforts in the Independence Movement and called upon his countrymen to work together to

"...bring freedom and opportunity to the common man, to the peasants and workers of India; to fight and end poverty and ignorance and disease; to build up a prosperous, democratic and progressive nation, and to create social, economic and political institutions which will ensure justice and fullness of life to every man and woman."

The declaration ends with an exhortation to work together in the common weal and cautions against narrow sectarian or religious divisiveness:

"All of us, to whatever religion we may belong, are equally the children of India with equal rights, privileges and obligations. We cannot encourage communalism or narrow-mindedness, for no nation can be great whose people are narrow in thought or in action."

== See also ==
- Constitution of India
- Fundamental Rights, Directive Principles and Fundamental Duties of India
