= Nehru (film) =

- Directed by: Shyam Benegal; Yuri Aldokhin
- Written by: Shyam Benegal; Vladimir Zimianin; Yuri Aldokhin; Aleksander Gorev
- Screenplay by: Shyam Benegal; Jag Mohan; Shama Zaidi
- Produced by: Yash Chaudhary; Lyudmila Kudriavtseva
- Starring: Jawaharlal Nehru; Mahatma Gandhi; Indira Gandhi
- Narrated by: Saeed Jaffrey
- Cinematography: Subrata Mitra; Konstantin Orozaliev
- Edited by: Somnath Kulkarni; Valeria Konovalova
- Music by: Vanraj Bhatia; Alexei Kozlov
- Production companies: Films Division of India; Center-Nauch-Film Studios, Moscow; Sovin Films, Moscow
- Release dates: 1984 (India); 8 November 2007 (Lyon Asiexpo Film Festival, France)
- Running time: 164 min
- Language: English

Nehru is a 1984 Indian English-language documentary film based on the life of Jawaharlal Nehru, the first Prime Minister of independent Republic of India. The film is directed by Shyam Benegal and Yuri Aldokhin, and produced by Films Division of India in collaboration with Center-Nauch-Film Studios, and Sovin Films, Russia with Yash Chaudhary as the executive producer. The film won the inaugural Best Historical Reconstruction and Compilation Film at the 32nd National Film Awards.

== Awards ==
National Film Awards

- Best Historical Reconstruction and Compilation Film (1985).

== See also ==
- Tryst with Destiny (1947 speech)
- The light has gone out of our lives (1948 speech)
- Our Prime Minister (1957 film)
