= Jawaharlal Nehru Medical College =

Jawaharlal Nehru Medical College may refer to:

- Jawaharlal Nehru Medical College, Ajmer, Rajasthan, India
- Jawaharlal Nehru Medical College, Aligarh, Uttar Pradesh, India
- Jawaharlal Nehru Medical College, Belgaum, Karnataka, India
- Jawaharlal Nehru Medical College, Wardha, Maharashtra, India

== See also ==
- Nehru (disambiguation)
