= Nehru ministry =

Nehru ministry may refer to:

- First Nehru ministry, the Indian government headed by Jawaharlal Nehru from 1947 to 1952
- Second Nehru ministry, the Indian government headed by Jawaharlal Nehru from 1952 to 1957
- Third Nehru ministry, the Indian government headed by Jawaharlal Nehru from 1957 to 1962
- Fourth Nehru ministry, the Indian government headed by Jawaharlal Nehru from 1962 to 1964

== See also ==
- Nehru (disambiguation)
- Jawaharlal Nehru, the first prime minister of India
