= Jawaharlal Nehru University (disambiguation) =

Jawaharlal Nehru University may refer to:

- Jawaharlal Nehru University, a central university in New Delhi, India
- Jawaharlal Nehru Technological University (disambiguation)
  - Jawaharlal Nehru Technological University, Anantapur, a technical university in Anantapur, Andhra Pradesh, India
  - Jawaharlal Nehru Technological University, Hyderabad, a technical university in Hyderabad, Telangana, India
  - Jawaharlal Nehru Technological University, Kakinada, a technical university in Kakinada, Andhra Pradesh, India
- Jawaharlal Nehru Architecture and Fine Arts University, an arts university in Hyderabad, Telangana, India

== See also ==
- Nehru (disambiguation)
