= Jawaharlal Nehru Technological University =

Jawaharlal Nehru Technological University may refer to these universities in India named after its first prime minister Jawaharlal Nehru:

- Jawaharlal Nehru Technological University, Anantapur
- Jawaharlal Nehru Technological University - Gurajada, Vizianagaram
- Jawaharlal Nehru Technological University, Hyderabad
- Jawaharlal Nehru Technological University, Kakinada

== See also ==
- Jawaharlal Nehru University (disambiguation)
- Nehru (disambiguation)
