= Nehru Park, Guwahati =

Urban park in Guwahati, India

Nehru Park
- Interactive map of Nehru Park
- Type: Public park
- Location: Pan Bazaar in Guwahati, Assam, India
- Coordinates: 26°11′19″N 91°44′50″E
- Area: 24,120 square metres (259,600 sq ft)
- Created: 10 May 2023
- Operator: GMDA
- Open: Friday to Wednesday, 10:00 AM to 8:00 PM
- Status: Open

Nehru Park (Assamese pronunciation: [nɛɦɹu uˈdjan]) is an urban park situated in the Pan Bazaar area of Guwahati, India.

== History ==
In 1995, the Government of Assam acquired land from Christ Church, Guwahati for the development of a public park, later named Nehru Park after former Prime Minister of India, Jawaharlal Nehru. The park was inaugurated by then-Chief Minister of Assam, Tarun Gogoi on 12 June 2004.

The park featured a lush lawn, a playground for children, a jogging track, an amphitheatre, a rock garden, a simulator ride, and a few man-made ponds. It also featured forty-five different concrete sculptures depicting various dance forms of Assam, including Bihu, Ojapali and Jhumair. ATV rides inside the park compound were later introduced.

In 2020, an amount of ₹11.684 crore (US$1.2 million) was sanctioned by the Government of Assam for a revamp of the park, with the project undertaken by Guwahati Metropolitan Development Authority. Originally scheduled to be re-inaugurated in March 2023, the date was postponed to May 2023 over several delays. The park was finally inaugurated by Chief Minister Himanta Biswa Sarma on 10 May 2023, but remained closed to the public for some more time due to non-completion of the construction.

The remodelled park features a new sculpture of former Chief Minister of Assam, Gopinath Bordoloi, and a prominent Ashoka Stambha surrounded by an artificial pond. A new entrance has been added towards Mahatma Gandhi Road to the north.

On 12 July 2023, GMDA announced that a toy train would be introduced in the children's area, and a rain shelter would be constructed in the park. The projects are set to be completed within six months.

== Features ==
The park boasts the following features:

- Horticulture garden
- Cafeteria and multi-utility building
- Walking zone
- Water fountain
- Children's playground
- Storm water drain
- Toilet block
- Showroom for indigenous cultural artefacts
