= Nehru Park, Paravur =

Public park in Kollam, India

Nehru Park
- Paravur Municipal Park; G.Devarajan Memorial Park
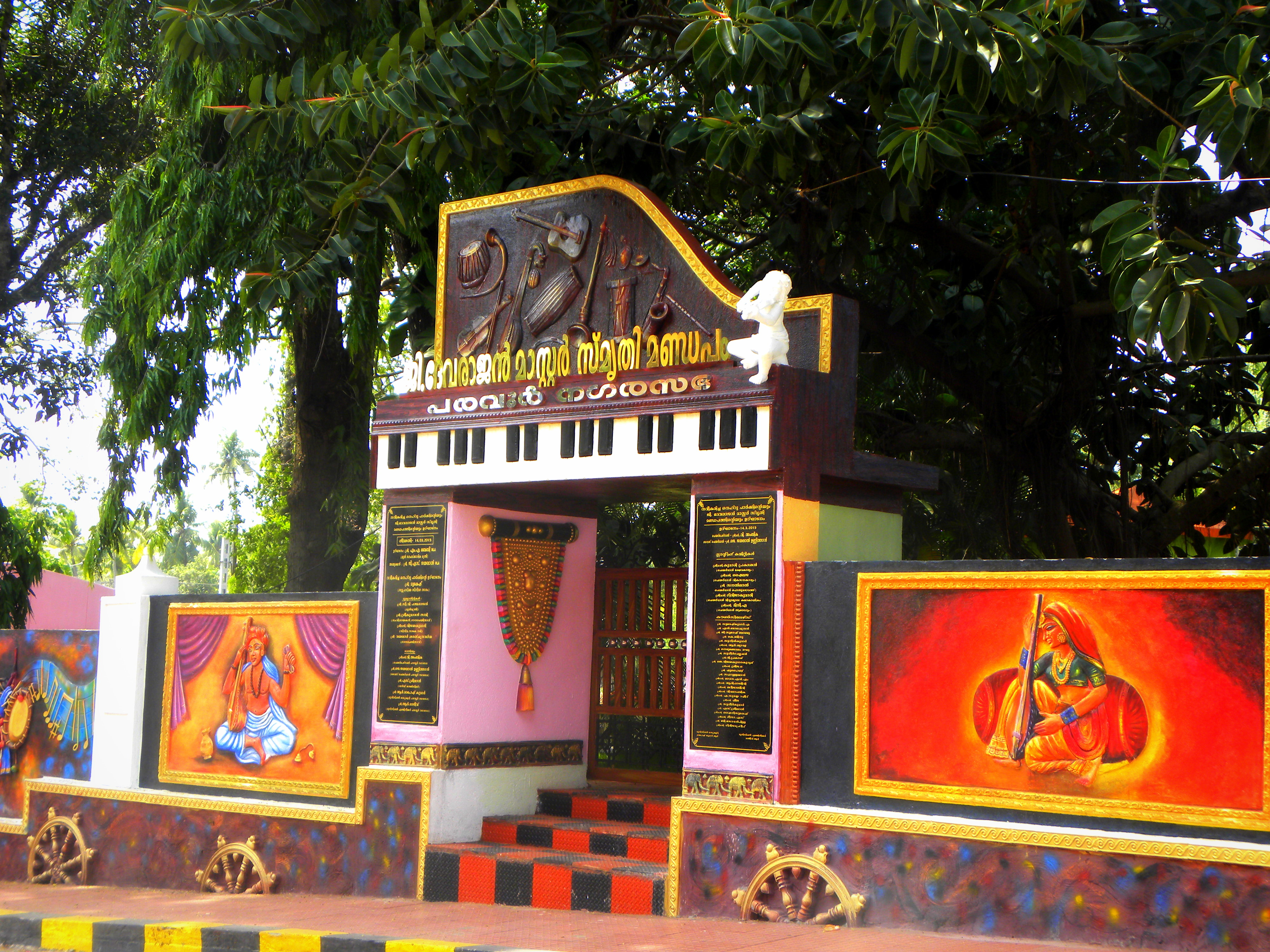
- Entrance of Nehru Park, Paravur
- Interactive map of Nehru Park
- Type: Public park
- Location: Opposite Municipal office, Paravur, Kollam, India
- Coordinates: 8.814191°N 76.670997°E
- Operator: Paravur Municipality
- Status: Open all year

Nehru Park or Children's Park, Paravur (also known as Paravur Municipal Park) is a public park situated at Paravur in Kollam Metropolitan Area, India. It is situated very close to Paravur railway station. Nehru Park is one of the main centres of recreational activities in Paravur town. Devarajan Master, most popular musician of Malayalam film industry(born in Paravur), was cremated at this park. A bronze statue of Devarajan Master sculpted by Kanayi Kunhiraman is there in the park. The compositions of Devarajan Master will be played in the park on every evening.

== Facilities ==
- Open air stage
- Television
- Fun rides for children
- Garden
- Audio broadcasting of Devarajan Master's compositions

== Renovation ==
In 2014, Paravur Municipality renovated the park at a cost of Rs. 17 lakhs(US$26654.64) by facilitating sculptured compound wall, open air stage, new fun rides and an audio broadcasting facility for playing the compositions of Devarajan Master.

== See also ==
- Paravur
- Paravur railway station
- Paravur Thekkumbhagam
- Pozhikara
- Estuaries of Paravur
- Paravur Puttingal Temple
- Nedungolam
