= Clean Break (novel) =

2005 novel by Jacqueline Wilson

- First edition
- Author: Jacqueline Wilson
- Illustrator: Nick Sharratt
- Language: English
- Genre: Children's novel
- Publisher: Doubleday
- Publication date: 21 March 2005
- Publication place: United Kingdom
- Media type: Print (hardback and paperback)
- Pages: 169pp
- Preceded by: The Diamond Girls
- Followed by: Love Lessons

Clean Break is a children's novel by Jacqueline Wilson, first published in the United Kingdom in 2005. It deals with the consequences of a father abandoning his family.

== Plot summary ==
The main character is a young girl named Emily, who lives with her mother Julie, her half sister Vita, and her half brother Maxie in their grandmother Ellen's house. Although her dad, Frankie, is technically her stepfather, he treats her the exact same as her siblings, his biological children. Em is highly sensitive and is very insecure about her weight. On Christmas Day, Em, Vita and Maxie receive their presents. Vita receives a reindeer hand-puppet called Dancer (owing to the reindeer wearing a tutu and ballet shoes), Maxie gets a set of Caran D'Ache felt tip pens and Em gets an 'emerald' ring.

Later that day Em overhears Frankie talking on his mobile, and realises that he is having a secret affair. Em confronts her father, and he owns up to his cheating, and by the next morning he has left.

After Em's step-dad walks out, the rest of the family struggle to get along without him. Em, Vita and Maxie are all convinced that Dad will come back. Dad later calls Mum to tell her that he will be taking the kids out on New Year's Day.

On New Year's Day, the children go and visit their father, Frankie, at the home of his new partner Sarah, but she is rude, selfish and obnoxious. On a visit they take to a park, Em, Vita and Maxie are astounded to find their Dad passionately kissing Sarah, in a way that he would never do to their mum. Sarah is an aspiring actress and both she and Frankie move to Scotland quite soon into their relationship. When they arrive home, they all reject their Dad's goodbyes.

The children all tell their mother that Sarah and their Dad don't get on very well, and will be home soon. Their grandmother does not understand how much the family all love him and would take him back if he ever returned. Emily runs into her biological dad at a fair, and was scared because he had always abused her mother when she was young. Em's Gran decides to take them on a holiday and gets a boyfriend herself. Em also finds that she is good at swimming while on holiday and later takes up swimming classes when she gets home, becoming more confident and losing some weight in the process.

When Em travels to London to meet her favourite author, the family runs into Frankie again, as he has apparently broken up with Sarah and found a new girlfriend, Hannah, before moving back to London. Emily runs after Frankie, falls and breaks her arm and Dancer (Vita's reindeer puppet), but her dad stops and takes her to the hospital.

The story ends on Christmas Eve just under one year after Frankie left, with Frankie sending Dancer back to them as a Christmas present. Somebody taps on the door pretending to be Father Christmas. The book finishes with the line "It looked like it was going to be the best Christmas ever", implying that her stepfather has returned.

== Reception ==
Clean Break was a best-selling book.

The Observer wrote "Jacqueline Wilson's particular talent is to find a bittersweetness in the dysfunctional families she describes. In Clean Break, she commutes between love and desertion, fun and responsibility. She is especially good at writing about the gallantry of children, their determination to go on being children and having fun. But, at the same time, her children ... are often compelled to be more mature than their guardians." and Booktrust commented "Jacqueline Wilson proves once again why, as one of the most highly-gifted and most resonant voices in contemporary children's literature, she is also deservedly one of the best-loved."
