= G. Kumara Pillai =

Indian poet and activist (1923–2000)

G. Kumara Pillai (22 August 1923 – 16 August 2000) was a Malayalam–language poet, essayist and activist from Kerala state, South India. He was a Gandhian all through his adult life and was in the forefront of several human rights movements in Kerala. He authored some 20 books. His poetry work Saptaswaram received the Odakkuzhal Award in 1984 and Kerala Sahitya Akademi Award in 1985.

== Biography ==
He was born on 22 August 1923 in Vennimala in Kottayam district of present-day Kerala as the son of Peringara P. Gopala Pillayi and Parvathy Amma. He completed his education from S. B. College, Changanassery and worked as a clerk in Bombay and later in Kerala Secretariat. He holds a master's degree in literature from Nagpur University. He was Professor of English in University College, Thiruvananthapuram for about 40 years. He was married to Leela, former professor at St. Joseph's College for Women, Alappuzha.

He was a freedom fighter and also was a member of Kochi Prajamandalam during the period 1944-46. He was a Gandhian all through his adult life and was in the forefront of agitations against human rights violations in Kerala. He also led agitations against the liquor policy of the State. He was one of the founding members of People's Union for Civil Liberties (PUCL). He was the President of its Kerala Unit in its formative days and a member of its National Council from 1980 to 1996. He was also associated with the India chapter of Amnesty International.

He authored some 20 books. He received the Kerala Sahitya Akademi Award in the year 1985 for his poetry work Saptaswaram. He penned the lyrics for the song "Hrudayathin Romanjam" from the famous G. Aravindan film Uttarayanam.

He died on 16 August 2000 in Thrissur.

== Works ==
- Arali Pookkal (1951) -His first published poetry collection
- Marubhumiyude Kinavukal
- Ormayude Sugandham
- Saptaswaram
- snehathinde varthamanam
- jeevannulla paattu

== Awards ==
- 1984: Odakkuzhal Award for Saptaswaram
- 1985: Kerala Sahitya Akademi Award for Saptaswaram
- Ashan Puraskaram
