= The light has gone out of our lives =

1948 speech by Pt. Jawaharlal Nehru

The light has gone out of our lives is a speech that was delivered ex tempore by Jawaharlal Nehru, the first Prime Minister of India, on 30 January 1948, following the assassination of Mahatma Gandhi earlier that evening. It is often cited as one of the greatest speeches in history.

== Assassination of Mahatma Gandhi ==
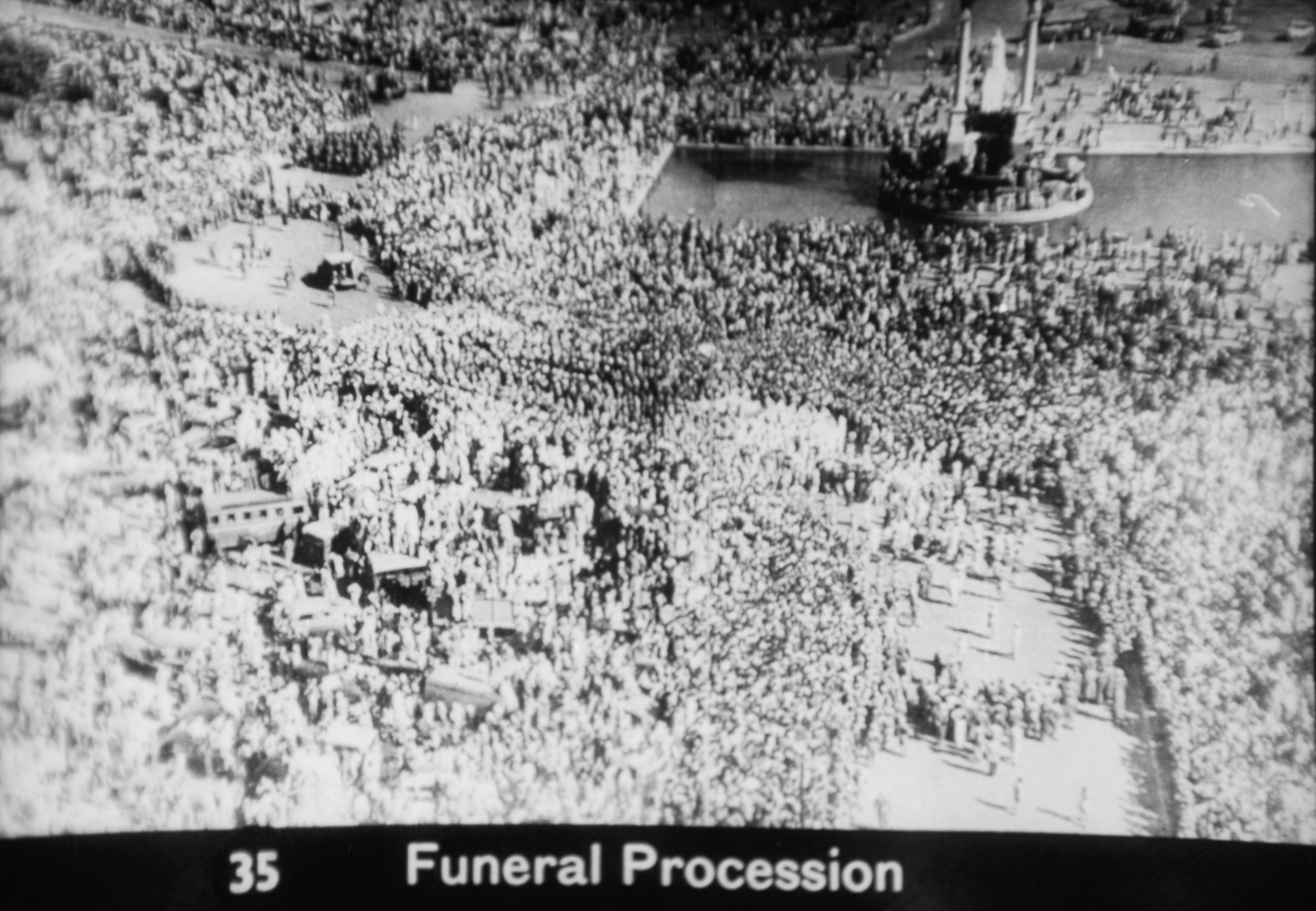
Aerial image of the Funeral procession of Gandhi, passing the India Gate, Delhi

Mahatma Gandhi was assassinated by Nathuram Vinayak Godse, at Birla House, Delhi on 30 January 1948 while Gandhi was heading for a prayer meeting. At 6.00 PM that evening, the Government announced over All India Radio, in a carefully worded statement that "Mahatma Gandhi was assassinated in New Delhi at twenty minutes past five this afternoon." Messages of condolence for his death came in from across the world. As world leaders paid homage to Gandhi, Bernard Shaw acerbically noted that "It shows how dangerous it is to be good." To show its respect, the United Nations lowered its flag to half-mast. In India, the news of the assassination plunged the country into deep shock. At the mourning chamber in Birla House, the Governor General, Lord Mountbatten brought Nehru and Patel closer telling them what Gandhi told him earlier that day, "They listen to you more than they do to me. Do your best to bring them together." Mountbatten informed them that "That was his dying wish". Visibly moved, Patel and Nehru embraced. Mountbatten then asked Nehru to address the nation as the people were now looking upon him to lead them. Nehru replied: "I can't. I am too upset. I am not prepared. I don't know what to say". Mountbatten told him not to worry since God would tell him what to say.

== Speech ==
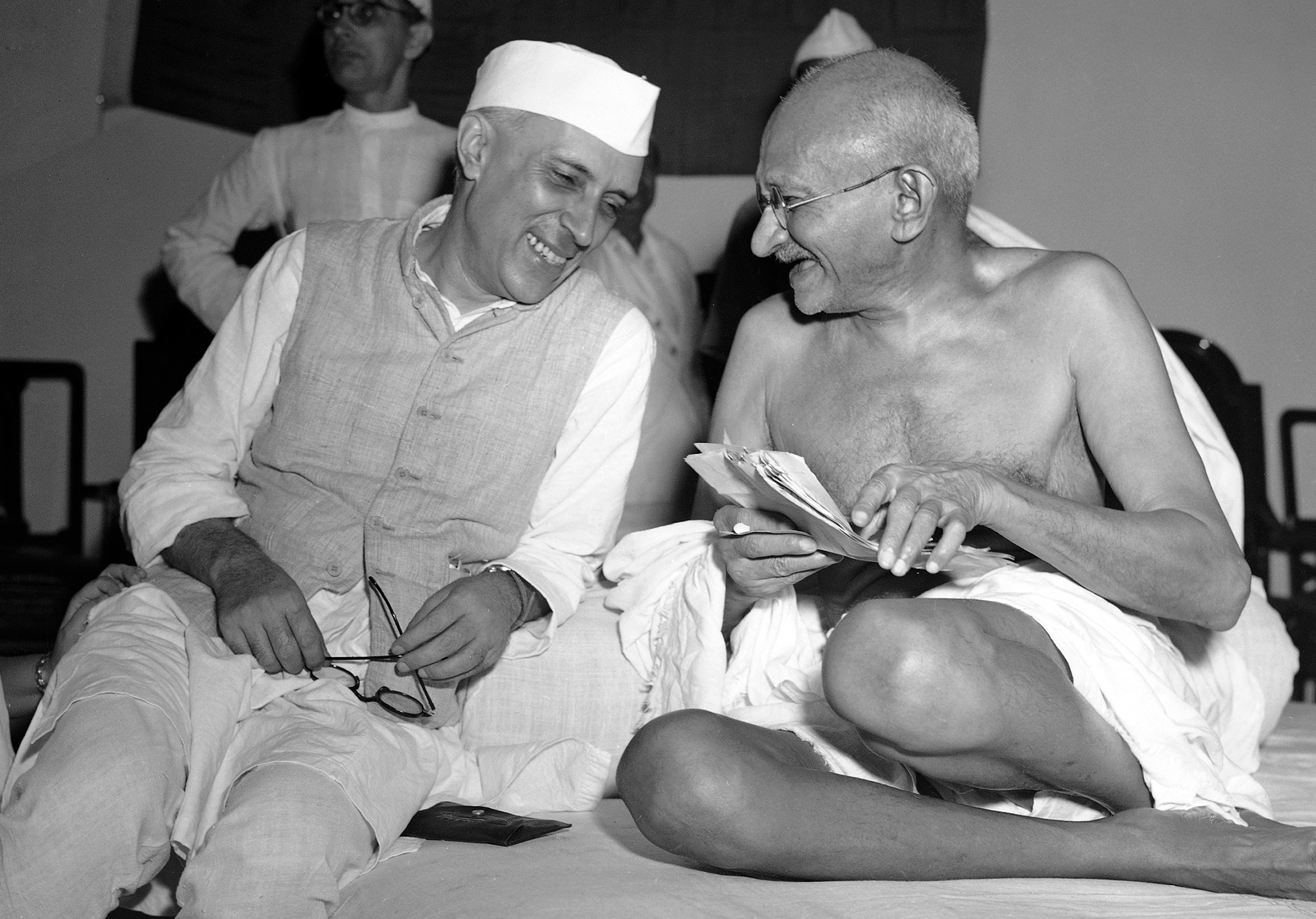

Nehru addressed the nation later that evening on All India Radio. His speech was delivered in English spontaneously and without preparation. The speech began by Nehru telling his "friends and comrades that the light has gone out of our lives". He identifies himself with the Indian masses in their sorrow by expressing his own helplessness and stated, "I do not know what to tell you or how to say it". Nehru then went on to warn the masses of the dangers of communalism and asked them to take a solemn pledge to work for unity, fraternity and peace as the best tribute they can pay to Gandhi's memory.

In the speech, Nehru compared Gandhi to an eternal beacon and predicted that a thousand years later,

That light will be seen... the world will see it and it will give solace to innumerable hearts. For that light represented something more than the immediate present; it represented the living, the eternal truths, reminding us of the right path, drawing us from error, taking this ancient country to freedom.

Nehru then turned to the more mundane matter of giving the details of the funeral arrangements.

The speech was noted for its grace and poise, conveyed through Nehru's choice of phrases and images. He warned his listeners about the "poison of communalism" and referred to the assassin as a 'madman'. The speech was noted as a great example of oration because of its content and language, as seen in the wholeness of its sentences and themes, the almost poetic choice of words, and the narration's use of variation and ordering of themes and repetition of key images. The sense of calmness with which Nehru talks about the funeral arrangements, his warning to the people and his call for peace and combating communalism at a time of such deep loss conveyed a sense of solemnity and dignity of his office.

== John Paul II ==
During Pope John Paul II's first visit to India in 1986, he addressed the nation at Raj Ghat, the samadhi of Gandhi, where he referred to Nehru's eulogy. Nehru's words "The light that shone in this country was no ordinary light" were said by the Pope to have "expressed the conviction of the whole world". In further concurrence with Nehru's words

The light has gone out, I said, and yet I was wrong. For the light that shone in this country was no ordinary light. The light that has illumined this country for these many years will illumine this country for many more years...

The Pope went on to note that Gandhi

who lived by non-violence appeared to be defeated by violence. For a brief moment the light seemed to have gone out. Yet his teachings and the example of his life live on in the minds and hearts of millions of men and women. Yes, the light is still shining, and the heritage of Mahatma Gandhi speaks to us still. And today as a pilgrim of peace I have come here to pay homage to Mahatma Gandhi, hero of humanity.

== Cartier-Bresson's photography ==
Henri Cartier-Bresson, who had been to India shortly after and was one of the last people to meet and photograph Gandhi, famously captured an image of Nehru on the gate of Birla House to announce Gandhi's death. The photographs covering Gandhi's final hours before his assassination, the arrangements for his funeral and the masses attending the funeral have been described as "not the portrait of any man, but the portrait of a nation in the deepest moment of its sorrow" and have been shown all over the world.

== In popular culture ==
Nehru's speech figures in Amitava Kumar's novel Nobody Does the Right Thing.

== See also ==
- Tryst with Destiny
- Melville de Mellow
