= Tryst with Destiny =

1947 English speech by Jawaharlal Nehru

External videos
- Tryst with Destiny, Pandit Jawaharlal Nehru's Independence Day Speech (1947) video by Indian National Congress

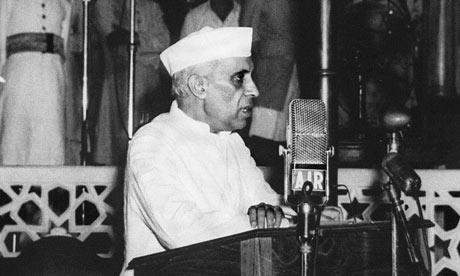
Jawaharlal Nehru delivers his "Tryst with Destiny" speech on 14 August 1947

"Tryst with Destiny" was an English-language speech by Jawaharlal Nehru, the first Prime Minister of India, to the Indian Constituent Assembly in the Parliament House, on the eve of India's Independence, towards midnight on 14 August 1947. The speech spoke on the aspects that transcended Indian history. It is considered to be one of the greatest speeches of the 20th century and to be a landmark oration that captures the essence of the triumphant culmination of the Indian independence movement against British colonial rule in India. He declared the end of the colonial era and called on citizens to recognize the promise and opportunity of the moment:

Long years ago, we made a tryst with destiny, and now the time comes when we shall redeem our pledge, not wholly or in full measure, but very substantially. At the stroke of the midnight hour, when the world sleeps, India will awake to life and freedom. A moment comes, which comes but rarely in history, when we step out from the old to the new, when an age ends, and when the soul of a nation, long suppressed, finds utterance.

His speech went on to pay homage to Mahatma Gandhi's efforts in the Independence Movement and called upon his countrymen to work together to

bring freedom and opportunity to the common man, to the peasants and workers of India; to fight and end poverty and ignorance and disease; to build up a prosperous, democratic and progressive nation, and to create social, economic and political institutions which will ensure justice and fullness of life to every man and woman.

The declaration ends with an exhortation to work together in the common weal and cautions against narrow sectarian or religious divisiveness:

All of us, to whatever religion we may belong, are equally the children of India with equal rights, privileges and obligations. We cannot encourage communalism or narrow-mindedness, for no nation can be great whose people are narrow in thought or in action.

== Popular culture ==
- The final episode of the 1984 series The Jewel in the Crown contains extracts of the speech.
- The speech is referenced in the 1998 Hindi film Earth directed by Deepa Mehta. The film portrays the main characters listening to the speech over the radio, against the backdrop of the Hindu-Muslim riots following the Partition of India. This provides an interesting juxtaposition between the realities of Partition and the optimism that followed Independence.
- In the 2000 film Hey Ram directed by Kamal Haasan, parts of the speech are heard in the background providing the audience a timeline of the happenings in the movie.
- Hazaaron Khwaishein Aisi, a 2003 Hindi film by Sudhir Mishra that portrayed the political and social turbulence of the late 1960s and the '70s in India contains a clip of the speech and the narrative voice speaks of the souring of Nehru's dream within two decades of Independence.
- 2012 Hindi film Gangs of Wasseypur used clips from this speech in one of the shots featuring the character Shahid Khan.
- The Salman Khan film Bharat also used clips from the speech in their trailer.
- The film Student of the Year mentioned the name of the speech as a clue in the treasure hunt game.
- The book Midnight's Children by Salman Rushdie has a reference to this speech as does the novel Train to Pakistan by Khushwant Singh.
- The speech is sampled by trance artist John 00 Fleming in the album One Hundred Ten WKO during the fifth track, "The Stroke of the Midnight Hour".
- The musical group Kobo Town uses sound clips from this speech in their song "Sing Out, Shout Out" from their album Independence.
- In the aftermath of the 2008 Mumbai Attacks, the indie rock band, Parikrama, released a single "One" in tribute, which sampled part of the speech.
- The "Let's Crack It" song owned by Unacademy made its intro using the actual speech voice clips.
- Zohran Mamdani quoted lines from the speech after winning the 2025 New York City mayoral election.

== See also ==
- Speeches about Indian independence
- The light has gone out of our lives, speech on the death of Mahatma Gandhi by Nehru
